= Red Hill Band =

Concert band in Red Hill, Pennsylvania

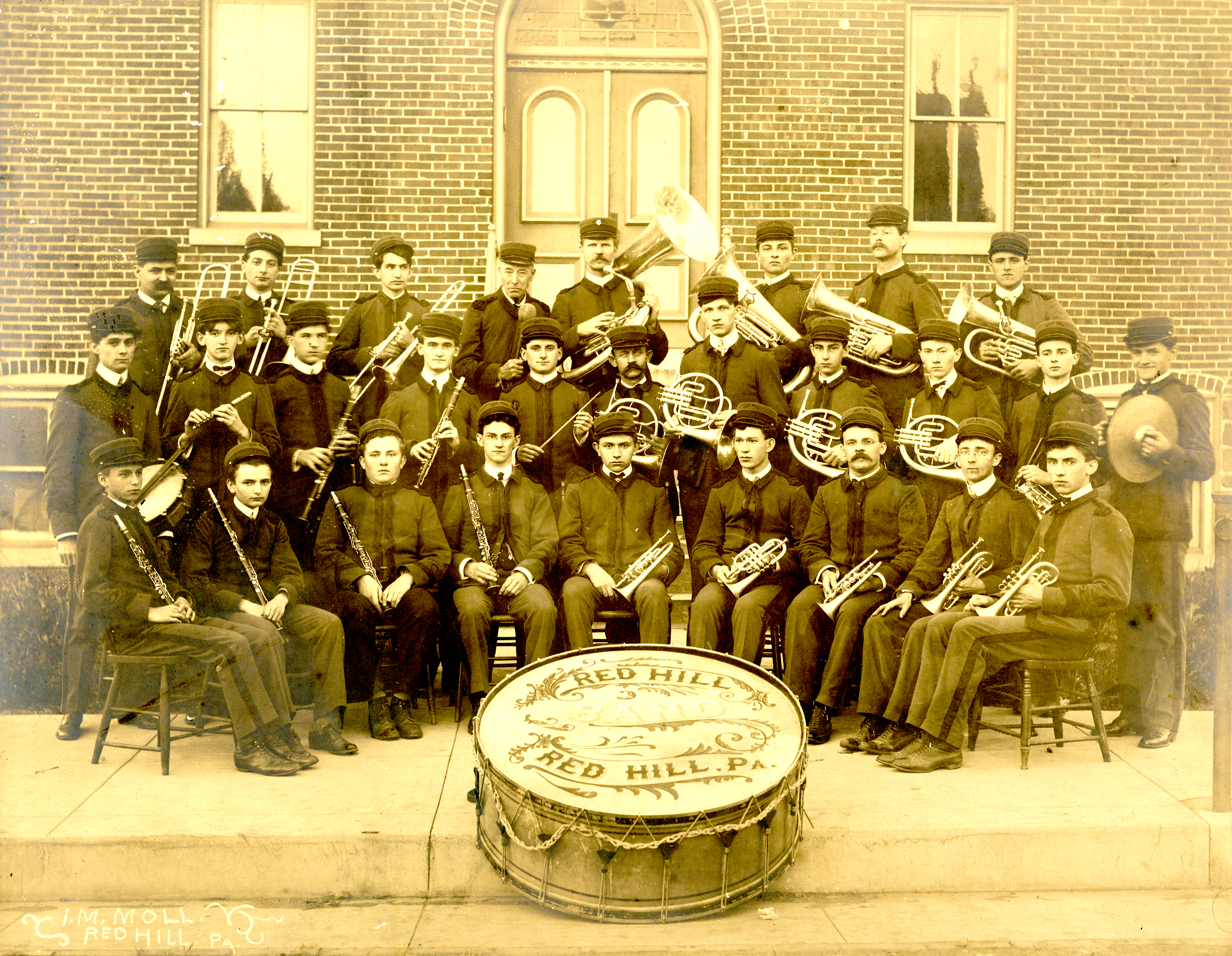
- The Red Hill Band taken in front of the Lucian B. Miller cigar factory. Photo courtesy of the Schwenkfelder Library & Heritage Center.

Background information
- Genres: Concert Music
- Years active: 1900–present
- Website: redhillband.com

The Red Hill Band is a concert band located in Red Hill, Pennsylvania, United States, composed of community members from the surrounding area. The band was established on December 6, 1900, and has been active for more than 100 years. The band was heavily influenced by John Philip Sousa and the popular marches of the 20th century. It won first place against 26 other bands at the 1931 fireman's Labor Day parade in Washington DC, and in 1965 was commended by the United States Senate.

== History ==
The band was formed on December 6, 1900, at the Red Hill Hotel, before the borough of Red Hill was established. The band consisted of 22 members at its formation, and had 30 members by 1903. Eugene Styer was the first director, followed shortly by Romanus Miller and then Frederick Eddinger. According to local historian Samuel Laudenslager, the Golden Age of Bands occurred between the end of the American Civil War and John Philip Sousa's death in 1932. Sousa visited Norristown during one of his tours in 1904, which influenced the musical selections of local bands as well as the chosen band uniforms. Before the United States joined World War II, the Montgomery County commissioners obtained a large area of land near Green Lane and developed it into a county park where local bands would play. Concert bands in the area were each assigned a number of days that they could perform a concert in the park. The Red Hill Band was given three days a year—likely due to proximity—while the Norristown Band, The Pottstown Band, and Verdi were only given one day each season.

The band's first concert was in February 1901 at an indoor fair in Sumneytown where they made $10 for their performance.

The band first began practicing in the Lucian B. Miller cigar factory on Main Street, located across from where the Red Hill Post Office was at the time. Cigar manufacturing was common in the Perkiomen Valley during this period, and most of the towns had their own concert band, which led to many musicians working as cigar makers. The cigar factory was later purchased by the Rosenau Brothers and converted into a dress factory. Band practices were held for short periods of time at a carriage shop owned by William Welker, Genszler's barn, the local public school, and the second floor of the Kummerer store. The band then began rehearsing in the Red Hill Fire Hall and continued practicing there until 1924. In 1924, the band had their own rehearsal hall built on the corner of Eighth and Main Street and continued to practice there until 1929. However, in 1929 the band decided to sell the rehearsal hall to Murray H. Gulack. Gulack converted the hall into a clothing factory and the rear of the building later burned down on February 4, 1931. In more recent years, the band has practiced every Thursday night at the New Goschenhoppen Park in East Greenville. The park has a wooden band shell painted white with blue and red trim.

The Red Hill Band plays a variety of brass band music including marches, Broadway tunes, and novelty numbers.

The band received funding from the American Federation of Musicians and received grants from the Recording Industries Music Performance Trust Funds.

When the band started out in 1900 they transported their instruments using horse-drawn wagons; however, by the 1990s the band owned a truck with the band's logo painted on the side.

In 1960, three of the founding members were present for the annual spring concert: Adam McLean, Llewellyn Brey, and Sylvester Fox. The band was the only citizens' band in Upper Perkiomen Valley in 1980. The band played their 86th annual spring concert at the Upper Perkiomen High School in Pennsburg featuring guest soloist Jane Dywab, who played Rhapsody in Blue and "Maple Leaf Rag". The band has been active for more than 100 years and performed their 100th anniversary celebration in 2000 with Vincent P. Bercher as the director. In 2015, the band had 55 members ranging in age from 15 to 85. In 2017, Walt Groller was the guest performer at the band's annual spring concert, where they played the polkas and Austrian-German folk music that Groller is known for.

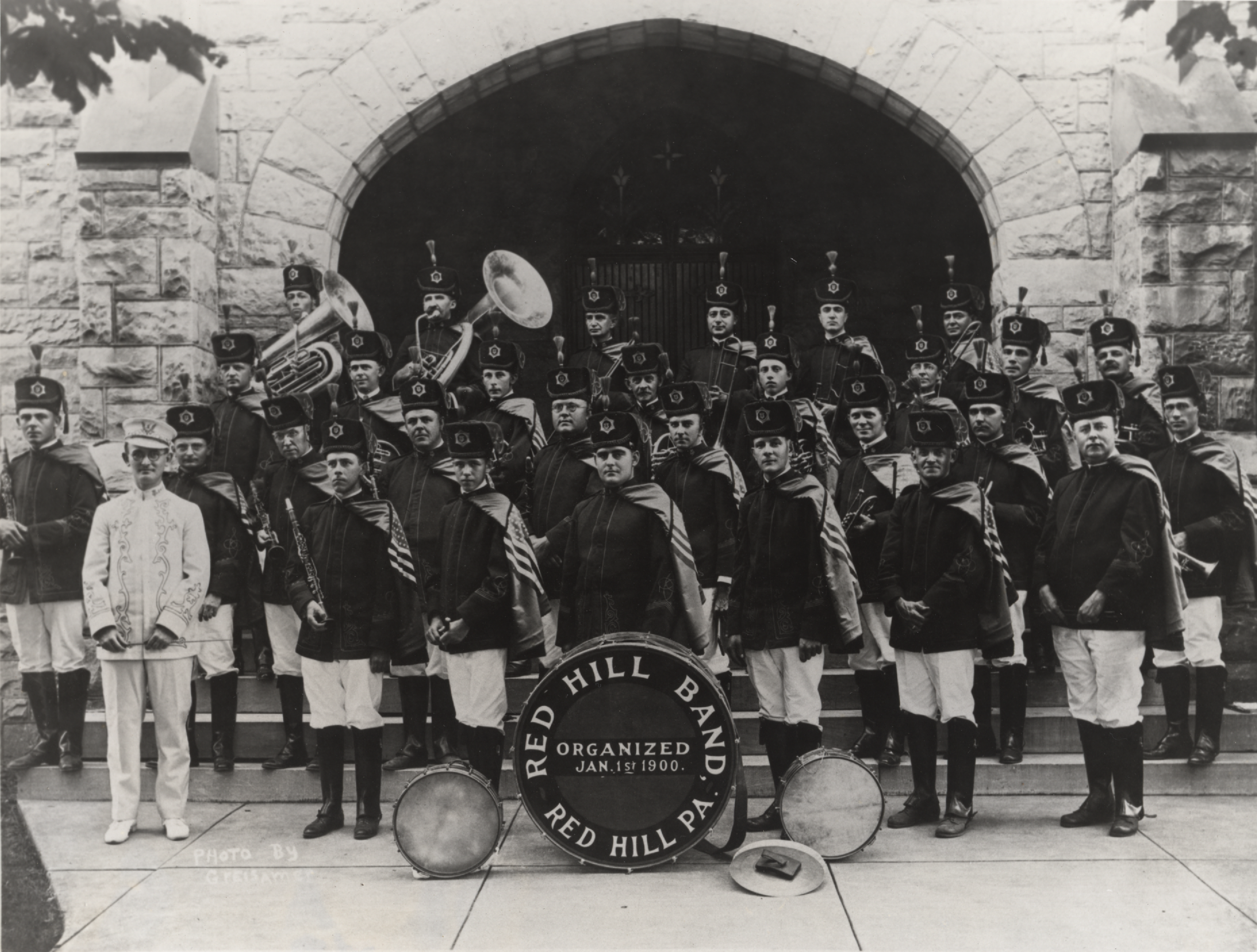
The Red Hill Band in the 1920s with Howard B. Pflieger as the director. The band is standing in front of the St. Mark's Lutheran Church of Pennsburg, PA.

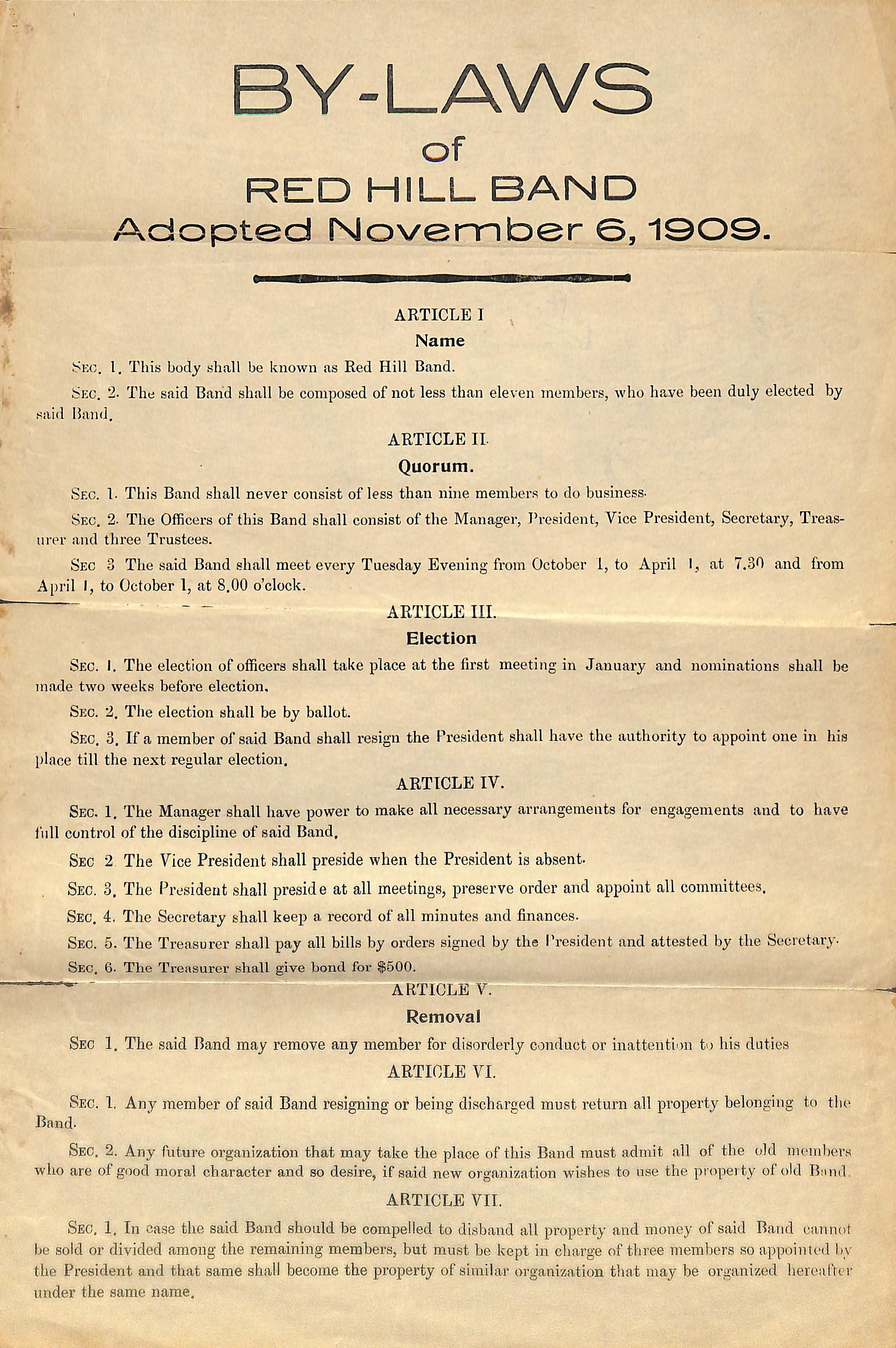
The by-laws adopted by the Red Hill Band on November 6, 1909.

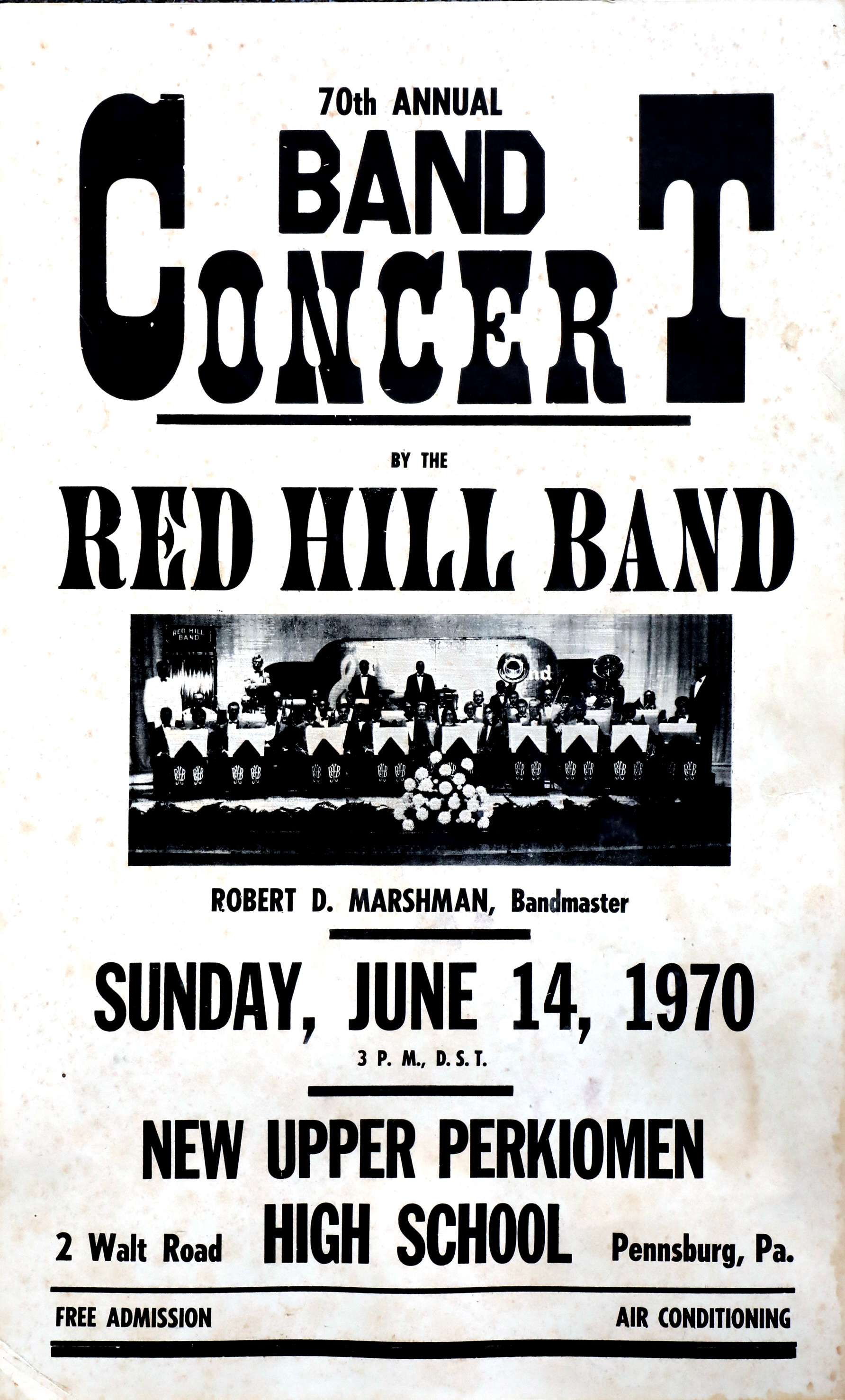
The 70th annual concert poster.

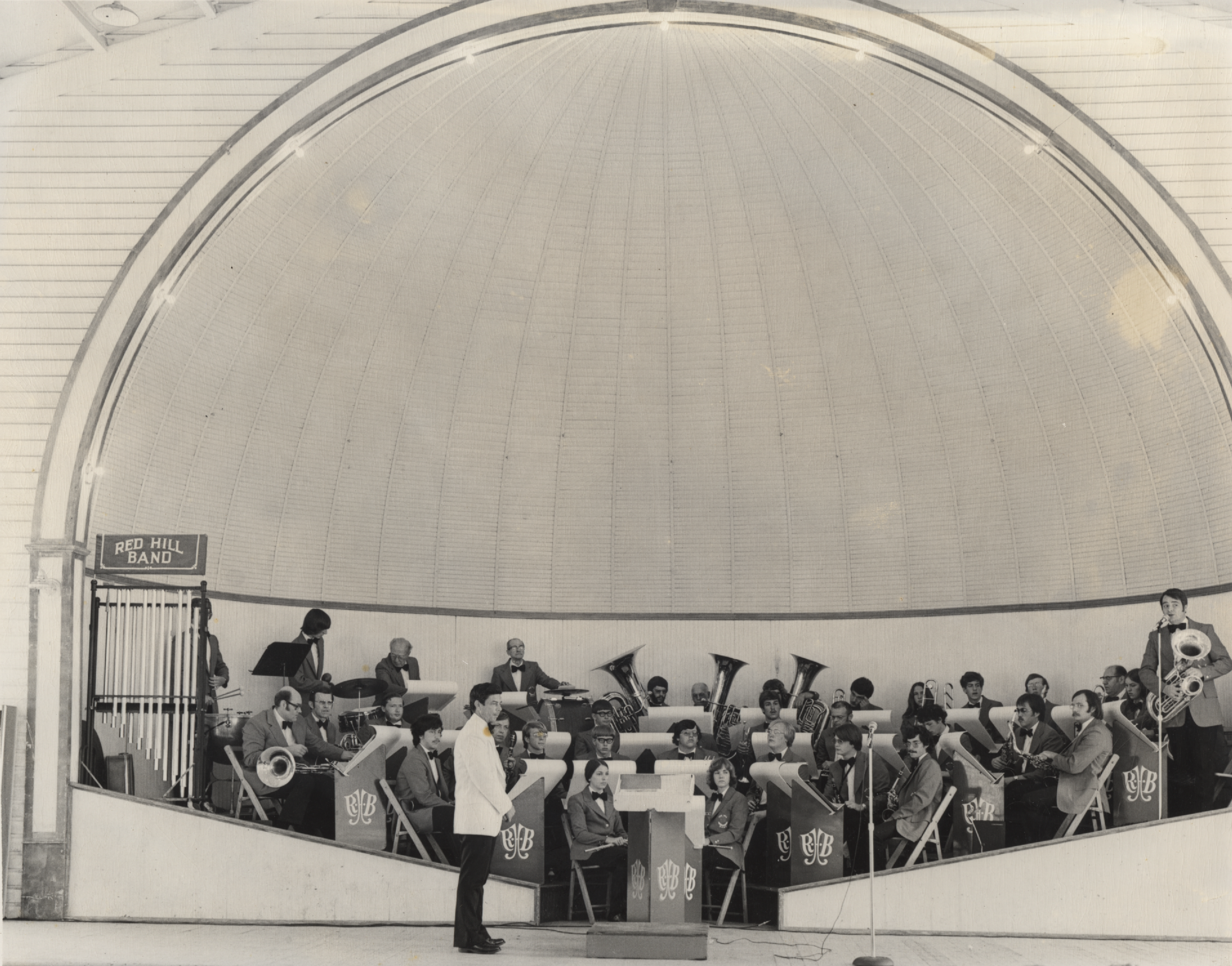
The Red Hill Band at the New Goshenhoppen band shell in the 1970s with director Vincent Bercher.

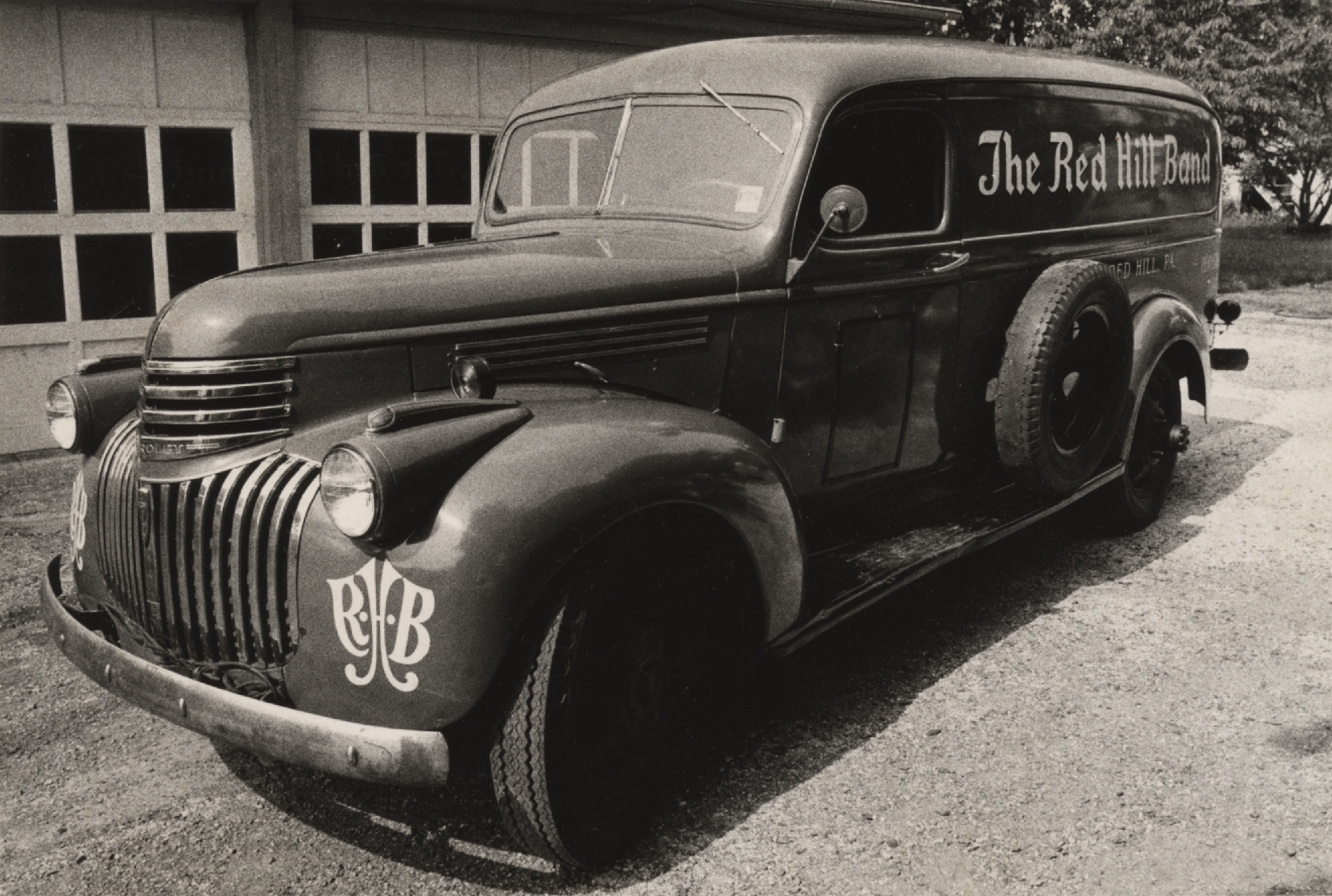
The vehicle used by the Red Hill Band to transport their instruments and travel to events in the 1940s.

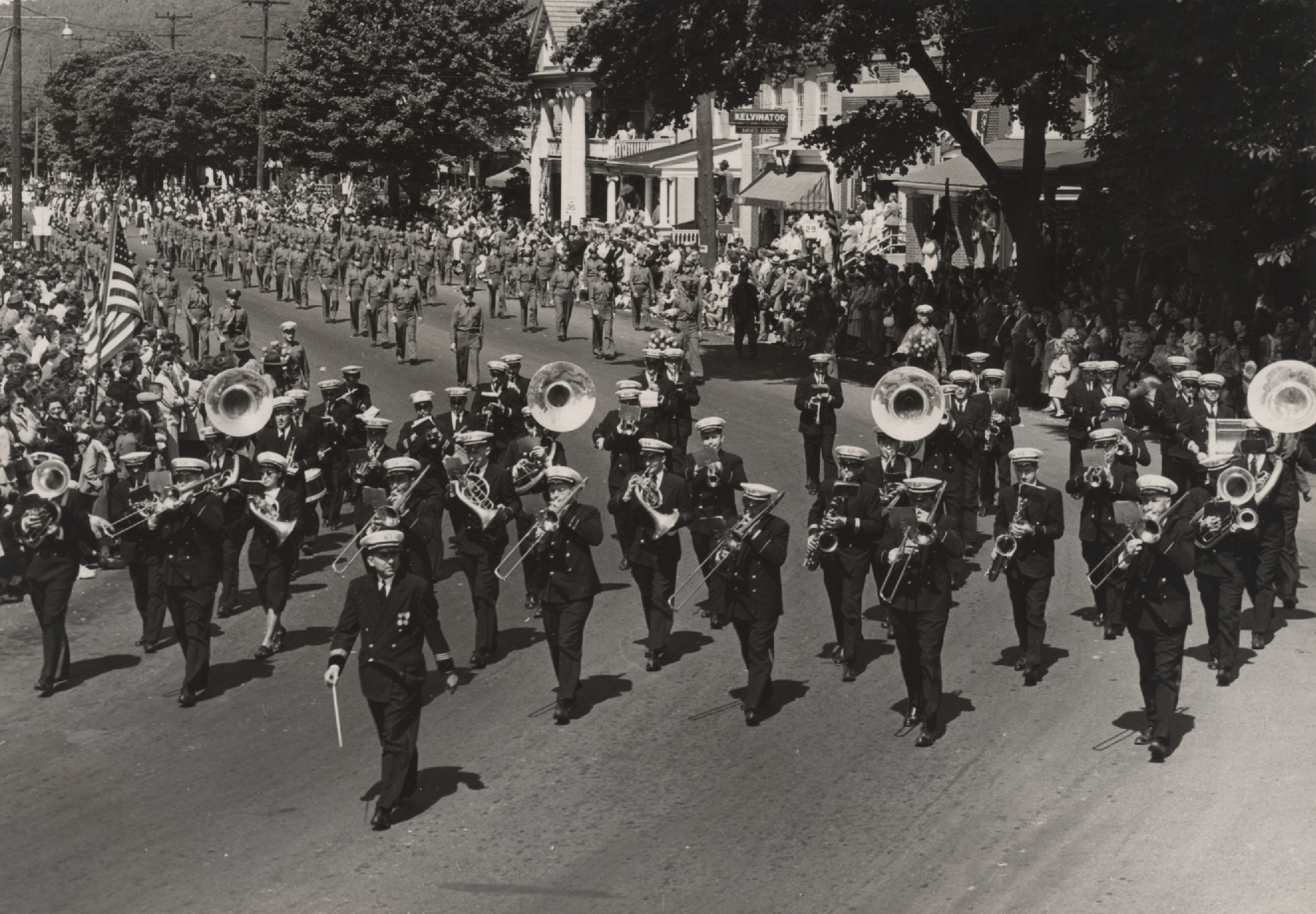
The Red Hill Band performing in a parade in the 1940s.

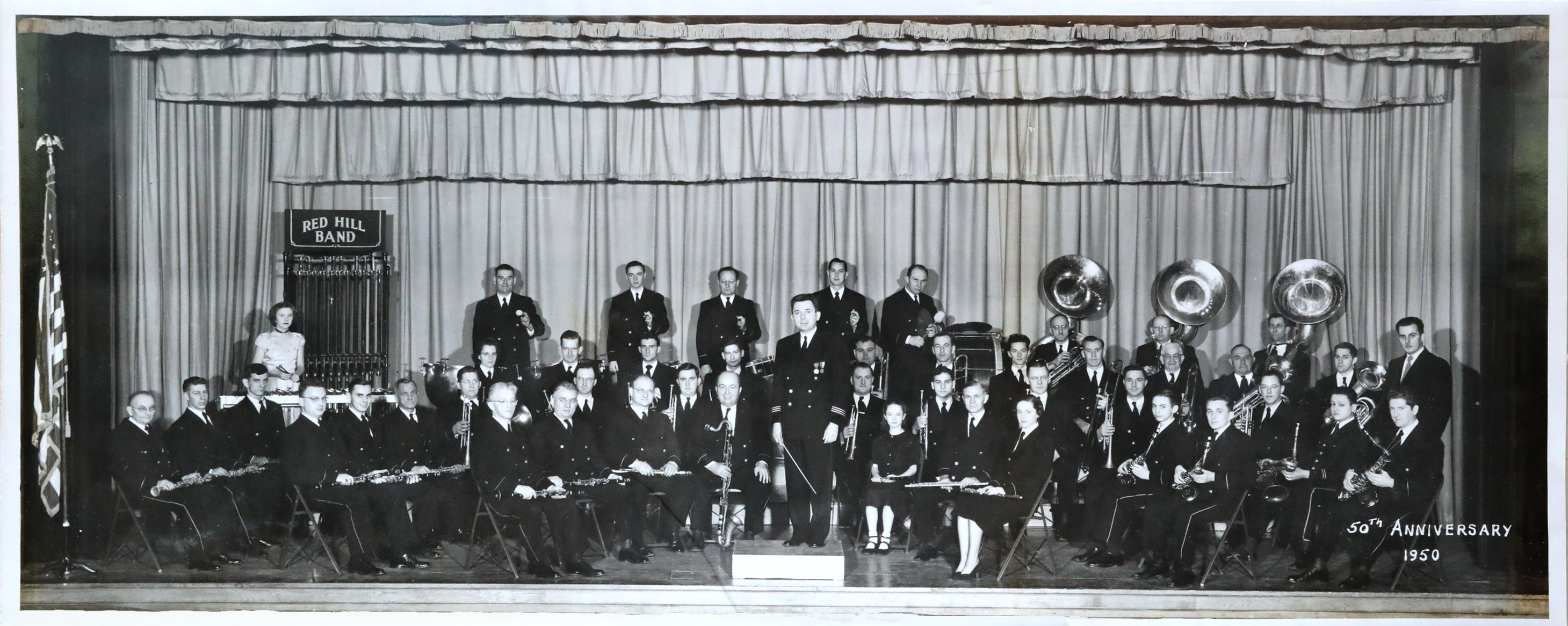
The Red Hill Band's 50th anniversary concert.

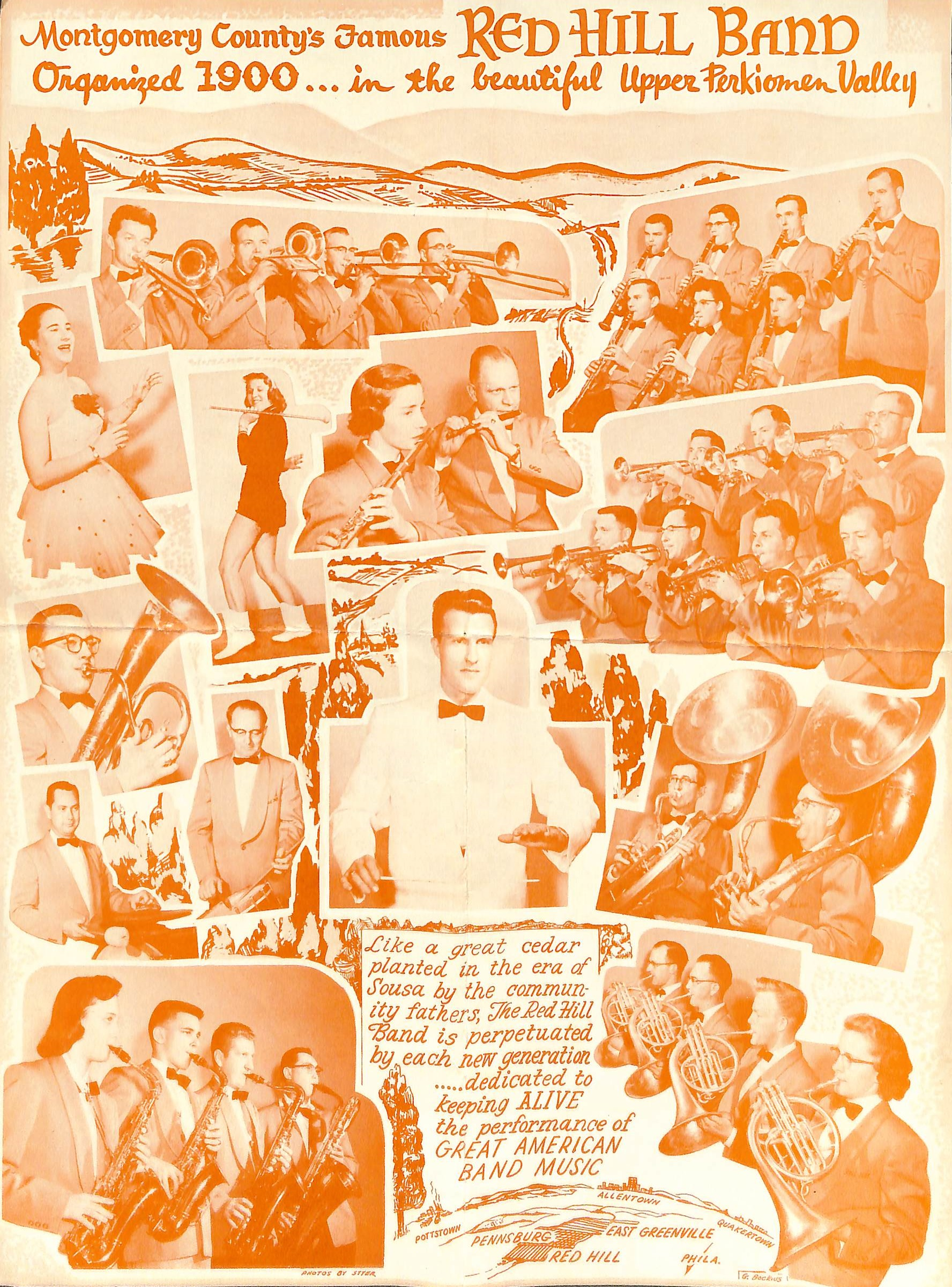
A collage poster made in the 1950s with pictures of the band members playing their instruments.

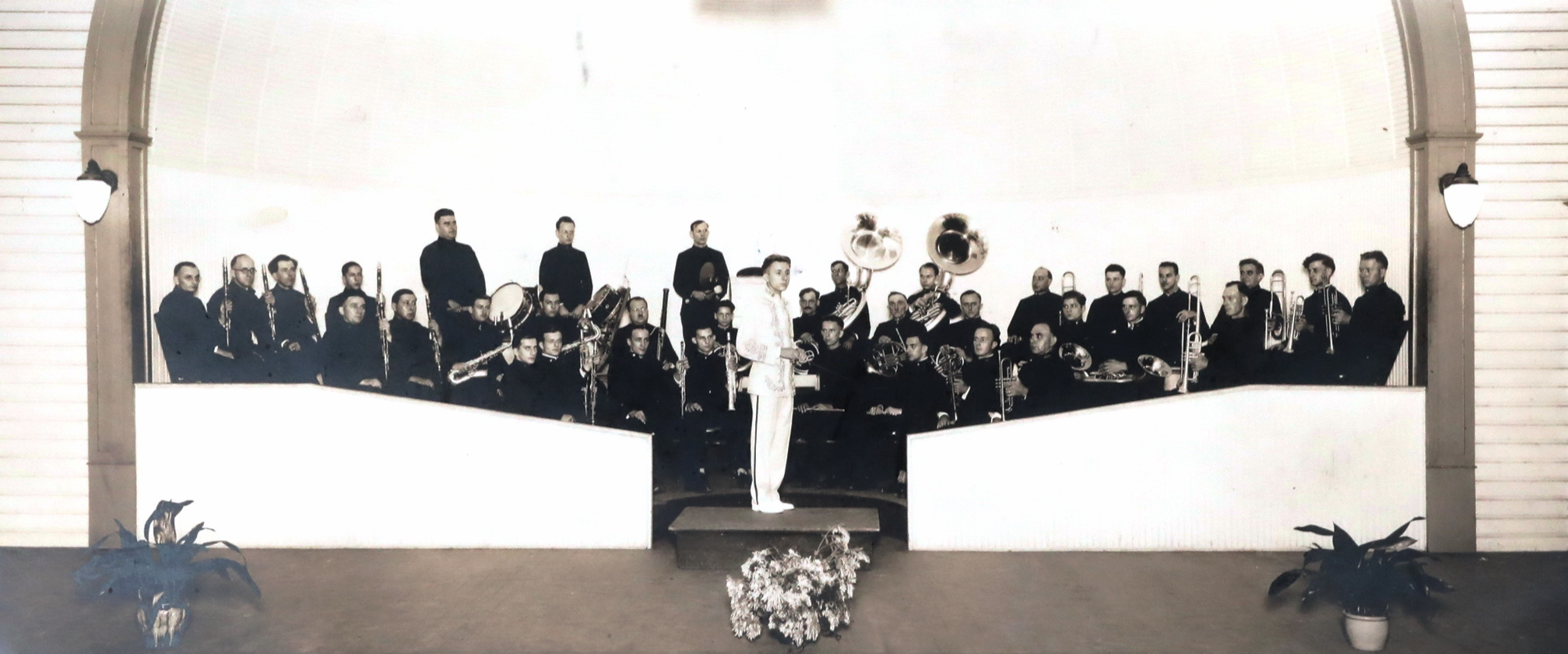
The Red Hill Band at the New Goshenhoppen band shell in the 1920s with Oliver K. Bernd as the director.

== Awards ==
- The Red Hill Band won $100 in May 1949 at a firemens parade in Boyertown.
- The Red Hill Band won the silver loving cup and a $250 prize in the ninth annual fireman's Labor Day parade in Washington DC.
- The Red Hill Band won the Perkiomen Valley Lions Club 1962 Good Deeds Award.
- The United States Senate commended the band for its "excellence and its state and community contributions" and Arthur K. Trauger presented the resolution to band member Jacob Fox on March 29, 1965.

== Directors ==
Oliver K. Bernd was only 19 years old when he was elected as the seventh director of the band.

Bercher taught at the Upper Perkiomen High School and often recruited members from the school.

- 1900 to 1901: Romanus Miller
- 1901 to 1903: Frederick Eddinger
- 1903: David E. Croll
- Horace Weil
- William C. Hillegass
- 1920 to 1926: Howard B. Pflieger
- 1926 to 1955: Oliver K. Bernd
- 1955 to 1974: Robert D. Marshman
- 1974 to 2015: Vincent P. Bercher
- 2015 to 2020: Norm Stull
- 2021 to 2022: Amanda Maldonado
- 2023 to present: George Pinchock

== Recordings ==
- The Red Hill Band in Concert (1996)
- The Red Hill Band on Parade (1997)
- The Red Hill Band on Broadway (1998)
- The Red Hill Band Highlights (1999)
