= East Greenville, Pennsylvania =

Borough in Pennsylvania, US

- Borough
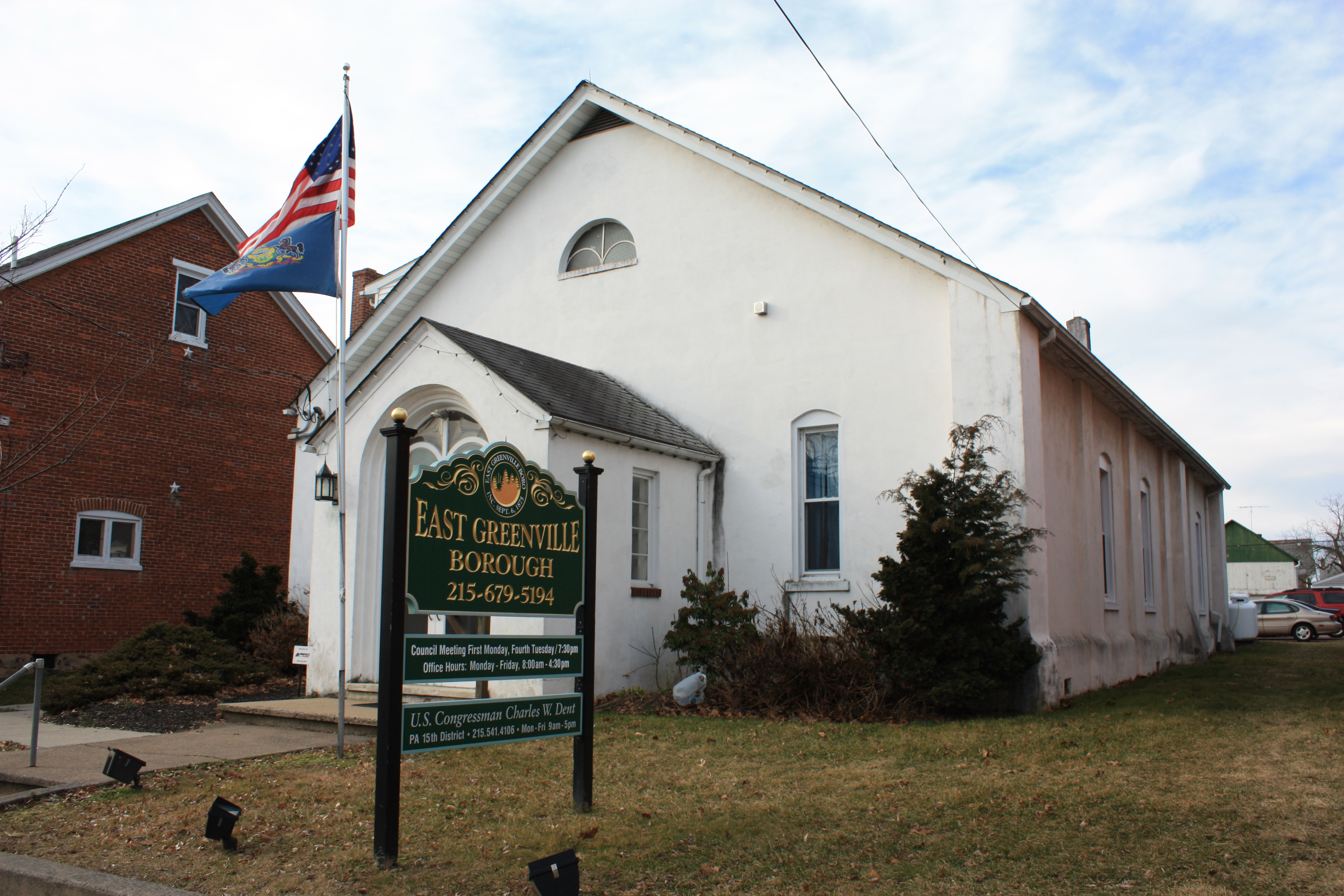
- East Greenville Borough Hall

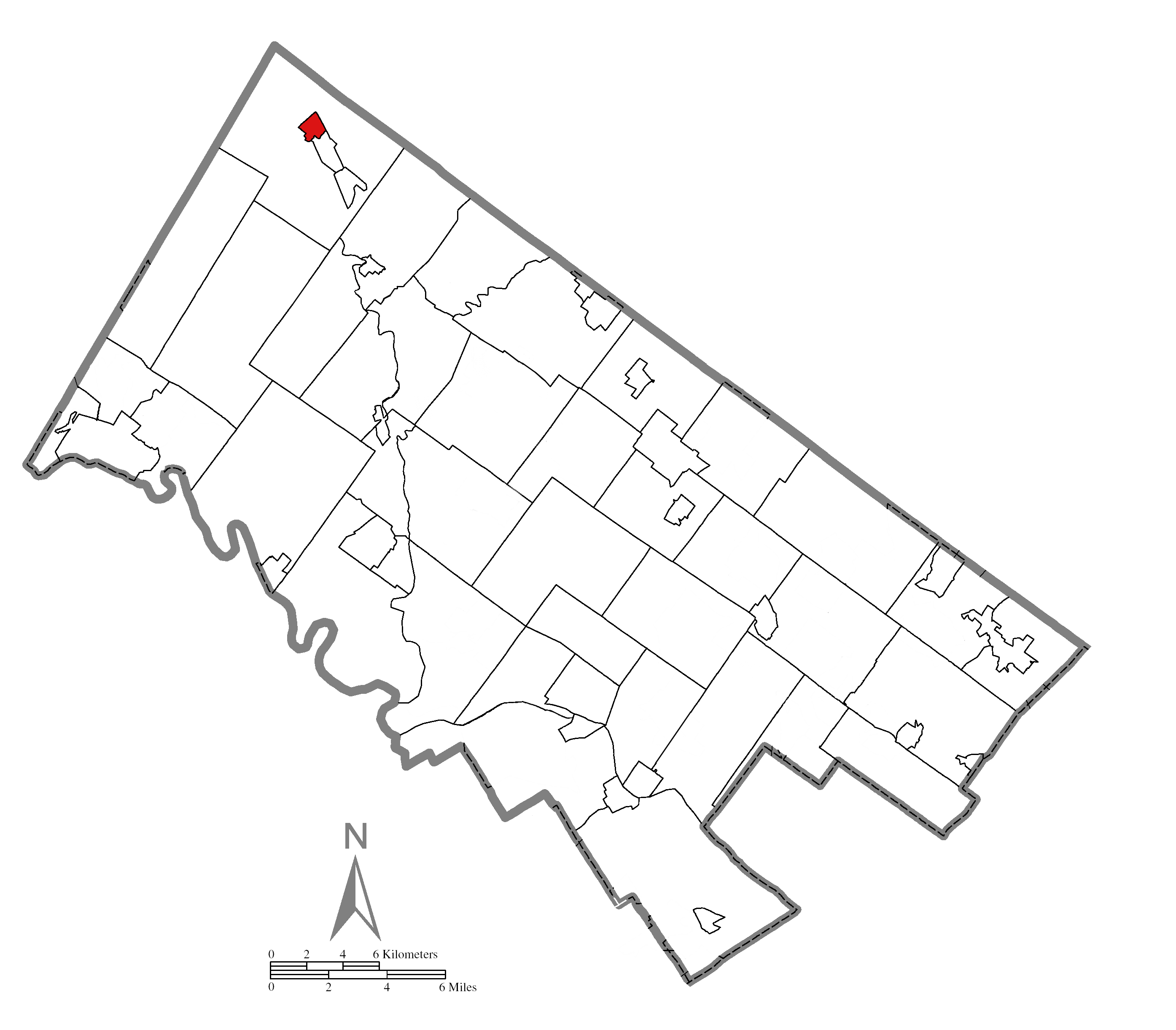
- Location of East Greenville in Montgomery County, Pennsylvania

- Location within Pennsylvania Location within the United States
- Coordinates: 40°24′20″N 75°30′15″W
- Country: United States
- State: Pennsylvania
- County: Montgomery
- Incorporated: 1875

Government
  - Type: Council-manager
  - Mayor: Stephen Wescott

Area
  - Total: 0.51 sq mi (1.33 km^{2})
  - Land: 0.51 sq mi (1.33 km^{2})
  - Water: 0 sq mi (0.00 km^{2})
- Elevation: 410 ft (120 m)

Population (2020)
  - Total: 3,166
  - Density: 6,188.4/sq mi (2,389.36/km^{2})
- Time zone: UTC-5 (EST)
  - Summer (DST): UTC-4 (EDT)
- ZIP Code: 18041
- Area codes: 215, 267, 445
- FIPS code: 42-21200
- School district: Upper Perkiomen School District
- Website: www.egreenville.org

East Greenville is a borough in Montgomery County, Pennsylvania, United States. The population was 3,166 at the 2020. It is one of a strip of small towns that run together along Route 29, including Red Hill, Pennsburg, and East Greenville. The borough is part of the Upper Perkiomen School District.

== History ==
In 1950, Hans and Florence Knoll moved the headquarters of their company Knoll (known for its modern furniture pieces by architects and designers such as Mies van der Rohe, Eero Saarinen, and Harry Bertoia) to the town, where it remains. In 2011, the Knoll factory employed about 700 people.

== Geography ==
East Greenville is located at 40°24′20″N 75°30′15″W (40.405626, −75.504144). According to the U.S. Census Bureau, the borough has a total area of 0.5 square miles (1.3 km^{2}), all land.

== Demographics ==
Historical population
Census	Pop.	Note	%±
1880	331		—
1890	589		77.9%
1900	894		51.8%
1910	1,235		38.1%
1920	1,620		31.2%
1930	1,749		8.0%
1940	1,776		1.5%
1950	1,945		9.5%
1960	1,931		−0.7%
1970	2,003		3.7%
1980	2,456		22.6%
1990	3,117		26.9%
2000	3,103		−0.4%
2010	2,951		−4.9%
2020	3,166		7.3%

=== 2020 census ===
As of the 2020 census, East Greenville had a population of 3,166. The median age was 34.4 years. 25.4% of residents were under the age of 18 and 11.0% of residents were 65 years of age or older. For every 100 females there were 100.0 males, and for every 100 females age 18 and over there were 96.2 males age 18 and over.

100.0% of residents lived in urban areas, while 0.0% lived in rural areas.

There were 1,212 households in East Greenville, of which 36.0% had children under the age of 18 living in them. Of all households, 44.6% were married-couple households, 18.7% were households with a male householder and no spouse or partner present, and 23.4% were households with a female householder and no spouse or partner present. About 23.7% of all households were made up of individuals and 5.8% had someone living alone who was 65 years of age or older.

There were 1,333 housing units, of which 9.1% were vacant. The homeowner vacancy rate was 1.0% and the rental vacancy rate was 5.7%.

Racial composition as of the 2020 census
Race	Number	Percent
White	2,819	89.0%
Black or African American	65	2.1%
American Indian and Alaska Native	1	0.0%
Asian	38	1.2%
Native Hawaiian and Other Pacific Islander	0	0.0%
Some other race	30	0.9%
Two or more races	213	6.7%
Hispanic or Latino (of any race)	192	6.1%

=== 2010 census ===
As of the 2010 census, the borough was 93.7% White, 2.3% Black or African American, 0.1% Native American, 1.0% Asian, and 1.9% were two or more races. 3.3% of the population were of Hispanic or Latino ancestry.

=== 2000 census ===
As of the 2000 census, there were 3,103 people, 1,124 households, and 805 families residing in the borough. The population density was 5,978.9 inhabitants per square mile (2,308.5/km^{2}). There were 1,173 housing units at an average density of 2,260.1 per square mile (872.6/km^{2}). The racial makeup of the borough was 96.78% White, 0.90% African American, 0.13% Native American, 0.52% Asian, 0.90% from other races, and 0.77% from two or more races. Hispanic or Latino of any race were 2.64% of the population.

There were 1,124 households, out of which 43.6% had children under the age of 18 living with them, 53.4% were married couples living together, 13.3% had a female householder with no husband present, and 28.3% were non-families. 22.7% of all households were made up of individuals, and 7.4% had someone living alone who was 65 years of age or older. The average household size was 2.76 and the average family size was 3.24.

In the borough, the population was spread out, with 31.4% under the age of 18, 7.6% from 18 to 24, 36.5% from 25 to 44, 16.6% from 45 to 64, and 7.8% who were 65 years of age or older. The median age was 32 years. For every 100 females there were 94.9 males. For every 100 females age 18 and over, there were 90.2 males.

The median income for a household in the borough was $46,875, and the median income for a family was $48,824. Males had a median income of $35,525 versus $29,358 for females. The per capita income for the borough was $19,066. About 3.6% of families and 5.1% of the population were below the poverty line, including 5.8% of those under age 18 and 5.0% of those age 65 or over.

== Government and politics ==
Presidential elections results
Year	Republican	Democratic
2020	49.7% 744	48.3% 724
2016	50.5% 604	42.6% 510
2012	49.2% 539	49.1% 538
2008	42.9% 499	55.7% 648
2004	50.5% 542	49.1% 527
2000	52.5% 434	43.4% 359

East Greenville has a city manager form of government with a mayor and borough council. The borough is part of the Fourth Congressional District (represented by Rep. Madeleine Dean), Pennsylvania's 131st Representative District (represented by Rep. Milou Mackenzie,) and the 24th State Senate District (represented by Sen. Bob Mensch.)

== Education ==
It is part of the Upper Perkiomen School District.. Students in grades nine through 12 attend Upper Perkiomen High School.

== Transportation ==
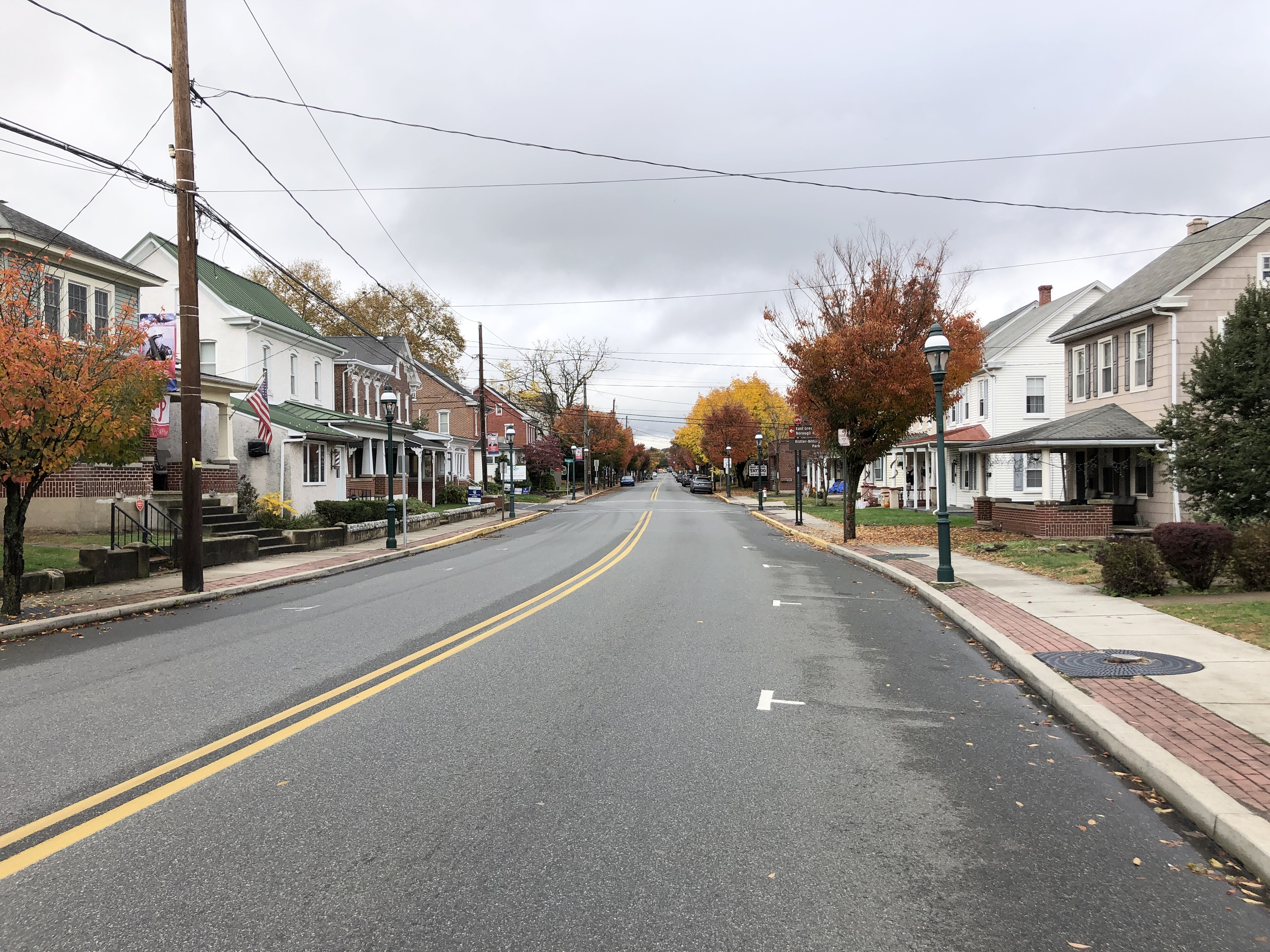
PA 29 northbound in East Greenville

As of 2010 there were 7.04 miles (11.33 km) of public roads in East Greenville, of which 0.73 miles (1.17 km) were maintained by the Pennsylvania Department of Transportation (PennDOT) and 6.31 miles (10.15 km) were maintained by the borough. Pennsylvania Route 29 is the only numbered highway serving East Greenville. It traverses the borough on a north-south alignment along Main Street.

== Notable people ==
- Sabrina Carpenter, singer, songwriter, actress
- Jean Faut, baseball player
- Drew Gulak, professional wrestler
