= Pennsylvania House of Representatives, District 131 =

American legislative district

Coordinates: 40.519°N 75.421°W

Pennsylvania's 131st State House of Representatives district
Representative
Milou Mackenzie; R–Lower Saucon Township
- Population (2022): 65,219

The 131st Pennsylvania House of Representatives District is located in Southeastern Pennsylvania and has been represented since 2020 by Milou Mackenzie

== District profile ==
The 131st Pennsylvania House of Representatives District is located within Lehigh County, Montgomery County and Northampton County. It includes Dillingersville Union School and Church and Red Hill Historic District. It is made up of the following areas:

- Lehigh County
  - Coopersburg
  - Lower Milford Township
  - Salisbury Township (PART, Ward 03 [PART, Division 01])
  - Upper Milford Township
  - Upper Saucon Township
- Montgomery County
  - East Greenville
  - Green Lane
  - Pennsburg
  - Red Hill
  - Marlborough Township
  - Salford Township
  - Upper Hanover Township
- Northampton County
  - Lower Saucon Township (PART, Districts 01, 02, 04, 07 and 08)

== Representatives ==
Representative	Party	Years	District home	Note
Prior to 1969, seats were apportioned by county.
James P. Ritter	Democrat	1969 – 1982		
Roy Afflerbach	Democrat	1983 – 1986		
Karen A. Ritter	Democrat	1987 – 1994		
Pat Browne	Republican	1995 – 2005	Allentown	Elected to the Pennsylvania State Senate
Karen D. Beyer	Republican	2005 – 2010	Lower Saucon Township	Elected in a special election on July 19, 2005, to fill vacancy.
Justin Simmons	Republican	2011 – 2020	Coopersburg	
Milou Mackenzie	Republican	2020 – Present	Lower Saucon Township	Incumbent

== Recent election results ==
PA House election, 2022: Pennsylvania House, District 131
Party	Candidate	Votes	%
Republican	Milou Mackenzie (incumbent)	18,071	54.89
Democratic	Kevin Branco	14,854	45.11
Total votes		32,925	100.00
Republican hold			

PA House election, 2020: Pennsylvania House, District 131
Party	Candidate	Votes	%
Republican	Milou Mackenzie	22,489	54.25
Democratic	Kevin Branco	18,964	45.75
Total votes		41,453	100.00
Republican hold			

PA House election, 2018: Pennsylvania House, District 131
Party	Candidate	Votes	%
Republican	Justin Simmons (incumbent)	15,579	52.82
Democratic	Andrew Lee	13,915	47.18
Total votes		29,494	100.00
Republican hold			

PA House election, 2016: Pennsylvania House, District 131
Party	Candidate	Votes	%
Republican	Justin Simmons (incumbent)	21,379	62.83
Democratic	Joanne Jackson	12,649	37.17
Total votes		34,028	100.00
Republican hold			

PA House election, 2014: Pennsylvania House, District 131
Party	Candidate	Votes	%
Republican	Justin Simmons (incumbent)	12,055	61.06
Democratic	Michael Beyer	7,688	38.94
Total votes		19,743	100.00
Republican hold			

PA House election, 2012: Pennsylvania House, District 131
Party	Candidate	Votes	%
Republican	Justin Simmons (incumbent)	14,301	50.76
Democratic	Kevin Deely, Jr.	13,872	49.24
Total votes		28,173	100.00
Republican hold			

PA House election, 2010: Pennsylvania House, District 131
Party	Candidate	Votes	%
Republican	Justin Simmons	10,769	56.90
Democratic	Mike Horton	8,156	43.10
Total votes		18,925	100.00
Republican hold			
