= Red Hill, Pennsylvania =

Borough in Pennsylvania, US

Borough of Red Hill
- Borough
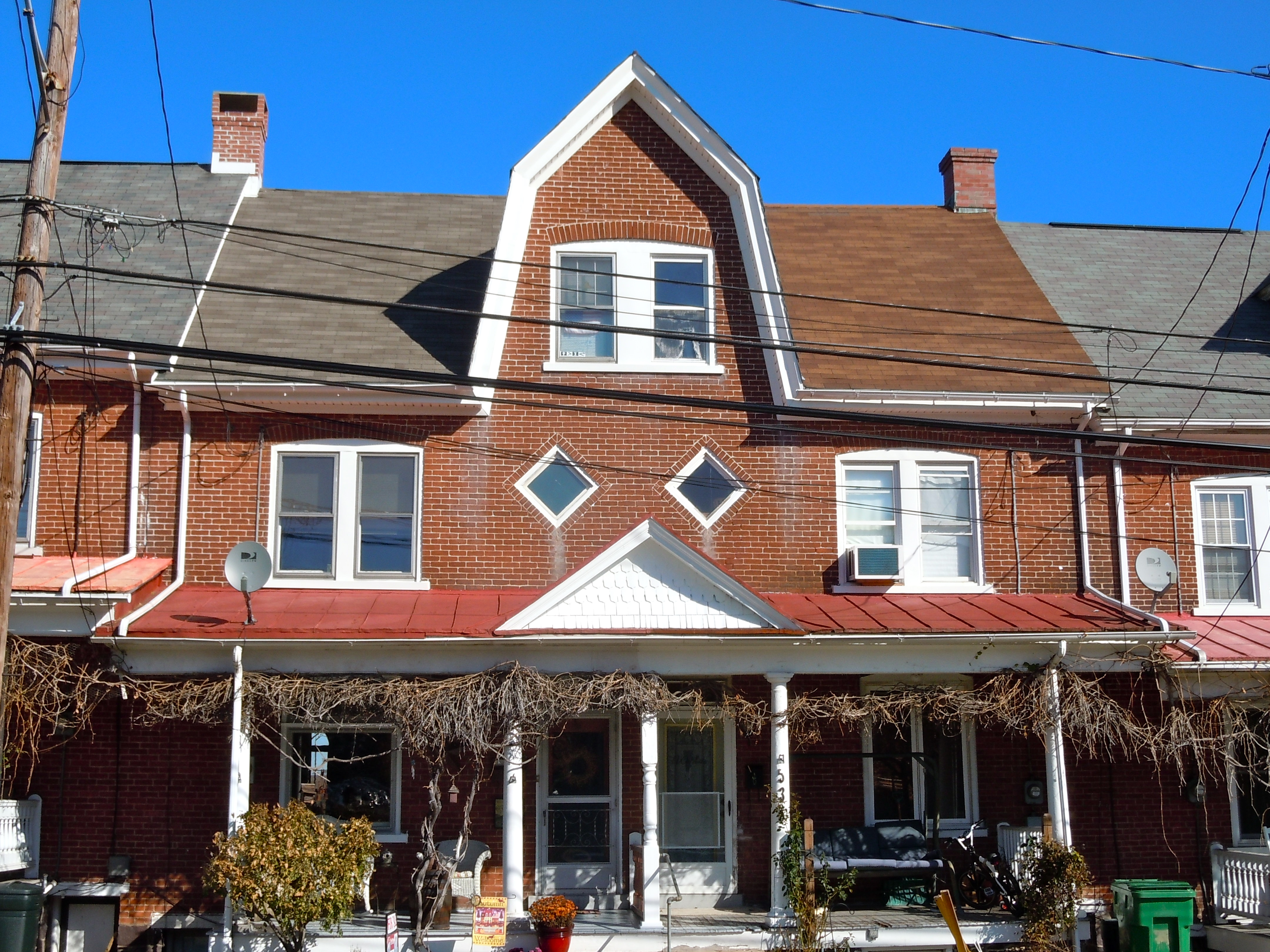
- House in the historic district

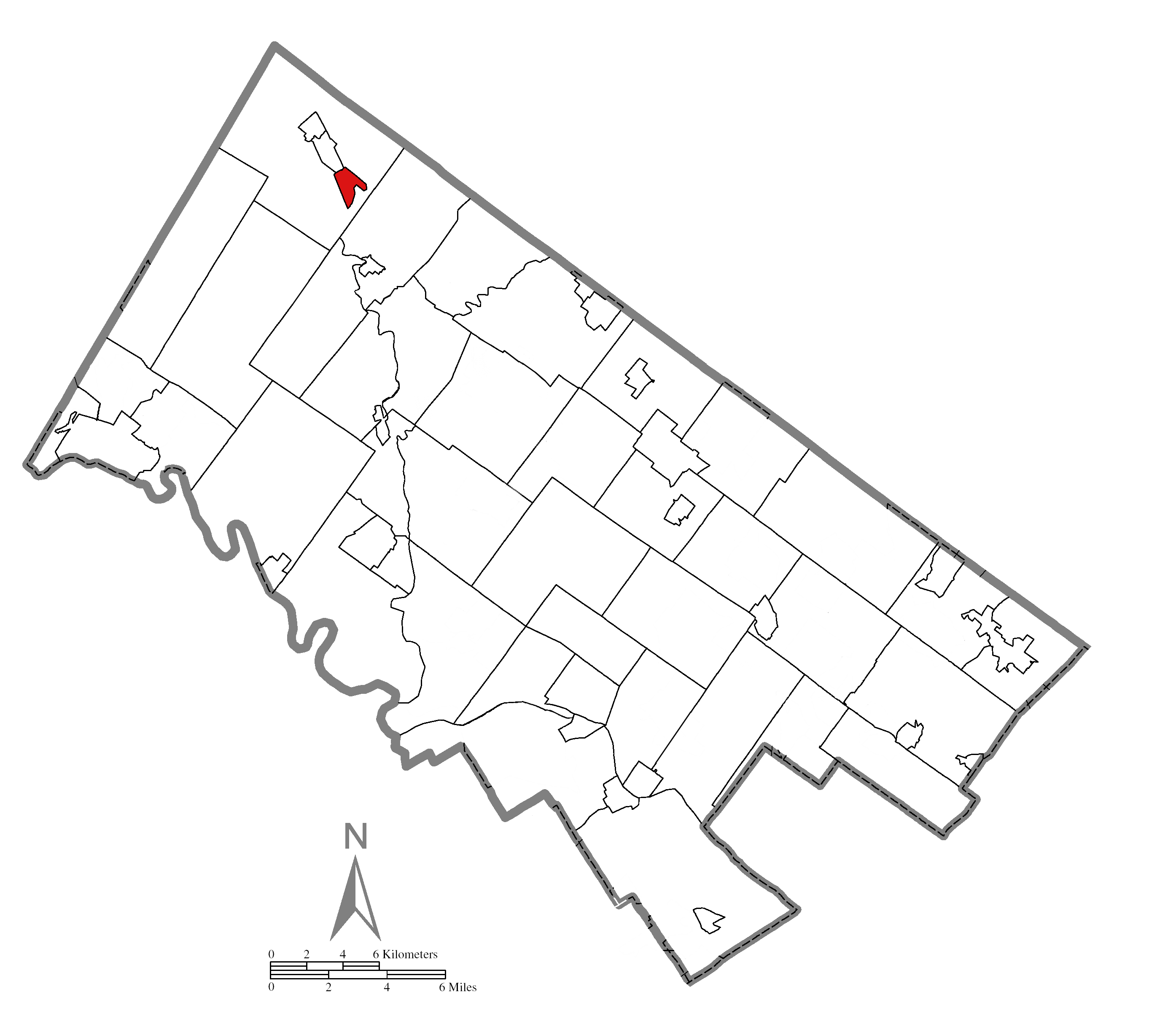
- Location of Red Hill in Montgomery County, Pennsylvania

- Location of Red Hill in Pennsylvania Red Hill (the United States)
- Coordinates: 40°22′35″N 75°29′04″W
- Country: United States
- State: Pennsylvania
- County: Montgomery

Government
  - Type: Council-manager
  - Mayor: David Schiffgens

Area
  - Total: 0.67 sq mi (1.73 km^{2})
  - Land: 0.67 sq mi (1.73 km^{2})
  - Water: 0 sq mi (0.00 km^{2})
- Elevation: 358 ft (109 m)

Population (2020)
  - Total: 2,496
  - Density: 3,739.3/sq mi (1,443.77/km^{2})
- Time zone: UTC-5 (EST)
  - Summer (DST): UTC-4 (EDT)
- ZIP Codes: 18073, 18076
- Area codes: 215, 267, and 445
- FIPS code: 42-63808
- School district: Upper Perkiomen School District
- Website: https://www.redhillborough.org/

Red Hill is a borough in Montgomery County, Pennsylvania, United States. It is primarily a lakeshore, lowlands, suburban community northwest of Philadelphia in the Delaware River Valley watershed, as is the balance of its county. As of the 2020 census, Red Hill had a population of 2,496.

It is also part of the strip of small towns that run together along Route 29, Red Hill, Pennsburg, and East Greenville, colloquially known as Upper Perkiomen. The town is named after the large amounts of red shale in the soil and ground layers of the hill.

== History ==
The Red Hill Historic District was added to the National Register of Historic Places in 1985. The borough is home to the Red Hill Band, which is older than the borough itself.

== Geography ==
Red Hill is located at 40°22′35″N 75°29′4″W (40.376288, -75.484308). According to the U.S. Census Bureau, the borough has a total area of 0.7 square miles (1.8 km^{2}), all land.

== Transportation ==
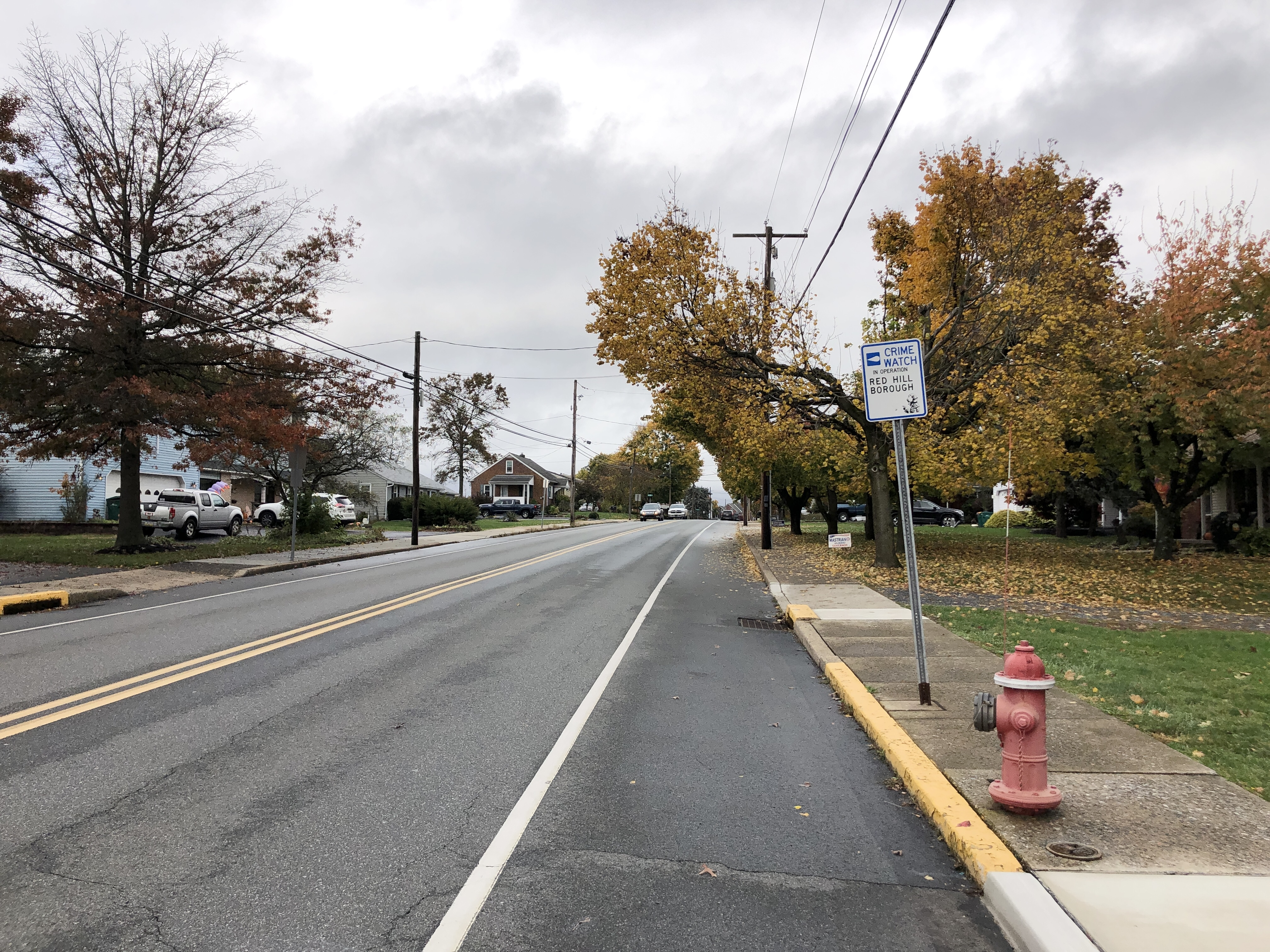
PA 29 northbound in Red Hill

As of 2010 there were 9.42 miles (15.16 km) of public roads in Red Hill, of which 1.65 miles (2.66 km) were maintained by the Pennsylvania Department of Transportation (PennDOT) and 7.77 miles (12.50 km) were maintained by the borough.

Pennsylvania Route 29 is the only numbered highway serving Red Hill. It traverses the borough on a north–south alignment following Main Street.

== Demographics ==
Historical population
Census	Pop.	Note	%±
1910	664		—
1920	787		18.5%
1930	851		8.1%
1940	881		3.5%
1950	914		3.7%
1960	1,086		18.8%
1970	1,201		10.6%
1980	1,727		43.8%
1990	1,794		3.9%
2000	2,196		22.4%
2010	2,383		8.5%
2020	2,496		4.7%
U.S. Decennial Census

As of the 2010 census, the borough was 96.4% White, 1.4% Black or African American, 0.7% Asian, and 1.3% were two or more races. About 2.1% of the population were of Hispanic or Latino ancestry..

As of the census, of 2000, 2,196 people, 899 households, and 576 families were residing in the borough. The population density was 3,046.0 inhabitants per square mile (1,176.1/km^{2}). The 944 housing units averaged 1,309.4 per mi (506.2/km^{2}). The racial makeup of the borough was 97.81% White, 0.32% African American, 0.05% Native American, 0.09% Asian, 0.37% from other races, and 1.37% from two or more races. Hispanics or Latinos of any race were 1.55% of the population.

Of the 899 households, 27.7% had children under the age of 18 living with them, 52.5% were married couples living together, 8.1% had a female householder with no husband present, and 35.9% were not families. About 30.1% of all households were made up of individuals, and 19.2% had someone living alone who was 65 years of age or older. The average household size was 2.44 and the average family size was 3.08.

In the borough, the age distribution was 23.8% under 18, 7.4% from 18 to 24, 28.4% from 25 to 44, 22.4% from 45 to 64, and 18.1% who were 65 or older. The median age was 38 years. For every 100 females, there were 91.1 males. For every 100 females age 18 and over, there were 87.2 males. The median income for a household in the borough was $45,313, and for a family was $58,529. Males had a median income of $35,857 versus $26,295 for females. The per capita income for the borough was $20,633. About 3.1% of families and 4.1% of the population were below the poverty line, including 2.3% of those under age 18 and 10.8% of those age 65 or over.

== Politics and government ==
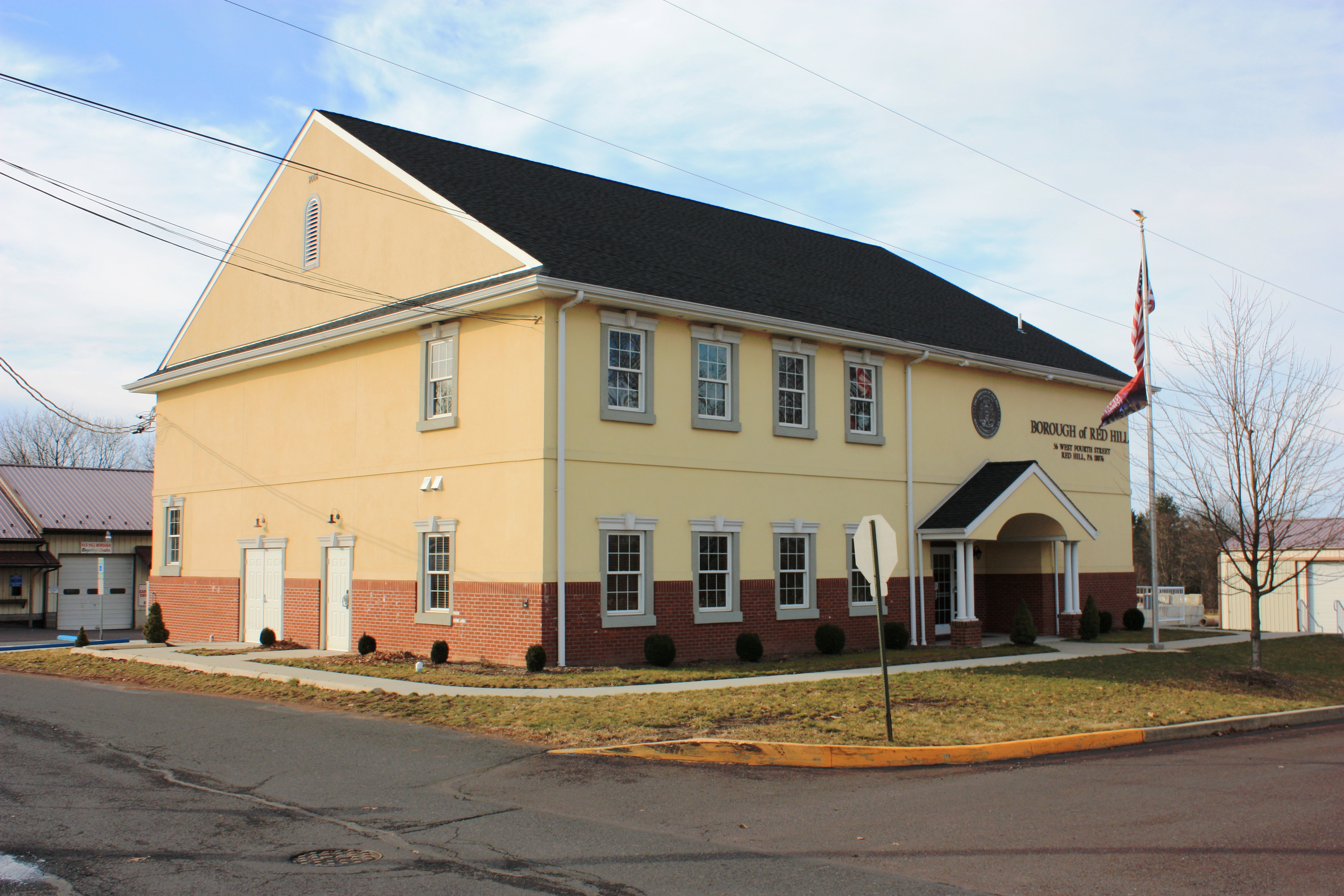
Red Hill Borough Hall

Red Hill has a city manager form of government with a mayor and borough council. The borough president of Red Hill is Doris Decker.

The borough is part of Pennsylvania's 4th Congressional District (represented by Rep. Madeleine Dean), Pennsylvania's 131st Representative District (represented by Rep. Milou Mackenzie), and the 24th State Senate District (represented by Sen. Bob Mensch).

Presidential elections results
Year	Republican	Democratic
2020	49.5% 717	48.1% 696
2016	52.8% 639	41.4% 501
2012	48.7% 541	49.8% 553
2008	41.2% 470	56.6% 643
2004	47.9% 491	51.2% 525
2000	48.8% 369	47.0% 355

== Education ==
Red Hill is served by the Upper Perkiomen School District.

Christian Elementary School and Upper Perkiomen High School are in the Borough of Red Hill.
