= Schwenkfelder Church =

American Protestant church

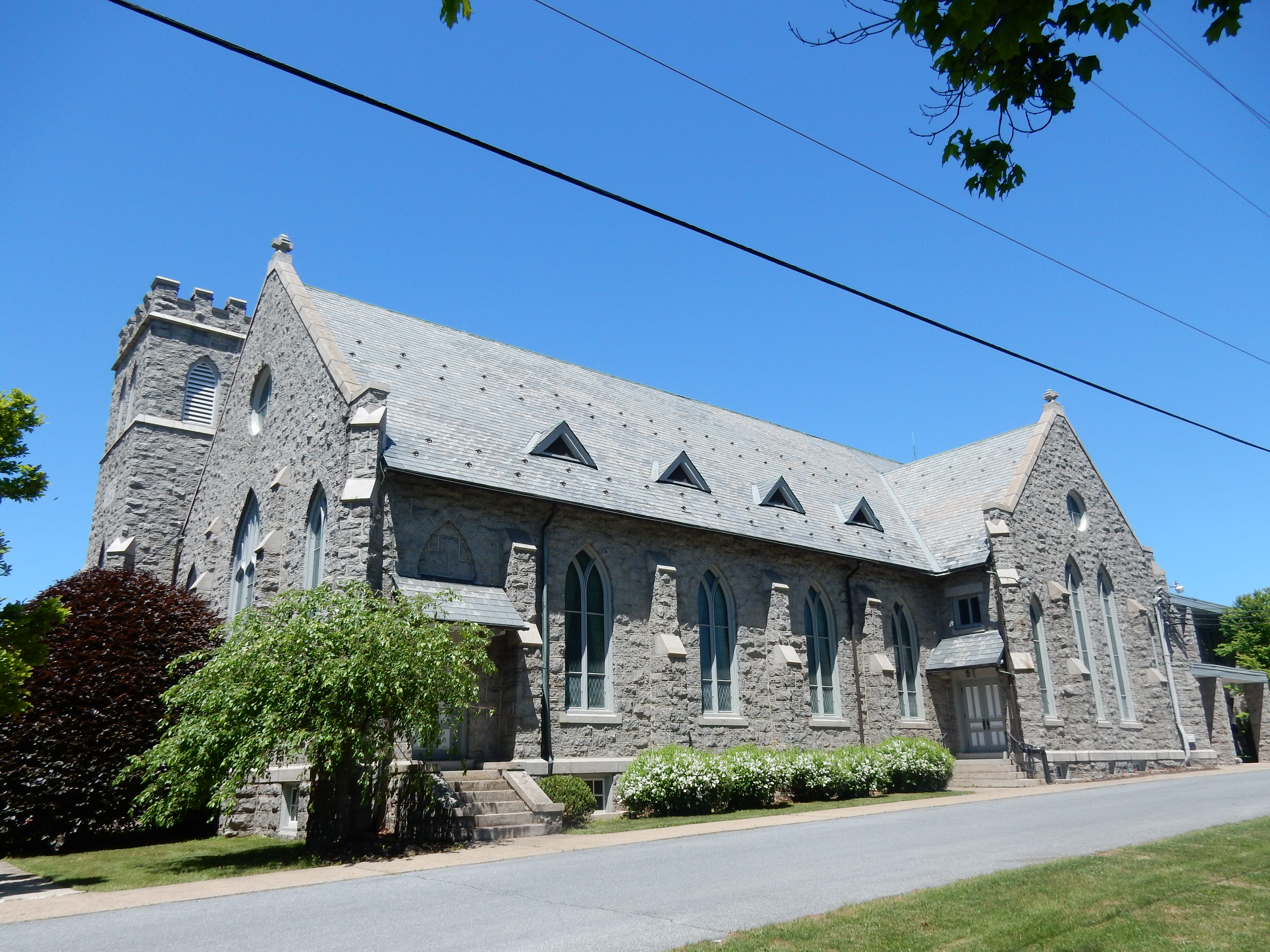
- Schwenkfelder Church in Palm, PA
- Classification: Protestant
- Orientation: Anabaptist
- Region: United States
- Origin: 1909; Pennsylvania, U.S.
- Congregations: 4 (2024)
- Members: 2,695 (2010)
- Official website: schwenkfelderchurch.org

The Schwenkfelder Church is a small American Christian body rooted in the 16th-century Protestant Reformation teachings of Caspar Schwenkfeld von Ossig (1489–1561). They originated in Silesia. Due to persecution, they migrated to Saxony (Germany) then through the Netherlands and England. Six migrations brought the Schwenkfelders to America. The largest group arrived on September 22, 1734.

== History ==
Although followers have held the teachings of Schwenkfeld since the 16th century, Schwenkfelder Church was not formed until the 20th century, due in large part to Schwenkfeld's emphasis on inner spirituality over outward form. He also labored for a fellowship of all believers and one church.

Originally calling themselves Confessors of the Glory of Christ after Schwenkfeld's 1541 book Great Confession on the Glory of Christ, the group later became known as Schwenkfelders. These Christians often suffered persecution like slavery, prison, and fines at the hands of the government and state churches in Europe. Most of them lived in southern Germany and Lower Silesia.

The Schwenkfelders are mentioned by the early Lutherans who included a critique of their theology in their confessional documents, the Epitome of the Formula of Concord and the Solid Declaration of the Formula of Concord (1577). The Lutherans specifically rejected the following teachings of the "Schwenkfeldians":

1. All those who regard Christ as a creature according to the flesh have no true knowledge of Christ as the reigning King of heaven.

2. By exaltation, Christ’s flesh has assumed all divine properties with this result: Christ as man is in might, power, majesty, and glory altogether (as regards degree and position) of equal essence to the Father and to the Word. So now there is only one essence, property, will, and glory of both natures in Christ. And now Christ’s flesh belongs to the essence of the holy Trinity.

3. The ministry of the Church—the Word preached and heard—is not the means God the Holy Spirit uses to teach people and work in them the saving knowledge of Christ, conversion, repentance, faith, and new obedience.

4. The water of Baptism is not how God the Lord seals the adoption of sons and works regeneration.

5. Bread and wine in the Holy Supper are not means through and by which Christ gives us His body and blood.

6. A Christian who is truly regenerated by God’s Spirit can perfectly keep and fulfill God’s Law in this life.

7. A congregation ‹church› that does not excommunicate or regularly ban people is not truly Christian.

8. A minister of the Church who is not truly renewed, regenerate, righteous, and godly cannot helpfully teach other people or distribute genuine, true Sacraments.

By the beginning of the 18th century, the remaining Schwenkfelders lived around Harpersdorf in the Duchy of Silesia, which was part of the Bohemian Crown. As the persecution intensified around 1719–1725, they were given refuge in 1726 by Nicolaus Ludwig von Zinzendorf in Saxony. When the Elector of Saxony died in 1733, Jesuits petitioned the new ruler to return the Schwenkfelders to Harpersdorf. With their freedom in jeopardy, they decided to look to the New World; toleration was also extended to them in Silesia in 1742 by King Frederick II of Prussia.

The immigrant members of the Schwenkfelder Church brought saffron to the Americas. Schwenkfelders may have grown saffron in Europe; there is some record that at least one member of the group traded in the spice.

In 1731, a group came to Philadelphia, Pennsylvania, and several migrations continued until 1737. The largest group, 180 Schwenkfelders, arrived on September 22, 1734. The leader of their group was George Weiss, who buried his wife Anna Meschter Weiss in Philadelphia the day after their arrival. On September 24, 1734 (two days after arriving and one day after the burial), he led the very first Day of Remembrance service. This service continues to this day each year on the Sunday closest to September 24.

In 1782, the Society of Schwenkfelders was formed, and in 1909 the Schwenkfelder Church was incorporated. Though the Schwenkfelders thereafter remained largely confined to Pennsylvania, a small number later emigrated to Waterloo County in Ontario, Canada.

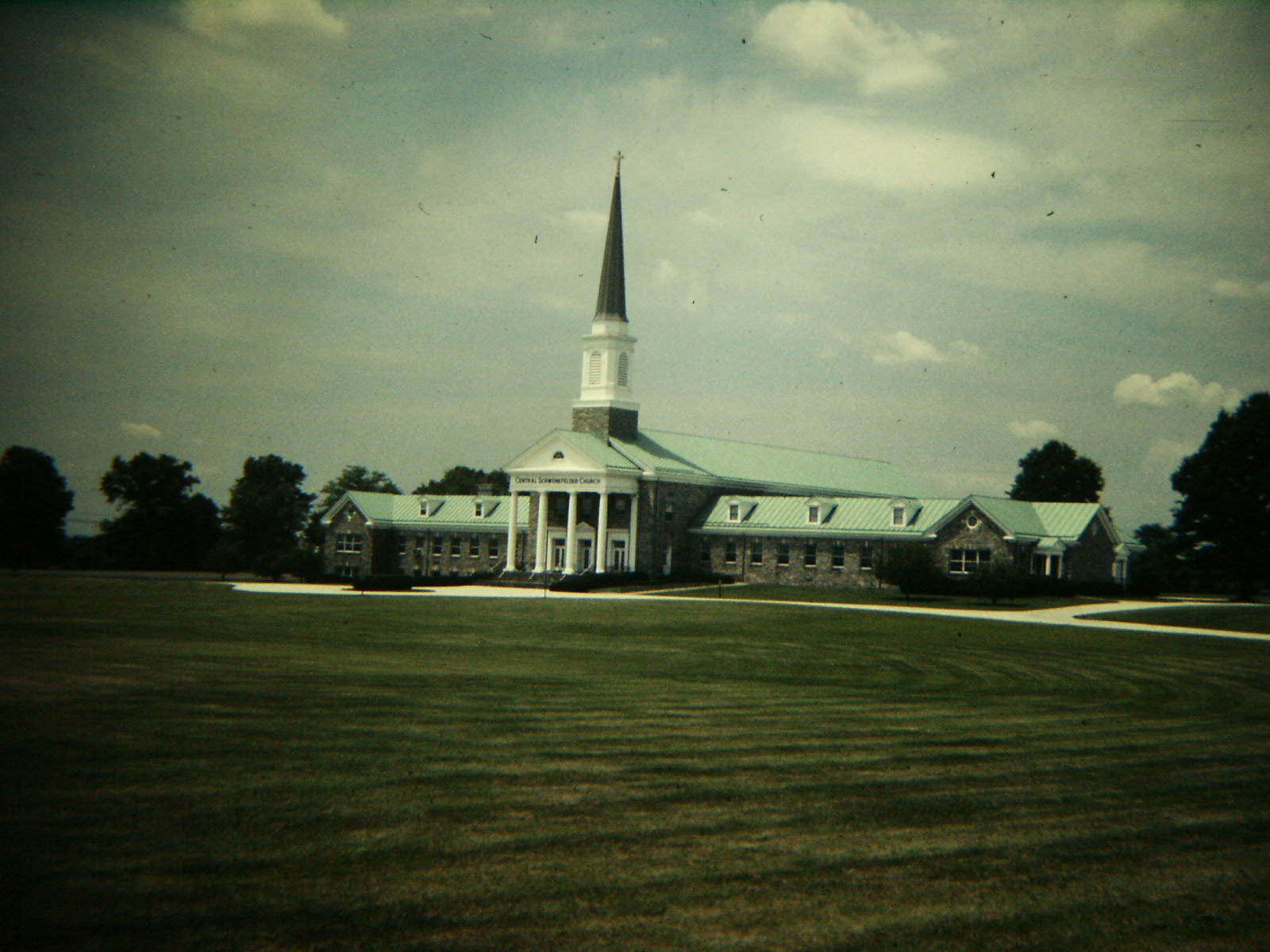
Central Schwenkfelder Church in Worcester, PA

The Schwenkfelder Church has remained small. As of 2024, there are four congregations in southeastern Pennsylvania. All of these bodies are within a fifty-mile radius of Philadelphia: one in the city itself, and one each in East Norriton, Palm, and Worcester.

The Schwenkfelders meet each year to remember their migration to America on the Sunday closest to September 24. It is the longest running continuous running thanksgiving service in America and is held at one of the Schwenkfelder churches. They also meet on the first Saturday of February for Christian Education at the Schwenkfelder Library and Heritage Center in Pennsburg, PA. On the first Sunday in June, they meet for historic worship at the Salford Meeting House in Lower Salford Township.

== Characteristics ==
The Church teaches that the Bible is the source of Christian theology. Schwenckfeld drew his theology from the Old Testament and New Testament, and it agrees with the Apostles' Creed, the Nicene Creed, and the Confession of Chalcedon.

The Church also recognizes the wisdom of church fathers, particularly those from the Eastern Church and Augustine. Schwenckfeld emphasized the inner work of the Holy Spirit, conversion (which he called the rebirth), and the new man.

The Church also continues his belief that the Lord's Supper is a spiritual partaking representing the body and blood of Christ in open communion. Adult baptism and both infant baptism and consecration of infants is practiced depending on the church.

Adult members are also received into church membership through transfer of memberships from other churches and denominations. Their ecclesiastical tradition is congregational with an ecumenical focus. The Schwenkfelder churches recognize the right of the individual in decisions such as public service, armed combat, etc. Individual, autonomous congregations select ministers by a self-regulated search process. Ministers and church representatives gather regularly in the Schwenkfelder Ministerium, managing the church through congregational government.

Schwenkfelder theology fits broadly within the parameters of Reformed theology today. Each congregation remains autonomous in theology and practice. Historic statements of faith inherited by the Christian Church as a whole, including the Apostles' Creed and other scriptural foundations, remain the best representative statement of Schwenkfeldian theology.

Later Schwenkfelder theology also exhibits significant correspondence to the Pietists. This can be seen in the parallels to the writings of Pietists such as Philipp Jakob Spener.

== Related Organizations ==
=== Society of the Descendants of the Schwenkfeldian Exiles ===
The Society of the Descendants of the Schwenkfeldian Exiles is a lineage society for descendants of the 209 members of the Schwenkfelder Church who arrived near Penn's Landing between 1731 and 1737 and settled in what then was the colonial-era Province of Pennsylvania. It was founded in 1921 by William Wagener Porter and had an initial membership of 125 individuals. Publications include Exile Herald (1924–1954) and Der Bericht.

=== Schwenkfelder Library & Heritage Center ===
The Schwenkfelder Library & Heritage Center is a not-for-profit historical library, archive, and museum located in Pennsburg, Pennsylvania, whose mission is "protect, preserve and interpret books, manuscripts and artifacts of the Schwenkfelders and the people of southeastern Pennsylvania in general and the Perkiomen Valley in particular."
