= Karen Ritter =

American politician

Karen A. Ritter

Member of the Pennsylvania House of Representatives from the 131st district
- In office January 6, 1987 – November 30, 1994
- Preceded by: Roy Afflerbach
- Succeeded by: Pat Browne

Personal details
- Born: February 28, 1953 (age 73) Shirley, Massachusetts, U.S.
- Party: Democratic

Karen A. Ritter (born February 28, 1953) is a former American government official. A member of the Democratic Party, she represented Lehigh County in the Pennsylvania House of Representatives from 1987 to 1994.

== Early life ==
Born in Shirley, Massachusetts on February 28, 1953, Ritter graduated from L. E. Dieruff High School in 1971 and earned her paralegal certificate from Northampton Community College in 1978.

== Career ==
Employed as a manager of a title insurance agency, Ritter was elected to a seat on the Allentown City Council in Allentown, Pennsylvania, and served in that capacity from 1982 to 1986. In 1986, she chaired the council's community development committee.

A member of the Lehigh Valley Democratic Association, the Lehigh Valley Young Democrats and the Pennsylvania Federation of Democratic Women, she ran for a seat in the Pennsylvania House of Representatives in 1986, was elected for its 1987 term, and was then reelected to serve three additional, consecutive terms. During her tenure with the House, she was appointed as deputy whip. A member of the Legislative Budget and Finance Committee from 1989 to 1994, she was also appointed to the Select Committee on Domestic Violence and Rape Crisis Services in Pennsylvania in 1990.

Unsuccessful in her 1994 bid to become lieutenant governor of Pennsylvania, she chose not to run for reelection to the Pennsylvania House for its 1995 term.

Ritter has been the president of Strategic Communications Consultants since 1994.
