= Mary Emma Griffith Marshall =

American editor and librarian (1888-1925)

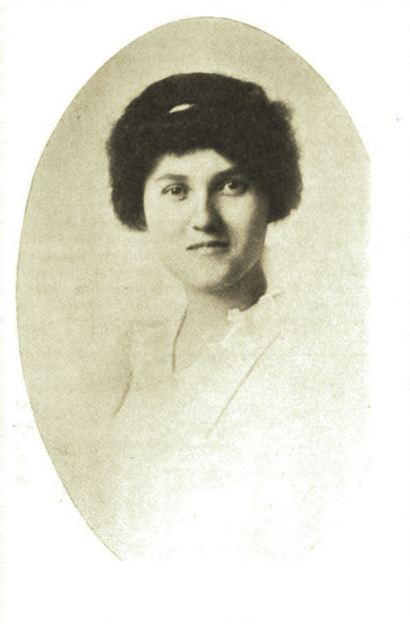
Marshall in 1925

Mary Emma Griffith Marshall (née Griffith; 1888–1925) was an American editor and librarian who served in these capacities for the Bureau of Markets, U.S. Department of Agriculture, 1913–1919. She also served in various roles for her sorority, Alpha Chi Omega: National Secretary, 1915–1919; National Secretary-Editor, The Lyre, 1919 till her death; and compiler, The Directory, 1920 and 1923 editions.

== Early life and education ==
Mary Emma Griffith was born in Pennsburg, Pennsylvania, on August 10, 1888, to James Harry and Laura Jane (Eckel) Griffith.

She attended Perkiomen Seminary in Pennsburg. In 1905, she graduated as valedictorian of her class from Washington High School in Washington, New Jersey.

In 1910, Marshall was graduated cum laude from Syracuse University with an A.B. degree. During her college course, she was engaged in many activities, among them her fraternity (Alpha Chi Omega, Lambda), YWCA, and athletics. She was a member of the Syracuse University Alumni Association and was secretary of the Washington branch at the time of her death.

Marshall was very active in church work. She taught a Sunday School class at the University Avenue Methodist Episcopal Church (Syracuse) for many years and, as an officer in the Epworth League, planned many social functions for the young people of the church and university.

== Career ==
In 1913, she relocated to Washington, D.C., where, from 1913 to 1920, she was an editor and librarian in the U.S. Department of Agriculture and her husband's assistant in economic studies for a period of time. As national secretary of Alpha Chi Omega beginning in 1915 and as editor of The Lyre for six years, there were thousands who knew her throughout the world.

She was very active in the American Association of University Women, a Washington, D.C.-based organization.

She was also a member of Foundry United Methodist Church in Washington, D.C., where she taught a Sunday School class.

== Personal life ==
Marshall was a member of the Methodist Episcopal Church. In 1923, she married Herbert Camp Marshall, an economist and lawyer. They had one daughter, Eleanor.

== Death and legacy ==
On July 25, 1925, Marshall died suddenly following an operation she had following a week of illness.

At the sorority's 1926 National Convention, a graduate fellowship was established to her memory.
