= William W. Porter =

American lawyer

William Wagener Porter (May 5, 1856 – November 16, 1928) was an American attorney and legal author. He was a graduate of the University of Pennsylvania in the class of 1875 and admitted to the Philadelphia Bar in 1877. He served as associate justice of the Superior Court of Pennsylvania from 1897 to 1903.

Porter was instrumental in founding the Society of the Descendants of the Schwenkfeldian Exiles, and belonged to the Society of the Cincinnati, the Sons of the Revolution, the Merion Cricket Club, and the Presbyterian Social Union. He served as vice president of the Union League of Philadelphia.

He died in 1928 and is buried at Laurel Hill Cemetery in Philadelphia.

== Works ==
- The Legal Responsibilities of Clergymen Who Solemnize Marriages in Pennsylvania (Philadelphia: Kay and Brothers, 1885)
- A Treatise on the Law of Bills of Lading (Philadelphia: Kay and Brothers, 1891)
- Girard the Citizen: An Address (1904)
- Professional Compensation: The Right and Its Enforcement
- The Present Status of the Legal Profession (1907)
- Address delivered by the Honorable William Wagener Porter at a Meeting of the Society of the Schwenkfeldian Exiles October Eighth, 1921.
- A Consideration of Some of the Opportunities and Obligations of the Lawyer of To-day: An Address (undated)
