= Justin Simmons (politician) =

American politician

Justin J. Simmons
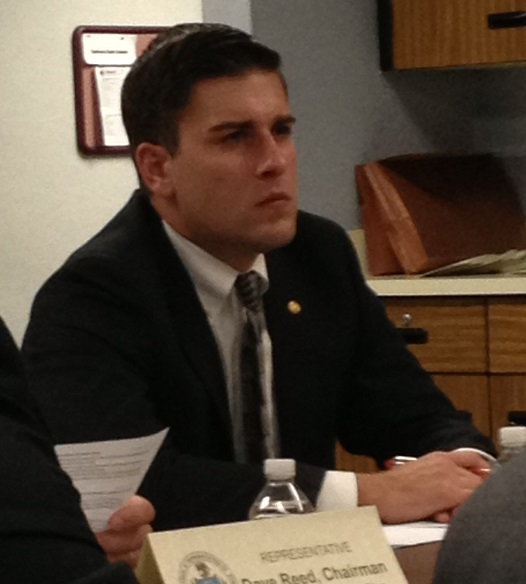

Member of the Pennsylvania House of Representatives from the 131st district
- In office January 4, 2011 – January 5, 2021
- Preceded by: Karen Beyer
- Succeeded by: Milou Mackenzie

Personal details
- Born: Pennsylvania
- Party: Republican
- Education: Saint Joseph’s University
- Occupation: Legislator

Justin Simmons is a former politician associated with the Republican Party who served five terms in the Pennsylvania House of Representatives, representing the 131st District.

== Political career ==
Simmons was first elected to the Pennsylvania State House in November 2010, defeating incumbent Republican Karen Beyer in the May 2010 primary.

As State Representative, he stated that he favors selling the state liquor stores and reducing the size of the state legislature. He also said he supports term limits, part-time status for members of the General Assembly and operating on a two-year budget cycle. Simmons promised to refuse per diems, a state-owned vehicle, and a pension.

In 2017, Simmons briefly ran for the U.S. House of Representatives in the 2018 election, for the seat held by Rep. Charlie Dent. He withdrew from the race after two months, after The Morning Call reported that he had missed a large number of votes as a state representative.

In 2019, he announced that he would not seek re-election to his State House seat in 2020.
