= Upper Perkiomen School District =

School district in Pennsylvania, United States

Coordinates: 40.39653°N 75.48615°W

Address
- 2229 East Buck Road Pennsburg, Pennsylvania, 18073; United States

District information
- Type: Public
- Schools: 5
- Budget: $91.4 million
- NCES District ID: 4224540

Students and staff
- Students: 3,198 (2022–23)
- Teachers: 220.0 (FTE)
- Student–teacher ratio: 14.54
- District mascot: Indian
- Colors: Blue & Gold

Other information
- Website: https://www.upsd.org/

Upper Perkiomen School District is located in the northern corner of Montgomery County and the eastern corner of Berks County in the US state of Pennsylvania.

The district comprises the townships of Upper Hanover and Marlborough and the boroughs of East Greenville, Green Lane, Pennsburg, and Red Hill in Montgomery County and Hereford Township in Berks County.

The district maintains five schools in total; Upper Perkiomen High School, for grades 9 through 12; Upper Perkiomen Middle School, for grades 6 through 8; Upper Perkiomen 4th & 5th Grade Center, for grades 4 and 5; and two elementary schools, Marlborough and Hereford, for students in kindergarten through grade 3.

As of the 2022-23 school year, the district had 3,198 students and 220 teachers on an FTE basis for a teacher-student ratio of 14.54, according to the National Center for Education Statistics.

== Schools ==
- Hereford Elementary School (K–3)
- Marlborough Elementary School (K–3)
- Upper Perkiomen 4th and 5th Grade Center (4–5)
- Upper Perkiomen Middle School (6–8)
- Upper Perkiomen High School (9–12)
