= Karen D. Beyer =

American politician (born 1962)

Member of the Pennsylvania House of Representatives from the 131st district
- In office July 19, 2005 – November 30, 2010
- Preceded by: Pat Browne
- Succeeded by: Justin Simmons

Personal details
- Born: June 15, 1962 (age 64) Jeannette, Pennsylvania, U.S.
- Party: Republican
- Spouse: Merrill Beyer
- Education: College of William & Mary

Military service
- Branch/service: United States Air Force

Karen D. Beyer (born June 15, 1962) is a U.S. Republican politician and former member of the Pennsylvania House of Representatives 131st District. She was elected in a special election on July 19, 2005.

Beyer is a graduate of the College of William and Mary in Williamsburg, Virginia and U.S. Air Force veteran.

Beyer lives in Lower Saucon Township, with her husband, a pilot with United Airlines and retired Air Force lieutenant colonel, and their three children.
