= Schwenkfelder Library & Heritage Center =

Coordinates: 40.4003°N 75.5058°W

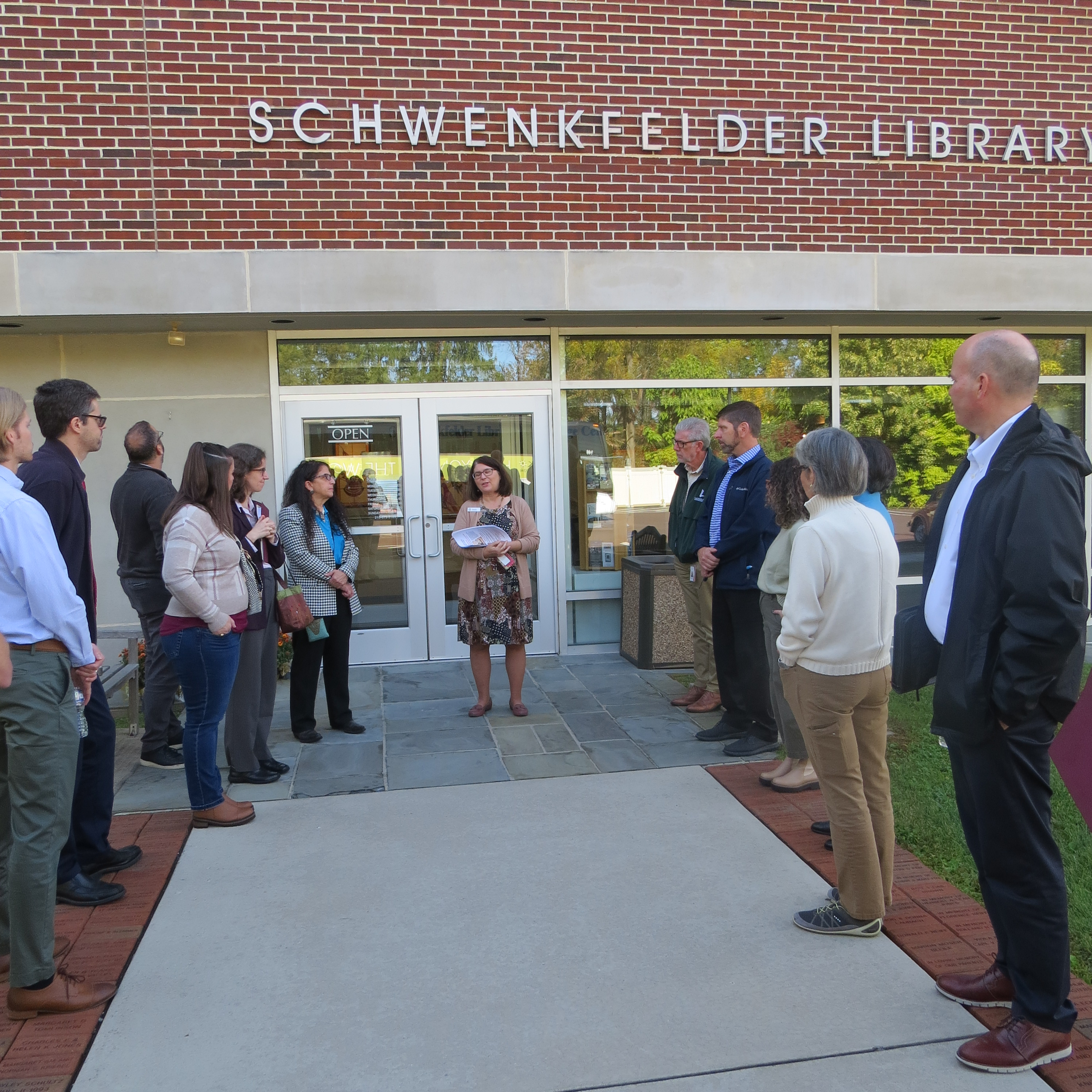
- A tour group stands in front of the library.
- Location: 105 Seminary Street, Pennsburg, Pennsylvania, United States of America, 18073
- Established: Established as an independent institution 1947; 79 years ago

Other information
- Director: Beth A. Twiss Houting

The Schwenkfelder Library & Heritage Center is a not-for-profit historical library, archive, and museum located in Pennsburg, Pennsylvania. Its mission is to "protect, preserve and interpret books, manuscripts and artifacts of the Schwenkfelders and the people of southeastern Pennsylvania in general and the Perkiomen Valley in particular."

== History ==
The Heritage Center's collection began as an informal collection in a private home in Hereford Township, Pennsylvania. In 1890 it was designated the "Schwenkfelder Historical Library." Two years later the collection was moved to the Perkiomen Seminary (now The Perkiomen School) in Pennsburg, PA. The initial collection was part of an effort to gather the writings of the spiritualist reformer Kaspar Schwenkfeld von Ossig (1489–1561). The Carnegie library, on the campus of The Perkiomen School, was designated to house on the upper floor the growing collection of books, manuscripts, and artifacts related to Schwenkfelder history. In 1947 the Schwenkfelder Library was established as a non-profit educational institution separate from Perkiomen Seminary. In 1951 the book and manuscript collection were moved to a new building adjacent to the Perkiomen School.

In 2001, the Schwenkfelder Historical Library was expanded to house the library, archive, and museum collections. Andrew S. Berky served as the first full-time director of the Schwenkfelder Library from 1951 to 1973. Peter C. Erb succeeded Berky in 1973 as Associate Director, officially fulfilling this role until 1983. Dennis K. Moyer became the director in 1983 and served in this capacity until 1997 when David W. Luz, the current director, took over the position.

Vernon Seipt, a Schwenkfelder descendant and board member of the Heritage Center, donated his family's barn to the Schwenkfelder Library and Heritage Center. The barn was originally built in the 1820s and was relocated and restored from 2018–2020 by Quarry View Building Group. With a background in Amish barn building techniques, the team at Quarry View Building Group deconstructed the barn, labeled and transported the pieces, and then rebuilt the barn at the Schwenkfelder Library and Heritage Center. The Schwenkfelder Library & Heritage Center received an award for the barn addition from the Montgomery County Planning Commission Awards program for the preservation of community heritage, context-sensitive design, and a successful long-term planning process.

== Collections ==
The Schwenkfelder Library & Heritage Center collection was formally started in 1885. The initial collection was an effort to gather the writings of Protestant reformer Caspar Schwenckfeld von Ossig (1489–1561). This collection of writings resulted in the Corpus Schwenckfeldianorum (1907–1961), a nineteen-volume body of work containing Schwenckfeld's letters and books. The collection expanded after 1913, after it was housed in the Carnegie Library, part of Perkiomen Seminary. In 1919 twelve tons of research material was shipped from Germany, largely due to the collecting efforts and research of Dr. Elmer ES Johnson. Although most of the collection was acquired through personal donations, the Schwenkfelder Library purchased a portion of the extensive collection of Pennsylvania Governor Samuel W. Pennypacker in the 1920s.

The diverse collection of objects and archival materials today focus on Schwenkfelder heritage as well as the Goshenhoppen and Perkiomen Valley regions of Pennsylvania, and is known for its collection of Schwenkfelder fraktur. The museum collection houses artifacts and objects related to Caspar Schwenckfeld von Ossig, Schwenkfelder immigration, and the Schwenkfelder way of life in southeastern Pennsylvania. The collection includes furniture, household art, folk art paintings and drawings, agricultural equipment, quilts, show towels, coverlets and other textiles as well as an herbarium.

The widely known Schwenkfelder Fraktur collection at the Schwenkfelder Library includes bookplates, Vorshriften, religious texts, Labyrinths, certificates and manuscript books.

In addition to the Corpus project, the library and archive collection includes, but is not limited to, local church and cemetery records, German and English newspapers, deeds and land draughts, family genealogies, the H. Winslow Fegley photograph collection, and Pennsylvania German prints and manuscripts.

== See also ==
- Kaspar Schwenkfeld von Ossig
- Schwenkfelder Church
