= James Ritter =

American draftsman and politician (1930–2015)

James P. Ritter

Member of the Pennsylvania House of Representatives from the 131st district
- In office 1969–1982
- Preceded by: District Created
- Succeeded by: Roy Afflerbach

Member of the Pennsylvania House of Representatives from the Lehigh County district
- In office 1965–1968

Personal details
- Born: October 30, 1930 Allentown, Pennsylvania, U.S.
- Died: May 4, 2015 (aged 84) Allentown, Pennsylvania, U.S.
- Party: Democratic

James P. Ritter (October 30, 1930 – May 4, 2015) was an American design draftsman and politician.

== Formative years ==
Ritter was born October 30, 1930, in Allentown, Pennsylvania. He graduated from Allentown High School and served in the U.S. Army during the Korean War. Ritter took courses in mechanical engineering.

== Career ==
A design draftsman for PPL Corporation and Lehigh Structural Steel in Allentown, Ritter served in the Pennsylvania House of Representatives from 1965 until 1983 and was a Democrat.

== Death ==
Ritter died in Allentown, Pennsylvania, on May 4, 2015.
