= Roy Afflerbach =

American politician (born 1945)

Roy C. Afflerbach
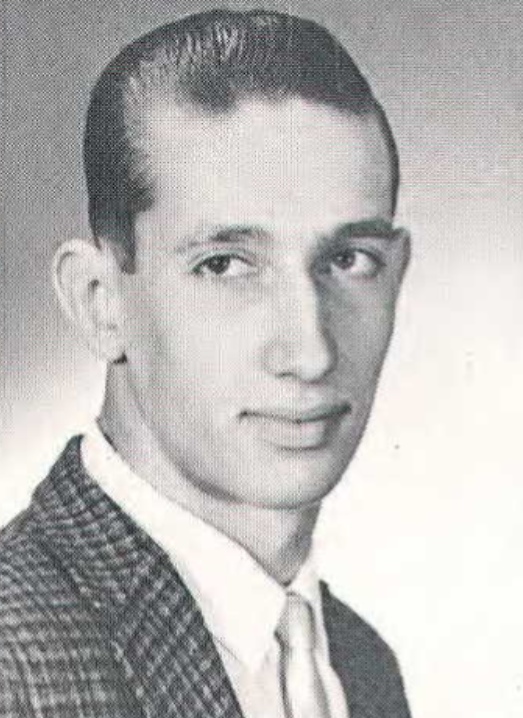
- Afflerbach in 1963

35th Mayor of Allentown, Pennsylvania
- In office January 7, 2002 – January 3, 2006
- Preceded by: William L. Heydt
- Succeeded by: Ed Pawlowski

Member of the Pennsylvania Senate from the 16th district
- In office January 6, 1987 – November 30, 1998
- Preceded by: Guy Kratzer
- Succeeded by: Charlie Dent

Member of the Pennsylvania House of Representatives from the 131st district
- In office January 4, 1983 – November 30, 1986
- Preceded by: James Ritter
- Succeeded by: Karen Ritter

Personal details
- Born: February 6, 1945 (age 81) Allentown, Pennsylvania, U.S.
- Party: Democratic
- Education: Kutztown University of Pennsylvania

Roy C. Afflerbach (born February 6, 1945) is an American lobbyist and former Pennsylvania State Senator and Representative. He was mayor of Allentown, Pennsylvania, the third largest city in Pennsylvania, from 2002 to 2006. In December 2004, after a difficult year, Afflerbach announced that he would not run for another term.

== Early life and education ==
Afflerbach was born on February 6, 1945, in Allentown, Pennsylvania. He attended and graduated from Emmaus High School in Emmaus, Pennsylvania, and served in the United States Air Force from 1963 through 1967. Afflerbach earned his BA from Kutztown University of Pennsylvania in 1972 and his MA in 1989.

== Career ==
=== Pennsylvania State House and Senate ===
Afflerbach is a Democrat and began his political career as a State Representative for the 131st district, a position he held from 1983 through 1986. He later served as a State Senator for the 16th district from 1987 through 1998.

=== Allentown mayor ===
Afflerbach served as mayor of Allentown, Pennsylvania, from 2002 through 2006. His final year in office was mired in difficulty dealing with Allentown's city council. Some former supporters asked for Afflerbach's resignation, and he was blamed for nearly bungling a deal to bring a Minor League Baseball park to Allentown. He was also accused of making poorly timed inflammatory remarks.

=== Lobbyist ===
After leaving office, Afflerbach started the Afflerbach Group, an Allentown-based lobbying firm. Among its causes is lobbying for an end to animal cruelty in Pennsylvania through factory farming practices known as "common farming exemptions." In late 2007, Afflerbach spoke at a fundraiser sponsored by Hugs for Puppies, a group pushing to ban the sale of foie gras in Philadelphia.
