= Red Hill Historic District =

Historic district in Pennsylvania, United States

- U.S. National Register of Historic Places
- U.S. Historic district
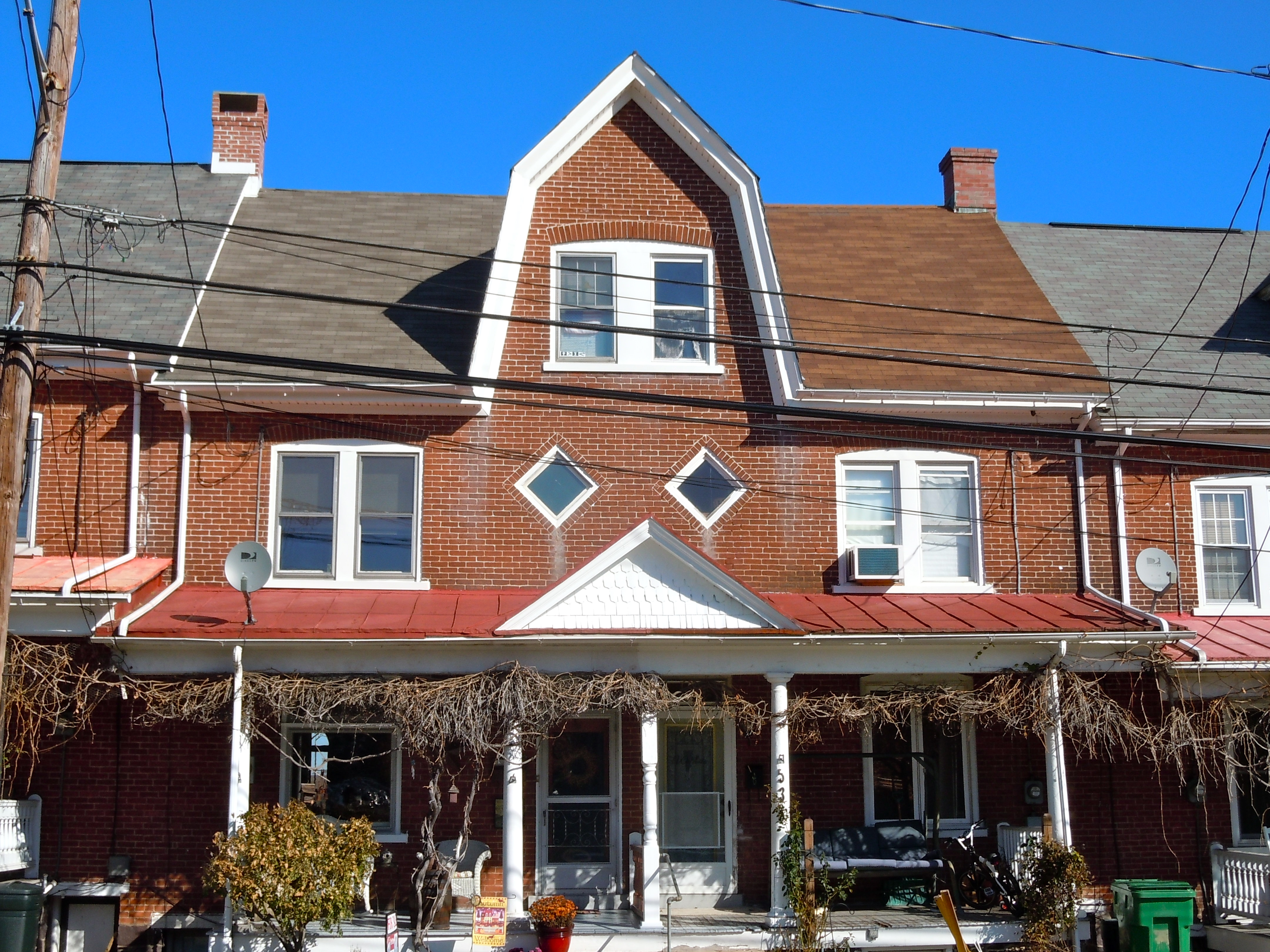
- House in the Red Hill Historic District, November 2011

- Location within Pennsylvania Location within the United States
- Location: 148, 152, and 200-600 Main St., 98-226 and 21-231 W. Sixth St., and 532-550 Adams St., Red Hill, Pennsylvania
- Coordinates: 40°22′33″N 75°29′02″W
- Area: 55 acres (22 ha)
- Architectural style: Gothic, Queen Anne
- NRHP reference No.: 85003428
- Added to NRHP: October 31, 1985

The Red Hill Historic District is a national historic district that is located in Red Hill, Montgomery County, Pennsylvania.

It was added to the National Register of Historic Places in 1985.

== History and architectural features ==
This district encompasses 163 contributing buildings that are located in the working-class borough of Red Hill. The district includes a number of brick workers' houses, nineteenth-century Gothic-style cottages, Queen Anne-style rowhouses, and twentieth century bungalows.

Notable buildings include the S.C. Moyer Cigar factory (c. 1880), the Red Hill Hotel (1811), a firehouse (1924), the Miller and Kline cigar factory, and the Hillegass House.
