= Upper Perkiomen High School =

Coordinates: 40.38094°N 75.48989°W

- 2 Walt Rd; Pennsburg, Pennsylvania 18073; United States

Information
- Type: Public
- School district: Upper Perkiomen School District
- NCES School ID: 422454005081
- Principal: Frank Flanagan
- Faculty: 63.05 (FTE)
- Grades: 9–12
- Enrollment: 1,021 (2024–25)
- Student to teacher ratio: 16.19
- Colors: Blue and gold
- Website: uphs.upsd.org

Upper Perkiomen High School is a public high school in Red Hill in Montgomery County, Pennsylvania, United States, with a Pennsburg post office address. It is part of the Upper Perkiomen School District.

As of the 2024-25 school year, Upper Perkiomen High School had 1,021 students and 63.05 teachers for a student-teacher ratio of 16.19, according to National Center for Education Statistics data.

Tim Mayza, graduated in 2010, signed with the Philadelphia Phillies in April 2026.
