= Pennsburg, Pennsylvania =

Borough in Pennsylvania, US

Borough of Pennsburg
- Borough
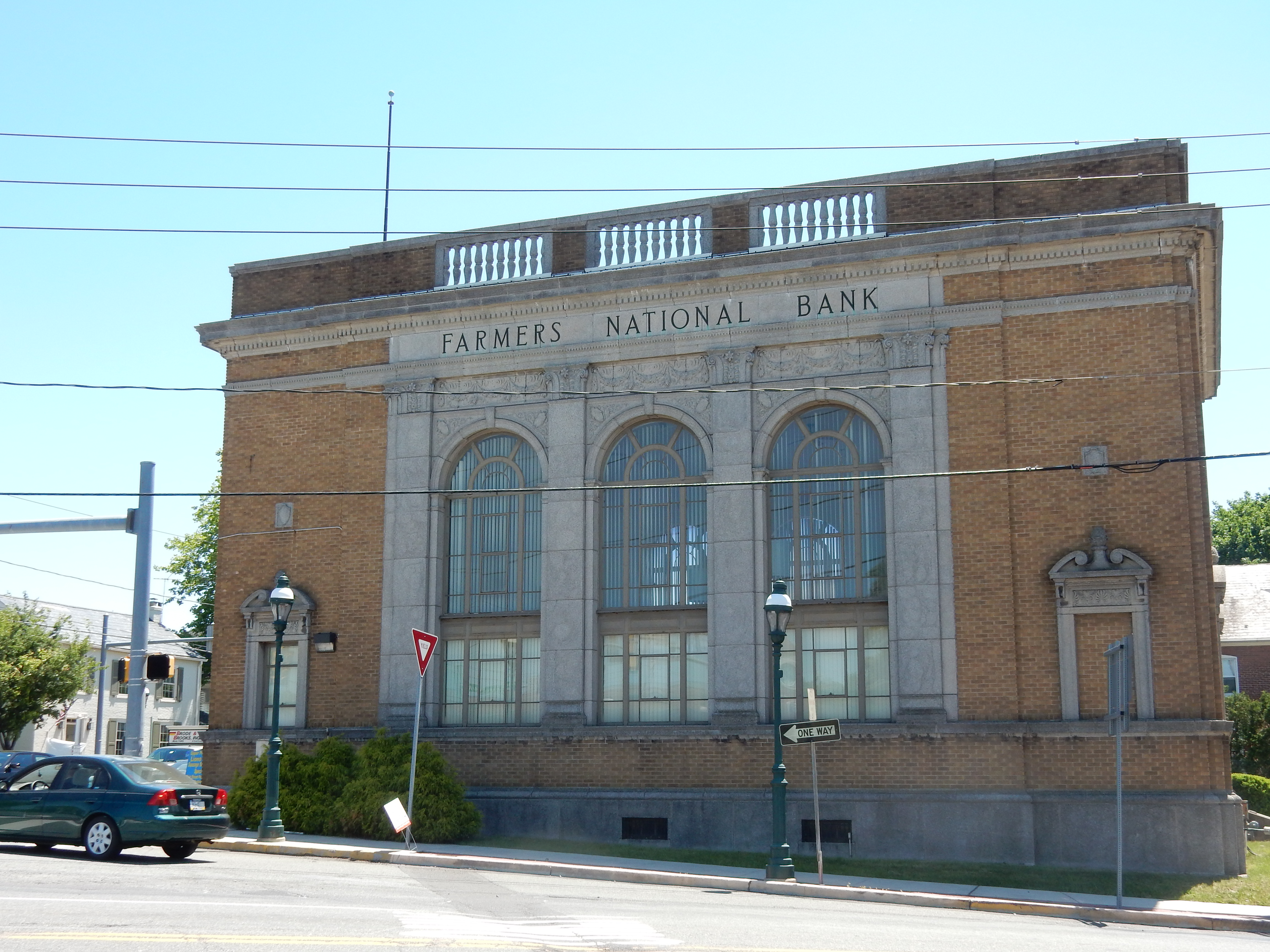
- Farmers National Bank Building, built in 1926 in Pennsburg, in May 2015

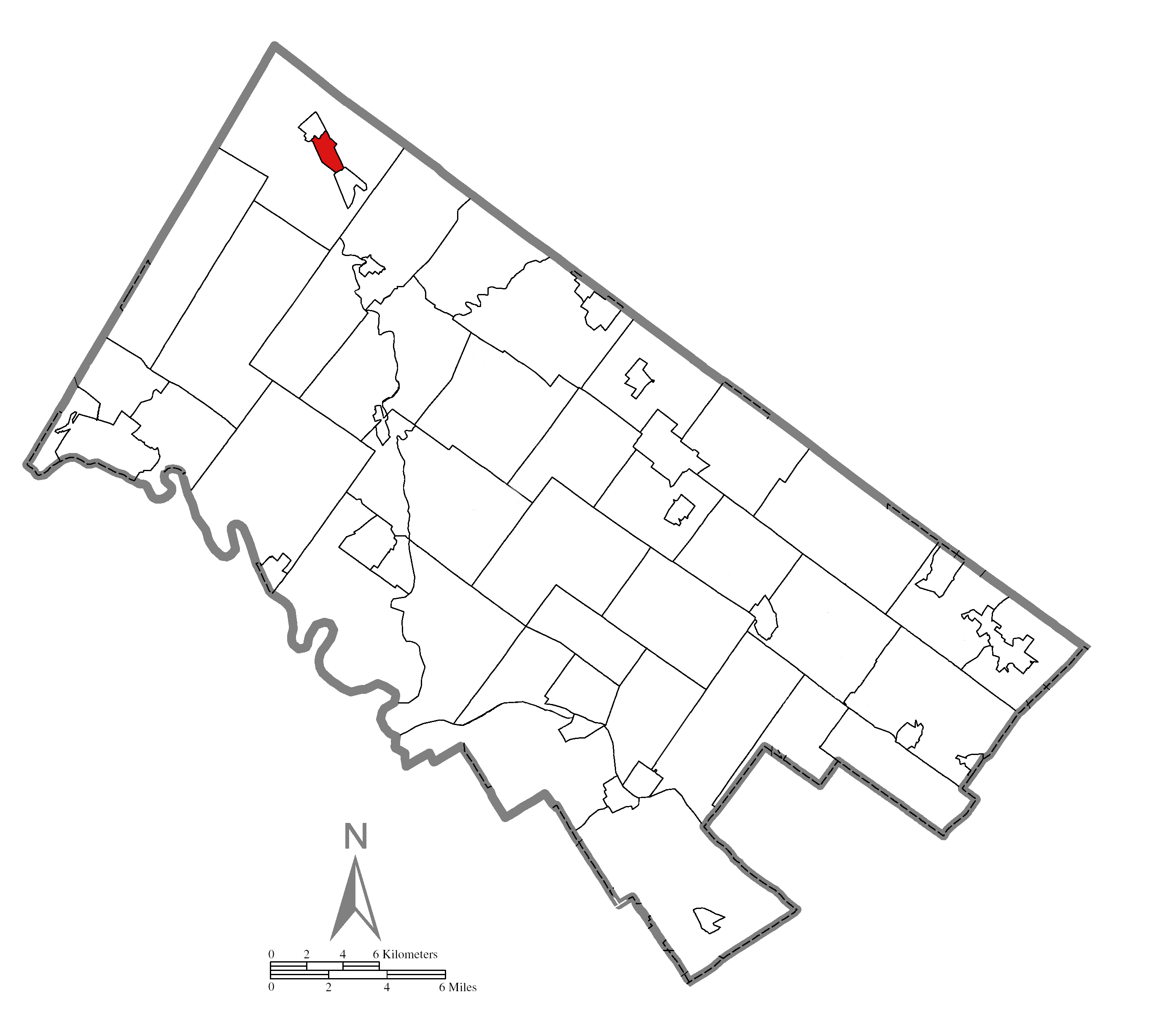
- Location of Pennsburg in Montgomery County, Pennsylvania

- Location of Pennsburg in Pennsylvania Pennsburg (the United States)
- Coordinates: 40°23′44″N 75°29′50″W
- Country: United States
- State: Pennsylvania
- County: Montgomery
- Incorporated: April 9, 1888

Government
  - Type: Council-manager
  - Mayor: Charles Shagg

Area
  - Total: 0.80 sq mi (2.07 km^{2})
  - Land: 0.80 sq mi (2.07 km^{2})
  - Water: 0 sq mi (0.00 km^{2})
- Elevation: 381 ft (116 m)

Population (2020)
  - Total: 3,889
  - Density: 4,859.4/sq mi (1,876.24/km^{2})
- Time zone: UTC-5 (EST)
  - Summer (DST): UTC-4 (EDT)
- ZIP Code: 18073
- Area codes: 215, 267, and 445
- FIPS code: 42-59120
- School district: Upper Perkiomen School District
- Website: http://www.pennsburg.us

Pennsburg is a borough in Montgomery County, Pennsylvania, United States. Its population was 3,889 at the 2020 census. It is part of the Upper Perkiomen School District. It is also part of the strip of small towns that run together along Route 29: Red Hill, Pennsburg, and East Greenville. The towns are collectively referred to as Upper Perk.

== Geography ==
Pennsburg is located at 40°23′44″N 75°29′50″W (40.395595, −75.497361). According to the U.S. Census Bureau, the borough has a total area of 0.8 square miles (2.1 km^{2}), all land. Pennsburg is located 40 mi (64 km) northwest of Philadelphia and 5 mi (8.0 km) southwest of Quakertown. Pennsburg's elevation is at 350 ft (110 m) above sea level. A nature preserve is along Macoby Creek.

The borough has a hot-summer, humid continental climate (Dfa) and average monthly temperatures range from 29.9 °F in January to 74.6 °F in July. The USDA hardiness zone is 7a.

== Demographics ==
Historical population
Census	Pop.	Note	%±
1890	627		—
1900	1,032		64.6%
1910	1,141		10.6%
1920	1,404		23.0%
1930	1,494		6.4%
1940	1,543		3.3%
1950	1,625		5.3%
1960	1,698		4.5%
1970	2,260		33.1%
1980	2,339		3.5%
1990	2,460		5.2%
2000	2,732		11.1%
2010	3,843		40.7%
2020	3,889		1.2%

=== 2020 census ===
As of the 2020 census, Pennsburg had a population of 3,889.

The median age was 33.4 years. 25.4% of residents were under the age of 18 and 12.2% of residents were 65 years of age or older. For every 100 females there were 101.5 males, and for every 100 females age 18 and over there were 98.4 males age 18 and over.

100.0% of residents lived in urban areas, while 0.0% lived in rural areas.

There were 1,289 households in Pennsburg, of which 34.7% had children under the age of 18 living in them. Of all households, 47.2% were married-couple households, 19.9% were households with a male householder and no spouse or partner present, and 22.3% were households with a female householder and no spouse or partner present. About 25.1% of all households were made up of individuals and 8.5% had someone living alone who was 65 years of age or older.

There were 1,352 housing units, of which 4.7% were vacant. The homeowner vacancy rate was 1.6% and the rental vacancy rate was 4.3%.

Racial composition as of the 2020 census
Race	Number	Percent
White	3,255	83.7%
Black or African American	159	4.1%
American Indian and Alaska Native	5	0.1%
Asian	193	5.0%
Native Hawaiian and Other Pacific Islander	4	0.1%
Some other race	56	1.4%
Two or more races	217	5.6%
Hispanic or Latino (of any race)	206	5.3%

=== 2010 census ===
As of the 2010 census, the borough was 90.0% White, 2.0% Black or African American, 0.1% Native American, 5.2% Asian, 0.1% Native Hawaiian, and 1.4% of two or more races. About 4.1% of the population were of Hispanic or Latino ancestry.

=== 2000 census ===
As of the 2000 census, 2,732 people, 1,009 households, and 705 families resided in the borough. The population density was 3,567.8 inhabitants per square mile (1,377.5/km^{2}). The 1,078 housing units averaged 1,407.8 per square mile (540.5/km^{2}). The racial makeup of the borough was 97.36% White, 0.81% African American, 0.07% Native American, 0.48% Asian, 0.55% from other races, and 0.73% from two or more races. Hispanics or Latinos of any race were 1.61% of the population.

Of the 1,009 households, 38.1% had children under the age of 18 living with them, 55.2% were married couples living together, 9.8% had a female householder with no husband present, and 30.1% were not families. About 24.0% of all households were made up of individuals, and 8.5% had someone living alone who was 65 years of age or older. The average household size was 2.59 and the average family size was 3.08.

In the borough, the population was age distributed as 27.0% under the age of 18, 7.4% from 18 to 24, 33.1% from 25 to 44, 18.4% from 45 to 64, and 14.1% who were 65 years of age or older. The median age was 35 years. For every 100 females, there were 90.4 males. For every 100 females age 18 and over, there were 90.9 males.

The median income for a household in the borough was $46,715, and for a family was $56,250. Males had a median income of $37,036 versus $26,190 for females. The per capita income for the borough was $18,977. About 4.4% of families and 6.2% of the population were below the poverty line, including 6.3% of those under age 18 and 3.7% of those age 65 or over.

== Transportation ==
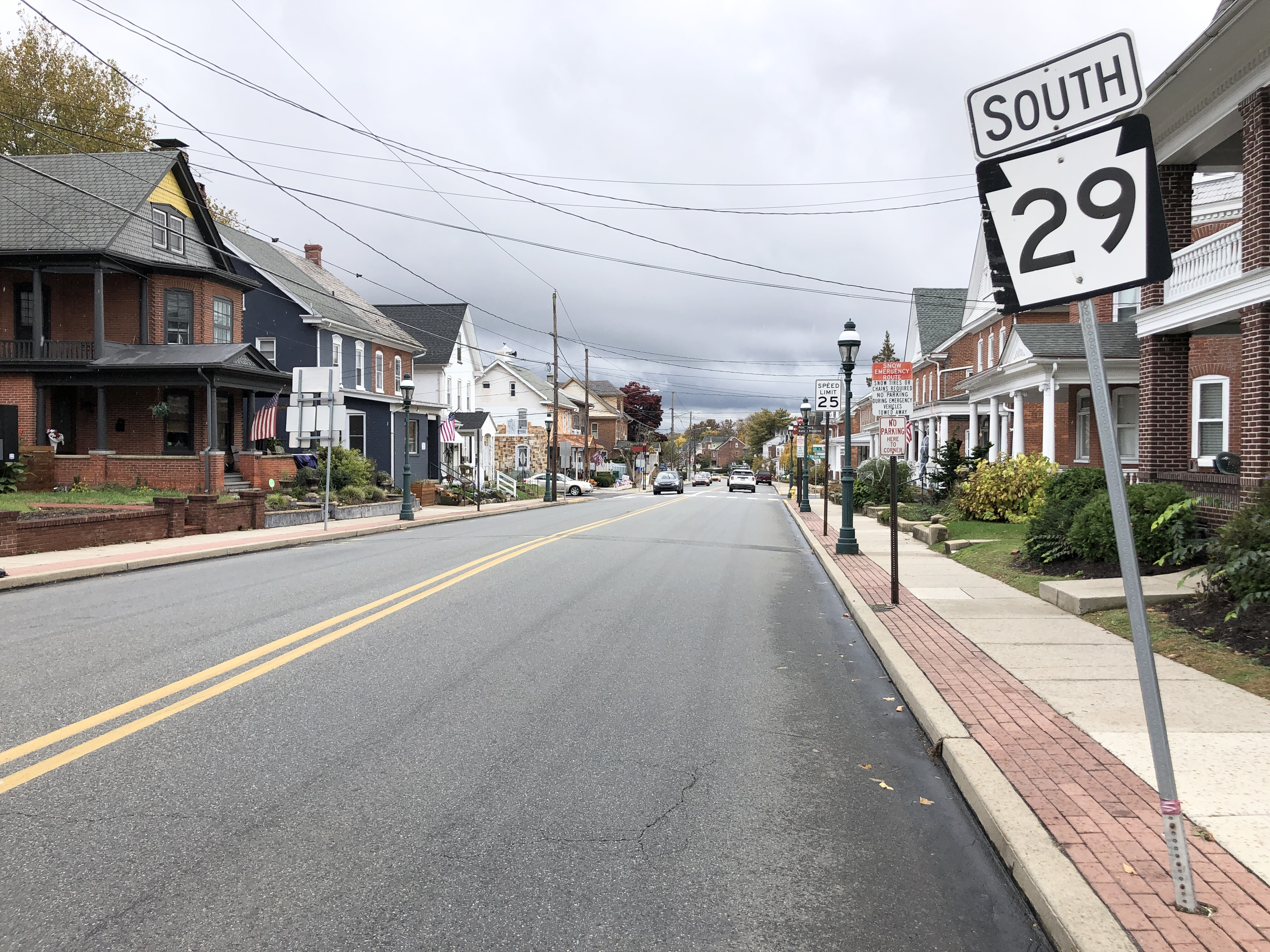
PA Route 29 South in Pennsburg

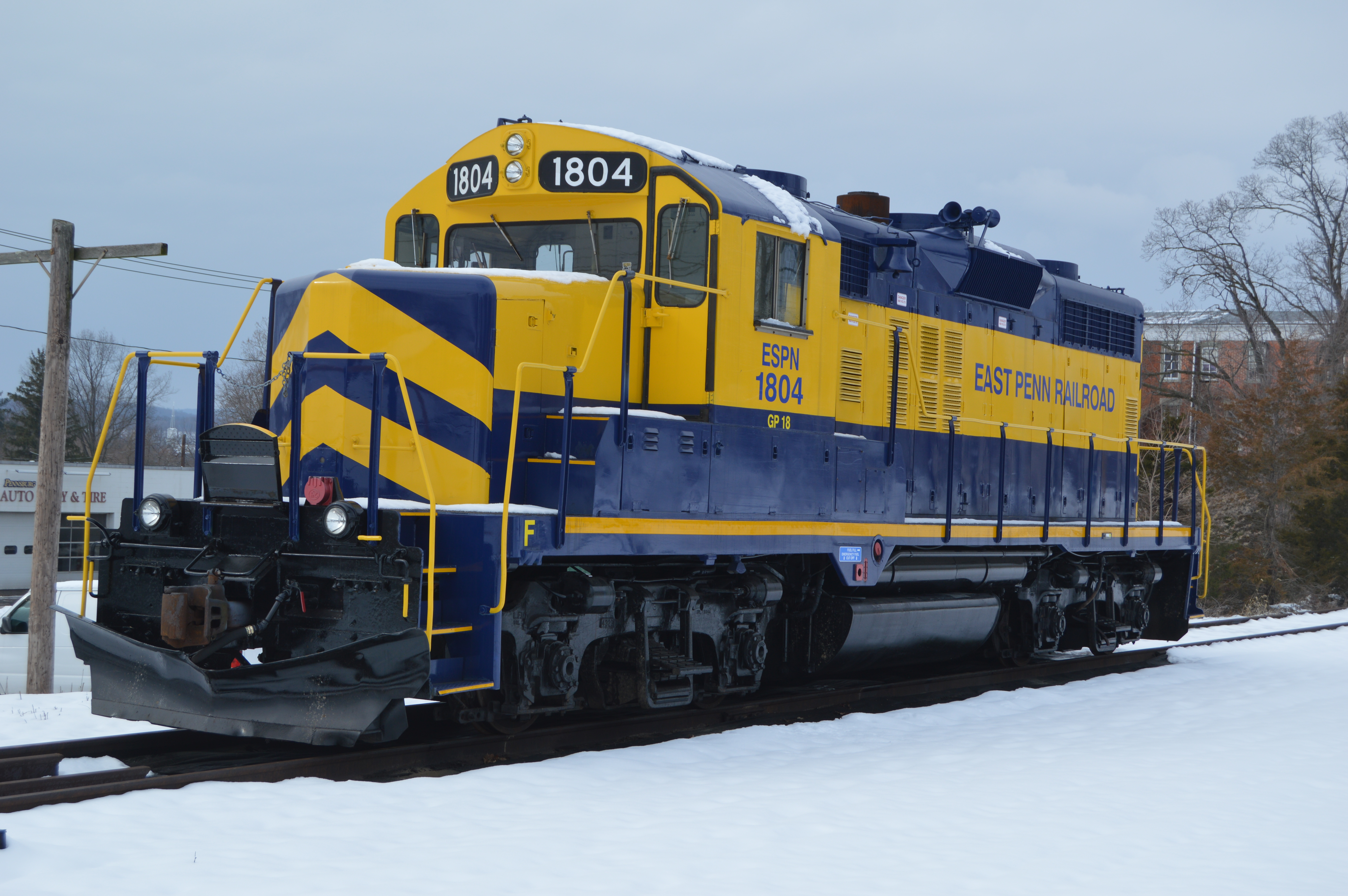
An East Penn Railroad locomotive in Pennsburg in April 2014

As of 2014 there were 10.05 miles (16.17 km) of public roads in Pennsburg, of which 2.56 miles (4.12 km) were maintained by the Pennsylvania Department of Transportation (PennDOT) and 7.77 miles (12.50 km) were maintained by the borough.

Pennsburg lies at the junction of Pennsylvania Route 29 and Pennsylvania Route 663. PA 29 follows Main Street on a northwest-to-southeast alignment through town, while PA 663 follows Pottstown Avenue and Quakertown Avenue on a northeast-to-southwest alignment.

== Politics and government ==
Pennsburg has a city manager form of government with a mayor and borough council. The borough is part of the Pennsylvania's 4th Congressional District (represented by Rep. Madeleine Dean), Pennsylvania's 131st Representative District (represented by Rep. Milou Mackenzie), and Pennsylvania Senate, District 24 (represented by Sen. Tracy Pennycuick).

Presidential elections results
Year	Republican	Democratic
2020	54.0% 932	44.6% 770
2016	50.3% 739	42.6% 625
2012	47.7% 594	50.5% 629
2008	40.4% 554	58.1% 796
2004	47.1% 566	52.6% 632
2000	48.4% 380	47.0% 369

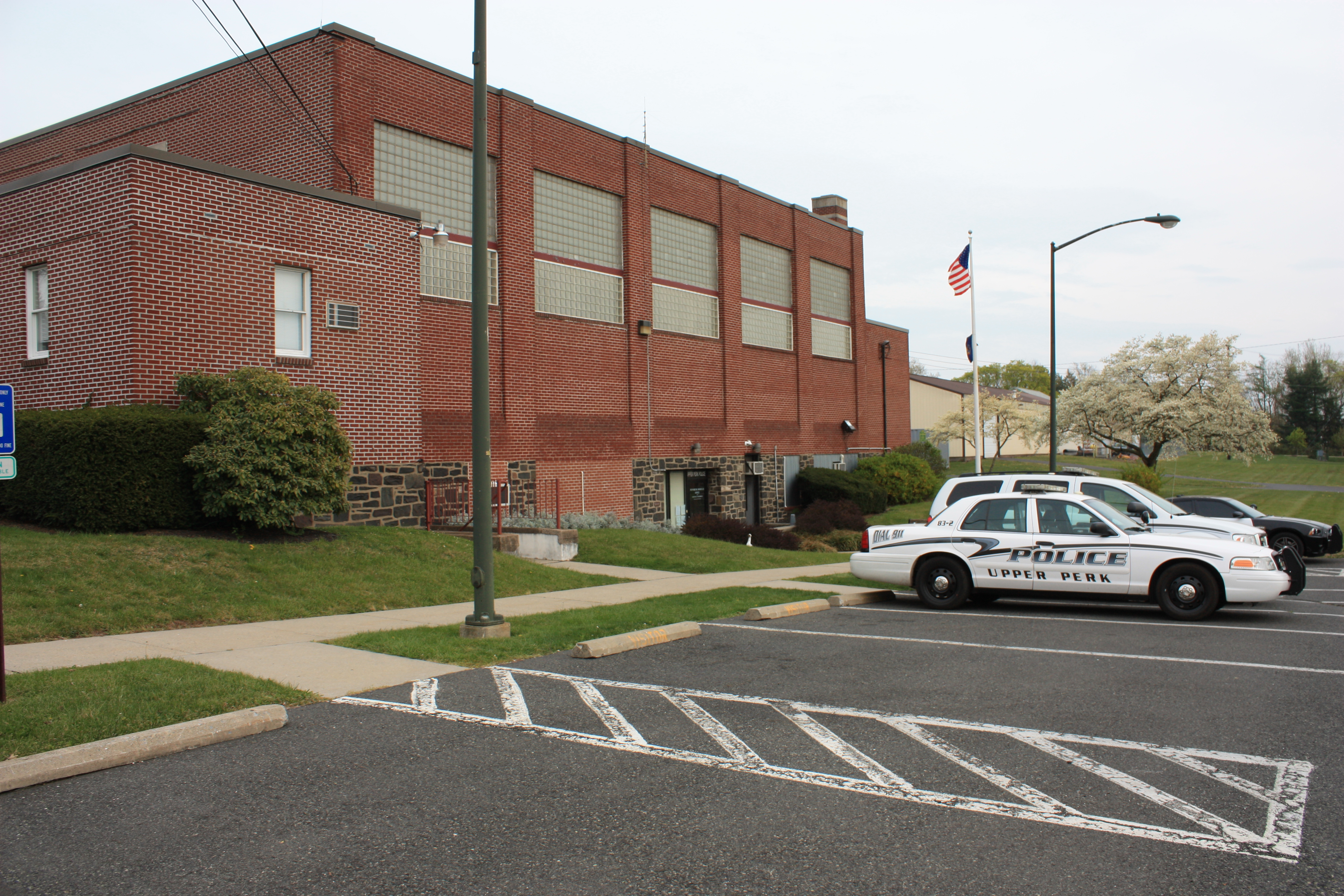
Pennsburg Borough Hall

== Education ==
Pennsburg is part of the Upper Perkiomen School District. Students in grades 9 through 12 attend Upper Perkiomen High School.

Perkiomen School, a private secondary school, is in Pennsburg.

== Notable people ==
- Mary Emma Griffith Marshall, former editor and librarian
