= Milou Mackenzie =

American politician

V. Milou Mackenzie

Member of the Pennsylvania House of Representatives from the 131st district
- Incumbent
- Assumed office January 5, 2021
- Preceded by: Justin Simmons

Personal details
- Party: Republican
- Education: Cedar Crest College (BA)
- Website: Official website

Victoria Milou Mackenzie is an American politician. She is a Republican member of the Pennsylvania House of Representatives, and has represented the 131st district since 2021.

She is the mother of Ryan Mackenzie, a representative for Pennsylvania's 7th congressional district in the United States House of Representatives. Prior to Ryan Mackenzie's election to his current role, they were the first mother-son pair to simultaneously serve in the Pennsylvania House of Representatives.

== Biography ==
Mackenzie graduated from Nazareth High School in 1968 and received a BA in English from Cedar Crest College in 1972.

In 2020, Mackenzie was elected to the Pennsylvania House of Representatives, representing the 131st District, which includes parts of Northampton County, Lehigh County, and Montgomery County. She defeated Democratic candidate Kevin Branco with 54.3% of the vote in the general election.
