= Pennsylvania House of Representatives, District 132 =

American legislative district

Pennsylvania's 132nd State House of Representatives district
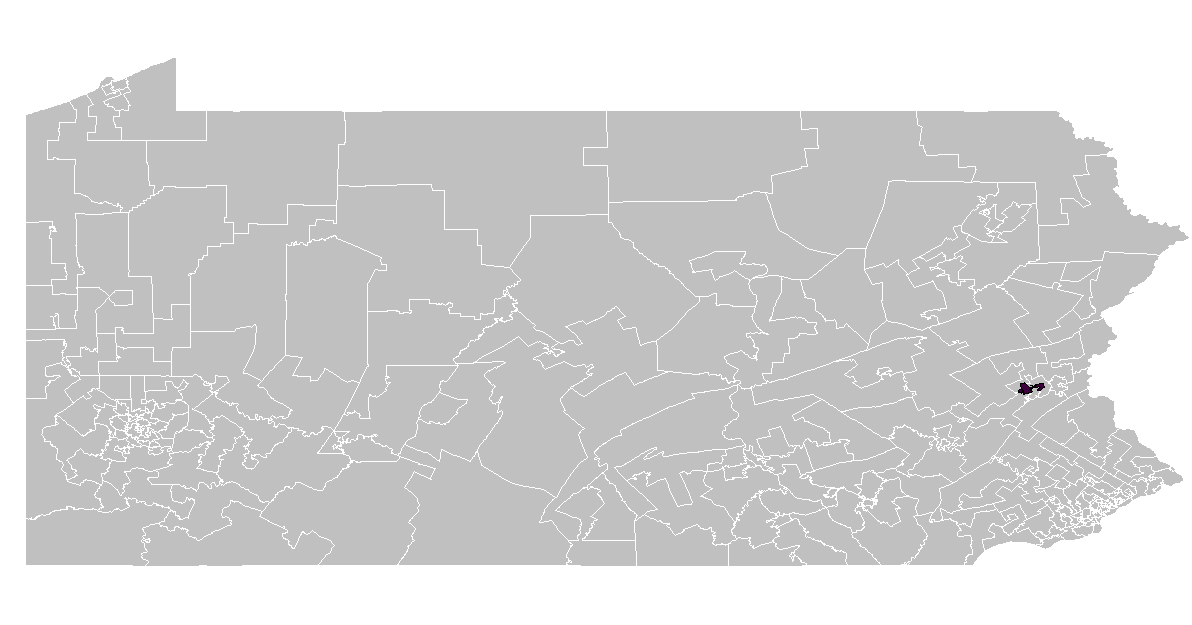
Representative
Michael Schlossberg; D–Allentown
- Demographics: 68.0% White; 9.4% Black; 31.8% Hispanic
- Population (2011) • Citizens of voting age: 62,145; 47,681

The 132nd Pennsylvania House of Representatives District is located in eastern Pennsylvania and has been represented since 2013 by Michael Schlossberg.

== District profile ==
The 132nd Pennsylvania House of Representatives District is located in Lehigh County. It includes Dorney Park. It is made up of the following areas:

- Allentown (PART)
  - Ward 08 [PART, Divisions 04 and 07]
  - Ward 11 [PART, Divisions 04, 05, 06, and 07]
  - Ward 13 [PART, Division 04]
  - Ward 17
  - Ward 18
- South Whitehall Township
- Upper Macungie Township (part)
  - District 01
  - District 02
  - District 04
  - District 05
  - District 06

== Representatives ==
Representative	Party	Years	District home	Note
Prior to 1969, seats were apportioned by county.
Samuel W. Frank	Democrat	1969 – 1973		Died on April 17, 1973
Kurt D. Zwickl	Democrat	1973 – 1984		Elected to fill vacancy on November 15, 1973
John F. Pressman	Democrat	1985 – 1990		
Charlie Dent	Republican	1991 – 1998	Allentown	Elected to the Pennsylvania State Senate
Jennifer L. Mann	Democrat	1999 – 2012	Allentown	Retired
Michael Schlossberg	Democrat	2013 – present	Allentown	

== Recent election results ==
PA House election, 2010: Pennsylvania House, District 132
Party	Candidate	Votes	%	±%
Democratic	Jennifer L. Mann	9,164	100	
Margin of victory		9,164		
Turnout		9,164	100	

PA House election, 2012: Pennsylvania House, District 132
Party	Candidate	Votes	%	±%
Democratic	Michael Schlossberg	17,013	100	
Margin of victory		17,013		
Turnout		17,013	100	

PA House election, 2014: Pennsylvania House, District 132
Party	Candidate	Votes	%	±%
Democratic	Michael Schlossberg	7,899	100	
Margin of victory		7,899		
Turnout		7,899	100	

PA House election, 2016: Pennsylvania House, District 132
Party	Candidate	Votes	%	±%
Democratic	Michael Schlossberg	16,065	67.13	
Republican	Benjamin B. Long	7,866	32.87	
Margin of victory		8,199	34.26	▼65.74
Turnout		23,931	100	
