= Congressional Arts Caucus =

Political caucus in the United States

- Democratic Co-Chair: Rep. Chellie Pingree (ME-01)
- Republican Co-Chair: Rep. Elise Stefanik (NY-21)
- Political position: Bipartisan
- Colors: None official (gray unofficial)
- Seats in the House: 130 / 435

The Congressional Arts Caucus is a registered Congressional Member Organization for the US House of Representatives in the 115th Congress.

== History ==
The Congressional Arts Caucus was created in the 1980s as a way for the various members of Congress interested in the arts to be able to influence art legislation and to promote the National Endowment for the Arts.

== Members ==
As of the 117th Congress, the Congressional Arts Caucus has 120 members (106 Democrats, 14 Republicans). The members are listed by state:

- Terri Sewell (D‑AL‑7)
- Ruben Gallego (D‑AZ‑3)
- Raul Grijalva (D‑AZ‑7)
- French Hill (R‑AR‑2)
- Julia Brownley (D‑CA‑26)
- Tony Cardenas (D‑CA‑29)
- Lou Correa (D‑CA‑46)
- Anna Eshoo (D‑CA‑18)
- Jared Huffman (D‑CA‑2)
- Barbara Lee (D‑CA‑13)
- Ted Lieu (D‑CA‑36)
- Zoe Lofgren (D‑CA‑18)
- Alan Lowenthal (D‑CA‑47) retiring at end of current Congress.
- Doris Matsui (D‑CA‑7)
- Tom McClintock (D‑CA‑4)
- Grace Napolitano (D‑CA‑32)
- Jimmy Panetta (D‑CA‑20)
- Scott Peters (D‑CA‑52)
- Lucille Roybal-Allard (D‑CA‑40) retiring at end of current Congress.
- Linda Sanchez (D‑CA‑38)
- Adam Schiff (D‑CA‑28)
- Brad Sherman (D‑CA‑30)
- Jackie Speier (D‑CA‑14) retiring at end of current Congress.
- Mark Takano (D‑CA‑41)
- Mike Thompson (D‑CA‑5)
- Diana DeGette (D‑CO‑1)
- Joe Courtney (D‑CT‑2)
- Rosa DeLauro (D‑CT‑3)
- Jim Himes (D‑CT‑4)
- John Larson (D‑CT‑1)
- Lisa Blunt Rochester (D‑DE‑AL)
- Eleanor Holmes Norton (D‑DC‑AL)
- Vern Buchanan (R‑FL‑16)
- Kathy Castor (D‑FL‑14)
- Ted Deutch (D‑FL‑21) retiring at end of current Congress.
- Lois Frankel (D‑FL‑22)
- Bill Posey (D‑FL‑8)
- Debbie Wasserman Schultz (D‑FL‑23)
- Frederica Wilson (D‑FL‑24)
- Hank Johnson (D‑GA‑4)
- Michael Simpson (R‑ID‑2)
- Danny Davis (D‑IL‑7)
- Bill Foster (D‑IL‑11)
- Raja Krishnamoorthi (D‑IL‑8)
- Mike Quigley (D‑IL‑5)
- Jan Schakowsky (D‑IL‑9)
- André Carson (D‑IN‑7)
- Brett Guthrie (R‑KY‑2)
- John Yarmuth (R‑KY‑3) retiring at end of current Congress.
- Jared Golden (D‑ME‑2)
- Chellie Pingree (D‑ME‑1)
- John Sarbanes (D‑MD‑3)
- Bill Keating (D‑MA‑9)
- Stephen Lynch (D‑MA‑8)
- James McGovern (D‑MA‑2)
- Seth Moulton (D‑MA‑6)
- Richard Neal (D‑MA‑1)
- Ayanna Pressley (D‑MA‑7)
- Debbie Dingell (D‑MI‑12)
- Brenda Lawrence (D‑MI‑14) retiring at end of current Congress.
- Haley Stevens (D‑MI‑11)
- Fred Upton (R‑MI‑6) retiring at end of current Congress.
- Betty McCollum (D‑MN‑4)
- Dean Phillips (D‑MN‑3)
- Billy Long (R‑MO‑7) retiring at end of current Congress.
- Dina Titus (D‑NV‑1)
- Ann Kuster (D‑NH‑2)
- Josh Gottheimer (D‑NJ‑5)
- Donald Norcross (D‑NJ‑1)
- Frank Pallone (D‑NJ‑6)
- Bill Pascrell (D‑NJ‑9)
- Donald Payne Jr. (D‑NJ‑10)
- Albio Sires (D‑NJ‑8) retiring at end of current Congress.
- Bonnie Watson Coleman (D‑NJ‑12)
- Yvette Clarke (D‑NY‑9)
- Brian Higgins (D‑NY‑26)
- Carolyn Maloney (D‑NY‑12) lost renomination in 2022 due to redistricting.
- Sean Patrick Maloney (D‑NY‑18) lost re-election in 2022
- Jerry Nadler (D‑NY‑10)
- Elise Stefanik (R‑NY‑21)
- Paul Tonko (D‑NY‑20)
- Nydia Velázquez (D‑NY‑7)
- Alma Adams (D‑NC‑12)
- G. K. Butterfield (D‑NC‑1) retiring at end of current Congress.
- David Price (D‑NC‑4) retiring at end of current Congress.
- Gregorio Sablan (D‑MP‑AL)
- Bill Johnson (R‑OH‑6)
- Marcy Kaptur (D‑OH‑9)
- Tim Ryan (D‑OH‑13) retiring at end of current Congress.
- Earl Blumenauer (D‑OR‑3)
- Suzanne Bonamici (D‑OR‑1)
- Peter DeFazio (D‑OR‑4) retiring at end of current Congress.
- Kurt Schrader (D‑OR‑5) lost renomination in Democratic primary.
- Brendan Boyle (D‑PA‑2)
- Mike Doyle (D‑PA‑14) retiring at end of current Congress.
- Glenn Thompson (R‑PA‑15)
- David Cicilline (D‑RI‑1)
- James Langevin (D‑RI‑2) retiring at end of current Congress.
- James Clyburn (D‑SC‑6)
- Joe Wilson (R‑SC‑2)
- Steve Cohen (D‑TN‑9)
- Jim Cooper (D‑TN‑5) retiring at end of current Congress.
- Lloyd Doggett (D‑TX‑35)
- Vicente Gonzalez (D‑TX‑15)
- Kay Granger (R‑TX‑12)
- Al Green (D‑TX‑9)
- Sheila Jackson-Lee (D‑TX‑18)
- Eddie Bernice Johnson (D‑TX‑30) retiring at end of current Congress.
- Marc Veasey (D‑TX‑33)
- Peter Welch (D‑VT‑AL) retiring at end of current Congress.
- Don Beyer (D‑VA‑8)
- Gerry Connolly (D‑VA‑11)
- Robert Scott (D‑VA‑3)
- Suzan DelBene (D‑WA‑1)
- Derek Kilmer (D‑WA‑6)
- Rick Larsen (D‑WA‑2)
- Adam Smith (D‑WA‑9)
- David McKinley (R‑WV‑1) lost renomination in Republican primary.
- Ron Kind (D‑WI‑3) retiring at end of current Congress.
- Mark Pocan (D‑WI‑2)

=== Former members ===
- Ann Kirkpatrick (AZ-1) – retired in 2016 to seek a U.S. Senate seat, returned to the House in 2018 but did not rejoin the caucus.
- Kyrsten Sinema (AZ-9) – retired in 2018 to successfully seek a U.S. Senate seat.
- Lois Capps (CA-24) – retired from the House in 2016.
- Susan Davis (CA-53) - retired from the House in 2020.
- Sam Farr (CA-20) – retired from the House in 2016.
- Mike Honda (CA-17) – lost re-election in 2016.
- Duncan D. Hunter (CA-50) – resigned from the House in 2020.
- Loretta Sanchez (CA-46) – retired in 2016 to seek a U.S. Senate seat.
- Mike Coffman (CO-6) – lost re-election in 2018.
- Jared Polis (CO-2) – retired in 2018 to successfully run for Governor of Colorado.
- Elizabeth Esty (CT-5) – retired from the House in 2018.
- Corrine Brown (FL-5) – lost renomination in the 2016 Democratic primary.
- Alcee Hastings (FL-20) - died in office in 2021.
- Patrick Murphy (FL-18) – retired in 2016 to seek a U.S. Senate seat.
- Alan Grayson (FL-9) – retired in 2016 to seek a U.S. Senate seat.
- Tom Rooney (FL-17) – retired from the House in 2018.
- Ileana Ros-Lehtinen (FL-27) – retired from the House in 2018.
- John Lewis (GA-5) – died in office in 2020.
- Robert Dold (IL-10) – lost re-election in 2016.
- Luis Gutierrez (IL-4) – retired from the House in 2018.
- Dan Lipinski (IL-3) - retired from the House in 2020.
- Pete Visclosky (IN-1) - retired from the House in 2020.
- David Loebsack (IA-2) - retired from the House in 2020.
- Lynn Jenkins (KS-2) – retired from the House in 2018.
- John Fleming (LA-4) – retired in 2016 to seek a U.S. Senate seat.
- Elijah Cummings (MD-7) – died in office in 2019.
- John Delaney (MD-6) – retired in 2018 to run for President of the United States.
- Donna Edwards (MD-4) – retired in 2016 to seek a U.S. Senate seat.
- Chris Van Hollen (MD-8) – retired in 2016 to successfully seek a U.S. Senate seat.
- Michael Capuano (MA-7) – lost renomination in the 2018 Democratic primary.
- Niki Tsongas (MA-3) – retired from the House in 2018.
- John Conyers (MI-13) – resigned from the House in 2017.
- Sander Levin (MI-9) – retired from the House in 2018.
- Keith Ellison (MN-5) – retired in 2018 to successfully run for Attorney General of Minnesota.
- Rick Nolan (MN-8) – retired from the House in 2018.
- Erik Paulsen (MN-3) – lost re-election in 2018.
- Collin Peterson (MN-7) - lost re-election in 2020.
- Tim Walz (MN-1) – retired in 2018 to successfully run for Governor of Minnesota.
- Gregg Harper (MS-3) – retired from the House in 2018.
- William Lacy Clay (MO-1) - lost renomination in the 2020 Democratic primary.
- Brad Ashford (NE-2) – lost re-election in 2016.
- Carol Shea-Porter (NH-1) – retired from the House in 2018.
- Leonard Lance (NJ-7) – lost re-election in 2018.
- Frank LoBiondo (NJ-2) – retired from the House in 2018.
- Ben Ray Lujan (NM-3) - retired in 2020 to successfully seek a U.S. Senate seat.
- Antonio Delgado (NY-19) - resigned in 2022 to become Lieutenant Governor of New York.
- Eliot Engel (NY-16) - lost renomination in the 2020 Democratic primary.
- Steve Israel (NY-3) – retired from the House in 2016.
- Nita Lowey (NY-17) - retired from the House in 2020.
- Charles Rangel (NY-13) – retired from the House in 2016.
- José E. Serrano (NY-15) - retired from the House in 2020.
- Louise Slaughter (NY-25) – died in office in 2018.
- Marcia Fudge (OH-11) - resigned in 2021 to become U.S. Secretary of Housing and Urban Development.
- Steve Stivers (OH-15) - resigned in 2021 to become President and CEO of the Ohio Chamber of Commerce.
- Betty Sutton (OH-13) – lost re-election in 2012.
- Kendra Horn (OK-5) - lost re-election in 2020.
- Bob Brady (PA-1) – retired from the House in 2018.
- Charlie Dent (PA-15) – resigned from the House in 2018.
- Brian Fitzpatrick (PA-8) – Left caucus, still serving in the House.
- Tim Murphy (PA-18) – resigned from the House in 2017.
- Pedro Pierluisi (PR-at large) – retired from the House in 2016.
- Kristi Noem (SD-at large) – retired in 2018 to successfully run for Governor of South Dakota.
- Phil Roe (TN-1) - retired from the House in 2020.
- Gene Green (TX-29) – retired from the House in 2018.
- Pete Olson (TX-22) - retired from the House in 2020.
- Beto O'Rourke (TX-16) – retired in 2018 to seek a U.S. Senate seat.
- Lamar Smith (TX-21) – retired from the House in 2018.
- Jason Chaffetz (UT-3) – retired from the House in 2018.
- Barbara Comstock (VA-10) – lost re-election in 2018.
- Denny Heck (WA-10) - retired in 2020 to successfully run for Lieutenant Governor of Washington.
- Jim McDermott (WA-7) – retired from the House in 2016.
- Dave Reichert (WA-8) – retired from the House in 2018.
- Evan Jenkins (WV-3) – resigned from the House in 2018.
- Reid Ribble (WI-8) – retired from the House in 2016.
- Cynthia Lummis (WY-at large) – retired from the House in 2016.

Last updated: May 31, 2022
