= Kurt Zwikl =

American politician (1949–2021)

Kurt D. Zwikl

Member of the Pennsylvania House of Representatives from the 132nd district
- In office November 15, 1973 – November 30, 1984
- Preceded by: Samuel Frank
- Succeeded by: John Pressman

Personal details
- Born: June 28, 1949 Allentown, Pennsylvania, U.S.
- Died: September 1, 2021 (aged 72) Allentown, Pennsylvania, U.S.
- Party: Democratic

Kurt D. Zwikl (June 28, 1949 – September 1, 2021) was a Democratic member of the Pennsylvania House of Representatives. He was first elected on November 15, 1973.

Zwikl died on September 1, 2021.
