= John Pressman =

American politician

John F. Pressmann

Member of the Pennsylvania House of Representatives from the 132nd district
- In office January 1, 1985 – November 30, 1990
- Preceded by: Kurt Zwickl
- Succeeded by: Charlie Dent

Personal details
- Born: September 6, 1952 Salisbury, Maryland
- Died: July 24, 2009 (aged 57) Sierra Mountains, Inyo County, California
- Party: Democratic

John Fallon Pressmann (September 6, 1952 – July 24, 2009) was a Democratic member of the Pennsylvania House of Representatives.

== Biography ==
=== Early life ===
John Pressmann was born on September 6, 1952, in Salisbury, Maryland. His family moved to Allentown, Pennsylvania, where he graduated from the Allentown Central Catholic High School as part of the class of 1971. He then attended the Lehigh County Community College before transferring to the East Stroudsburg State College and then Cedar Crest College where he graduated with a Bachelor of Science.

=== Political career ===
Pressmann was a member of the Lehigh County Democratic Committee from 1974 to 1978 and was an elected constable of Lehigh County from 1980 to 1981. Then he was elected the Lehigh County commissioner from 1982 to 1984. Pressmann would be elected to the Pennsylvania House of Representatives for the 132nd district, serving from 1985 to 1990 when he was stunningly upset by Republican Political outsider Charlie Dent.

Pressmann attempted to stage a political comeback as the Democratic candidate for the 1993 Allentown mayoral election, however, after a particularly heated primary against city councilwoman Emma Tropiano, she ran a write in campaign splitting the Democratic vote and allowing Republican William L. Heydt to win the election with 46.9% of the vote.

=== Later life and death ===
After his defeat in the mayoral election, Presmann retired from politics and became a teacher. While on vacation hiking in the Sierra Mountains of California in 2009, Pressmann would collapse and die at the age of 57.

== Personal life ==
Pressman was a member of the Pennsylvania Young Democrats, was a member of the Lehigh Valley Democrat Association, and chairman of the Allentown Redevelopment Authority.
