= Charlie Dent =

American politician (born 1960)

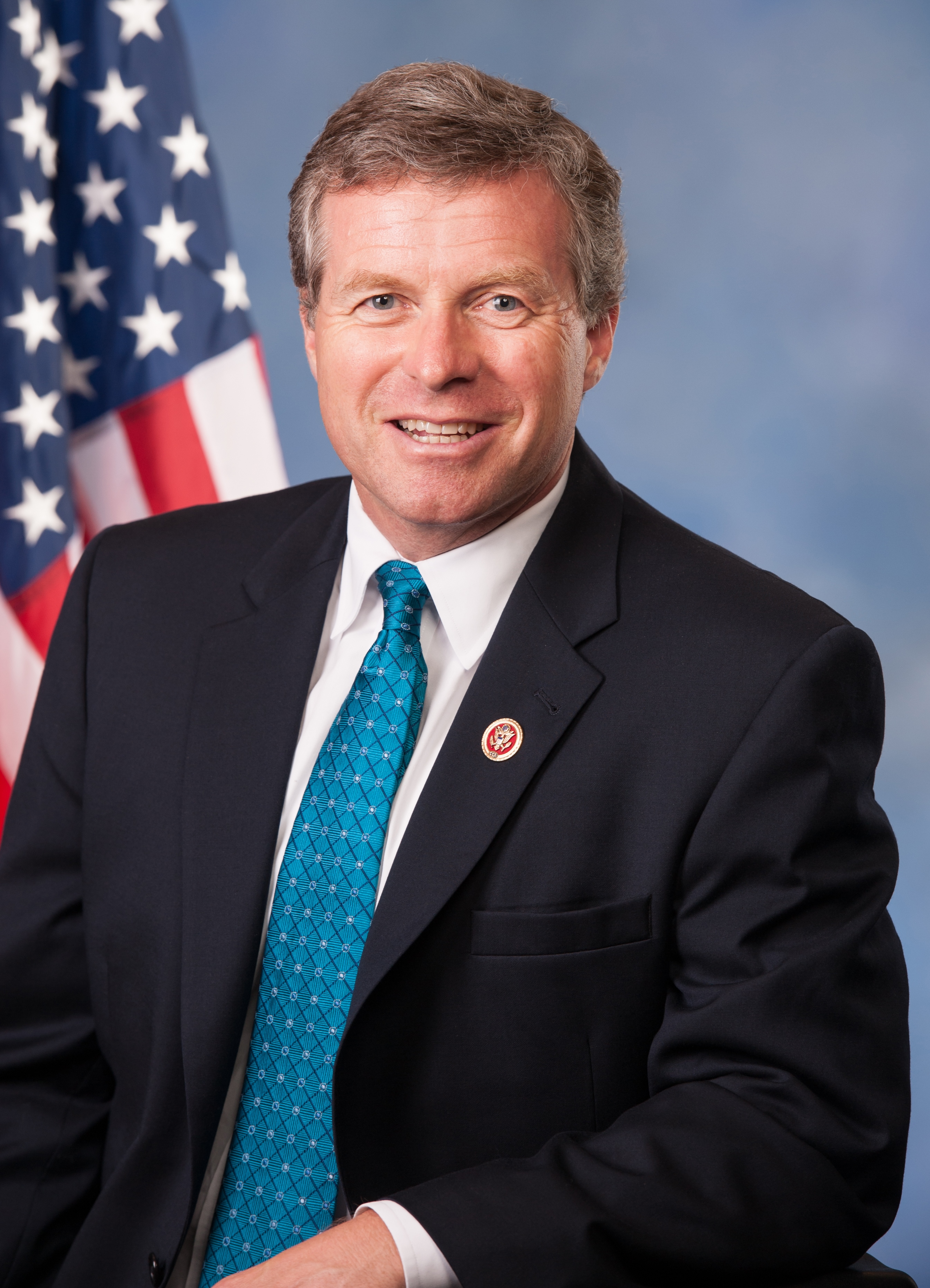
- Official portrait, 2014

Chair of the House Ethics Committee
- In office January 3, 2015 – January 3, 2017
- Preceded by: Mike Conaway
- Succeeded by: Susan Brooks

Member of the U.S. House of Representatives from Pennsylvania's 15th district
- In office January 3, 2005 – May 12, 2018
- Preceded by: Pat Toomey
- Succeeded by: Susan Wild

Member of the Pennsylvania Senate from the 16th district
- In office January 5, 1999 – November 30, 2004
- Preceded by: Roy Afflerbach
- Succeeded by: Pat Browne

Member of the Pennsylvania House of Representatives from the 132nd district
- In office January 1, 1991 – November 25, 1998
- Preceded by: John Pressman
- Succeeded by: Jennifer Mann

Personal details
- Born: Charles Wieder Dent; May 24, 1960 (age 66) Allentown, Pennsylvania, U.S.
- Party: Republican
- Spouse: Pamela Serfass
- Children: 3
- Education: Pennsylvania State University (BA); Lehigh University (MPA)

Charles Wieder Dent (born May 24, 1960) is an American politician who served as a Republican member of the United States House of Representatives for Pennsylvania's 15th congressional district from 2005 to 2018.

Born in Allentown, Pennsylvania, Dent worked in a variety of occupations after graduating from Pennsylvania State University. He earned a master's degree in public administration from Lehigh University and served as an aide to Congressman Donald L. Ritter. From 1991 to 2004, he served in the Pennsylvania General Assembly. In 2004, Dent won election to the United States House of Representatives, succeeding Pat Toomey.

In the House, Dent became a member of the centrist Republican Main Street Partnership and the Tuesday Group. He became co-chair of the Tuesday Group in 2007. He served on the House Committee on Appropriations, and previously chaired the House Ethics Committee.

In September 2017, Dent announced that he would retire from Congress and not seek re-election to another term in 2018. In April 2018, Dent announced that he would retire in May 2018, not serving out the remainder of his term. He resigned on May 12, 2018, leaving the seat vacant.

== Early life and education ==
Dent was born and raised in Allentown, Pennsylvania, the son of Marjorie L. (née Wieder) and Walter R. Dent. He is of German, English, and Irish descent. Dent is a 1978 graduate of Allentown's William Allen High School. He received a bachelor's in international politics from Pennsylvania State University in 1982, and a masters in public administration from Lehigh University in 1993. He is a member of Phi Kappa Psi.

== Career ==
Prior to pursuing elected office, Dent worked as a development officer at Lehigh University, an industrial electronics salesman, a hotel clerk, and an aide to U.S. Representative Donald L. Ritter.

=== Pennsylvania legislature ===
Before being elected to the United States Congress, Dent was a member of the State Legislature for 14 years. He represented Pennsylvania's 132nd house district from 1991 to 1999 after unseating Democratic incumbent Jack Pressman in a heavily Democratic district in 1990.

In 1998, Dent won an open 16th District Senate seat when Democrat Roy Afflerbach, who later served as Mayor of Allentown from 2002 to 2006, retired to take up an ultimately unsuccessful bid for Congress.

== U.S. House of Representatives ==
=== Elections ===
==== 2004 ====
Dent was elected to the United States House of Representatives in 2004, succeeding Pat Toomey, who gave up his seat to challenge Arlen Specter for the U.S. Senate. He defeated Democrat Joe Driscoll 59%–39%.

==== 2006 ====
He won re-election 54%–44% against Charles Dertinger.

==== 2008 ====
He won re-election 59%–41% against Allentown Democratic Party Chairman Sam Bennett.

==== 2010 ====
Dent won re-election against Bethlehem Mayor John Callahan with 54% of the vote, the smallest percent of the vote he received in any of his election campaigns.

==== 2012 ====
Dent defeated Democrat Rick Daugherty, the Chairman of the Lehigh County Democratic Party, 57%–43%.

==== 2014 ====
Dent won re-election unopposed.

==== 2016 ====
Dent defeated Daugherty in a rematch, 58%–38%.

=== Tenure ===
Dent introducing legislation (HR 1254) to ban the ingredients found in synthetic marijuana on December 7, 2011. The House passed the legislation December 8, 2011. Video: C-SPAN

Dent is a moderate Republican. The non-partisan National Journal gave Dent a composite ideological rating of 62% conservative and 38% liberal in 2013. The National Journal considered Dent to be one of the three most moderate Republicans in that year. GovTrack placed Dent near the ideological center of the House of Representatives; the liberal American Civil Liberties Union gave him a rating of 35% and the fiscally conservative United States Chamber of Commerce gave him a 95% rating. Dent was ranked as the 47th-most bipartisan member of the U.S. House of Representatives during the 114th United States Congress (and the fourth most bipartisan member of the U.S. House of Representatives from Pennsylvania) in the Bipartisan Index created by The Lugar Center and the McCourt School of Public Policy that ranks members of the United States Congress by their degree of bipartisanship (by measuring the frequency each member's bills attract co-sponsors from the opposite party and each member's co-sponsorship of bills by members of the opposite party).

In 2014, Dent introduced a bill to give states more flexibility in how they provide health insurance to children from families between 100 and 133 percent of the federal poverty level, according to The Ripon Advance.

The Next Generation Choices Foundation selected Dent to be the Elsie Hillman Speaker at their annual National Cancer Prevention Day event in 2016 in recognition of his efforts to support legislation related to cancer prevention.

Before retiring, Dent voted in line with President Donald Trump's position on legislation 93% of the time. After announcing his retirement during late 2017, he said that dealing with the "freewheeling president" became "exhausting". According to The Hill, he said "disorder, chaos, instability, uncertainty, intemperate statements" were not "conservative virtues". He delivered a farewell speech on May 10, and resigned on May 12, 2018, leaving the seat vacant.

=== Political positions ===
==== Social policy ====
In April 2011, after admitting that it was highly controversial, Dent voted along with the other Republican members of the House for a budget bill that would have abolished government-run Medicare. It proposed to make senior citizens purchase individual private health insurance using vouchers that would have covered only a part of their costs. The Congressional Budget Office found that privatizing Medicare under this plan would significantly increase the out-of-pocket costs to seniors; by 2030, the out-of-pocket share for standard medical expenses paid by a typical 65-year-old would have risen to 68% under the Republican plan, as opposed to 25% under the then existing Medicare system. The CBO found that the Republican bill would also have increased the budget deficit for at least a decade.

Dent voted against the 2007 Re-authorization of the Children's Health Insurance Program (CHIP). Dent consistently opposed the Affordable Care Act, commonly known as Obamacare. However he broke with his party and voted against one of the Republican attempts to repeal Obamacare in 2017.

As a Republican who represented a district with Democratic leanings, he occasionally crossed party lines on legislation. On the issue of abortion and reproductive health care, Dent is a pro-choice Republican. In 2018, Planned Parenthood, which supports legal access to abortion and birth control, gave Dent a 41% lifetime score for voting with their positions and the anti-abortion National Right to Life Committee, which opposes legal abortion, gave him a 50% rating in the same year. He co-sponsored legislation to fund embryonic stem-cell research and was one of the Republicans who broke with their party to support the use of embryos in research. Dent supported same-sex marriage. He cosponsored the Employment Non-Discrimination Act which would have banned employment discrimination based on sexual orientation and he voted to allow foreign same-sex partners to receive green cards. The Human Rights Campaign, which supports same-sex marriage and LGBT rights, gave him a 68% for their legislative scorecard. In December 2010, Dent was one of fifteen Republican House members to vote in favor of repealing the United States military's "Don't Ask, Don't Tell" ban on openly gay service members.

==== Citizenship and immigration ====
In April 2010, Dent introduced a resolution urging the U.S. State Department to issue a Certificate of Loss of Nationality to Anwar al-Awlaki. He said al-Awlaki "preaches a culture of hate" and had been a functioning member of al-Qaeda "since before 9/11", and had effectively renounced his U.S. citizenship by engaging in treasonous acts. Anwar al-Awlaki was killed in a U.S. drone strike in Yemen on September 30, 2011, and his 16-year-old son, Abdulrahman was likewise killed two weeks later; both strikes were ordered by U.S. President Barack Obama. Al-Awlaki's eight-year-daughter Nawar, also a U.S. citizen, was killed in a SEAL commando raid in Yemen on January 29, 2017. The raid was ordered by President Donald Trump. In it, a SEAL was killed and an Osprey aircraft was destroyed.

In January 2012, Dent co-sponsored the Enemy Expatriation Act with Senator Joe Lieberman. The bill's purpose was "To add engaging in or supporting hostilities against the United States to the list of acts for which United States nationals would lose their nationality," where the term "hostilities" means any conflict subject to the laws of war. The proposal would allow the United States government to strip U.S. citizens of their citizenship without requiring that the citizen have been convicted of a crime.

Dent criticized President Donald Trump's 2017 executive order to temporarily curtail Muslim immigration until better screening methods were devised. He stated that "This is ridiculous. I guess I understand what his intention is, but unfortunately the order appears to have been rushed through without full consideration. You know, there are many, many nuances of immigration policy that can be life or death for many innocent, vulnerable people around the world."

==== Economy ====
In 2005, Dent cosponsored H.R. 4411, the Goodlatte-Leach Internet Gambling Prohibition Act. Dent stated in 2018 that he would "tuck" his Export-Import Bank bill into the spending bill as an omnibus. The bill would "lower the quorum on the board so it could approve large loans once more." As of 2018, the reopened bank had a seven-member board that lacked a quorum.

==== Education ====
At the start of the 112th Congress, Dent received a new position on the coveted House Appropriations Committee, and continued to serve on the House Ethics Committee. In June 2013, Dent decided to co-sponsor the Safe Schools Improvement Act (SSIA), a bill that would require schools and districts to adopt policies specifically prohibiting bullying and harassment against all students, including LGBT young people. Dent is known for his efforts to promote LGBT equality throughout the nation.

==== Energy ====
Dent is a proponent of hydrogen fuel and was one of the four founding members of the House Hydrogen Fuel Cell Caucus. In 2006, he proposed legislation aimed at promoting the rollout of commercial hydrogen fueling stations. He has spoken of his vision for the development of a "Hydrogen Highway East", similar to California Governor Arnold Schwarzenegger's plans for a Hydrogen Highway on the West Coast. Dent is a member of The Republican Main Street Partnership. In 2007 he was elected to co-chair the Tuesday Group, a centrist organization of Congressional Republicans.

==== Drug policy ====
Dent is a proponent of drug prohibition, and is outspoken on the dangers of novel synthetic drugs, having personally sponsored several bills aimed to schedule new psychoactive compounds. In 2011, he sponsored the Synthetic Drug Control Act of 2011, which sought to schedule a large number of cannabimimetic agents, as well as 26 other psychoactive substances. The bill passed the House but did not make its way through the Senate. On March 27, 2017, the bill was re-introduced as the Synthetic Drug Control Act of 2017. If passed in its current text (as of May 14, 2017), this bill would schedule a large number of novel psychoactive substances, including 96 phenethylamines, 94 cannabimimetic agents, 15 arylcyclohexylamines, 21 tryptamines, 8 benzylpiperazines, 4 benzodiazepines, 4 opioid or opioid-like substances, 8 piperazines, and 2 tropane alkaloids.

=== Committee assignments ===
- Committee on Appropriations
  - Subcommittee on Military Construction, Veterans Affairs, and Related Agencies (Chair)
  - Subcommittee on State, Foreign Operations, and Related Programs (Vice Chair)
  - United States House Appropriations Subcommittee on Labor, Health and Human Services, Education, and Related Agencies
- United States House Committee on Ethics (Chair)

=== Caucus memberships ===
- Congressional Arts Caucus
- Congressional Cement Caucus, Co-chair
- U.S.-Japan Caucus
- Friends of Wales Caucus
- Problem Solvers Caucus

== Electoral history ==
U.S. House, 15th District of Pennsylvania (General Election)
Year	Winning candidate	Party	Pct	Opponent	Party	Pct	Opponent	Party	Pct	Opponent	Party	Pct
2004	Charlie Dent	Republican	59%	Joe Driscoll	Democratic	39%	Richard J. Piotrowski	Libertarian	1%	Greta Browne	Green Party	1%
2006	Charlie Dent (inc.)	Republican	54%	Charles Dertinger	Democratic	43%				Greta Browne	Green Party	3%
2008	Charlie Dent (inc.)	Republican	59%	Sam Bennett	Democratic	41%						
2010	Charlie Dent (inc.)	Republican	54%	John Callahan	Democratic	39%	Jake Towne	Independent	7%			
2012	Charlie Dent (inc.)	Republican	57%	Rick Daugherty	Democratic	43%						
2014	Charlie Dent (inc.)	Republican	100%									
2016	Charlie Dent (inc.)	Republican	58%	Rick Daugherty	Democratic	38%	Paul Rizzo	Libertarian	4%			

== Post-political career ==
Following his resignation from Congress, Dent joined the law firm DLA Piper as a non-attorney policy adviser. He registered as a lobbyist following the mandatory one-year cooling off period.

On August 19, 2020, Dent announced his formal endorsement of Joe Biden, the Democratic nominee for the 2020 presidential election, joining other Republicans such as Colin Powell, John Kasich, Christine Todd Whitman, Jeff Flake, Chuck Hagel, Susan Molinari and John Warner in choosing to vote for the Democrat in the election.

On July 6, 2022, Dent endorsed Democrat Josh Shapiro in the Pennsylvania Governor Election over Republican Doug Mastriano, claiming that Shapiro would 'unite the state' and that Mastriano 'is a threat to the rule of law'.

On May 24, 2024, Dent appeared on C-SPAN's Washington Journal to discuss the formation of the group Our Republican Legacy to facilitate what organizers call a "comeback" of the traditional principles of the party.

On May 15, 2024, Dent had been challenged by CNN anchor Kasie Hunt to reveal details about the funding of the organization. Dent said, "I'm not here to say how much money we have," and claimed: "We're going to be able to advance a program with digital marketing, with all kinds of things. So, don't worry about that. We're getting started. We're going to be well capitalized."

As of May 2025, the organization's Instagram had 55 followers. As of February 2026, ORL's Instagram had 299 followers. "Our Republican Legacy". February 21, 2026.

== Personal life ==
Dent is married to Pamela Jane Serfass and has three children.

U.S. House of Representatives
Preceded by Pat Toomey	Member of the U.S. House of Representatives from Pennsylvania's 15th congressional district 2005–2018	Succeeded by Susan Wild
Preceded by Mike Conaway	Chair of the House Ethics Committee; 2015–2017	Succeeded by Susan Brooks
Party political offices
Preceded by Charles Bass	Chair of the Tuesday Group; 2007–2018; Served alongside: Mark Kirk (2007–2010), Jo Ann Emerson (2010–2013), Erik Paulsen (2013–2015), Adam Kinzinger (2013–2017), Bob Dold (2015–2017), Tom MacArthur (2017), Elise Stefanik (2017–2018), John Katko (2017–2018)	Succeeded by John Katko; Elise Stefanik
U.S. order of precedence (ceremonial)
Preceded by Jim Gerlach as Former U.S. Representative	Order of precedence of the United States as Former U.S. Representative	Succeeded by Matt Cartwright as Former U.S. Representative
