= Elise Stefanik =

American politician (born 1984)

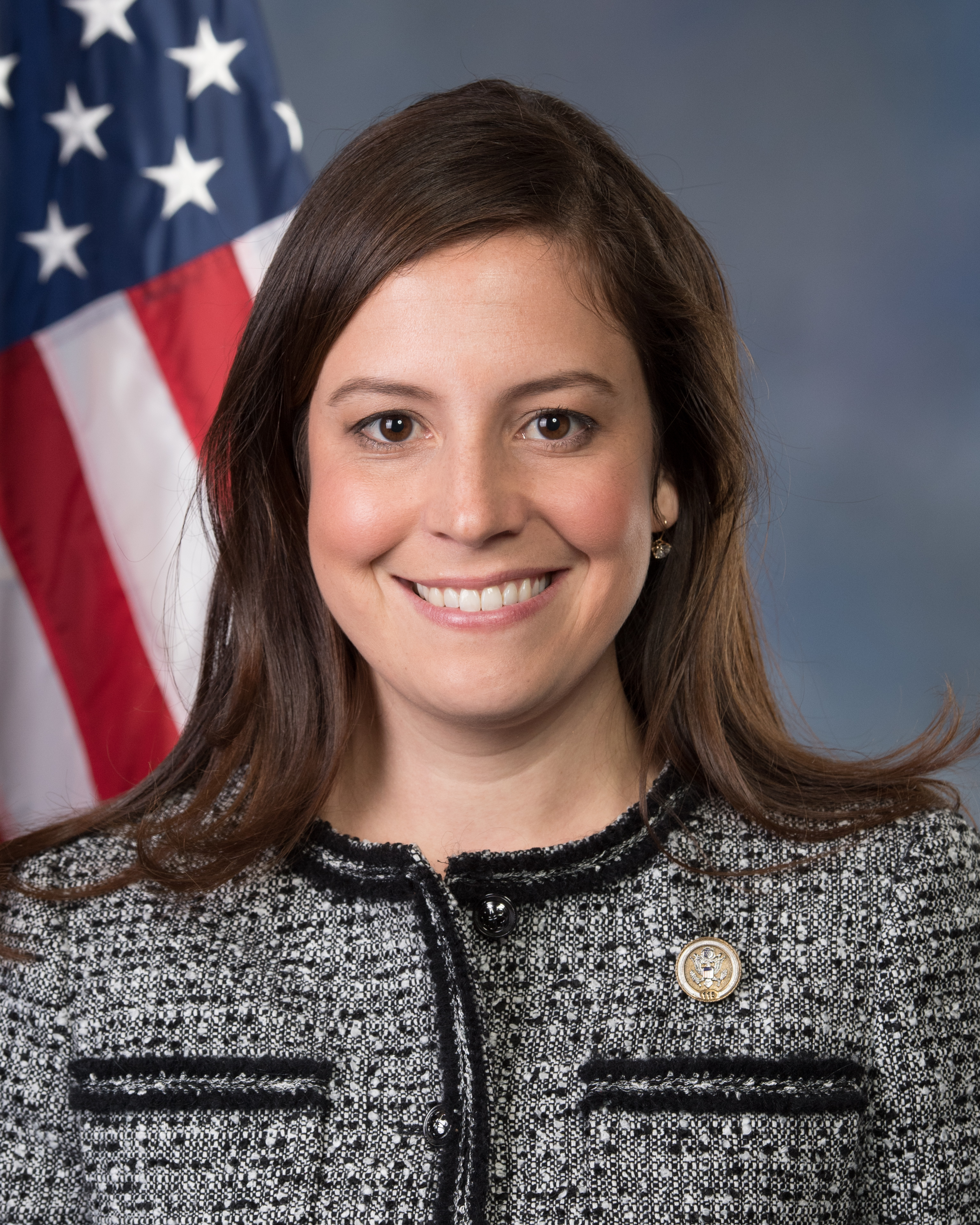
- Official portrait, 2017

Member of the U.S. House of Representatives from New York's 21st district
- Incumbent
- Assumed office January 3, 2015
- Preceded by: Bill Owens
- Succeeded by: Anthony Constantino (elect)

Chair of the House Republican Conference
- In office May 14, 2021 – January 3, 2025
- Leader: Kevin McCarthy; Mike Johnson
- Preceded by: Liz Cheney
- Succeeded by: Lisa McClain

Personal details
- Born: Elise Marie Stefanik; July 2, 1984 (age 42) Albany, New York, U.S.
- Party: Republican
- Spouse: Matthew Manda (m. 2017)
- Children: 1
- Education: Harvard University (BA); Naval War College (attended)
- Website: House website Campaign website
- Elise Stefanik's voice Elise Stefanik on researching the impact of the hemlock woolly adelgid species on trees Recorded May 18, 2018

Elise Marie Stefanik (/stəˈfɑːnɪk/ stə-FAH-nik; born July 2, 1984) is an American politician who has served as the U.S. representative for New York's 21st congressional district since 2015. From 2021 to 2025, she served as chair of the House Republican Conference.

Stefanik was elected as a moderate Republican but aligned herself with Donald Trump during his first term as president. Stefanik strongly opposed the first impeachment of Trump in 2019 and objected to Pennsylvania's electoral votes in the 2020 U.S. presidential election. Stefanik was elected chair of the House Republican Conference in May 2021 after Liz Cheney was removed from the position for her vocal opposition to Trump.

In 2023, Stefanik gained national attention for her aggressive questioning of university presidents during a widely televised U.S. congressional hearing on antisemitism, which contributed to the resignation of Liz Magill as the president of the University of Pennsylvania. Stefanik was awarded the Dr. Miriam and Sheldon Adelson Defender of Israel Award by the Zionist Organization of America.

In January 2025, President Trump nominated Stefanik to serve as the United States ambassador to the United Nations. Trump withdrew the nomination in March over concerns that her departure from the House would affect the thin House Republican majority. In November 2025, Stefanik announced her candidacy in the 2026 New York gubernatorial election, but ended her campaign the following month and announced she would not run for re-election to Congress.

== Early life and education ==
Stefanik was born in Albany, New York, on July 2, 1984, to Melanie and Kenneth Stefanik. Stefanik states that her father is ethnically Czech and her mother is of Italian ancestry; genealogical records show that her father's Polish family came from western Galicia (at the time part of the Kingdom of Galicia and Lodomeria), mainly from the then shtetl of Frysztak (Yiddish: Fristik; German: Freistadt) located near Jasło and Strzyżów. Her parents own a wholesale plywood distributor based in Guilderland Center, New York.

At the age of 14, Stefanik became involved in Republican politics and volunteered for the New York Republican State Committee. According to Stefanik, she first considered a career in public service and policy in the aftermath of the September 11 attacks.

In 2002, Stefanik graduated from the Albany Academy for Girls. She attended Harvard College, where she graduated with a Bachelor of Arts in 2006. In 2004, she was the vice president of the Student Advisory Committee at the Harvard Institute of Politics.

According to Rep. Henry Cuellar, as of August 2023, Stefanik, Jake LaTurner and he were enrolled in the master's in defense and strategic studies program at the Naval War College.

== Early career ==
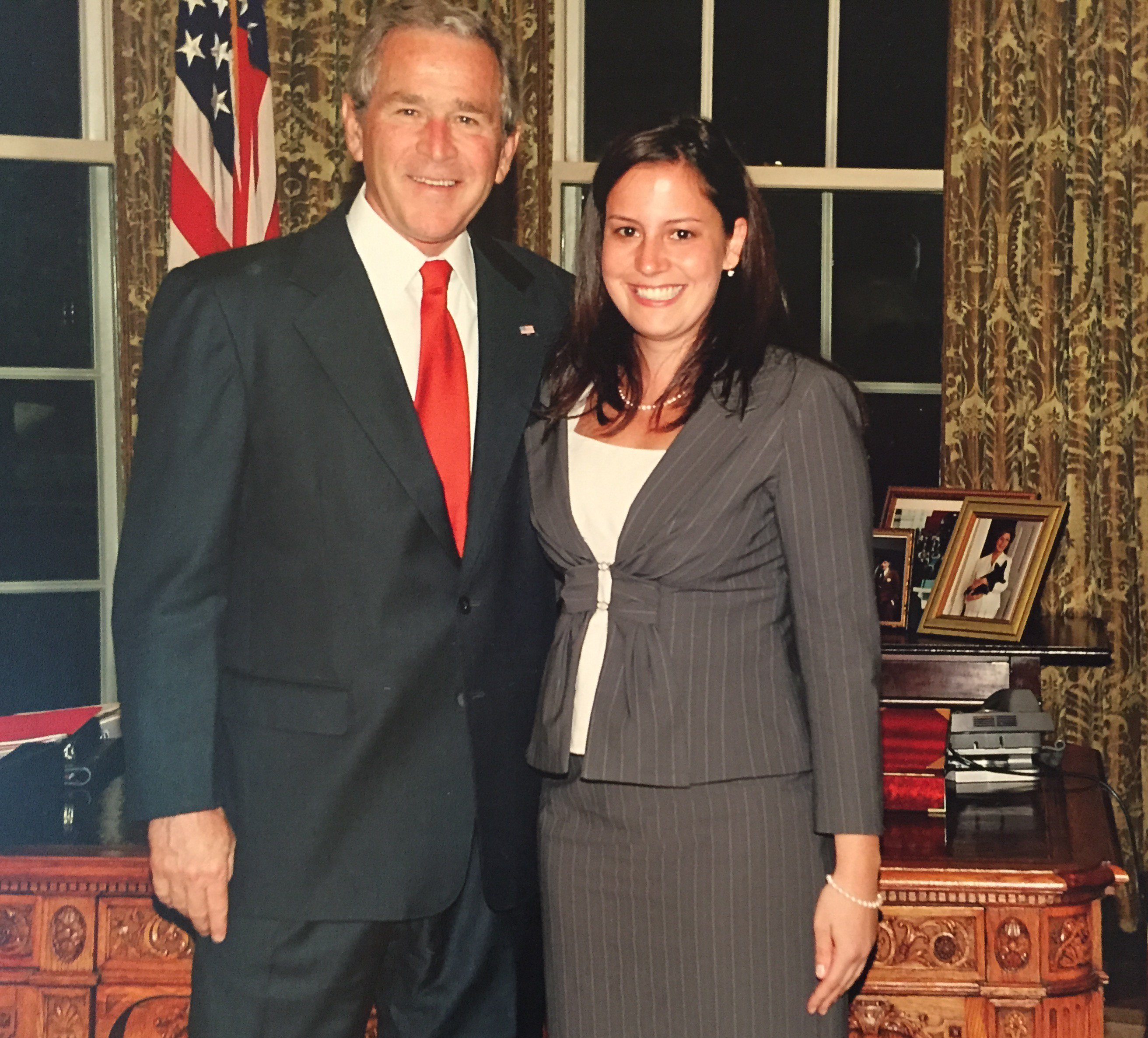
Stefanik with President George W. Bush in the Oval Office in the 2000s

After graduating from Harvard, Stefanik joined the George W. Bush administration as a staff member for the U.S. Domestic Policy Council. Stefanik later worked in the office of Joshua Bolten, the White House chief of staff. In 2009, she founded the blog "American Maggie", a platform to promote the views of "conservative and Republican women". The blog was named after British prime minister Margaret Thatcher.

Stefanik helped prepare the Republican platform for the 2012 United States presidential election, served as director of new media for Tim Pawlenty's presidential exploratory committee, and worked at the Foundation for Defense of Democracies and at Foreign Policy Initiative. She managed Rep. Paul Ryan's preparation for the 2012 vice presidential debate. After the Mitt Romney-Paul Ryan ticket was defeated in the 2012 presidential election, she returned to upstate New York and joined her parents' business.

== U.S. House of Representatives ==
=== First election ===
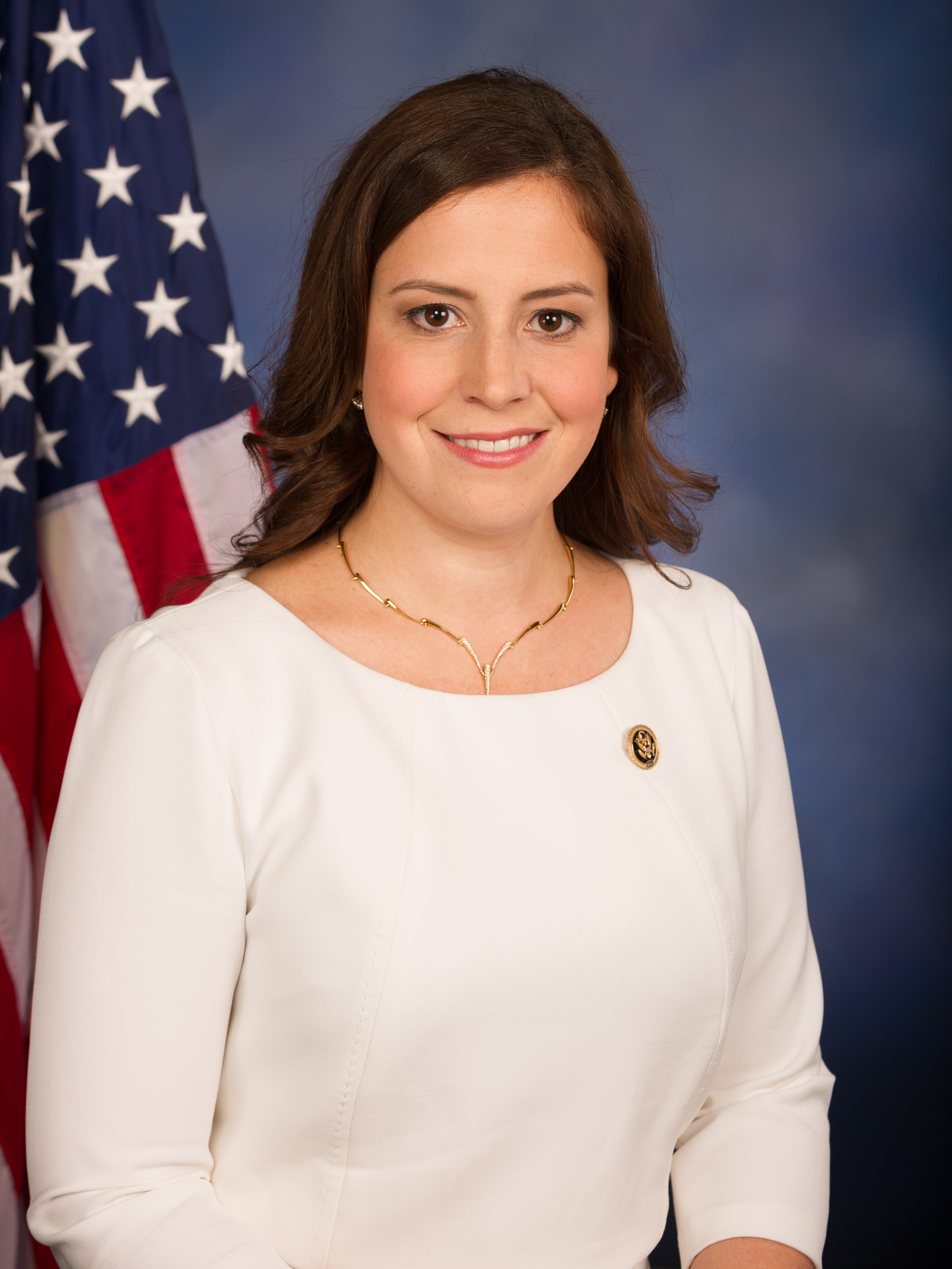
Stefanik's freshman portrait during the 114th Congress (2015)

In August 2013, Stefanik declared her candidacy in the 2014 election for the U.S. House of Representatives in New York's 21st congressional district. The district had been in Republican hands for 100 years, before Democrat Bill Owens was elected to represent it in a 2009 special election. In January 2014, Owens announced that he would not seek reelection. Doug Hoffman, the Conservative Party's congressional nominee in 2009, endorsed Stefanik.

Stefanik defeated Matt Doheny in the 2014 Republican primary election, 60.8% to 39.2%. She faced Aaron Woolf, the Democratic Party nominee, and Matt Funiciello, the Green Party nominee, in the November 4 general election. Stefanik won with 55.1% of the vote to their 33.8% and 11%, respectively. At the time, the 30-year-old Stefanik was the youngest woman ever elected to Congress. Stefanik's record was broken four years later by her fellow representative from New York, Alexandria Ocasio-Cortez, who was elected at age 29.

=== Tenure ===
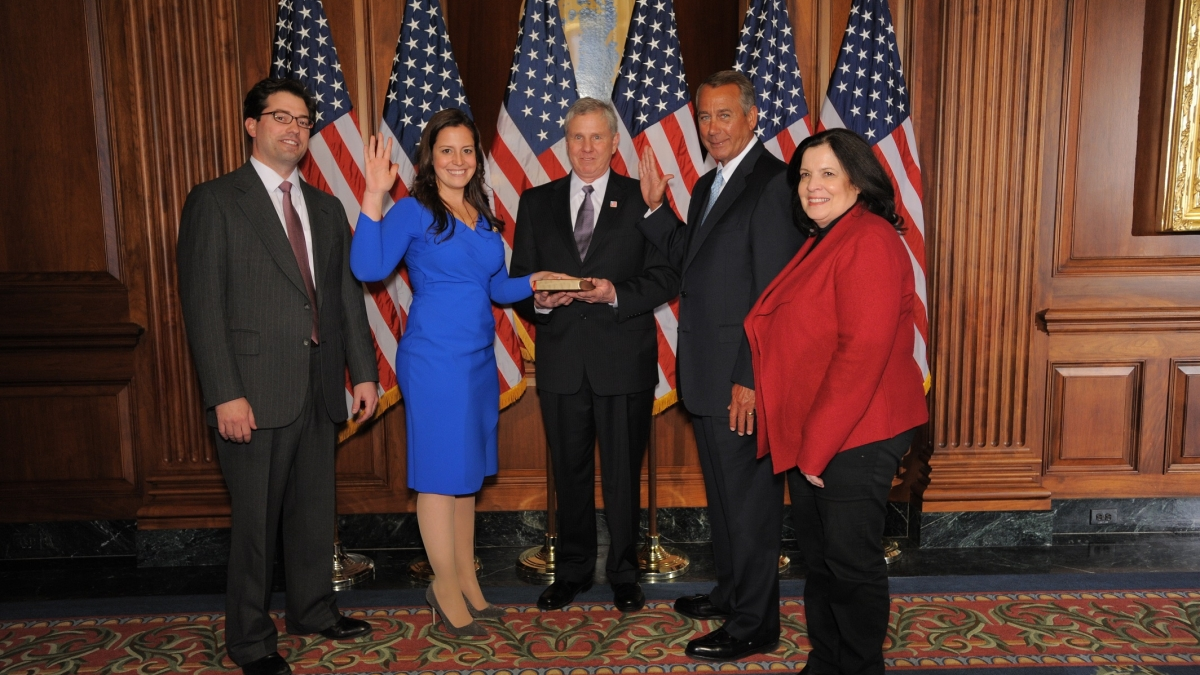
Stefanik takes the oath of office by House Speaker John Boehner in January 2015.

The freshman representatives of the 114th United States Congress elected Stefanik to serve as the freshman representative to the policy committee. In February 2015, she was appointed vice chair of the United States House Armed Services Subcommittee on Readiness.

On January 11, 2017, Stefanik announced that she had been elected co-chair of the Tuesday Group, "a caucus of ... moderate House Republicans from across the country".

Stefanik led recruitment for the National Republican Congressional Committee (NRCC) in the 2018 House elections; among 13 Republican women elected to the House, only one was newly elected. In December 2018, Stefanik announced she would leave the NRCC to create a "leadership PAC" dedicated to recruiting Republican women to run for office. This group, named Elevate PAC (E-PAC), announced in an October 22 press conference that it had partially funded the primary campaigns of 11 Republican women from various states. In the 2020 House elections, 18 of the 30 women endorsed by Stefanik's E-PAC were elected.

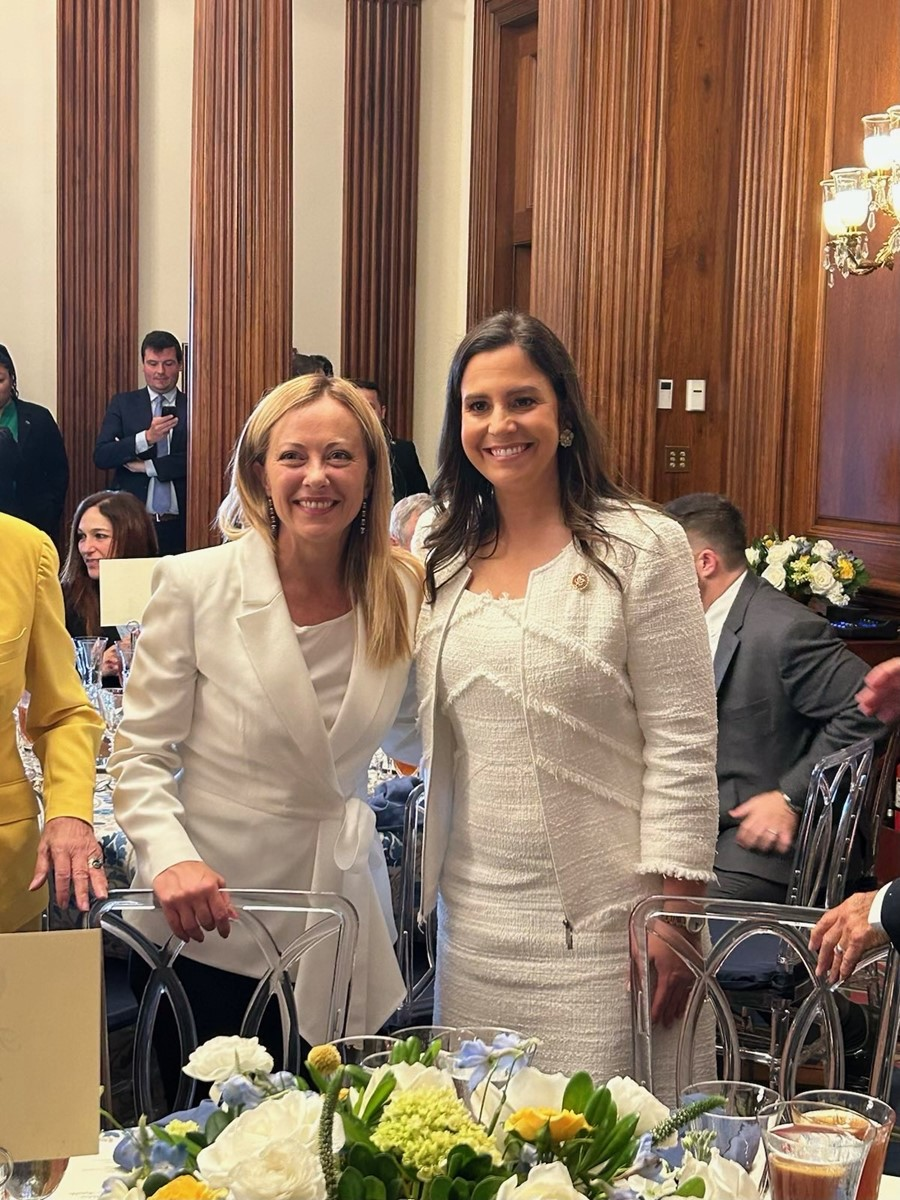
Stefanik with Italian Prime Minister Giorgia Meloni, July 27, 2023

In 2020, Fortune magazine included Stefanik in its "40 Under 40" listing in the "Government and Politics" category.

On May 19, 2021, Stefanik and all other House Republican leaders voted against establishing a January 6 commission to investigate the January 6 United States Capitol attack. Thirty-five Republican House members and all 217 Democrats present voted to establish such a commission.

Stefanik announced in November 2025 that she would not seek re-election in 2026 and would instead run for Governor of New York. The following month, she announced that she was ending her gubernatorial campaign, but did not change her mind on not seeking reelection to the House of Representatives.

=== Committee assignments ===
For the 119th Congress:

- Committee on Armed Services
  - Subcommittee on Cyber, Information Technologies, and Innovation
  - Subcommittee on Military Personnel
  - Subcommittee on Strategic Forces
- Committee on Education and Workforce
  - Subcommittee on Higher Education and Workforce Development
- Permanent Select Committee on Intelligence
  - Subcommittee on Defense Intelligence and Overhead Architecture
  - Subcommittee on Open Source Intelligence

==== Party leadership campaign ====
In early 2021, after House Republican Conference chair Liz Cheney supported Donald Trump's second impeachment and refuted his claims that the election was stolen from him, some Republicans in Congress who supported Trump called for her removal. Stefanik was seen as a potential replacement for Cheney if the Republican conference decided to oust Cheney from her position, despite Cheney's more conservative credentials and greater voting record in support of Trump's policies. On May 5, Stefanik received the endorsement of Trump and House minority whip Steve Scalise to replace Cheney as conference chair. During a May 6 appearance on a podcast hosted by Steve Bannon, Stefanik repeatedly emphasized the need for the Republican Party to work with Trump. Representative Chip Roy challenged Stefanik from the right in a bid to replace Cheney, but was denounced by Trump, who reiterated his endorsement of Stefanik. On May 14, Stefanik was elected House Republican Conference chair. After her victory, Stefanik thanked Trump, saying, "President Trump is the leader that [Republican voters] look to".

A couple of weeks after being elected House Republican Conference chair, Politico reported that Stefanik had been responsible for planting negative stories about Jim Banks, a potential competitor for the job, and his aide Buckley Carlson, Tucker Carlson's son. This was met with displeasure by allies of Donald Trump Jr., who made it known to Stefanik that her attacks on Carlson's son had crossed a line.

After the 2022 elections, Stefanik was reelected as conference chair, defeating Byron Donalds.

==== 2023 hearing on antisemitism ====
During a 2023 hearing on antisemitism of the House Education and Workforce Committee, Stefanik asked the presidents of Harvard, MIT, and the University of Pennsylvania, who had been invited to speak, whether "calling for the genocide of Jewish people" constituted bullying or harassment on their campuses. Stefanik characterized the slogan "From the River to the Sea" and calls for an intifada as genocidal. Their responses, in which they did not say whether use of such slogans violated campus codes of conduct, drew criticism from a group of representatives who signed an open letter calling for all three to resign. UPenn president Liz Magill, who was already facing pressure from within the university, resigned the following week. Following the announcement of Magill's resignation, Stefanik tweeted "One down. Two to go." During the hearing, when the MIT president denied hearing any calls for genocide, Stefanik claimed that chants of "intifada" - an Arabic word for a rebellion or uprising, or a resistance movement - are often considered as a "call for the genocide" of the Jewish people.

Following the congressional hearing, the House committee said it would launch an investigation into the learning environments and disciplinary policies at Harvard, Penn, and MIT over alleged antisemitism on their campuses. Stefanik further criticized Harvard's response to antisemitism by denouncing the appointment of Derek Penslar to the university's Antisemitism Task Force. Stefanik said that Penslar, a Jewish Studies professor who is a Jewish critic of Israel, was "known for his despicable antisemitic views." The hearing was portrayed in the cold open of the December 9 episode of Saturday Night Live, with Chloe Troast playing Stefanik. (Note: The role was originally given to former cast member Cecily Strong who played it during dress rehearsal. Strong reportedly said the sketch's content made her uncomfortable, giving Troast the opportunity to play the role instead.) The skit was criticized by conservatives and Jewish groups like the ADL for treating anti-Semitism as humorous.

Stefanik was awarded the Dr. Miriam and Sheldon Adelson Defender of Israel Award by the Zionist Organization of America.

==== Caucus memberships ====
- Congressional Arts Caucus
- Tuesday Group (2017–2019)
- Republican Main Street Partnership
- Republican Governance Group
- Climate Solutions Caucus

== Nomination as U.S. ambassador to the United Nations ==
In November 2024, CNN reported that President-elect Trump had offered Stefanik the position of United States ambassador to the United Nations. On November 10, Stefanik told the New York Post that she had been offered the position and had agreed to accept it. On November 11, Trump stated that he would nominate Stefanik to the U.N. ambassadorship.

Stefanik appeared before the Senate Committee on Foreign Relations on January 21, 2025. During the hearing, she vowed to fight antisemitism, support Israel and Taiwan, counter Chinese influence, and use American contributions as leverage to drive reforms when necessary.

During the Senate hearing, she faced criticism because, during her confirmation hearing for ambassador to the U.N., she was unable to answer whether Palestinian people have the right to self-determination.

Stefanik's approach to China centered on addressing its growing influence within U.N. agencies by strengthening alliances with traditional American partners, forging coalitions with smaller nations, and advocating for leadership and staffing roles in key agencies to counter China and its allies. She received bipartisan support for her plans to bolster U.S. leadership in the United Nations.

Stefanik criticized the United Nations Relief and Works Agency for Palestine Refugees in the Near East and called for stricter scrutiny of its funding, accusing the organization of being infiltrated by Hamas. Stefanik praised the World Food Program and UNICEF for being successful and effective agencies that have a positive global impact.

The committee advanced Stefanik's nomination in a 19–3 vote on January 30, 2025. Although observers believed that Stefanik was likely to secure Senate confirmation without difficulty, Senate Republicans delayed the confirmation process due to concerns about the narrow Republican majority in the House of Representatives. Prior to her withdrawal, Stefanik was expected to be confirmed after April 1, when two vacant House seats were expected to be won by Republican candidates in special elections on that date.

On March 27, 2025, President Trump put out a statement on Truth Social stating that he had withdrawn Stefanik's nomination due to the slim Republican majority margin in the House of Representatives. Trump stated that he personally asked Stefanik to remain in Congress, calling her "one of his biggest allies" and emphasizing the importance of holding onto every GOP seat. He also hinted that she could be considered for another position in his administration at a later date.

== Political positions ==
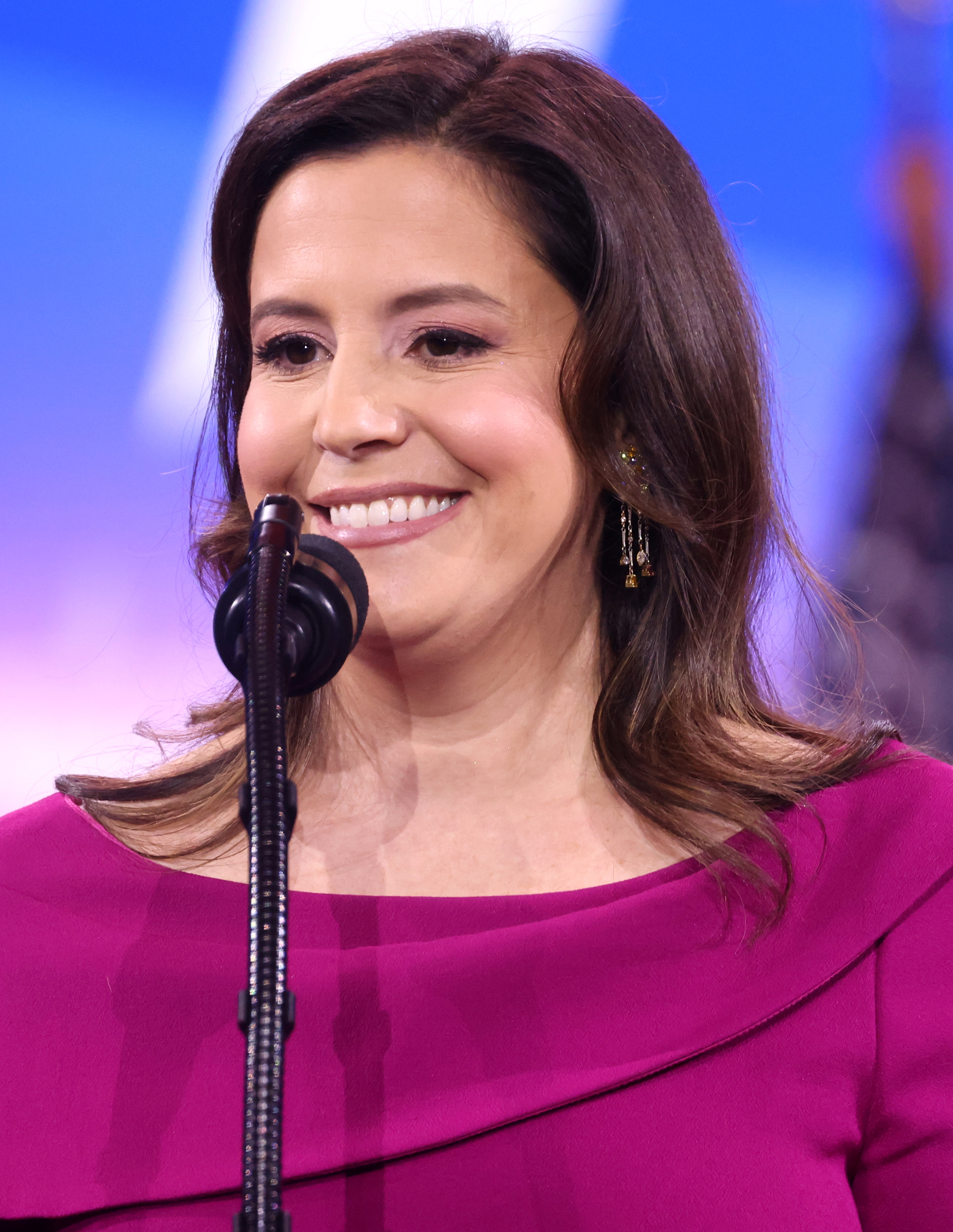
Stefanik at the 2025 Conservative Political Action Conference

Stefanik was ranked by the Bipartisan Index as the 19th-most bipartisan House member during the first session of the 115th United States Congress in 2019. During the 117th United States Congress, she was ranked as the 100th-most bipartisan member.

Stefanik was initially elected as a moderate conservative. During her House tenure, she has moved considerably towards the right. She aligned herself with President Donald Trump during his first term in office.

=== Family and gender ===
==== Abortion ====
Stefanik opposes abortion, but says the Republican Party should be more understanding of other positions on the issue. She opposes taxpayer funding for abortion, and supports requiring that health insurance plans disclose whether they cover it. She joined her party in supporting H.R. 36, the Pain-Capable Unborn Child Protection Act of 2017. She also supports legislation that would ban abortion after 15 weeks of pregnancy, with exceptions for rape, incest, or to protect the pregnant woman's life.

==== LGBTQ rights ====
In the 116th Congress, Stefanik was one of eight Republicans to vote for the Equality Act. Later in the same Congress, she introduced a bill, The Fairness for All Act, that would prohibit discrimination against LGBTQ people while also including exceptions for religious groups and small businesses with religious foundations. Stefanik voted against the Equality Act on February 25, 2021, despite having supported the same legislation during the previous Congress.

On July 19, 2022, Stefanik was one of the 47 Republican representatives who voted in favor of the Respect for Marriage Act, which codified the right to same-sex marriage in federal law.

In 2024, alongside former HUD secretary Ben Carson and anti-LGBTQ psychologist Miriam Grossman, Stefanik called for a nationwide ban on gender-affirming care for transgender youth and a ban on public schools using transgender students' preferred pronouns. This ban would be enforced by potential civil rights suits and the elimination of federal funding for noncompliant institutions. Stefanik described support for transgender children as part of a broader "anti-Western" ideology in American education. When the Saratoga Springs City School District in New York passed the "Affirming Our Support for Every Student" resolution, which allowed transgender students to play on sports teams matching their stated gender identity, Stefanik called for a federal investigation into the school district and said the Trump Administration could revoke their federal funding over the policy.

==== Women in politics ====
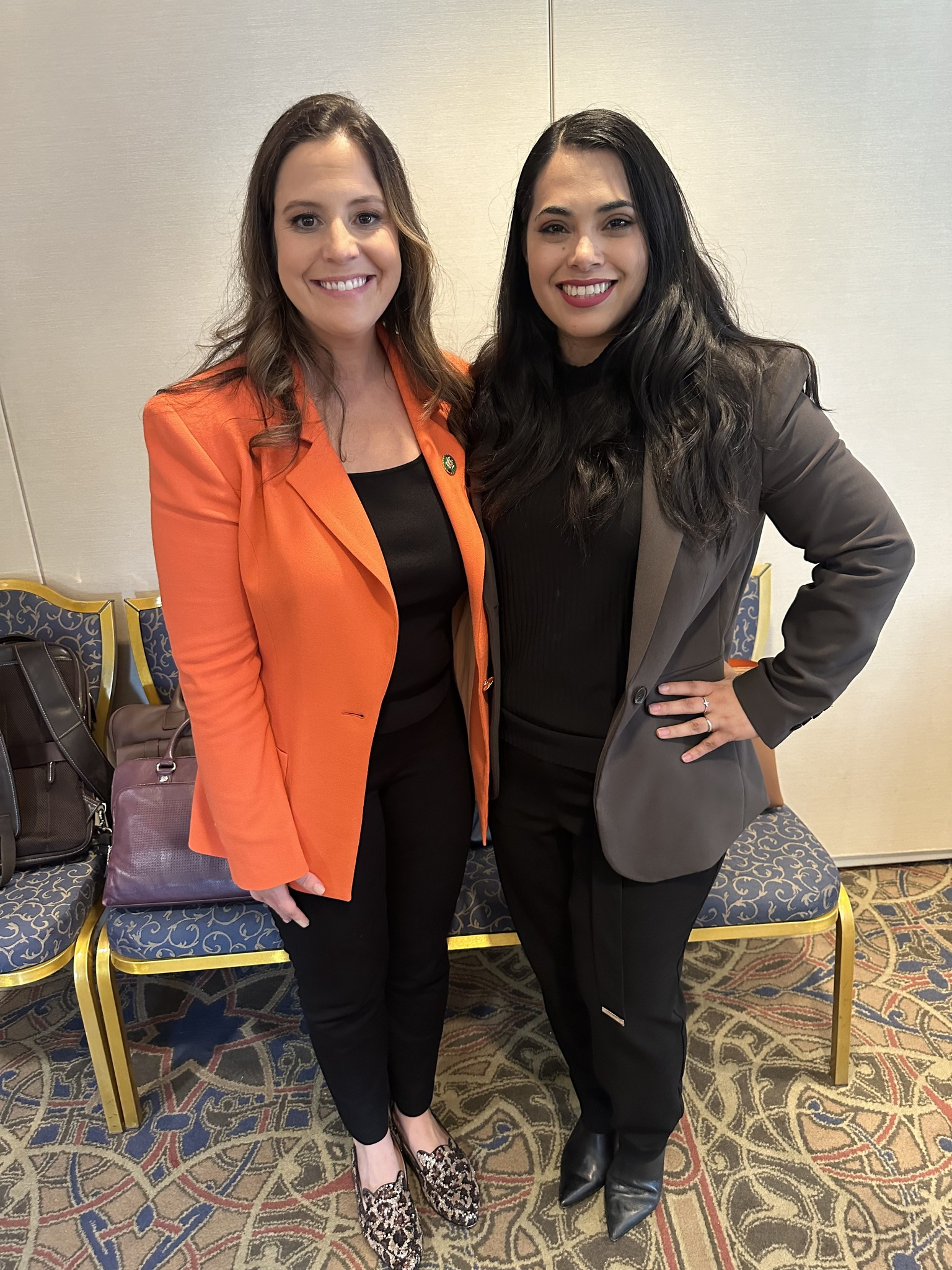
A 2023 photo of Stefanik with her former colleague, Mayra Flores. Stefanik endorsed Flores during the 2024 election cycle.

Stefanik has long advocated for empowering women in the Republican Party and has influenced the party's culture to prioritize electing more women. After her election in 2014, Stefanik named Facebook COO Sheryl Sandberg as a major influence on her decision to run for Congress.

=== Health care ===
On May 4, 2017, Stefanik voted on party lines in favor of repealing the Affordable Care Act and passing the House Republican-sponsored American Health Care Act of 2017.

Following a televised community forum in Plattsburgh four days later, at which many attendees opposed her vote and wanted to maintain Obamacare, Stefanik said she had been unfairly criticized for her vote for AHCA. She defended her vote in a post on Medium, "Setting the Record Straight on the American Health Care Act". Her claims about the effects of the AHCA were strongly disputed by fact checkers at the Glens Falls Post-Star, North Country Public Radio, and the Albany Times Union.

In 2017, Stefanik co-sponsored the Preserving Employee Wellness Programs Act in the 115th Congress—legislation that, among other things, would eliminate the genetic privacy protections of the Genetic Information Nondiscrimination Act and allow companies to require employees to undergo genetic testing or risk paying a penalty of thousands of dollars, and let employers see that genetic and other health information. The American Society of Human Genetics opposes the bill.

In November 2017, Stefanik voted for the Championing Healthy Kids Act, which would provide a five-year extension to the Children's Health Insurance Program.

==== COVID-19 vaccine ====
Stefanik opposes federal COVID-19 vaccine mandates for private employers. Along with approximately 170 other members of Congress, she signed an amicus brief to the Supreme Court arguing that Congress did not give the government authority to impose a vaccine mandate. On July 29, 2021, she tweeted: "FIRE FAUCI!"

=== Economy ===
Stefanik voted in favor of the Keystone Pipeline. She opposed the 2013 sequestration cuts to the federal U.S. military budget, citing its effect on Fort Drum just north of Watertown, New York, part of her district.

Stefanik voted against the Tax Cuts and Jobs Act of 2017, joining five other New York Republican representatives. Her primary reason for voting against the law was its changes to the state and local tax deduction "that so many in our district and across New York rely on". Stefanik also criticized "Albany's failed leadership and inability to rein in spending". She said, "New York is one of the highest taxed states in the country, and families here rely on this important deduction to make ends meet. Failure to maintain SALT (State and local tax deduction) could lead to more families leaving our region."

In March 2021, all House Republicans, including Stefanik, voted against the American Rescue Plan Act of 2021, a $1.9 trillion COVID-19 relief bill.

==== Taxes ====
On December 19, 2017, Stefanik voted against the Tax Cuts and Jobs Act. In a December 18 Facebook post, she wrote, "The final bill does not adequately protect the state and local tax deduction that so many in our district and across New York rely on ... New York is one of the highest taxed states in the country, and families here rely on this important deduction to make ends meet."

=== Environment ===
In 2017, Stefanik criticized Trump's decision to withdraw from the Paris climate agreement. She contended that the move was "misguided" and "harms the ongoing effort to fight climate change, while also isolating us from our allies". In January 2017, Stefanik joined the Bipartisan Climate Solutions Caucus, an apparent indication of "a moderate stance on climate change issues".

=== Foreign affairs ===
Stefanik is considered to be hawkish towards China, calling the country "the key challenge of the 21st century". She has proposed legislation to prohibit the Chinese drone manufacturer DJI from operating in the United States. Though she initially supported military aid to Ukraine when it came under invasion by Russia, she later voted against $60.8 billion aid bill.

==== Israel ====
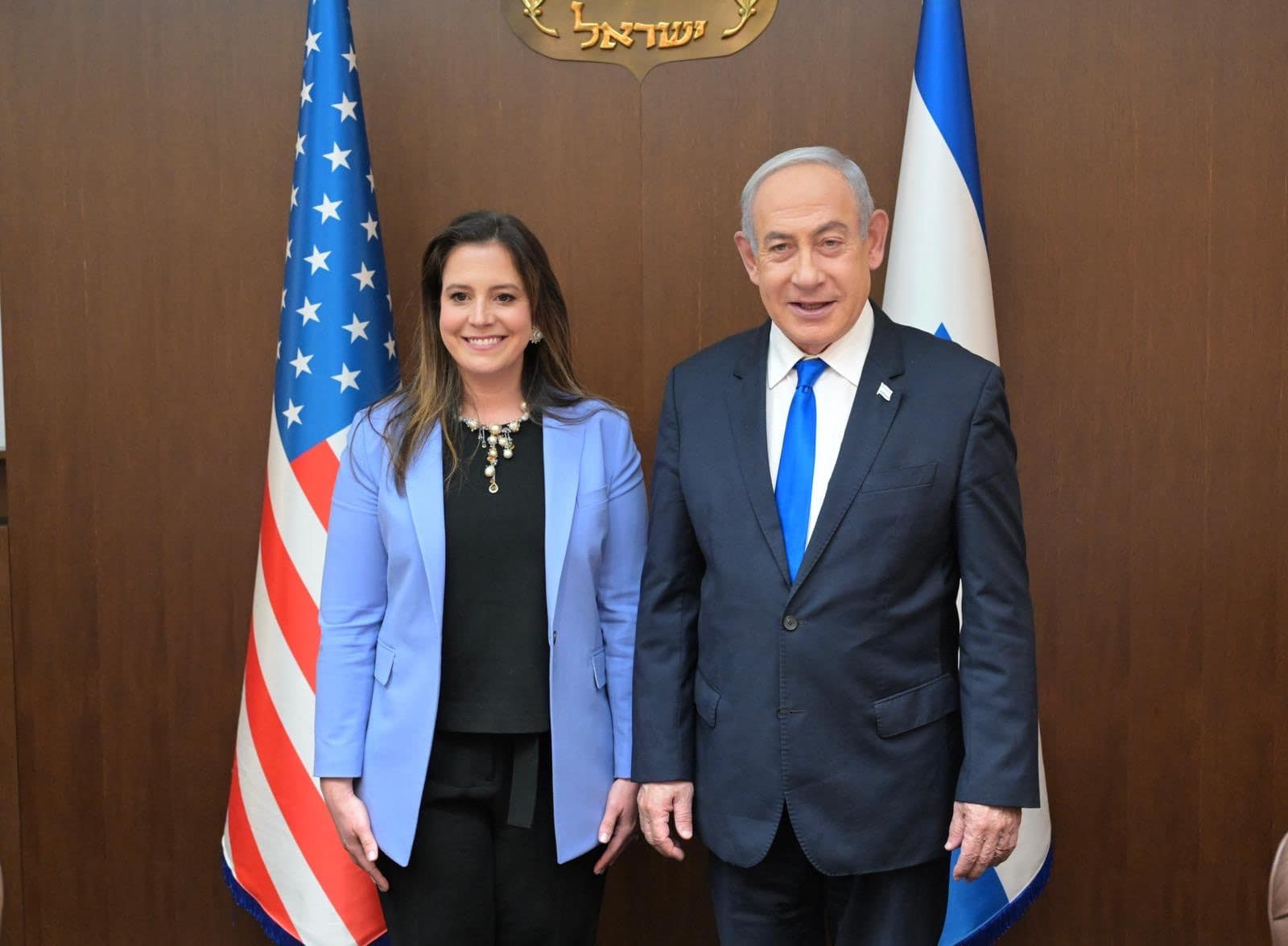
Stefanik with Israeli prime minister Benjamin Netanyahu in May 2024

Stefanik is strongly pro-Israel. In May 2024, she gave a speech at the Israeli Knesset, calling for "wiping" those responsible for the October 7 attacks "off the face of the Earth". She is sharply critical of the United Nations, accusing it of fostering "antisemitic rot". On March 18, 2024, while receiving the Defender of Israel Award at the Zionist Organization of America, she made the following statement, "Anyone that does not stand with our ally Israel, stands for their genocide." In September 2024, she criticized the United Nations's "extreme antisemitism and moral depravity" and has called on President Joe Biden to "unequivocally support Israel’s right to defend itself against both brutal terrorists and biased international organizations". In October 2024, she called for a "complete reassessment of US funding of the United Nations" after the Palestinian Authority attempted to expel Israel from the UN due to alleged human rights abuses in Gaza. She has supported the view that Israel has a "biblical right" to the occupied West Bank.

==== Defense ====
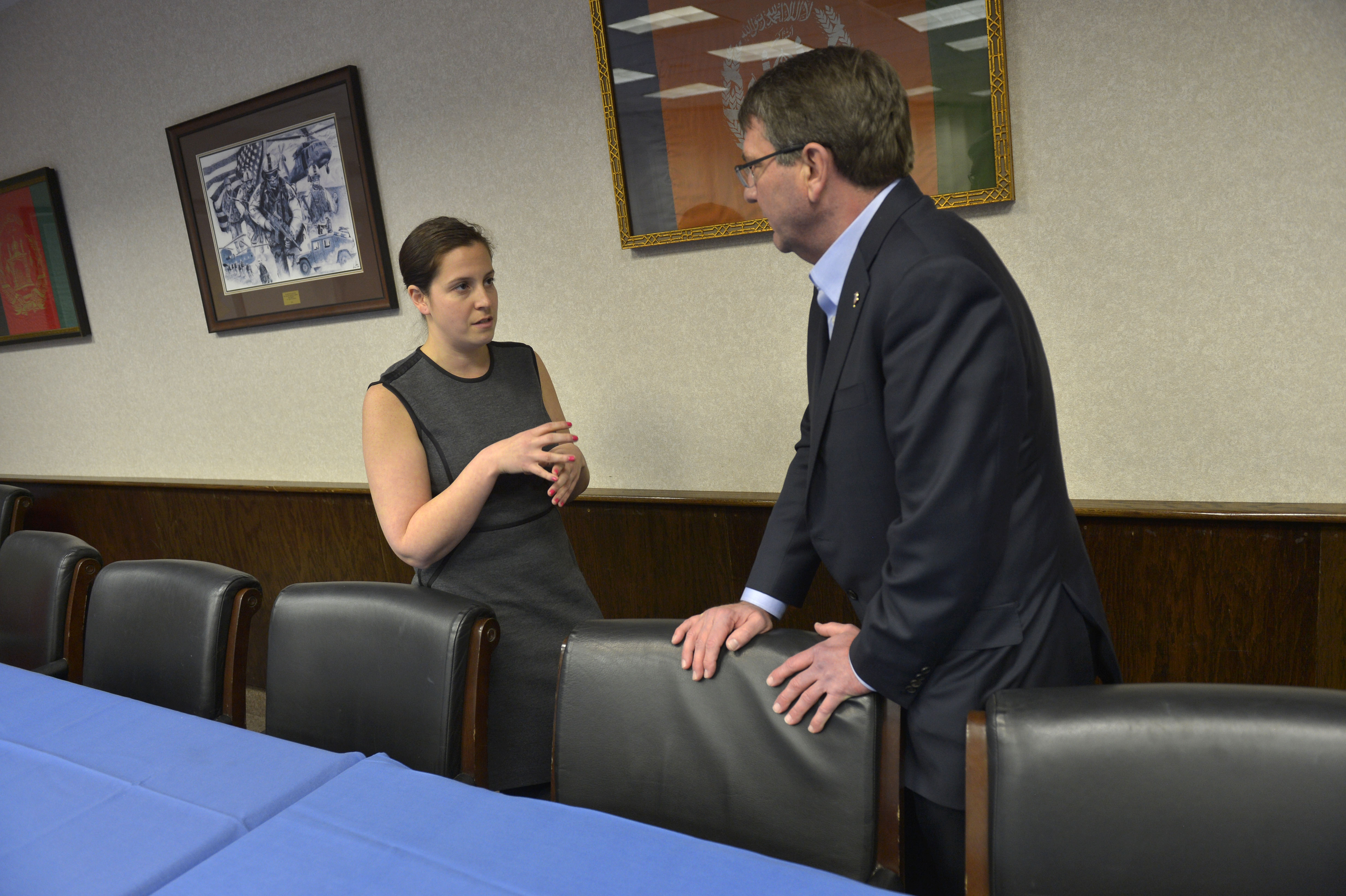
Stefanik with Defense Secretary Ash Carter in 2015

In a July 2015 Washington Times profile, Jacqueline Klimas noted that Stefanik was the only freshman on that year's conference committee for the defense policy bill, a position accorded to her "because of her extensive experience in foreign policy—working in the George W. Bush administration, prepping Rep. Paul Ryan for his vice presidential debates, and listening to commanders at Fort Drum in her home district". Jack Collens, a political science professor at Siena College, told Klimas that Stefanik's prize committee position signaled that party leaders wanted Stefanik to be part of "the next generation of Republican leaders".

==== Intelligence ====
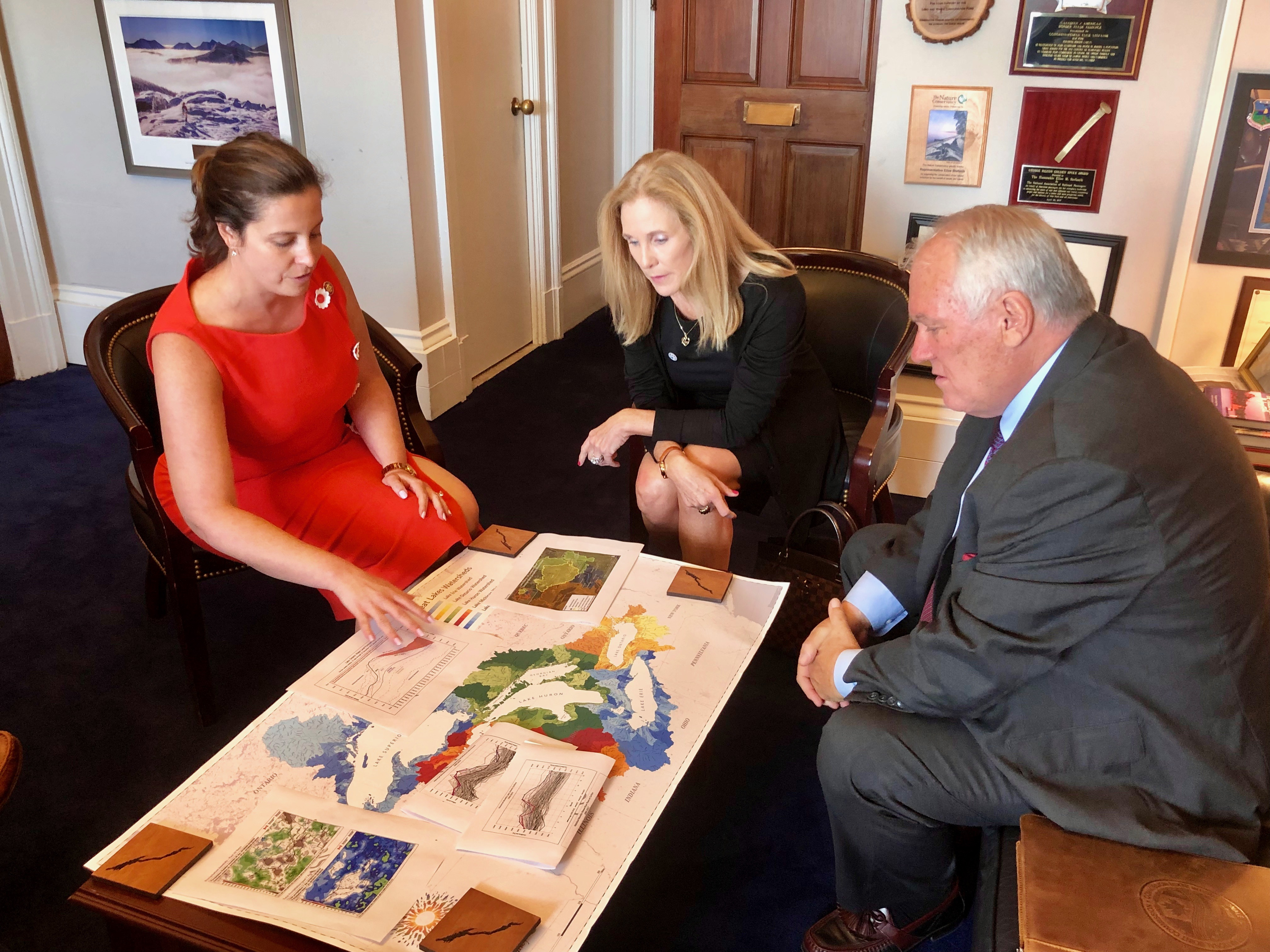
Stefanik with Jane Corwin and Lance Yohe of the International Joint Commission in July 2019

Stefanik voted to release the Nunes memo written by staff members of Representative Devin Nunes. Trump asserted that the memo discredited the investigation into Russian interference in the 2016 United States elections, but the Federal Bureau of Investigation asserted: "material omissions of fact ... fundamentally impact the memo's accuracy."

Stefanik supported ending the House Intelligence Committee's investigation into Russian interference in the 2016 United States elections over the objections of Committee Democrats.

=== Immigration ===
Stefanik opposed Trump's 2017 executive order imposing a temporary ban on travel and immigration to the United States by nationals of seven Muslim-majority countries.

Stefanik declined to condemn the Trump administration family separation policy, instead publishing a press release congratulating Trump after he signed an Executive Order to suspend new separations and detain families.

On March 26, 2019, Stefanik was one of 14 Republicans to vote with all House Democrats to override Trump's veto of a measure unwinding the latter's declaration of a national emergency at the southern border.

Although she had previously supported DACA, Stefanik voted against the DREAM Act in 2021.

In 2021, Stefanik was one of 30 Republicans who voted for the Farm Workforce Modernization Act, which would grant legal status to illegal immigrants working in agriculture and establish a pathway to permanent residency contingent on continued farm work.

During the 2022 United States infant formula shortage, Stefanik criticized the Biden administration for supplying baby formula to undocumented immigrants, claiming that Biden was prioritizing immigrants over American citizens. Stefanik accused the Democrats of collaborating with "pedo grifters" in implementing this policy. Stefanik's office later stated she was referencing sexual misconduct allegations against one of the founders of The Lincoln Project. Stefanik has further claimed in a Facebook campaign advertisement in 2021 that Democrats were orchestrating a "permanent election insurrection" by granting amnesty to undocumented immigrants in order to "overthrow our current electorate and create a permanent liberal majority in Washington". After the 2022 Buffalo shooting, this advertisement received renewed criticism. Congressman Adam Kinzinger cited Stefanik's advertisement as proof for his accusation that Stefanik had promoted the white nationalist replacement theory, a theory which the Buffalo shooter believed. An adviser to Stefanik denied the accusation, calling it a "new disgusting low for the Left, their Never Trump allies, and the sycophant stenographers in the media".

=== Net neutrality ===
After the Federal Communications Commission decided to repeal Obama-era net neutrality in December 2017, Stefanik urged her congressional colleagues to pass legislation restoring the policy.

=== Cybersecurity ===
In September 2018, Stefanik, Seth Moulton and Dan Donovan co-sponsored the Cyber Ready Workforce Act advanced by Jacky Rosen. The legislation would create a grant program within the Department of Labor to "create, implement, and expand registered apprenticeships" in cybersecurity. It aims to offer certifications and connect participants with businesses, in order to "boost the number" of workers for federal jobs in that field.

=== Voting rights ===
Stefanik opposes the For the People Act. She made a false claim that the legislation would "prevent removal of ineligible voters from registration rolls". Both FactCheck.org and PolitiFact rated Stefanik's claim "False", with PolitiFact stating, "No section of the bill prevents an election official from removing an ineligible person on the voting rolls."

=== Political figures ===
==== Donald Trump ====
Stefanik became increasingly supportive of Donald Trump's candidacy for president after he won the 2016 Republican Party presidential primary. Stefanik said that Trump's crude remarks in the Access Hollywood tape were "wrong", but continued to endorse him.

An analysis by FiveThirtyEight in early 2017 found Stefanik supporting Trump's position in 77.7% of House votes from the 115th to the 117th Congress. Stefanik has been described as a Trump loyalist.

In May 2021, Stefanik called Trump the "strongest supporter of any president when it comes to standing up for the Constitution".

==== First Trump impeachment ====
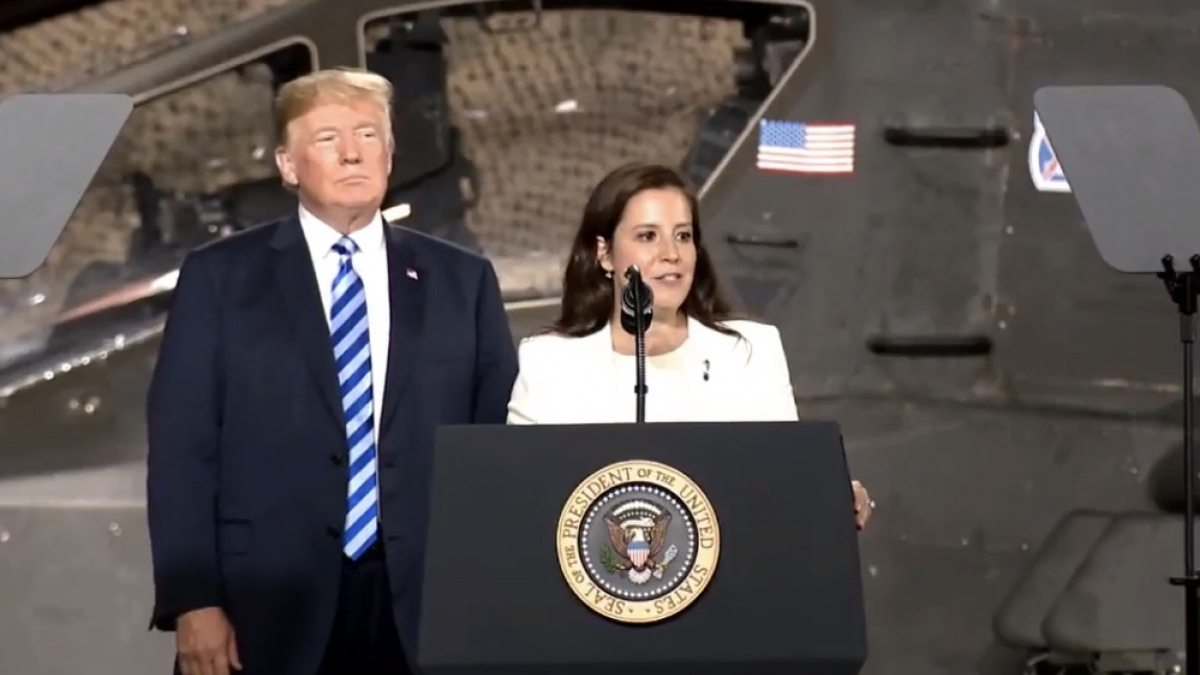
Stefanik and President Donald Trump at Fort Drum in August 2018

On September 25, 2019, Stefanik announced that she did not support the impeachment of President Trump. During the November 2019 hearings, in which Congress gathered evidence and heard witness testimony in relation to the impeachment inquiry, Stefanik emerged as a key defender of Trump. During a November 15 hearing, intelligence committee ranking member Devin Nunes attempted to yield part of his allotted witness questioning time to Stefanik, but was ruled out of order by committee chairman Adam Schiff. Stefanik accused Schiff of "making up the rules as he goes" and of preventing Republican committee members from controlling their time to question witnesses. Nunes and Stefanik were violating the procedural rules that were established by an October House vote, and Schiff cited the rule to them. The rule Schiff cited authorized only Schiff and Nunes, or their counsels, to ask questions during the first 45 minutes of each party's questions for witnesses. The incident created a controversy in which Stefanik and others, including Trump, accused Schiff of "gagging" her. The Washington Post and other sources characterized the incident as a "stunt" to portray Schiff as unfair.

==== 2020 election fraud conspiracy theories ====
After Joe Biden won the 2020 presidential election and Trump refused to concede while making false claims of fraud, Stefanik aided Trump in his efforts to overturn the election results. She also made false claims of fraud, saying among other things that "more than 140,000 votes came from underage, deceased, and otherwise unauthorized voters" in Fulton County, Georgia. She also expressed "concerns" about Dominion Voting Systems, the subject of numerous false right-wing conspiracy theories. In December 2020, Stefanik supported the lawsuit Texas v. Pennsylvania, an attempt to reverse Trump's loss by petitioning the U.S. Supreme Court to reject certified results in Michigan, Pennsylvania, Wisconsin and Georgia. After a mob of pro-Trump supporters stormed the U.S. Capitol on January 6, 2021, Stefanik condemned the violence but rejected the idea that Trump was at fault. She has promoted conspiracy theories about a "stolen election", and just hours after the "invasion" of the Capitol, she voted against accepting Pennsylvania's electoral votes in the 2020 election. Later in January, she expressed opposition to impeaching Trump over his alleged role in inciting the storming of the Capitol. She voted against the second impeachment on January 13.

In December 2020, one month after the 2020 United States presidential election, Stefanik, in an interview with Newsmax, appeared to support Newsmax's baseless claim that Dominion Voting Systems had helped Joe Biden "steal" the election from Donald Trump. Newsmax had been promoting the theory but later issued a retraction after reaching a legal settlement with Dominion. Stefanik continued to make unsubstantiated claims about election fraud in public statements.

In December 2020, Stefanik joined over 100 GOP House members in an amicus brief asking the U.S. Supreme Court to overturn the 2020 election.

She backed Trump's attempts to overturn the 2020 United States presidential election, objecting to Pennsylvania's electoral votes after Trump supporters were involved in the 2021 United States Capitol attack. As the U.S. House Select Committee on the January 6 Attack began to investigate, Stefanik said that Speaker Nancy Pelosi was responsible. Stefanik claimed without evidence that Pelosi was "aware of potential security threats to the Capitol and she failed to act".

==== Effort to expunge Trump's impeachments ====
Stefanik has forwarded the idea of "expunging" both of Trump's impeachments.

In 2022, Republican congressman Markwayne Mullin introduced resolutions to remove Trump's impeachments from the Congressional Record. This received support from Stefanik. On June 22, 2023, Stefanik and Congresswoman Marjorie Taylor Greene introduced a pair of resolutions to expunge Trump's impeachments. The next day, Republican Speaker of the House Kevin McCarthy lent his support to the resolutions.

==== Zohran Mamdani ====
Following the victory of Zohran Mamdani in the 2025 New York City Democratic mayoral primary, Stefanik responded with condemnations of Mamdani, calling him a "Hamas Terrorist sympathizer" and an "antisemitic, jihadist, Communist candidate." Stefanik blamed New York governor Kathy Hochul for Mamdani's victory, writing to Hochul that “You own this dangerous insanity and are incapable of defeating it.” In October 2025, Stefanik again attacked Mamdani, saying that he is “a full-blown jihadist who has called for the genocide of Jews."

==== Other ====
During the 2022 election cycle, Stefanik was a strong early supporter of George Santos's campaign for U.S. representative from New York's 3rd district, on Long Island. She endorsed him in August 2021, lent him a staffer who played a major role in his campaign, and held a fundraiser for him in May 2022 that raised over $100,000. After Santos won the election, The New York Times and other media outlets reported that he had greatly misrepresented much of his background, including employers and schools he had no connection with, as well as aspects of his family history and ethnic background; in addition, there were personal details he had not shared, such as an active criminal case against him in Brazil. In December 2023, Stefanik voted against expelling Santos from the House of Representatives, saying his expulsion would set "a dangerous precedent, and I am voting no based upon my concerns regarding due process." Santos was expelled from the House by a vote of 311–114.

In 2022, Stefanik endorsed Carl Paladino in the election to succeed retiring U.S. representative Chris Jacobs in New York's 23rd congressional district. Stefanik reportedly had a history of disputes with Paladino's rival in the Republican primary, then-New York Republican State Committee chair Nick Langworthy. Paladino made comments on a radio show in 2021 praising Adolf Hitler, saying he was "the kind of leader we need today". Stefanik condemned Paladino's remarks when asked about them by HuffPost but did not withdraw her endorsement. After Paladino called for the execution of Attorney General Merrick Garland, former Republican congresswoman Mia Love called upon Stefanik to rescind her endorsement of Paladino. Stefanik actively campaigned for Paladino, hosting a tele-rally for him the night before the primary. Paladino lost the primary to Langworthy.

Stefanik is a member of the New York Young Republican Club (NYYRC), an organization connected to white nationalists and other far-right figures. In 2025, Stefanik accepted an award from the New York State Young Republicans, and praised Peter Giunta, the chair of the organization, for his "tremendous leadership." Stefanik endorsed Giunta's failed bid to lead the Young Republican National Federation. After Politico published an investigation which revealed Giunta had participated in a racist Telegram chat with other young Republicans in which Giunta wrote "I love Hitler", Stefanik called the chat "absolutely appalling" and called for all Republican officials involved in the chat to resign. However, she also attacked the article in Politico as a "hit piece", saying that Democrats had failed to condemn Jay Jones for his texting scandal in contrast with Republican condemnation of the Telegram chat.

== Electoral history ==
New York's 21st congressional district
Year	Republican	Votes	Pct	Democrat	Votes	Pct	Green	Votes	Pct	Ref.
2014	Elise Stefanik	96,226	55.1%	Aaron G. Woolf	59,063	33.8%	Matthew J. Funiciello	19,238	11%	
2016	Elise Stefanik (incumbent)	177,886	65.3%	Mike Derrick	82,161	30.1%	Matthew J. Funiciello	12,452	4.6%	
2018	Elise Stefanik (incumbent)	131,981	56.1%	Tedra Cobb	99,791	42.4%	Lynn Kahn	3,437	1.5%	
2020	Elise Stefanik (incumbent)	188,655	58.8%	Tedra Cobb	131,995	41.2%				
2022	Elise Stefanik (incumbent)	168,579	59.1%	Matt Castelli	116,421	40.8%				
2024	Elise Stefanik (incumbent)	216,513	62.1%	Paula Collins	131,930	37.9%				

== Personal life ==
Stefanik is a Roman Catholic.

After the 2012 election, Stefanik bought a home in Willsboro, New York, near Plattsburgh. Her parents had owned a vacation home in Willsboro for many years. Her father's family are Galician Poles and she keeps the Polish Christmas Eve traditions.

On August 19, 2017, in Saratoga Springs, New York, Stefanik married Matthew Manda, who works in marketing and communications. In December 2018, Stefanik and Manda moved to nearby Schuylerville. As of 2022, Manda works as the manager of public affairs for the National Shooting Sports Foundation, a trade association for firearms manufacturers. Together they have one child.

== See also ==
- List of Harvard University politicians
- Women in the United States House of Representatives
- List of United States representatives from New York

== Notes ==
U.S. House of Representatives
Preceded by Bill Owens	Member of the U.S. House of Representatives from New York's 21st congressional district 2015–present	Incumbent
Honorary titles
Preceded by Patrick Murphy	Baby of the House; 2015–2019	Succeeded by Alexandria Ocasio-Cortez
Party political offices
Preceded by Charlie Dent; Bob Dold; Adam Kinzinger	Chair of the Tuesday Group; 2017–2019; Served alongside: Tom MacArthur (2017), Charlie Dent (2017–2018), John Katko (2017–2019)	Succeeded by Susan Brooks; John Katko; Fred Upton
Preceded by Liz Cheney	Chair of the House Republican Conference; 2021–2025	Succeeded by Lisa McClain
Vacant Title last held by Garret Graves; 2023 as Chair of the House Republican Elected Leadership Committee	Chair of House Republican Leadership; 2025–present	Incumbent
U.S. order of precedence (ceremonial)
Preceded by David Rouzer	United States representatives by seniority 144th	Succeeded by Norma Torres
