= Jennifer Mann =

American politician

Jennifer L. Mann

Member of the Pennsylvania House of Representatives from the 132nd district
- In office January 5, 1999 – January 1, 2013
- Preceded by: Charlie Dent
- Succeeded by: Michael Schlossberg

Personal details
- Born: May 17, 1969 (age 57) Allentown, Pennsylvania, U.S.
- Party: Democratic
- Education: Lehigh University (BA)

Jennifer L. Mann (born May 17, 1969) is an American businesswoman and former Democratic member of the Pennsylvania House of Representatives for the 132nd District, having served from 1999 to 2013.

== Early life and education ==
Jennifer L. Mann was born in Allentown, Pennsylvania, on May 17, 1969. She attended and graduated from William Allen High School in Allentown in 1987. She then attended and graduated from Lehigh University in Bethlehem, Pennsylvania, with a BA in economics and government in 1991.

== Career ==
Mann owned and operated a wireless communications firm and served on Lehigh County's Democratic Committee before seeking elected office in 1998, when she ran for the Pennsylvania House of Representatives, seeking the seat vacated by Charlie Dent when Dent ran for the Pennsylvania State Senate. Mann defeated Emma Tropiano in the Democratic primary and then Republican Allentown City Councilman and former Lehigh County executive David Bausch in the general election. She is the first Democrat to represent the Pennsylvania House of Representatives, District 132 since Jack Pressman in 1990.

In 2005, she ran for the Pennsylvania State Senate in a special election seeking to fill the vacancy following Dent's election to Congress. Mann lost the race to then State Representative Pat Browne. Three years later, in 2008, Mann sought the Democratic nomination Pennsylvania Treasurer. She lost that race to Robert McCord.

== Legislative career ==
During her tenure in the state legislature, Mann served on the House Finance, Environmental Resources and the Energy, Consumer Affairs, Insurance and Transportation Committees. She was co-chair of the New Democrat Coalition, the Community College Caucus, the Arthritis Caucus, and served on the House Rules Committee. In 2003, the political website PoliticsPA named her as a possible successor to House Minority Leader Bill DeWeese. Mann served in Pennsylvania House leadership as Majority Caucus Secretary. She is the third woman to have served in a House Democratic leadership position since the Pennsylvania legislature was formed.

In 2012, Mann opted not to seek reelection and reentered the private sector, starting a consulting firm based in Allentown. She was succeeded in representing the district by Democrat Michael Schlossberg.
