= Samuel Frank =

American politician

Samuel W. Frank

Member of the Pennsylvania House of Representatives from the 132nd district
- In office January 7, 1969 – April 17, 1973
- Preceded by: District created
- Succeeded by: Kurt Zwickl

Member of the Pennsylvania House of Representatives from the Lehigh County district
- In office 1955–1968

Personal details
- Born: May 30, 1904 Wilkes Barre, Pennsylvania, U.S.
- Died: April 17, 1973 (aged 68)
- Party: Democratic

Samuel W. Frank (May 30, 1904 – April 17, 1973) was an American politician and Democratic member of the Pennsylvania House of Representatives.

== Formative years ==
Born on May 30, 1904, in Wilkes Barre, Pennsylvania, Samuel W. Frank was the owner of the Frank Trouser Co. and a district manager for Sears, Roebuck & Co.

== Political and public service ==
A Democrat, Frank served as president of the Allentown Recreation Commission from 1950 to 1970, and as State Democratic Committeeman for Lehigh County from 1952 to 1954. Elected to the Pennsylvania House of Representatives for its 1955 and 1957 terms, he was unsuccessful in reelection campaigns during 1956, 1960, and 1962, but was reelected to the House for its 1965 term. He then served four consecutive terms, but did not complete his final term.

== Death and interment ==
A sitting member of the Pennsylvania House, Frank died in Allentown, Pennsylvania, on April 17, 1973.
