= Republican Governance Group =

Informal American congressional caucus

- Chair: David Valadao (CA–22)
- Founded: 1995; 31 years ago
- Preceded by: Wednesday Group (1961–2001); Tuesday Lunch Bunch (1995–1997); Tuesday Group (1997–2020)
- Ideology: Moderate conservatism Fiscal conservatism
- Political position: Center-right; Historical: Center to center-right
- National affiliation: Republican Party
- Seats in House Republican Conference: 46 / 219 (Note: This figure does not include Amata Coleman Radewagen, a non-voting Delegate who is a member of the caucus.)
- Seats in the House: 46 / 435

Website
- Campaign website

The Republican Governance Group, originally the Tuesday Lunch Bunch and then the Tuesday Group until 2020, is a group of moderate Republicans in the United States House of Representatives. It was founded in 1994 in the wake of the Republican takeover of the House; the Republican House caucus came to be dominated by conservatives. It has historically been considered a center to center-right congressional caucus, with its members primarily from competitive House districts. In 2025, Roll Call wrote, "the group is less united from a singular political vision than a determination to shape legislation that’s rooted in pragmatism".

In 2007, the Tuesday Group founded its own political action committee. The name of the PAC was "Tuesday Group Political Action Committee" but has since changed to "Republican Governance Group/Tuesday Group Political Action Committee". It is based in Tampa, Florida.

Another major group of Republican moderates in Congress is the Republican Main Street Caucus, which existed briefly from 2017 to 2019 and was re-formed in 2021.

== Wednesday Group ==
Its predecessor, the Wednesday Group, was first founded in the House between 1961 and 1963 and then in the Senate around 1969.

=== Wednesday Group membership ===
- George Aiken (VT)
- John Anderson (IL)
- Mark Andrews (ND)
- Glenn Beall (MD)
- Alphonzo Bell (CA)
- Doug Bereuter (NE)
- Edward Biester (PA)
- Caleb Boggs (DE)
- Edward Brooke (MA)
- Caldwell Butler (VA) – House chair
- William Cahill (NJ)
- Clifford Case (NJ)
- John Chafee (RI)
- Lincoln Chafee (RI)
- Rod Chandler (WA)
- Dick Cheney (WY)
- Bill Clinger (PA) – House chair (1981–1987/1991)
- Thad Cochran (MS)
- Marlow Cook (KY) – Senate founding chair
- John Cooper (KY)
- Bill Cohen (ME)
- Barber Conable (NY)
- Sil Conte (MA)
- Larry Coughlin (PA)
- Jim Coyne (PA)
- Tom Curtis (MO)
- Jack Danforth (MO)
- Tom Delay (TX)
- John Dellenback (OR)
- Robert Ellsworth (KS)
- Marvin Esch (MI)
- Paul Findley (IL)
- Hamilton Fish IV (NY)
- Peter Frelinghuysen (NJ)
- Bill Frenzel (MN)
- Charles Goodell (NY)
- Slade Gorton (WA)
- Bill Gradison (OH) – House chair (1991–1993)
- Fred Grandy (IA)
- Bill Green (NY)
- Gil Gude (MD)
- Orval Hansen (ID)
- James Harvey (IL)
- Mark Hatfield (OR)
- Margaret Heckler (MA)
- John Heinz (PA)
- Paul Henry (MI)
- Bud Hillis (IN)
- Dave Hobson (OH)
- Amo Houghton (NY)
- Andy Ireland (FL)
- Jacob Javits (NY)
- Jim Jeffords (VT)
- Nancy Johnson (CT)
- Nancy Kassebaum (KS)
- Jim Kolbe (AZ) – House chair (1993–2001)
- Jim Leach (IA)
- John Lindsay (NY)
- Bob Livingston (LA)
- William Mailliard (CA)
- Richard Mallary (VT)
- Lynn Martin (IL)
- Mac Mathias (MD)
- Joe McDade (PA)
- Jock McKernan (ME)
- Stew McKinney (CT)
- Pete McCloskey (CA)
- Chester Mize (KS)
- Sid Morrison (WA)
- Brad Morse (CA) – House founding chair (1961–1972)
- Charles Mosher (OH)
- Bob Packwood (OR)
- James Pearson (KS)
- Charles Percy (IL)
- Tom Petri (WI)
- Joel Pritchard (WA) – House chair (1977–1980)
- Carl Pursell (MI)
- Al Quie (MN)
- Jim Ramstad (MN)
- Ralph Regula (OH)
- Tom Railsback (IL)
- Ogden Reid (NY)
- Tom Ridge (PA)
- Howard W. Robison (NY)
- Marge Roukema (NJ)
- Ronald Sarasin (CT)
- Hal Sawyer (MI)
- Bill Saxbe (OH)
- Herman Schneebeli (PA)
- Richard Schweiker (PA)
- Fred Schwengel (IA)
- Hugh Scott (PA)
- Clay Shaw (FL)
- Garner Shriver (KS)
- Abner Sibal (CT)
- Lamar Smith (TX)
- Peter Smith (VT)
- Olympia Snowe (ME)
- Arlen Specter (PA)
- Bob Stafford (VT)
- William Stanton (OH)
- Alan Steelman (TX)
- Ted Stevens (AK)
- Robert Taft (OH)
- Bill Thomas (CA)
- Craig Thomas (WY)
- Charley Thone (NE)
- Stan Tupper (ME)
- Fred Upton (MI)
- Vin Weber (MN) – House chair (1991–1992)
- Lowell Weicker (CT)
- Chuck Whalen (OH)
- Bill Whitehurst (VA)

== Membership ==
The caucus and its predecessors have never published membership lists, unlike the associated PAC, which openly presents its roster of congressional members. Most (but not all) are from competitive House districts.

Republican Governance Group in the 119th United States Congress

=== Leadership ===
Start	End	Chair(s)	State	Ref.
January 3, 1995	January 3, 2005	Mike Castle	DE	
January 3, 1995	January 3, 2005	Nancy Johnson	CT	
January 3, 1995	January 3, 2005	Fred Upton	MI	
January 3, 2005	January 3, 2007	Charlie Bass	NH	
January 3, 2005	January 3, 2007	Mark Kirk	IL	
January 3, 2007	June 15, 2010	Charlie Dent	PA	
January 3, 2007	June 15, 2010	Mark Kirk	IL	
June 15, 2010	November 29, 2010	Charlie Dent	PA	
June 15, 2010	November 29, 2010	Jo Ann Emerson	MO	
June 15, 2010	November 29, 2010	Mark Kirk	IL	
November 29, 2010	January 3, 2013	Charlie Dent	PA	
November 29, 2010	January 3, 2013	Jo Ann Emerson	MO	
January 3, 2013	January 3, 2015	Charlie Dent	PA	
January 3, 2013	January 3, 2015	Adam Kinzinger	IL	
January 3, 2013	January 3, 2015	Erik Paulsen	MN	
January 3, 2015	January 3, 2017	Charlie Dent	PA	
January 3, 2015	January 3, 2017	Bob Dold	IL	
January 3, 2015	January 3, 2017	Adam Kinzinger	IL	
January 3, 2017	May 23, 2017	Charlie Dent	PA	
January 3, 2017	May 23, 2017	Tom MacArthur	NJ	
January 3, 2017	May 23, 2017	Elise Stefanik	NY	
May 23, 2017	November 7, 2017	Charlie Dent	PA	
May 23, 2017	November 7, 2017	Elise Stefanik	NY	
November 7, 2017	May 12, 2018	Charlie Dent	PA	
November 7, 2017	May 12, 2018	John Katko	NY	
November 7, 2017	May 12, 2018	Elise Stefanik	NY	
May 12, 2018	January 3, 2019	John Katko	NY	
May 12, 2018	January 3, 2019	Elise Stefanik	NY	
January 3, 2019	January 3, 2021	Susan Brooks	IN	
January 3, 2019	January 3, 2021	John Katko	NY	
January 3, 2019	January 3, 2021	Fred Upton	MI	
January 3, 2021	August 3, 2022	John Katko	NY	
August 3, 2022	January 3, 2025	Dave Joyce	OH	
January 3, 2025	January 3, 2027	David Valadao	CA	
January 3, 2027	Designate	Nick LaLota	NY	

=== Current members ===
American Samoa
- Amata Coleman Radewagen (AS-AL)

Arizona

- Juan Ciscomani (AZ-6)

Arkansas

- Steve Womack (AR-3)

California

- Kevin Kiley (CA-3) (Independent)
- David Valadao (CA-22)
- Jay Obernolte (CA-23)
- Young Kim (CA-40)
- Ken Calvert (CA-41)

Colorado

- Jeff Hurd (CO-3)
- Gabe Evans (CO-8)

Florida

- John Rutherford (FL-5)
- Laurel Lee (FL-15)
- Mario Díaz-Balart (FL-26)
- María Elvira Salazar (FL-27)
- Carlos A. Giménez (FL-28)

Georgia

- Buddy Carter (GA-1) (Retiring at the end of the 119th Congress)
- Rich McCormick (GA-7)

Illinois

- Mike Bost (IL-12)

Indiana

- Mark Messmer (IN-8)

Iowa

- Mariannette Miller-Meeks (IA-1)

Louisiana

- Julia Letlow (LA-5) (Retiring at the end of the 119th Congress)

Minnesota

- Pete Stauber (MN-8)

Nebraska

- Don Bacon (NE-2) (Retiring at the end of the 119th Congress)

New Jersey

- Tom Kean Jr. (NJ-7)

Nevada

- Mark Amodei (NV-2) (Retiring at the end of the 119th Congress)

New York

- Nick LaLota (NY-1)
- Andrew Garbarino (NY-2)
- Nicole Malliotakis (NY-11)
- Mike Lawler (NY-17)
- Elise Stefanik (NY-21) (Retiring at the end of the 119th Congress)

North Carolina

- Chuck Edwards (NC-11) (Retiring at the end of the 119th Congress)

North Dakota

- Julie Fedorchak (ND-AL)

Ohio

- Mike Turner (OH-10)
- Troy Balderson (OH-12)
- Dave Joyce (OH-14)
- Michael Rulli (OH-6)

Oregon

- Cliff Bentz (OR-2)

Pennsylvania

- Brian Fitzpatrick (PA-1)
- Rob Bresnahan (PA-8)
- Glenn Thompson (PA-15)

Texas

- Beth Van Duyne (TX-24)

Virginia

- Rob Wittman (VA-1)
- Jennifer Kiggans (VA-2)

Utah

- Blake Moore (UT-1)

Washington

- Dan Newhouse (WA-4) (Retiring at the end of the 119th Congress)
- Michael Baumgartner (WA-5)

Wisconsin

- Bryan Steil (WI-1)

=== Former members ===
- Bill Johnson (OH)
- Roscoe Bartlett (MD)
- Charlie Bass (NH)
- Judy Biggert (IL)
- Mike Gallagher (WI)
- Sherwood Boehlert (NY)
- Mary Bono (CA)
- Jeb Bradley (NH)
- Susan Brooks (IN)
- Ginny Brown-Waite (FL)
- Tom Campbell (CA)
- Eric Cantor (VA)
- Joseph Cao (LA)
- Mike Castle (DE)
- Chris Collins (NY)
- Mike Coffman (CO)
- Carlos Curbelo (FL)
- Barbara Comstock (VA)
- Paul Cook (CA)
- Ryan Costello (PA)
- Tom Davis (VA)
- Jeff Denham (CA)
- Charlie Dent (PA)
- Charles Djou (HI)
- Bob Dold (IL)
- Dan Donovan (NY)
- Sean Duffy (WI)
- Vern Ehlers (MI)
- Renee Ellmers (NC)
- Phil English (PA)
- John Faso (NY)
- Mike Fitzpatrick (PA)
- Mark Foley (FL)
- Rodney Frelinghuysen (NJ)
- Jim Gerlach (PA)
- Chris Gibson (NY)
- Wayne Gilchrest (MD)
- Paul Gillmor (OH)
- James C. Greenwood (PA)
- Fred Grandy (IA)
- Michael Grimm (NY)
- Steve Gunderson (WI)
- Gil Gutknecht (MN)
- Richard Hanna (NY)
- Nan Hayworth (NY)
- Dave Hobson (OH)
- Amo Houghton (NY)
- Lynn Jenkins (KS)
- Nancy Johnson (CT)
- Tim Johnson (IL)
- David Jolly (FL)
- Ric Keller (FL)
- Sue Kelly (NY)
- Pete King (NY)
- Mark Kirk (IL)
- Jim Kolbe (AZ)
- Randy Kuhl (NY)
- Ray LaHood (IL)
- Leonard Lance (NJ)
- Steve LaTourette (OH)
- Rick Lazio (NY)
- Jim Leach (IA)
- Chris Lee (NY)
- Frank LoBiondo (NJ)
- Tom MacArthur (NJ)
- John McKernan (ME)
- Thad McCotter (TX)
- Martha McSally (AZ)
- Pat Meehan (PA)
- Candice Miller (MI)
- Shelley Moore Capito (WV)
- Connie Morella (MD)
- Tim Murphy (PA)
- Erik Paulsen (MN)
- Tom Petri (WI)
- Bruce Poliquin (ME)
- Jon Porter (NV)
- Deborah Pryce (OH)
- Jack Quinn (NY)
- Todd Platts (PA)
- Jim Ramstad (MN)
- Ralph Regula (OH)
- Dave Reichert (WA)
- Jim Renacci (OH)
- Tom Rooney (FL)
- Ileana Ros-Lehtinen (FL)
- Marge Roukema (NJ)
- Jon Runyan (NJ)
- Jim Saxton (NJ)
- Bobby Schilling (IL)
- Aaron Schock (IL)
- Joe Schwarz (MI)
- Chris Shays (CT)
- Rob Simmons (CT)
- Elise Stefanik (NY)
- Steve Stivers (OH)
- Lee Terry (NE)
- Pat Tiberi (OH)
- Dave Trott (MI)
- Greg Walden (OR)
- James Walsh (NY)
- Jerry Weller (IL)
- Ed Whitfield (KY)
- Heather Wilson (NM)

== See also ==
- Blue Dog Coalition
- Freedom Caucus
- Liberty Caucus
- Republican Study Committee
- Tea Party Caucus
- Rockefeller Republican
- Young Turks
