= 1993 Allentown mayoral election =

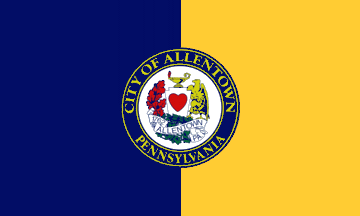
- November 2, 1993

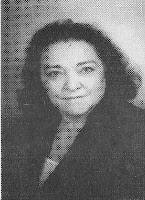
Candidate	William L. Heydt	John Pressman	Emma Tropiano
Party	Republican	Democratic	Independent
Popular vote	9,335	8,634	1,914
Percentage	46.9%	43.4%	9.6%
Mayor before election
Joseph S. Daddona
Democratic
Elected mayor
William L. Heydt
Republican

The 1993 Allentown mayoral election was a municipal election to determine a new mayor of Allentown, Pennsylvania. Incumbent 16-year Democratic mayor Joseph S. Daddona refused to run for re-election, retiring from politics allowing for a new slate of Democratic candidates to try and succeed him, but Republican William L. Heydt won the election to become, to date, the most recent Republican mayor of Allentown.

== Campaign ==
=== Republican primary ===
The Republicans only had one candidate, political outsider William L. Heydt. Heydt's campaign staff where almost all volunteers, and his son, Joe, was his campaign manager. He gained name-recognition due to an extensive canvassing campaign, and for not skirting around questions, instead directly answering any question on any policy. Heydt also proposed changing the city's government, replacing the home-rule charter which had been in effect for the last 16 years with a Strong-mayor government.

=== Democratic primary ===
The Democratic primary was far more competitive, with the two front runners being former State Representative John Pressman, who lost a re-election bid in 1990 and sought to stage a political comeback, and veteran city councilwoman Emma Tropiano. Tropiano had twice ran for mayor, including in 1989 and 1985, coming up short in the Democratic primary both times. During this election Tropiano touted herself as a champion of Allentown's small businesses, and vowed to eliminate the Allentown Parking Authority, the Downtown Improvement District, and the Allentown Economic Development Corp. Also seeking the bid was Syrian-American Abraham Joseph, who owned a Syrian restaurant, and prioritized increasing the city's sanitation department. He proposed creating civilian sanitation teams led by volunteer "captains" that would patrol their neighborhoods cleaning them, as well as vowing to pass a more stringent anti-litter law. Joseph would frequently clash with the fourth candidate, incumbent councilman Alton “Tony” Frey Jr. who, during a radio interview, would chastise Joseph for entering the race with no political experience, and offered to make a bet on who would end in fourth place. Frey Jr. focused his campaign on reducing the real-estate tax, overhauling the Allentown School District and cutting the city's budget. Pressman would win the nomination with 47.5% of the vote, with Tropiano coming in second place getting 38.3% while Joseph and Frey Jr. came in a distant third and fourth respectively.

=== General election ===
Heydt largely performed a grass-roots campaign, targeting the general Allentown public instead of just Republican voters. He knocked on 12,358 doors and sent between 200 and 300 pamphlets of campaign material per-day. Heydt focused his campaign on fighting crime, reducing taxed, and lowering spending. Despite losing the primary, Tropiano was convinced by her supporters to run a write-in campaign and stated that she regretted having run in the Democratic primary, and should've run as an Independent from the start. Pressman went into the general election the favorite to win, and said he had high hopes during election day. Pressman largely focused on increasing turnout for staunchly Democratic super-voters, and ran an overall more relaxed campaign compared to Heydt. Despite early returns showing a Pressman victory, Heydt ended up winning with 3.4% of the vote, however, outgoing Mayor Daddona noted that Tropiano's write-in campaign largely acted as a spoiler, as if she didn't run most, if not all, of those voters would've voted for Pressman. Pressman was also not aided by Daddona who refused to endorse either candidate. A second registered write-in candidate, Fernando Figueroa, didn't even vote for himself, getting 0 votes.

== Results ==
Mayor of Allentown, Democratic primary, May 16, 1993.
Party	Candidate	Votes	%
Democratic	John Pressman		47.5%
Democratic	Emma Tropiano		38.3%
Democratic	Abraham Joseph		
Democratic	Tony Frey Jr.		
Total votes			100.00%

Mayor of Allentown, November 2, 1993.
Party	Candidate	Votes	%
Republican	William L. Heydt	9,335	46.9%
Democratic	John Pressman	8,634	43.4%
Write-In	Emma Tropiano	1,914	9.6%
Total votes		19,892	100.00%
Republican gain from Democratic			

== Legacy ==
Heydt's largely grass-roots campaign was remembered due to how low-cost it was, especially in the coming elections which would see campaigns spend hundreds of thousands of dollars. Heydt spent only $53,000 in total for his successful mayoral campaign. Heydt would be the first Republican to be elected mayor since Frank Fischl in 1982 and is, to date, the most recent Republican mayor.

== See also ==
- Mayors of Allentown, Pennsylvania
