= Bob Dold =

American politician (born 1969)

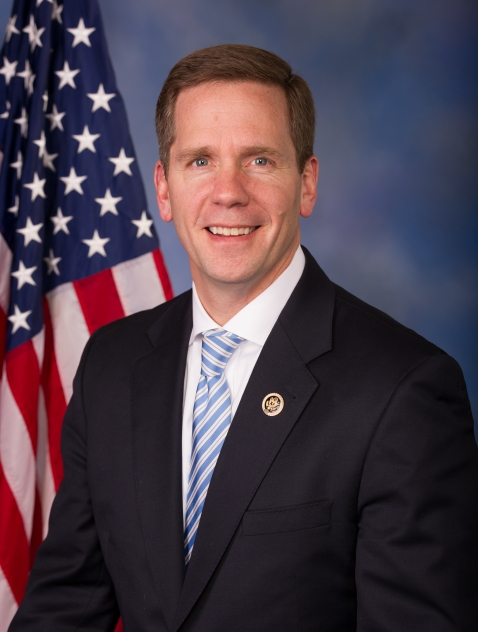

Member of the U.S. House of Representatives from Illinois's 10th district
- In office January 3, 2015 – January 3, 2017
- Preceded by: Brad Schneider
- Succeeded by: Brad Schneider
- In office January 3, 2011 – January 3, 2013
- Preceded by: Mark Kirk
- Succeeded by: Brad Schneider

Personal details
- Born: Robert James Dold Jr. June 23, 1969 (age 57) Evanston, Illinois, U.S.
- Party: Republican
- Spouse: Danielle Dold
- Children: 3
- Education: Denison University (BA); Indiana University, Bloomington (JD); Northwestern University (MBA)

Robert James Dold Jr. (born June 23, 1969) is an American politician who served as the U.S. representative for Illinois's 10th congressional district from 2011 to 2013 and again from 2015 to 2017. He is a member of the Republican Party. Prior to his election, Dold ran his family-owned business, Rose Pest Solutions. In 2010, Dold defeated Democratic Party nominee Dan Seals to replace Republican incumbent Mark Kirk in the U.S. House of Representatives. Dold was narrowly defeated by Democrat Brad Schneider in 2012, but regained the seat in 2014, defeating Schneider in a rematch. He was again defeated by Schneider in 2016 in a third contest between the two.

== Early life, education, and career ==
Dold was born in Evanston, Illinois, the son of Judith Gail (née Kelley) and Robert James Dold. His ancestry includes German, Swedish, Irish, Scottish, and English. He graduated from New Trier High School where he was quarterback of the football team and captain of the wrestling and lacrosse teams. He earned a BA degree from Denison University where he served as President of the Campus Governance Association and was a member of Beta Theta Pi. Dold obtained a JD degree from Indiana University where his classmates selected him to give the commencement address, and an MBA degree from Northwestern University's Kellogg School of Management.

Dold was an intern in the administration of Vice President Dan Quayle. He also clerked for a New York State Judge and served as an investigative counsel for the Republican-led House Government Reform and Oversight Committee.

== U.S. House of Representatives ==
=== Elections ===
==== 2010 ====
Dold ran for the open seat, as five-term incumbent Mark Kirk was retiring to run for the U.S. Senate. In his first radio ad of the general election campaign, Dold described himself as a small business owner, fiscal conservative, and social moderate. He won the primary election on February 2, 2010, and faced Democrat Dan Seals in the general election. Seals, a business consultant, had been the nominee for this seat in 2006 and 2008, losing both times to Kirk. Dold was endorsed by the Chicago Tribune, whose editorial page editor, R. Bruce Dold, is not related to Bob Dold. The US Chamber of Commerce and the Electrical Contractors' Association also endorsed him. Former New York City mayor Rudy Giuliani and Americans for Tax Reform president Grover Norquist campaigned for Dold. After reporting nearly equal fund-raising for the second quarter, Dold's fundraising outpaced Seals' in the third quarter, and he began the final quarter with more cash on hand. At the request of the Federal Election Commission, the Dold campaign amended its second quarter filing in September 2010 to reflect debts and expenditures that had been incurred in the second quarter but had not yet been billed when the filing period ended. Dold won the general election with 51% of the vote to Seals' 49%.

==== 2012 ====
The Cook Political Report named Dold one of the top 10 Republicans most vulnerable to redistricting in 2012; the 10th was already a Democratic-leaning district, and became even more so due to redistricting. The endorsement of Senator Mark Kirk, who was popular in the district at the time, was expected to help Dold. Dold had a strong cash-on-hand advantage over his opponent Brad Schneider. Dold earned the endorsement of the Chicago Tribune and Daily Herald. Schneider defeated Dold 51%–49%, a difference of just 3,000 votes.

==== 2014 ====
On May 8, 2013, Dold announced in an e-mail to supporters that he would run for his old seat in 2014. The National Republican Congressional Committee actively recruited him to run again. The race was expected to be one of the most competitive in the country, and was ranked by Roll Call as the seventh most likely flip for 2014 House rematches. Billionaire and former New York City mayor Michael Bloomberg spent nearly $2 million to help Dold. Dold won the rematch by slightly more than 4,800 votes and took office at the start of the 114th Congress.

==== 2016 ====
Dold ran for re-election in 2016, facing a rematch with Brad Schneider in the general election. He was endorsed by the Human Rights Campaign, the nation's largest LGBT civil rights organization, despite the organization having endorsed Schneider in 2014. Dold was also endorsed by The Chicago Tribune and The Chicago Sun-Times.

He refused to endorse Republican nominee Donald Trump in the 2016 U.S. presidential election, and said he would instead write in an alternative candidate's name.

In the general election, Dold lost to Schneider by 5 percentage points, as Democratic presidential nominee Hillary Clinton won the district by nearly 30.

=== Tenure ===
==== Reputation ====
Dold is a moderate Republican who had a centrist voting record in Congress. The non-partisan organization GovTrack has ranked Dold in the political center of Congress. National Journal did a comprehensive study of key votes in the House, ranking Dold as one of the most independent members of Congress. The district had traditionally elected moderate Republicans, such as Dold and his predecessors John Edward Porter and Mark Kirk.

Dold is an original member of the No Labels movement which, Dold stated, he hoped would help to end the gridlock in Washington, DC. Dold is a member of the Tuesday Group, an informal caucus of moderate Republicans in the U.S. House. In 2015, Dold was elected co-chair of the Tuesday Group. An editorial in The Daily Herald noted Dold's spirit of bipartisanship and called for more Bob Dolds in Congress. According to Roll Call, Dold has moved further to the center during his second term in Congress. In fact, in 2015, The Lugar Center, a Washington, D.C.–based nonprofit founded by former Senator Richard Lugar released a Bipartisan Index in cooperation with Georgetown University, ranking Congressman Dold the fifth most bipartisan congressman (out of 438) in the 114th Congress.

==== Political positions ====
Dold supports abortion rights. In 2012, Dold introduced H.R. 5650, the Protecting Women's Access to Health Care Act, which prevents lawmakers from blocking funds to Planned Parenthood. He has voiced support for stem cell research.

Dold voted for the fiscal cliff compromise bill, which permanently extended most of the Bush middle class tax cuts.

He has stated his support for gay marriage and immigration reform. He became the first House Republican to support the Equality Act, which would amend the Civil Rights Act of 1964 to include a ban on discrimination on the basis of sexual orientation or gender identity.

Regarding the Affordable Care Act, he has stated his desire to improve the law rather than fight to repeal or defund it. Dold has said the Affordable Care Act was right to require insurance coverage for pre-existing conditions and to allow students to stay on a parent's insurance to age 26. Upon his return to the House in 2015, Dold became one of just three Republican Congressmen to vote against repeal of the Affordable Care Act – the first time any elected Republicans at the federal level voted against such a measure.

Dold supports gun control measures. In 2015, he signed onto a bipartisan bill that would expand background checks for gun purchasers. He accepts the scientific consensus on climate change and believes steps should be taken to address the issue.

In 2016, Dold introduced a bill to create a grant to expand the availability of naloxone, a heroin overdose antidote.

==== Personnel ====
Upon taking office in 2011, Dold hired former lobbyist Eric Burgeson, who grew up in Illinois' 10th district, as his congressional Chief of Staff. Burgeson and Dold had previously worked together on Sen. Bob Dole's 1996 presidential campaign. Dold instituted a policy that "staff may not work on matters of substance with former clients." In his second term in office, his chief of staff was James Slepian.

=== Committee assignments ===
Dold was originally appointed to the Committee on Financial Services for the 114th Congress, but after the resignation of fellow Illinois Republican Aaron Schock, Dold was chosen to replace him on the powerful Ways and Means Committee.

- Committee on Ways and Means
  - Subcommittee on Human Resources
  - Subcommittee on Social Security

Previous

- Committee on Financial Services
  - Subcommittee on Capital Markets and Government-Sponsored Enterprises
  - Subcommittee on Insurance, Housing and Community Opportunity

== Post-congressional work ==
In 2018, Dold started an organization to promote and support moderate Republicans.

In 2022, Dold joined other former Republican members of Congress to support the passage of federal legislation prohibiting discrimination against LGBTQ+ individuals.

== Personal life ==
Dold is married and has three children. He resides in Kenilworth, Illinois and runs Rose Pest Solutions, the oldest pest control company in the country. Dold attends Kenilworth Union Church and is a scoutmaster for Kenilworth Boy Scout Troop No. 13.

== Electoral history ==
Illinois's 10th district Republican primary, February 2, 2010
Party	Candidate	Votes	%
Republican	Robert Dold	19,691	38.03
Republican	Elizabeth Coulson	16,149	31.19
Republican	Dick Green	7,595	14.67
Republican	Arie Friedman	7,260	14.02
Republican	Paul Hamann	1,078	2.08
Total votes		51,773	100.00

Illinois's 10th district general election, November 2, 2010
Party	Candidate	Votes	%
Republican	Robert Dold	109,941	51.08
Democratic	Dan Seals	105,290	48.92
Write-In	Author C. Brumfield	1	0.00
Total votes		215,232	100.00

Republican primary results
Party	Candidate	Votes	%
Republican	Robert Dold (incumbent)	36,647	100.0
Total votes		36,647	100.0

Illinois' 10th congressional district, 2012
Party	Candidate	Votes	%
Democratic	Brad Schneider	133,890	50.6
Republican	Bob Dold (incumbent)	130,564	49.4
Total votes		264,454	100.0
Democratic gain from Republican			

Republican primary results 2014
Party	Candidate	Votes	%
Republican	Robert Dold	32,124	100.0

Illinois's 10th congressional district, 2014
Party	Candidate	Votes	%
Republican	Robert Dold	95,992	51.3
Democratic	Brad Schneider (incumbent)	91,136	48.7
Total votes		187,128	100.0
Republican gain from Democratic			

Republican primary results 2016
Party	Candidate	Votes	%
Republican	Robert Dold (incumbent)	61,968	100.0
Total votes		61,968	100.0

Illinois's 10th congressional district, 2016
Party	Candidate	Votes	%
Democratic	Brad Schneider	150,435	52.6
Republican	Bob Dold (incumbent)	135,535	47.4
Independent	Joseph William Kopsick (write-in)	26	0.0
Total votes		285,996	100.0
Democratic gain from Republican			

U.S. House of Representatives
Preceded by Mark Kirk	Member of the U.S. House of Representatives from Illinois's 10th congressional district 2011–2013	Succeeded by Brad Schneider
Preceded by Brad Schneider	Member of the U.S. House of Representatives from Illinois's 10th congressional district 2015–2017	Succeeded by Brad Schneider
Party political offices
Preceded by Erik Paulsen	Chair of the Tuesday Group; 2015–2017; Served alongside: Charlie Dent, Adam Kinzinger	Succeeded by Charlie Dent; Tom MacArthur; Elise Stefanik
U.S. order of precedence (ceremonial)
Preceded by Phil Hare as Former U.S. Representative	Order of precedence of the United States as Former U.S. Representative	Succeeded by Jerry Carl as Former U.S. Representative
