= Michael Schlossberg =

American politician

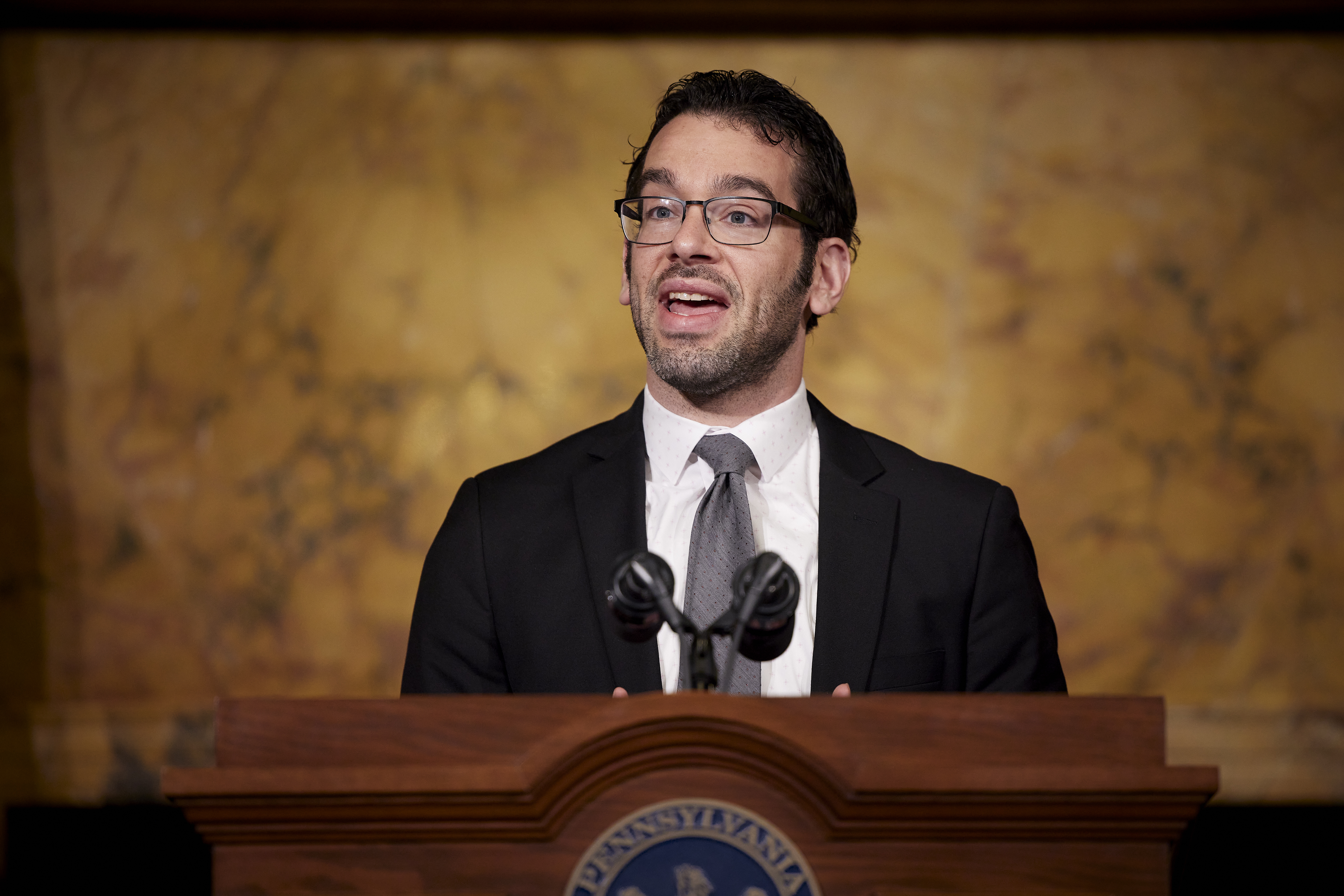
- Schlossberg in 2022

Member of the Pennsylvania House of Representatives from the 132nd district
- Incumbent
- Assumed office January 1, 2013
- Preceded by: Jennifer Mann

Personal details
- Born: May 15, 1983 (age 43)
- Party: Democratic
- Spouse: Brenna
- Children: 2
- Education: Muhlenberg College; Lehigh University
- Profession: Legislator
- Website: Rep. Mike Schlossberg

Michael H. Schlossberg (born May 15, 1983) is a member of the Pennsylvania House of Representatives, representing the 132nd district since 2013. He is a member of the Democratic Party.

== Personal life and education ==
Schlossberg graduated from Livingston High School in Livingston, New Jersey, in 2001. He graduated from Muhlenberg College in 2005, majoring in political science and psychology. Schlossberg earned a MA from Lehigh University in 2006.

Schlossberg is married to Brenna Schlossberg, a teacher in the Allentown School District.

== Career ==
Schlossberg was elected to the Allentown City Council in 2009, becoming its youngest member ever. Schlossberg was elected to the Pennsylvania House in 2012. His predecessor retired and endorsed Schlossberg, and Schlossberg was the only candidate of any party to appear on the primary ballot. Schlossberg serves on the Rules committee

In 2013, Schlossberg introduced a bill that would require rapists to pay child support for the children they fathered.
