= 2021 Allentown mayoral election =

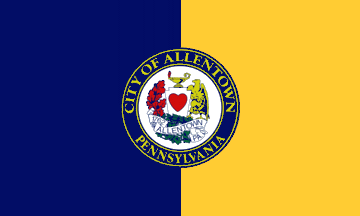
- November 2, 2021
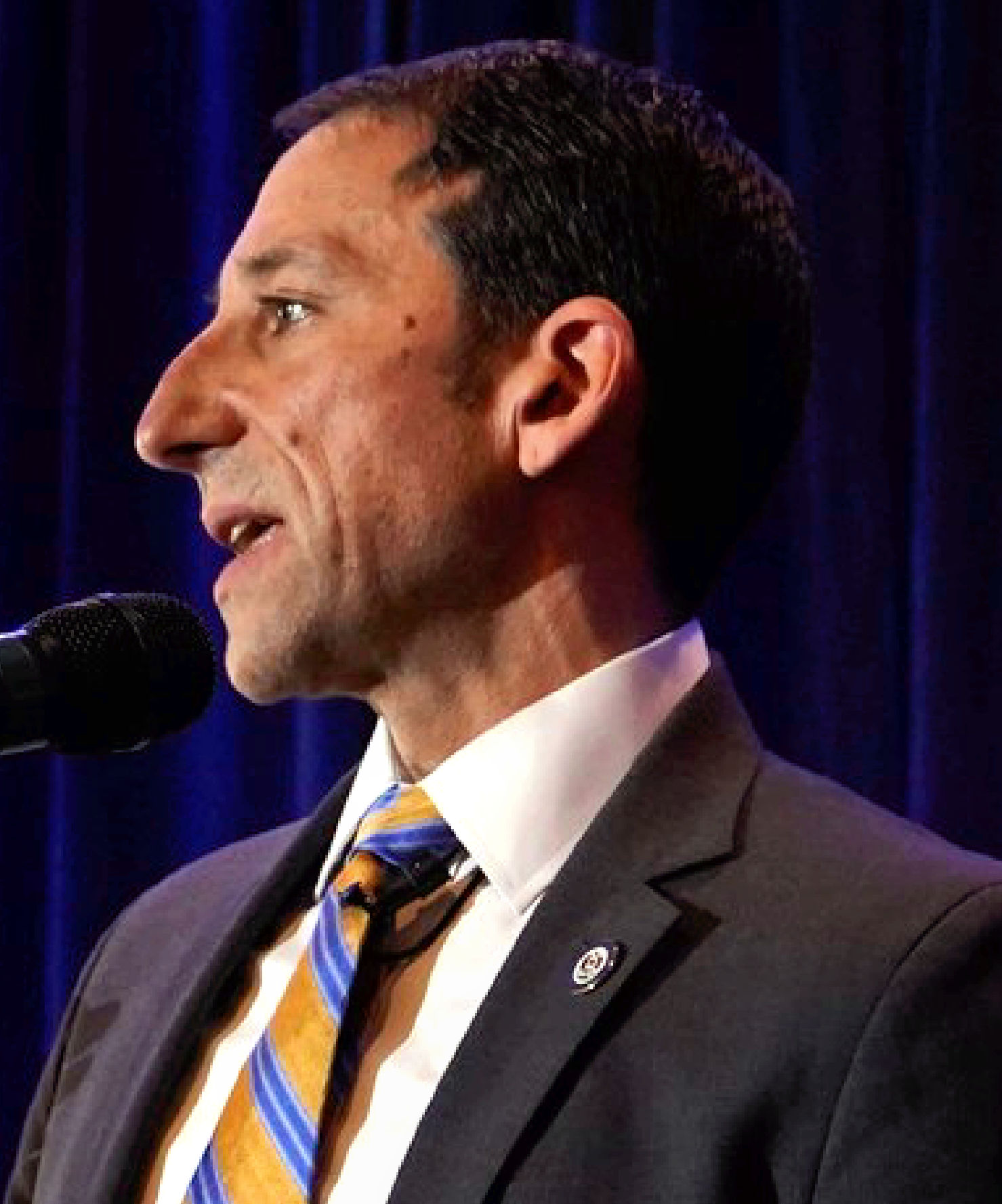

Candidate	Matthew Tuerk	Timothy Ramos
Party	Democratic	Republican
Popular vote	8,206	4,299
Percentage	64.13%	33.60%
Mayor before election
Ray O'Connell
Democratic
Elected mayor
Matthew Tuerk
Democratic

The 2021 mayoral election in Allentown, Pennsylvania was held on November 2, 2021. The primary election was held on May 18, 2021.

== Background ==
Prior Democratic Mayor Ray O'Connell assumed the office in March 2018 following the resignation of former mayor Ed Pawlowski following his federal conviction on 47 counts of conspiracy, bribery, attempted extortion, false statements to federal officials, mail fraud, and wire fraud. O'Connell was eligible for re-election despite his interim term during which he attempted to restore public confidence in the municipal government. However, due to a 27% increase in property taxes, and a hiring freeze coupled with layoffs from the municipal government due to the COVID-19 pandemic resulted in large scale discontent towards him from within his own party.

== Campaign ==
O'Connell faced a six-way split in the Democratic primary between himself, Ce-Ce Gerlach, Julio Guridy, Stevie Jones, Matt Tuerk, and Joshua Siegel. Gerlach, 35, served two terms as a city councilor and previously served two terms on the Allentown School Board. Guridy, 60, was a city councilor for 20 years who had previously worked for the Delaware River Joint Toll Bridge Commission. Jones, 27, was a political freshman and Kutztown University of Pennsylvania alumni who dropped out prior to the primary. Tuerk, 45, was also a political freshman who held offices in the Allentown Economic Development Corporation and the Lehigh Valley Economic Development Corporation. Siegel was a city councilmen who left the race early. Police chief Roger MacLean also contemplated joining the race but ultimately did not. On the Republican side, Timothy Ramos would be the sole candidate seeking nomination. The vice president of the Lehigh County Republican Party, he had previously lost to O'Connell in the 2019 Allentown mayoral special election, and his brother, Steve, was a member of the "Latinos for Trump" in 2016 and led its Lehigh Valley local chapter.

Tuerk would win the crowded and hotly-contested Democratic primary with just 1.5% or 115 individual votes above O’Connell. This was the most competitive primary in Allentown's history due to the number of candidates within close margins of each other. This primary also saw the highest turnout in a Democratic primary since the 2005 election. However, it was not the closest margin that Allentown has seen. In the 1997 election, the Democratic nominee was decided by just a single vote, and in the 2001 election it was just 46 votes. The primary was largely treated as the general election as Republicans had not won the mayoral office in 24 years and with 60% of the city's electorate being registered Democrats. However, for the first time in the city's history, both candidates from the major parties would be Latinos.

Turek would center his campaign on bringing more jobs to Allentown. He also knocked on an average of 1,075 doors per week during his campaign. Tuerk handily defeated Ramos on November 2, with almost double the number of votes, become Allentown's first Latino mayor.

== Results ==
Mayor of Allentown, Democratic primary, 2021
Party	Candidate	Votes	%
Democratic	Matthew Tuerk	2,064	26.52
Democratic	Ray O'Connell (incumbent)	1,942	24.95
Democratic	Julio Guridy	1,927	24.76
Democratic	Ce Ce Gerlach	1,817	23.34
Write-in		34	0.44
Total votes		7,784	100.00

Mayor of Allentown, Republican primary, 2021
Party	Candidate	Votes	%
Republican	Timothy Ramos	2,007	89.48
Write-in		236	10.52
Total votes		2,243	100.00

Mayor of Allentown, 2021 general election
Party	Candidate	Votes	%
Democratic	Matthew Tuerk	8,206	64.13
Republican	Timothy Ramos	4,299	33.60
Independent	Solomon Tembo	239	1.87
Write-in		52	0.41
Total votes		12,796	100.00
Democratic hold			

== See also ==
- 2021 United States elections
- List of mayors of Allentown, Pennsylvania
