= Joshua Siegel (politician) =

American politician

Lehigh County Executive
- Incumbent
- Assumed office January 5, 2026
- Preceded by: Phillips Armstrong

Member of the Pennsylvania House of Representatives from the 22nd district
- In office January 3, 2023 – December 17, 2025
- Preceded by: Peter Schweyer (redistricting)
- Succeeded by: Ana Tiburcio

Member of the Allentown City Council
- In office January 6, 2020 – January 3, 2023

Personal details
- Born: November 15, 1993 (age 32) Bethlehem, Pennsylvania, US
- Party: Democratic
- Education: Seton Hall University (BS)

Joshua Siegel is an American politician who is a former member of the Pennsylvania House of Representatives. A member of the Democratic Party, he represented the 22nd district, which contains parts of Allentown and Salisbury Township. He resigned from the chamber in December 2025 after being elected as county executive of Lehigh County, taking office on January 5, 2026.

== Early life, education, and early career ==
Siegel was born in Bethlehem, Pennsylvania. He graduated from Seton Hall University in 2016 with a Bachelor of Science degree in international relations and diplomacy. Siegel moved to Allentown in 2016. He worked as a field organizer on a Pennsylvania House of Representatives election in the 183rd district. He was a candidate for mayor of Allentown in 2017.

From 2017 to 2020, Siegel worked as the public information officer for Lehigh County, and since 2020 he has worked as the assistant operations manager for the county controller's Office.

=== Allentown City Council (2020–2022) ===
Siegel was elected to the Allentown city council on November 5, 2019, at age 25, making him at the time the youngest member ever elected to the body. Siegel was sworn in on January 6, 2020. He served as chair of the Budget and Finance Committee for three years.

During Siegel's tenure on the city council, he successfully passed paid family leave for city workers, making Allentown the fifth municipality or political subdivision in Pennsylvania to offer this benefit to their city employees. Siegel also successfully led the drive to bring the city's vehicle fleet maintenance back in house after over twenty years of privatization, citing concerns over public safety, treatment of union employees, substandard wages and lengthy times required to service critical city vehicles such as fire trucks and snowplows. Siegel also championed campaign finance reform legislation that would have capped the total size of contributions made by each donor; his bill, the provisions of which he argued would have prevented the corruption scandal that resulted in the resignation and federal conviction of Allentown mayor Ed Pawlowski in 2018, was defeated by a margin of 4–3. Siegel successfully co-sponsored a contractor ordinance that would have required city public works projects to go firms with Class-A apprenticeships, asserting that it would promote workforce development and protect the use of taxpayer dollars by ensuring the use of high-quality labor and contractors.

Following the U.S. Supreme Court decision Dobbs v. Jackson Women's Health Organization which overturned Roe v. Wade, Siegel fought to pass local legislation that would have protected reproductive access in Allentown, including a buffer zone around the local Planned Parenthood clinic to protect those entering from harassment or intimidation, as well as legislation aimed at crisis pregnancy centers for disseminating false or misleading information and prohibiting city resources from being used to aide out of state prosecutors pursuing those coming to Pennsylvania for reproductive care.

== Pennsylvania House of Representatives (2023–2025) ==
=== Elections ===
==== 2022 ====
During the 2022 Pennsylvania redistricting process, the city of Allentown gained a third seat in the Pennsylvania House of Representatives. On February 8, 2022, Joshua Siegel declared his candidacy for the newly created seat, numbered as the 22nd district, covering most of the city of Allentown as well as some suburbs to the east and southeast. Siegel's candidacy focused on addressing the crisis of affordability and rising inflation such as the rising cost of housing, education and childcare; as well as economic development and regionalism, education funding, reducing gun violence, comprehensive public safety, affordable housing, responsible development, protecting the right to organize, strengthening unions, protecting democracy, reproductive healthcare and LGBTQ rights.

On May 17, Siegel defeated Saeed Georges by a margin of 64%–36% to win the Democratic nomination for the seat. In the November 8 general election Siegel defeated Robert E. Smith, a former Allentown school board member, by a margin of 64%–36% to become the state representative-elect for the 22nd district.

=== Committee assignments ===
Siegel has been appointed to service on the House Appropriations, Transportation, State Government and Housing and Community Development committees.

== Legislative Leadership ==
=== Protecting Abortion Access ===
Siegel has been labeled as a pro-choice champion, the highest possible ranking available by PA Choice tracker. As a legislator Siegel has championed and supported legislation to protect access to abortion and expand and promote access to reproductive rights. He is a co-sponsor of legislation that would remove restrictive regulations known as TRAP laws or targeted regulations on abortion providers that were implemented with the intention of forcing clinics to close.

Siegel voted in favor of shield law legislation that would protect women seeking reproductive care in Pennsylvania from out of state prosecutors. The legislation would prohibit Commonwealth resources from being used to assist in helping facilitate prosecution of women in Pennsylvania traveling from other states where abortion access has been criminalized. Advocates of the legislation argued that Pennsylvania had become a sanctuary for those seeking access to abortion and both doctors and patients shouldn't have to fear prosecution for providing critical medical care or be bound by dangerous out of state laws.

=== Gun Safety Legislation ===
Siegel has been an outspoken advocate and voice for gun safety legislation. Siegel voted in favor of HB1018 which would have created extreme risk protection orders (ERPO) or red flag laws which allows for the short-term removal of firearms from people who might be a danger to themselves or others. Siegel and others have argued that red flag laws can help prevent suicides and mass shootings by removing firearms from the possession of people who show early warning signs of suicide or make alarming statements online.

Siegel also voted for legislation that would have created universal background checks in Pennsylvania. Current law exempts long guns from background checks meaning that they can be purchased without proper criminal background checks allowing them to be purchased privately or transferred without oversight. Siegel and other legislators argued this was a way to prevent firearms from getting into the hands of criminals and other who should not be allowed to possess firearms. Siegel and advocates argued this was about public safety and protecting law enforcement by ensuring that private sellers cannot simply transfer a gun without regular legal oversight.

Siegel also supported HB338 which would have mandated that lost or stolen firearms be reported to local authorities. The bill narrowly failed in the house. Siegel and advocates argued that mandating the reporting of lost or stolen firearms would help reduce crime and neighborhood gun violence by helping law enforcement better track illegal gun trafficking and prevent individuals such as felons and domestic abusers from acquiring guns. He also argued would also help reduce straw purchasing, when an individual buys a gun on behalf of someone who is not legally permitted to own a gun. Advocates also pointed to the high number of guns that are used to commit crimes are often stolen or claimed to be stolen.

Siegel also supported HB731 which would have mandated the safe storage of firearms in households with guns. Siegel has been an outspoken critic of those who fail to properly store their firearms either leaving them unsecured and loaded or in easy access to children. Siegel and safe storage advocates have pointed out that safe storage laws prevent the tragic deaths of children who often are victims and either wounded or killed. They also reduce access by potential school shooters who frequently steal weapons from the house of relative.

=== Democracy ===
Siegel has co-sponsored and supported legislation he argues will ensure that elections are protected from efforts to subvert trust and faith in the process and expand access to the ballot box. Siegel voted for HB847 which would have allowed Pennsylvania counties 7 days to pre-canvass mail-in ballots ensuring they can be counted more efficiently and thoroughly. Advocates argue this will help counties deliver final results quicker and provide more immediate winners in our elections, preventing election deniers from casting doubt on the electoral process and ensure voters don't have to wait days or potentially weeks for election results. Pre-canvassing allows for the "inspection and opening of all envelopes containing official absentee ballots or mail-in ballots, the removal of such ballots from the envelopes and the counting, computing and tallying of the votes reflected 'on the ballots." according to the Pennsylvania Election Code.

=== Reducing Costs for Families and Seniors ===
Siegel voted for a increase in Pennsylvania's Property Tax and Rent Rebate Program in the 2023-2024 budget which expanded eligibility for the program to nearly 173,000 Pennsylvanians by raising the income eligibility to $45,000 for both homeowners and renters. The maximum potential benefit was raised to $1,000 for qualifying applicants. The program had not been expanded since 2006 resulting in many seniors that were previously eligible losing their eligibility as Social Security cost of living increases pushed them outside of the income range.

Siegel also voted to expand Pennsylvania Child and Dependent Care Tax Credit for Pennsylvania families, previously the State of Pennsylvania would match only 30% of the Federal Child Tax Credit. The tax credit allows families to deduct the costs associated with childcare or care of dependent on their state income taxes. The new law expands the state match to 100% of the federal credit resulting in a maximum benefit of $2,100 for a family with two or more children. The program benefits 210,000 Pennsylvanians families annually.

=== Funding Public Schools and Defending Public Education ===
Siegel has been a strong advocate and supporter of public schools and opposes the creation of a taxpayer funded school voucher system. Siegel voted for the 2023-2024 budget which included the largest ever increase in basic education funding for Pennsylvania K-12 public schools at $567 million and over $46 million to ensure that Pennsylvania schools could provide universal school breakfast. Siegel is a supporter of house legislation that would codify into law the seven-year spending plan put forth by the Basic Education Funding Commission to ensure that Pennsylvania's public schools are properly funded. A Pennsylvania Commonwealth Court decision recently said that Pennsylvania's public education system was unconstitutional as a result of the level of underfunding it has endured. The Basic Education Funding Commission has put the total figure of underfunding in the billions at $5.4 billion. Siegel and advocates argue that solidifying the seven-year funding proposals ensures the state predictably invests in public education and ensures consistency in addressing the education shortfall in addition to stabilizing property taxes and protecting communities from having shoulder the burden of funding schools from primarily local funding sources.

=== Housing Attainability, Development and Reducing House Costs ===
Siegel has been an outspoken advocate for making housing more attainable for seniors and middle-class families and helping reduce the cost of housing across the State of Pennsylvania. He has introduced legislation around zoning reform to make it easier to build missing middle housing such as duplexes, triplexes and quads allowing density to be occur within existing developments in order to promote land preservation, walkability and smart growth which he argues will save taxpayer dollars, create more desirable communities and improve access to employment, healthcare and recreation that all generations demand. Siegel is a member of the PA Housing Choices Coalition made up of a variety of housing advocates who argue that restrictive zoning and land-use planning have constrained supply of housing which is driving up prices and imperil the freedom of Pennsylvanians to live in the communities where they want to live and deprive them of access to opportunity.

Siegel has also advocated for changing building codes to make it easier to build larger apartments that can accommodate families through legalizing point access corridors or single stair-case legislation which allow condominiums and apartments to be built around a central stairwell and elevator shaft in order to conserve space and improve the quality of units. The legislation is modeled after traditional building standards in Western Europe and Seattle. HB 1988 authored by Siegel would create a technical advisory committee to create best practices and create guidelines around point access corridors to help municipalities determine if they wanted to legalize it at the local level and ensure that the buildings had strong safety standards.

=== Redevelopment of Shopping Malls and Shopping Plazas ===
Siegel has promoted the redevelopment of blighted shopping malls and shopping plazas as well those experiencing a high level of vacancy. Siegel authored and passed through the Pennsylvania House, HB 1799 which provides local taxing jurisdictions with the ability to offer tax abatements in exchange for the mixed-use redevelopment of shopping malls and shopping plazas. The bill allows municipalities to request policy priorities such as energy efficient buildings, attainable housing, green space and walking trails in exchange for the tax abatements promoting both economic development and core municipal goals.

=== Conversion of Office Space into Housing ===
Siegel has advocated for making it simpler for municipalities and developers to convert vacant or high vacancy office space to housing through expediting the local zoning process to ensure new housing is brought into communities quickly. Siegel has argued that there has been a significant decline in demand for office space and the rise of remote work means that downtowns and communities need to create more opportunities for people to live in them and focus less on traditional commercial office development.

=== Supporting Unions and Workers' Rights ===
Siegel voted in favor of extending OSHA protections to public sector workers to prevent workplace injuries and fatalities. Pennsylvania doesn't require public employers to follow federal Occupational Safety and Health standards which leaves workers vulnerable to unsafe workplaces. HB229 would have ensured that public sector employers in Pennsylvania were required to follow the same safety standards as all other employees. It passed with bipartisan support in the house.

Siegel voted in favor of legislation that would extend unemployment benefits to striking workers to protect the financial well-being of workers and their families during labor disputes. Proponents of the legislation argued that the right to strike is protected by the federal government and offering benefits was a safety net for workers simply looking to bargain for better benefits or wages. Striking workers can often go months before a deal is reached which puts their families in financial jeopardy. The legislation passed the house.

Siegel authored HB1499 which establishes statewide contractor requirements for anyone performing state public works projects, the legislation required among other things that contractors not have previous labor law violations such as failure to pay unemployment compensation or misclassifying workers and that contractors bidding on public works projects would have to operate class-A apprenticeship programs recognized by the State of Pennsylvania. Siegel argued the legislation would help root out bad contractors that treated their workers improperly, protect taxpayer dollars by ensuring that bridges and roads were built with the highest quality labor and completed properly and on time, addressed the shortage of construction workers by rewarding firms that invested in the skills of their employees and encourage contractors to make investments in workforce development. The bill passed the house with bipartisan support with the support of 134 house members.

== Electoral history ==
Allentown mayoral election, 2017
Party	Candidate	Votes	%
Democratic primary election
Democratic	Ed Pawlowski (incumbent)	1,702	28.20%
Democratic	Ray O'Connell	1,377	22.82%
Democratic	Charles F. Thiel	1,333	22.09%
Democratic	Siobhan Bennett	719	11.91%
Democratic	David Jones	575	9.53%
Democratic	Joshua Siegel	295	4.89%
Democratic	Nathan L. Woodring	34	0.56%
Total votes		6,035	100.00%
General election
Democratic	Ed Pawlowski (incumbent)	4,833	39.12%
Republican	Nat Hyman	4,569	36.99%
Write-in		2,250	18.21%
Independent	John Richard Ingram	498	4.03%
Independent	Solomon Tembo	203	1.64%
Total votes		12,353	100.00%
Democratic hold			

Allentown City Council election, 2019
Party	Candidate	Votes	%
Democratic primary election
Democratic	Cecilia Gerlach	3,310	27.65%
Democratic	Candida Affa (incumbent)	2,192	18.31%
Democratic	Joshua Siegel	1,985	16.58%
Democratic	Courtney Robinson (incumbent)	1,897	15.84%
Democratic	Luis E. Acevedo	1,381	11.53%
Democratic	John Rosario	1,208	10.09%
Total votes		11,973	100.00%
General election
Democratic	Cecilia Gerlach	8,171	29.74%
Democratic	Joshua Siegel	7,347	26.74%
Democratic	Candida Affa (incumbent)	7,230	26.32%
Republican	Joe Hoffman	4,725	17.20%
Total votes		27,473	100.00%
Democratic hold			

Pennsylvania House of Representatives, 22nd district, 2022
Party	Candidate	Votes	%
Democratic primary election
Democratic	Joshua Siegel	1,712	64.00%
Democratic	Saeed Georges	963	36.00%
Total votes		2,675	100.00%
General election
Democratic	Joshua Siegel	6,442	63.76%
Republican	Robert Smith, Jr.	3,662	36.24%
Total votes		10,104	100.00%
Democratic hold			

2025 Lehigh County Executive election
Party	Candidate	Votes	%
Democratic	Joshua Siegel	57,007	60.69%
Republican	Roger MacLean	36,932	39.31%
Total votes		93,409	100.00%
Democratic hold			

Pennsylvania House of Representatives
Preceded by Peter Schweyer (redistricting)	Member of the Pennsylvania House of Representatives from the 22nd district 2023–2025	Succeeded by Ana Tiburcio
