= 2025 Allentown mayoral election =

Local election in Pennsylvania, US

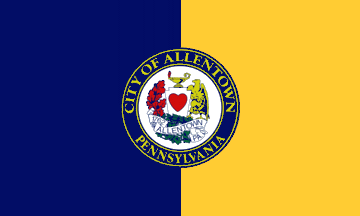
- November 4, 2025
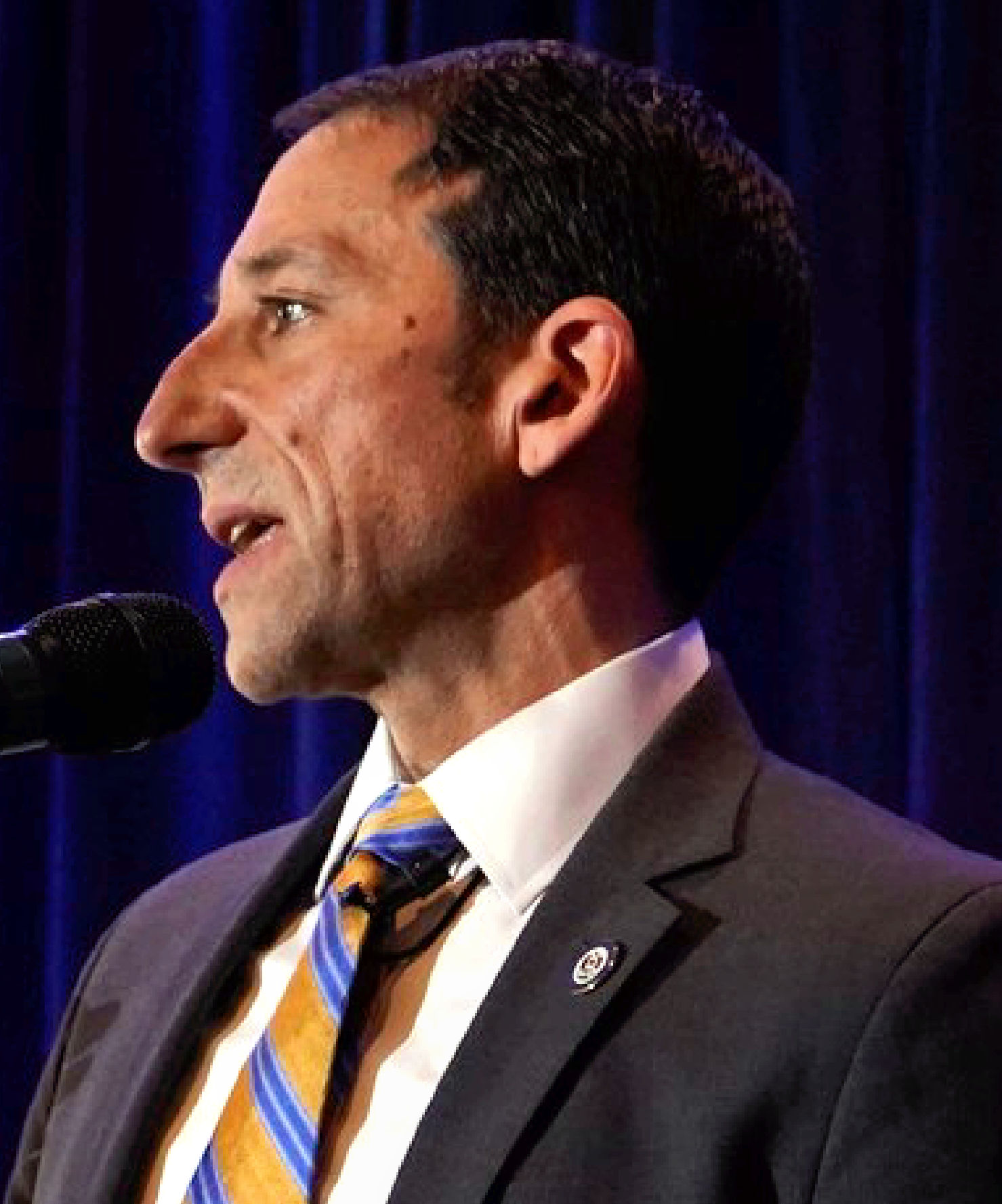

Nominee	Matthew Tuerk	Ed Zucal
Party	Democratic	Republican
Popular vote	12,118	4,672
Percentage	72.17%	27.83%
Mayor before election
Matthew Tuerk
Democratic
Elected mayor
Matthew Tuerk
Democratic

The 2025 Allentown mayoral election was held on November 4, 2025. Democratic incumbent Matthew Tuerk won a second term, defeating Republican nominee Ed Zucal. Primary elections were held on May 20, 2025.

== Background ==
Matthew Tuerk faced three challengers in the 2021 Democratic primary; council members Ce-Ce Gerlach and Julio Guridy, and incumbent mayor Ray O’Connell. Tuerk would win the highly competitive primary by just 121 votes barely beating O’Connell. He would go on to win the mayoral election, by 64.13% in 2021, against Timothy Ramos. Tuerk announced his re-election campaign, in November 2024. Tuerk is the first Hispanic mayor of Allentown, a city with a Hispanic population over 125,000.

== Democratic primary ==
=== Candidates ===
==== Nominee ====
- Matthew Tuerk, incumbent mayor

==== Eliminated in primary ====
- Ed Zucal, city councilman

==== Withdrawn ====
- Cynthia Mota, city councilwoman

=== Campaign ===
Tuerk has touted FBI statistics that showed a drop in crime in Allentown during his first term. He also announced a plan to improve traffic signals, pedestrian walkways and roadways near schools with an aim of eliminating traffic fatalities by 2030. Tuerk also promised to continue to grow tourism in the city, and improve the city's A2 bond rating.

Tuerk saw a concerted primary challenge by city councilmen Ed Zucal a retired Allentown police sergeant elected as a Democrat in 2017. Zucal has been highly critical of Tuerk's tenure at the city's helm claiming that the quality of life has significantly dropped since he took over as mayor. Zucal also challenged the FBI statistics of not accurately portraying the continuing issue of crime, as well as opposing Tuerk's fiscal management. Another Democratic city coucilwoman, Cynthia Mota, also briefly sought the nomination, running a campaign centered on "inclusion and economic opportunities" but would drop out in March to focus on re-election to the city council. Zucal's campaign largely entered on calling Tuerk "Woke" distributing mailers with slogans such as “Go Woke, GO BROKE” and calling Tuerk a “Trump-deranged Democrat." In response Tuerk stated Zucal "has built his entire campaign of lies" noting that despite repeated cease and desist attempts by the Allentown police department Zucal still often depicted himself in his police uniform during the campaign.

The NAACP raised allegations that Tuerk has fostered city employees that have used racial slurs, mocking of sexual preferences and identities, verbal attacks and denials of promotions. Zucal has pressed this issue, initiating a vote of no confidence against Tuerk that passed the city council 4-3. In April 2024 the city council approved a $300,000 outside investigation of the allegations and on June 26, council voted 6–1 in favor of allocating $20,000 to sue Tuerk and city finance director Bina Patel due to Tuerk going over the city council's head and hiring their own external investigation. However, in December the council voted 4–3 to suspend the lawsuit.

=== Results ===
2025 Mayor of Allentown Democratic primary
Party	Candidate	Votes	%
Democratic	Matthew Tuerk (incumbent)	4,945	80.33
Democratic	Ed Zucal	1,191	19.35
Write-in		20	0.32
Total votes		6,156	100.00

== Republican primary ==
=== Candidates ===
==== Nominee ====
- Ed Zucal, candidate in Democratic primary (write-in)

==== Withdrawn ====
- Solomon Tembo, businessman, and independent candidate for mayor in 2021

==== Declined ====
- Tim Ramos, mayoral nominee in 2019 and 2021

=== Campaign ===
Solomon Tembo, an Independent candidate in 2021, had filed to run as a Republican, however, provided a Salisbury Township address during his petition, and local Allentowner Danielle Scott challenged his eligibility to run for mayor due to not being a resident, as well as alleging 110 of his 140 signatures he'd collected weren't valid. A hearing had been scheduled with the Lehigh County Board of Elections, however, Tembo instead withdrew his nomination.

Tim Ramos, the Republican nominee in 2019 and 2021, announced he was considering running again due to people calling him and voicing support for a third run. However, he would ultimately not file a petition meaning there is no Republican candidate this election cycle.

The primary would ultimately be decided by write-in votes. Ed Zucal, Tuerk's challenger in the Democratic primary, would launch a write in campaign that would see him win 498 write-in votes, and thus the Republican nomination.

=== Results ===
2025 Mayor of Allentown Republican primary
Party	Candidate	Votes	%
Republican	Ed Zucal (write-in)	499	66.80
Write-in		122	16.33
Republican	Matthew Tuerk (write-in)	115	15.39
Republican	Solomon Tembo (write-in)	11	1.47
Total votes		747	100.00

== General election ==
Incumbent Allentown mayor Matthew Tuerk would win the Democratic primary after defeating councilman Ed Zucal with over 80% of the vote. However, Zucal will again face Tuerk in the November general election after receiving the most votes, all write-in, in the Republican primary. He would receive only 115 votes in the Republican primary, needing 100 to clinch the Republican nomination.

Despite winning the Republican nomination and staying in the race, Zucal would not comment on the election for several months until July 18, 2025, claiming that not talking about how he was running for mayor was part of his strategy to win the election. On July 23, Zucal said he was "absolutely" still running saying, “It's an uphill battle, but it's not impossible” while declining to hold a debate against Tuerk.

In October 2025, Zucal announced his new campaign strategy of confronting Turek on the issues of "Reducing Crime, Community Policing, Strong Quality of Life Initiative, Restoring Trust and Transparency and Exercising Fiscal Responsibility" while also focusing on door to door knocking, and a grassroots political effort. The Republican Party of Lehigh County not only refused to endorse Zucal, but has also denied him any supporting due to their "strict" position of only supporting registered Republicans, which Zucal is not. At the same time Zucal only reported $21,279 in fundraising. Turek meanwhile has sought to portray the general election as a referendum on not only his support, but also his policies. Zucal focused much of his campaign around Tuerk increasing the municipalities taxes by 3.96% to maintain city services.

=== Results ===
2025 Allentown mayoral election
Party	Candidate	Votes	%	±%
Democratic	Matthew Tuerk (incumbent)	12,001	72.10%	+7.97
Republican	Ed Zucal	4,644	27.90%	−5.70
Write-in				
Total votes		16,645	100.0%	
Democratic hold				

== Aftermath ==
Tuerk would easily win with 72% of the vote to Zucal's 28%. Zucal stated that the results "surprised" him and that he expected a closer margin due to the unpopularity of Tuerk's tax increase. Zucal said he would take "time off" before considering a potential political comeback. The election had a higher than expected turnout of 38%, for reference, the primaries only had a turnout of 16.8%. All four democratic candidates for city council won their races, including two incumbents, Cynthia Mota and Natalie Santos, and two political freshmen, Jeremy Binder and Cristian Pungo. At just 28 years old Pungo became the youngest person ever elected to the city council. Mota, a Dominican immigrant, attributed her victory to backlash to Trump's deportation policies.
