= 2019 Allentown mayoral special election =

2019 Allentown special mayoral election
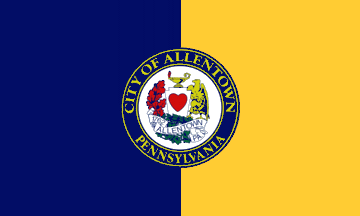
- May 19, 2019
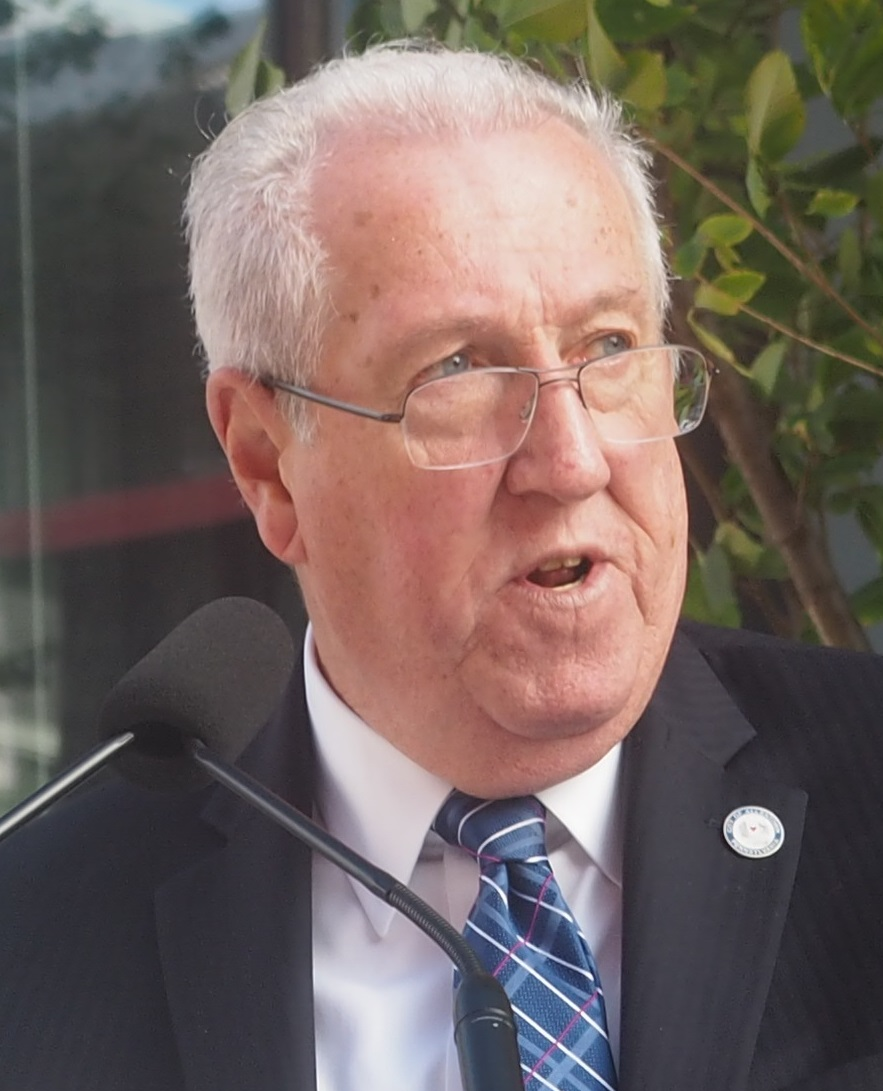

Candidate	Ray O'Connell	Timothy Ramos
Party	Democratic	Republican
Popular vote	8,315	4,111
Percentage	66.73%	32.99%
- Results by precinct O'Connell: 50–60% 60–70% 70–80% 80–90%
Mayor before election
Ray O'Connell
Democratic
Elected mayor
Ray O'Connell
Democratic

The Allentown 2019 special mayoral election was held on May 19, 2019, following the resignation of Democratic mayor Ed Pawlowski. Incumbent interim Democratic mayor Ray O'Connell defeated Republican challenger Timothy Ramos.

== Background ==
During the 2017 Allentown mayoral election, three-term mayor Ed Pawlowski was indicted by the Federal Bureau of Investigation and faced fifty-four charges, including multiple counts of conspiracy, bribery, attempted extortion, making false statements to federal officials, mail fraud, and wire fraud with some charges dating as far back as 2012. He refused to step down or stop campaigning for his fourth term as mayor. He narrowly won the election, 39.37% to his Republican challenger's 36.74% with write in votes for city councilman Ray O'Connell reaching roughly 18%.

Pawlowski was then found guilty on forty-seven charges shortly after the election on March 1, 2018. Forced to resign as mayor on March 9, 2018, he was sentenced to twenty years in federal prison.

With the office of mayor vacant, a special election was held to fill the seat. Councilman Ray O'Connell was appointed interim mayor by the city council until the election.

== Campaign ==
There was only one primary, the Democratic primary, because Republican Tim Ramos ran unopposed. There were four Democratic candidates:

- Interim mayor Ray O'Connell, who, during his brief time in office, had already become unpopular due to a 27% tax hike and a $10 million loan to cover the city budget;
- Cheryl Johnson-Watts, a Financial adviser and Allentown School Board director was a key critic of O’Connell's economic plan of increasing taxes and taking out loans to fix the budget deficit;
- Patrick Palmer, an insurance representative and political outsider who based his campaign on ensuring that low and medium density housing would be set aside during rezoning ordinance; and
- Michael Daniels, a former Constable who had not been licensed since 2017, and who ran as an anti-establishment candidate, calling for an increased police presence in the city.

Interim mayor O'Connell successfully defeated his three primary challengers, gaining 53% of the vote and advancing to the general election. He then defeated Republican challenger Ramos 66.73% to 32.99%.

== Results ==
Mayor of Allentown, Democratic primary, 2019
Party	Candidate	Votes	%
Democratic	Ray O'Connell (incumbent)	2,608	53.0%
Democratic	Cheryl Johnson-Watts	1,215	24.7%
Democratic	Patrick Palmer	641	13.0%
Democratic	Michael Daniels	457	9.3%
Total votes		4,921	100.00%

Mayor of Allentown, 2019 Special election
Party	Candidate	Votes	%
Democratic	Ray O'Connell	8,315	66.73%
Republican	Timothy Ramos	4,111	32.99%
N/A	Write-ins	34	0.27%
Total votes		12,460	100%
Democratic hold			

== See also ==
- 2019 United States elections
- List of mayors of Allentown, Pennsylvania
