= 2013 Allentown mayoral election =

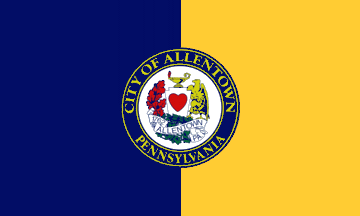
- November 5, 2013
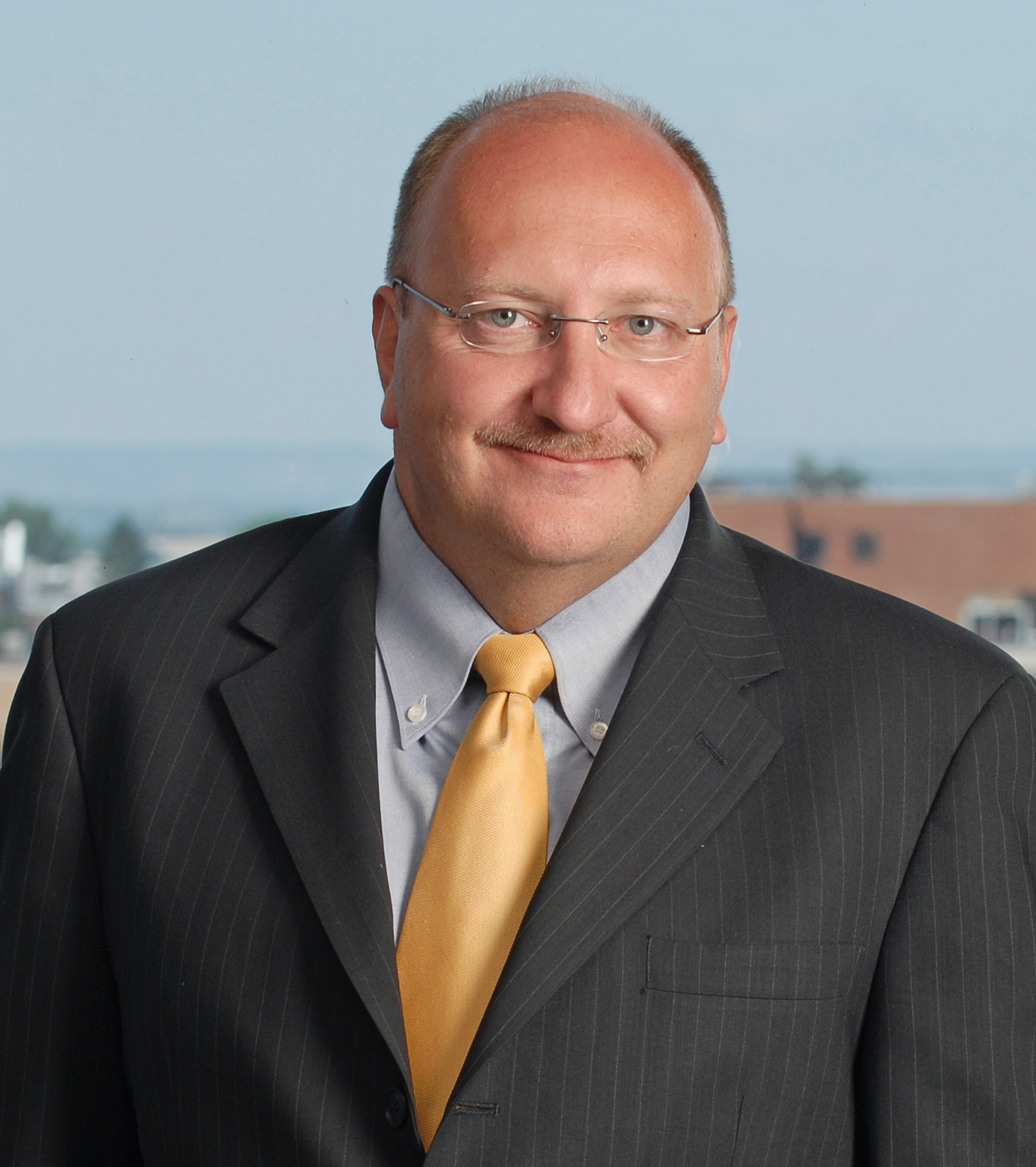

Candidate	Ed Pawlowski	William Michael Donovan
Party	Democratic	Independent
Alliance	Republican
Popular vote	5,845	3,602
Percentage	61.87%	38.13%
- Results by precinct Pawlowski: 50–60% 60–70% 70–80% 80–90% Donovan: 50–60%
Mayor before election
Ed Pawlowski
Democratic
Elected mayor
Ed Pawlowski
Democratic

The 2013 mayoral election in Allentown, Pennsylvania was held on November 5, 2013, and resulted in the incumbent mayor Ed Pawlowski, a member of the Democratic Party, being re-elected to a third term over Independent candidate William Michael Donovan.

== Background ==
Incumbent mayor Ed Pawlowski was seeking his third term as mayor, having first been elected in 2005. Simultaneously, Pawlowski would run for the Democratic nomination for governor in the 2014 Pennsylvania gubernatorial election.

== Campaign ==
Pawlowski won the Democratic primary unopposed while the Republicans failed to field any candidates. Some of Pawlowski's supporters launched a write in campaign and won the Republican nomination for him making him the first cross-filed candidate in Allentown since 1989. Despite this, Pawlowski would be challenged in the general election by former city councilmen and independent W. Michael Donovan. During the campaign Pawlowski raised $224,005 in campaign funds and vastly outspent Donovan who only raised $13,140. However, most of the money Pawlowski raised for his mayoral campaign came from galas, fundraisers, and other events for his gubernatorial campaign. Pawlowski would defeat Donovan in the general election with almost 62% of the vote.

== Results ==
Mayor of Allentown, Democratic primary, May 21, 2013.
Party	Candidate	Votes	%
Democratic	Ed Pawlowski (incumbent)	2,583	100%
Total votes		2,583	100.00%

Mayor of Allentown, Republican primary, May 21, 2013.
Party	Candidate	Votes	%
Republican	Ed Pawlowski (incumbent)	139	100%
Total votes		139	100.00%

Mayor of Allentown, November 5, 2013.
Party	Candidate	Votes	%
Democratic-Republican	Ed Pawlowski (incumbent)	5,845	61.87%
Independent	William Michael Donovan	3,602	38.13%
Total votes		9,447	100.00%

== See also ==
- 2013 United States elections
- Cross-filing
- Mayors of Allentown, Pennsylvania
