= 1997 Allentown mayoral election =

Local election in Pennsylvania, United States of America

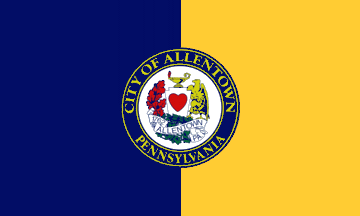
- November 4, 1997
Candidate	William L. Heydt	Martin Velazquez III
Party	Republican	Democratic
Popular vote	10,446	8,734
Percentage	54.42%	45.50%
Mayor before election
William L. Heydt
Republican
Elected mayor
William L. Heydt
Republican

The 1997 mayoral election in Allentown, Pennsylvania was held on November 4, 1997, and resulted in the Republican incumbent mayor William L. Heydt defeating Democratic challenger and city councilmen Martin Velazquez III. This election is remembered for its razor thin margin for the Democratic primary which saw Velazquez win by a singular vote against Emma Tropiano after a lengthy and hotly contested recount.

== Background ==
Incumbent Republican mayor Heydt had been elected in 1993 with 51.9% of the popular vote and vowed to not seek reelection and limit himself to a single term. However, he would go back on his promise and touting his long list of accomplishments as mayor, including a $4.8 million surplus in the city budget, a greatly expanded and equipped police force, as well as many new businesses moving into the city, as his justification to seek reelection. However, he did face a large amount of criticism for the two lengthy legal battles between the mayors office and the police department. The first was over the city's pension plan with Heydt eventually conceded to increasing the pension to 70%. And the second prevented Heydt's firing of trooper Thomas Siteman over purported bigotry.

== Campaign ==
=== Republican primary ===
Heydt's greatest challenge in the election would come from in the form of a primary election against David K. Bausch. Bausch, a businessman and former Lehigh County executive and member of the Allentown city council, had been defeated in a primary election during his time as executive and sought to do the same against Heydt despite his endorsement from the county's Republican Party. Because of this he had to finance his entire campaign out of pocket and against resistance from local Republican officials. Heydt also faced another challenger, Alton Frey. A former Democrat who switched his party affiliation for the election, Frey centered his campaign over a perceived "lack of change" in the city during Heydt's first term and vowed to combat growing privatization in the city. Heydt would defeat Bausch by just 245 votes to go on to the general election.

=== Democratic primary ===
The Democratic primary saw a three-way race against Martin Velazquez III, Emma Tropiano, and Martha E. Falk. Velazquez was a freshman city councilmen and an assimilated, second generation Puerto Rican who used his name to connect with the city's large and growing Hispanic population, despite himself not being able to speak Spanish. His father was an immigrant from Puerto Rico while his mother was Pennsylvania Dutch. He was a member of the Lehigh County Democratic Committee, a delegate to the 1996 Democratic National Convention, and was involved in the Lehigh valley Hispanic Business Council. He was given a better chance to win against Heydt in opinion polls despite running a grass-roots campaign with little support from the party. Tropiano was a four term veteran councilwomen who entered the city council promising to abolish the downtown historic district law to allow massive demolitions and construction. Unable to revoke the law as a member of the city council she hoped that being mayor would give her more political capital to achieve her goal. She also garnered the ire of the city's Hispanic population when she proclaimed that the English language should be made sole official language of the United States as well as claiming Hispanics committed 99% of Allentown's crime. She described herself as a champion of the working class and proposed outlawing sofas on front lawns and yard sales. Falk was the Lehigh County commissioner and ran on a six-point plan to implement urban renewal in Allentown. She also sought to reduce the number of at-large city council seats from seven to three and having the four seats be elected via districts to better represent the different neighborhoods of the city. However, she was heavily criticized for her fiscal policy as commissioner as the county's debt increased by $39 million during her tenure. Despite this she had the endorsement and support of the city's Democratic "kingmakers" and entrenched political elite. Initial results showed Tropiano holding a slim 30 vote victory over Velazquez with 2,656 votes to his 2,626 with Falk coming in third with 1,796. However, other results showed the lead as just being 3 singular votes, while still other results showed Velazquez leading with 3 votes. It was determined that 50 of the city's 57 voting machines where faulty and that all votes would have to be recounted by hand. After a lengthy recount, Senior Judge James N. Diefenderfer announced that Velazquez had won by a singular vote with a total of 2,681 to Tropiano's 2,680. Velazquez would be the first Latino nominee for mayor from either party.

=== General election ===
The general election between Velazquez and Heydt was hard-fought with Velazquez focusing his campaign on the shortcomings of the Heydt administration and his abrasive personality while Heydt promoted his successes as mayor namely with the budget surplus and police expansion. Attempting to turn Heydt's talking points against him, Velazquez argued that a large budget surplus was a sign of sloppy accounting, over-taxation and under utilization of public services. He proposed rebating $4.7 million in municipal funds back to the taxpayers of the city. Heydt responded by proposing a tax cut. Velazquez also argued that despite the expansion of both personal and spending to the police department, Heydt had neglected the force by failing to reduce drug use in the city and to effectively combat the city's violent gangs. Heydt responded by pinning the blame on outgoing police chief John Stefanik and pointed out his close cooperation with the DEA to fight drug related crime. Additionally, Republican candidate Frey, who Heydt beat in the primary, attempted to run a Write-in campaign. Heydt would defeat Velazquez by a comfortable margin and pledged to return Allentown to its title of “Queen City” of Pennsylvania, after he takes a post-election vacation.

== Results ==
Mayor of Allentown, Republican primary, May 20, 1997.
Party	Candidate	Votes	%
Republican	William L. Heydt	2,427	46.88%
Republican	David K. Bausch	2,182	42.15%
Republican	Alton W. Frey Jr	568	10.97%
Total votes		5,177	100.00%

Mayor of Allentown, Democratic primary, May 20, 1997.
Party	Candidate	Votes	%
Democratic	Martin Velazquez III	2,681	37.46%
Democratic	Emma Tropiano	2,680	37.45%
Democratic	Martha E. Falk	1,796	25.09%
Total votes		7,157	100.00%

Mayor of Allentown, November 4, 1997.
Party	Candidate	Votes	%
Republican	William L. Heydt	10,446	54.42%
Democratic	Martin Velazquez III	8,734	45.50%
Write-In	Alton W. Frey Jr	16	0.08%
Total votes		19,196	100.00%
Republican hold			

== Legacy ==
Heydt was the first mayor since the 1920s to win re-election to a second term at the end of their first term. As of 2023, this would be the last mayoral election in Allentown that the Republican party would win. Mayor Heydt would again refuse re-election in 2001, but this time remained faithful to his promise. Following a Republican defeat in 2001 that saw Velazquez go on to be named the new Democratic mayor Roy Afflerbach's deputy mayor, Heydt would run for a third, albeit non-consecutive term in 2005 but was handily defeated by Ed Pawlowski. It is also statistically impossible for any other Allentown election to come as close as the singular vote difference between Tropiano and Velazquez.

== See also ==
- 1997 United States elections
- Mayors of Allentown, Pennsylvania
