= Matthew Tuerk =

American politician (born 1975)

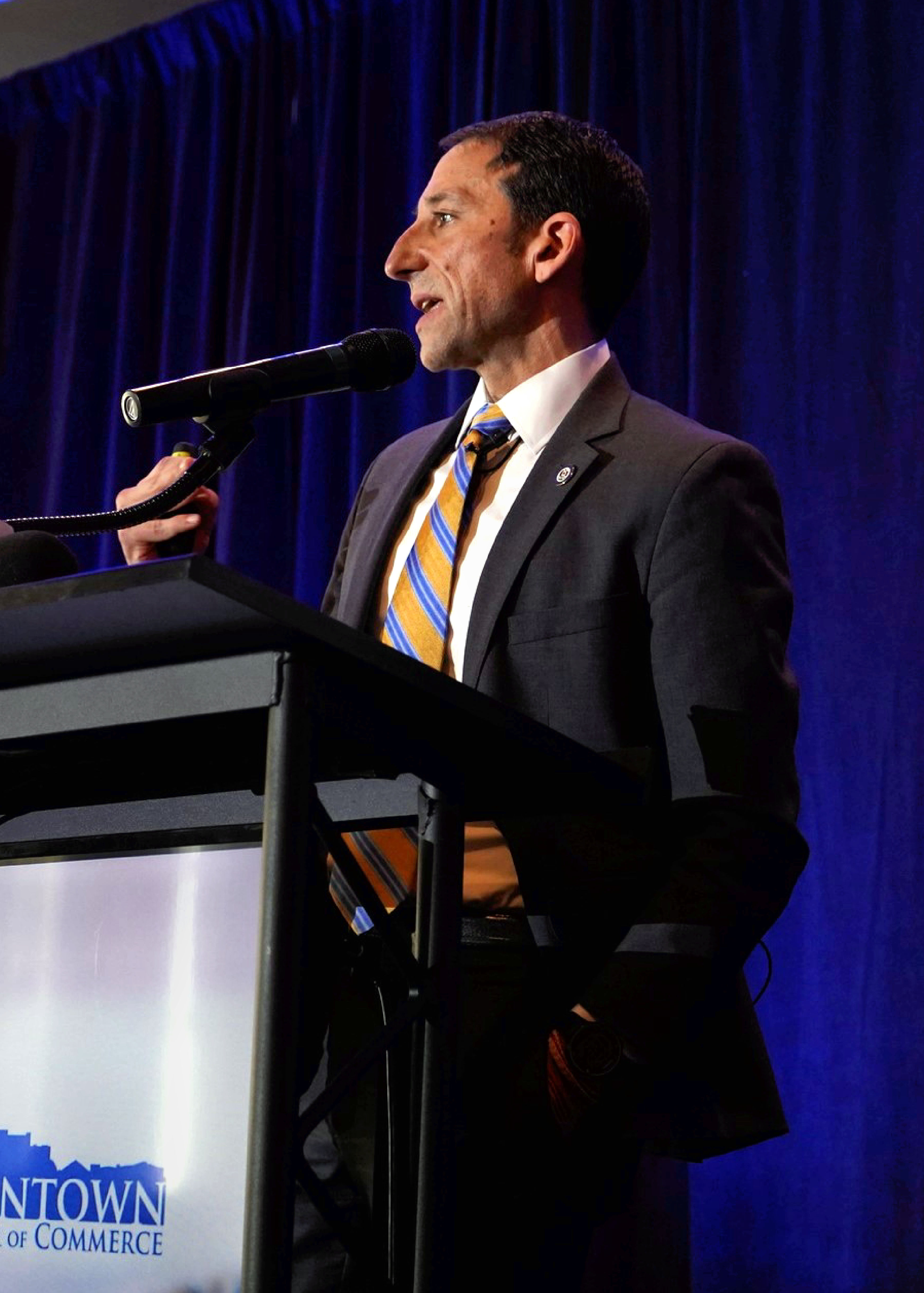
- Tuerk in 2022

43rd Mayor of Allentown
- Incumbent
- Assumed office January 3, 2022
- Preceded by: Ray O'Connell

Personal details
- Born: March 18, 1975 (age 51) East Stroudsburg, Pennsylvania, U.S
- Party: Democratic
- Spouse: Karen
- Children: 2
- Education: College of Charleston; University of South Carolina

Matthew Tuerk (born March 18, 1975) is an American politician and economic development official serving as the mayor of Allentown, Pennsylvania, since January 2022. Despite entering a crowded field with low name recognition, he was the first candidate to defeat an incumbent mayor in an Allentown primary since 1973, becoming the city's first Latino mayor. He was reelected in 2025 in a landslide.

Prior to being elected mayor, Tuerk worked at the Allentown Economic Development Corporation (AEDC) and the Lehigh Valley Economic Development Corporation (LVEDC).

== Early life and education ==
Matthew Tuerk was born March 18, 1975, in East Stroudsburg, Pennsylvania. His grandmother was a Cuban immigrant who settled in East Stroudsburg in 1946. Tuerk was raised speaking English but was surrounded by Cuban traditions and food during his childhood. His family moved from East Stroudsburg to Boulder, Colorado, in 1984.

Tuerk earned a Bachelor of Science in international business from the College of Charleston. He minored in Spanish and Latin American studies, during which time became particularly interested in Latino culture, learning to speak Spanish and traveling to Latin America.

He received an MBA with a concentration in international economic development from the Darla Moore School of Business at the University of South Carolina.

== Career ==
Tuerk spent four years working for an outdoor advertising company in Panama, and later also spent time in Nicaragua. In 2004, Tuerk and his wife Karen returned to Pennsylvania, and moved to Allentown.

Tuerk became an assistant director of the Allentown Economic Development Corporation (AEDC) in 2008 and spent five years with the organization. During his time there, Tuerk helped establish the Urban Manufacturing Alliance, a coalition of cities dedicated to strengthening their manufacturing economies. He also co-founded Make Lehigh Valley, the region's first "hackerspace" located at AEDC's Bridgeworks Enterprise Center business incubator.

In 2013, Tuerk joined the Lehigh Valley Economic Development Corporation (LVEDC), where he worked for seven years. He began with the organization as its first director of research and innovation. Two years later, in 2015, he was named vice president of economic development and marketing. In 2019, he was appointed vice president of business attraction, retention and expansion. At LVEDC, he worked in a variety of functional areas, including administration, communications, economic development, entrepreneurial startup support, investor relations, marketing, and research. In October 2020, he resigned from LVEDC, and announced his candidacy for mayor of Allentown a week later.

Tuerk was the chairman the Lehigh-Northampton Airport Authority board of governors, the governing body of the Lehigh Valley International Airport. He was also a member of the board of associates executive committee at Muhlenberg College in Allentown. He served previously served on the board of trustees at Moravian Academy, treasurer of the Old Allentown Preservation Association, and as a member of the Allentown City Shade Tree Commission.

=== Mayoral campaign ===
On October 6, 2020, approximately a week after resigning his position with LVEDC, Tuerk announced his candidacy as a Democratic candidate for Mayor of Allentown in the 2021 Allentown mayoral election. He was the first candidate to enter the race in an election anticipated to have multiple candidates. Tuerk was relatively unknown to voters at the beginning of the primary election. A poll commissioned by a local developer projected Tuerk to win only 1% of the Democratic vote, and a separate poll by The Morning Call and Muhlenberg College in April 2021, just one month before the primary election, found only one in 10 residents were familiar with Tuerk. The Morning Call newspaper called the Democratic primary race "historically competitive", with Tuerk running against three primary candidates already holding office in the city, Mayor Ray O'Connell, City Council President Julio Juridy, and Councilwoman Ce-Ce Gerlach.

Tuerk raised campaign funds to allocate to improving his name recognition, and focused on meeting voters face-to-face or by phone, setting a goal of talking to 150 voters on weekdays, 250 on Saturdays, and at least 200 on Sundays. He also sought to connect with voters who requested mail-in ballots in what, in response to the COVID-19 pandemic, was the first municipal primary to allow no-excuse voting by mail. Tuerk raised more money than any of his three primary candidates, and spent $92,000 out of the $209,000 spent between the four primary candidates combined heading into the final two weeks of the primary election.

In the May 2021 primary, Tuerk received 2,064 votes, defeating O'Connell and Guridy by less than two percentage points, and Gerlach by three points. The Morning Call reported that Tuerk performed well in all of the city's precincts, but especially well in precincts where voter turnout was relatively high. He won six of the nine precincts in which turnout exceeded 34%. Among all candidates, Tuerk received the most votes by mail, receiving 864 mail-in votes. The election marked the first time an incumbent mayor in Allentown lost a primary since James P. Ritter defeated Clifford Bartholomew in 1973.

In the November 2021 general election, Tuerk faced Republican opponent Tim Ramos. Tuerk won the general election with 8,206 votes and 64.13% of the vote, compared to 4,299 and 33.6% for Ramos.

== First mayoral term ==
On January 3, 2022, Tuerk was sworn in as Allentown mayor, becoming the first Latino mayor in the city's history.

=== Pedestrian fatalities & safe streets initiative ===
Tuerk has made safe streets and pedestrian safety initiatives a priority for the city, and vowed to end pedestrian related fatalities in the city. Through the support of federal representatives, the city received grant funding towards the development of a strategic plan. The city had witnessed five pedestrian-involved accidents in 2022.

=== NAACP allegations ===
On July 15, 2023, the Allentown NAACP sent a five-page letter to local media and the City of Allentown describing instances of alleged discrimination and harassment within the city. The letter put forth claims that white police officers utilized racial slurs against their African-American colleagues, white supervisors verbally attacked employees of color, an employee was terminated for speaking out against racism and employees of color were subjected to higher dress standards than their white counterparts. It stated that Tuerk failed to respond to acts of discrimination and racism and his administration did not properly manage complaints about these acts from city employees. At city council meetings, residents and employees demanded an investigation and urged council to hire an outside firm. Karen Ocasio, a city employee in the human resources department, spoke to council indicating there were many employees experiencing problems and that issues were prevalent within the city. The city council voted of 7–0 to authorize the city to hire an outside firm to fully investigate these allegations and prepare a report for the purposes of transparency for city residents.

=== 2024 budget impasse ===
On October 16, 2023, Tuerk presented his 2024 budget which called for a 6.9% property tax increase and increased city trash fees by $120 annually. The budget called for 21 new positions in the city, even as city officials acknowledged that revenue growth in previous years had not been sufficient to balance city finances. When it was clear that the City Council wouldn't approve his proposed budget, Tuerk made a last second attempt to lower the proposed increase to 4.57%.

This proposal failed to win over council members. On November 4, 2023, Allentown City Council voted 5–2 to reject the mayor's proposed budget and pass a budget with no tax increase, citing concerns about rising costs and inflation. The City Council also allocated the last of the American Rescue Plan funds, with money being allocated towards the renovation of public safety facilities and community organizations and nonprofits. Allentown residents at the meeting complained that the city had failed to provide funding for local non-profits and council members responded by allocating additional rescue plan funding to local community organizations.

On November 8, Tuerk vetoed the City Council's proposed budget, leaving the city without a budget for the upcoming year. He then suggested a 2% tax increase. Genesis Ortega, the city's communications director, said they might have to cut popular city programs like the Lights in the Parkway, a traditional holiday lights display that attracts tens of thousands of visitors, and Fourth of July fireworks, if tax increase was not passed.

On November 15, 2023, City Council met to attempt to override Tuerk's veto. The effort failed with a 4–3 vote in favor of overriding his veto, meaning that the city remained without a budget. With the deadline looming, Council met on December 12, 2023, to make a final attempt at passing a budget. By a vote of 4-3 City Council voted down the mayor's final proposal of a 2% increase. The City Council opted to take $762,000 from the city's general fund revenue to fund the budgetary gap brought on by passing a budget without a tax increase. Tuerk opted not to veto the council's proposed budget allowing it to take effect. Tuerk warned residents would see higher tax increases in the future and expressed disapproval over council's decision to use general fund revenue to fund government operations, calling their actions short-sighted.

=== Vote of no confidence ===
On November 21, 2023, in the midst of the city's budget impasse, Tuerk fired Karen Ocasio, a city employee who had filed multiple complaints regarding discrimination and was an early supporter of City Council's investigation into allegations of racism and mismanagement. On December 6, 2023, Allentown City Council met to consider the vote of no confidence against Tuerk. The vote of no confidence resolution made specific claims against Tuerk and his administration alleging the following as justification for the vote stating "Tuerk’s ineffective leadership has placed the government of the City of Allentown in a critically unfavorable light in the community." The resolution further stated that the mayor "has lacked leadership in key areas — handling personnel responsibilities and management; managing a budget within parameters established by a majority of council members, and failing community engagement that includes the entirety of community interests." At the urging of city residents, the vote of no confidence was successful through a council vote of 4–3. Tuerk became the second mayor of Allentown in less than 10 years to have a vote of no confidence issued against him.

=== Allentown Recompete Initiative ===
On December 21, 2023, Tuerk announced Allentown was among 22 finalists to potentially receive millions in federal funding for economically distressed areas. The city received $500,000 grant to help the city develop its proposal through the Biden Administration's Economic Development Administration's Recompete Program. The city planned to use the funds to invest in the 1st and 6th wards of Allentown which feature some of the poorest census tracts. The city intended to use the funding to address barriers such as transportation, childcare, and training.

In August 2024, Allentown's proposal was one of six winners chosen by EDA from a pool of 565 applicants. Allentown received a $20 million grant to be spent over 5 years.

== Personal life ==
Tuerk's wife Karen is a lecturer in environmental science at Muhlenberg College. They have two children. He speaks four languages: English, Spanish, Portuguese, and French.
