= Cross-filing =

Election filing in multiple parties

In American politics, cross-filing (similar to the concept of electoral fusion) occurs when a candidate runs in the primary election of not only their own party, but also that of one or more other parties, generally in the hope of reducing or eliminating their competition at the general election. It was in effect in California from 1913 to 1959, when it was abolished, and has been used in other states, most significantly in New York and New Hampshire, where it is still in effect.

In New York, the main candidates are usually the Democratic and Republican nominees, and the support of various minor parties is demonstrated by winning their nomination as well. For example, Republican nominees often attempt to win the nomination of the Conservative Party of New York, and Democratic nominees often attempt to win the New York Working Families Party nomination as well. One rare exception was in 1944, when New York Congressman Vito Marcantonio was successful in winning both the Republican and Democratic Party primaries, assuring his re-election.

== California, 1913-1959 ==
In 1909, California introduced the direct primary election in its elections. The state's requirement that candidates in primary elections certify that they had supported a particular party in the previous general election was struck down by the California Supreme Court in 1909, in a case involving the Socialist Party of America. While the California State Legislature attempted to institute a looser test in 1911, by 1913, there was no longer any restriction on candidates filing in multiple primaries. The cross-filing provision was added to a previously debated primary bill by members of the administration of Governor Hiram Johnson, who had previously run (on separate occasions) with the Republican Party and the Progressive Party.

In 1917 and 1919, the legislature barred a candidate who lost their own party's nomination from running as a member of any other party, and allowed the state committee of the affected party to fill any vacancies on their ticket. In combination with statutes that placed the incumbent first on the ballot and designated them by their title, these ballot rules gave a heavy advantage to incumbents.

In 1946, Governor Earl Warren, eight other state officials, 12 of the state's 23 U.S. representatives, and approximately three-quarters of incumbent state legislators seeking re-election were elected by winning both major primaries through cross-filing. In 1948, US Representative Richard Nixon, facing no Republican primary opponent, cross-filed and defeated Stephen Zetterberg in the Democratic primary.

=== Movement to abolish ===
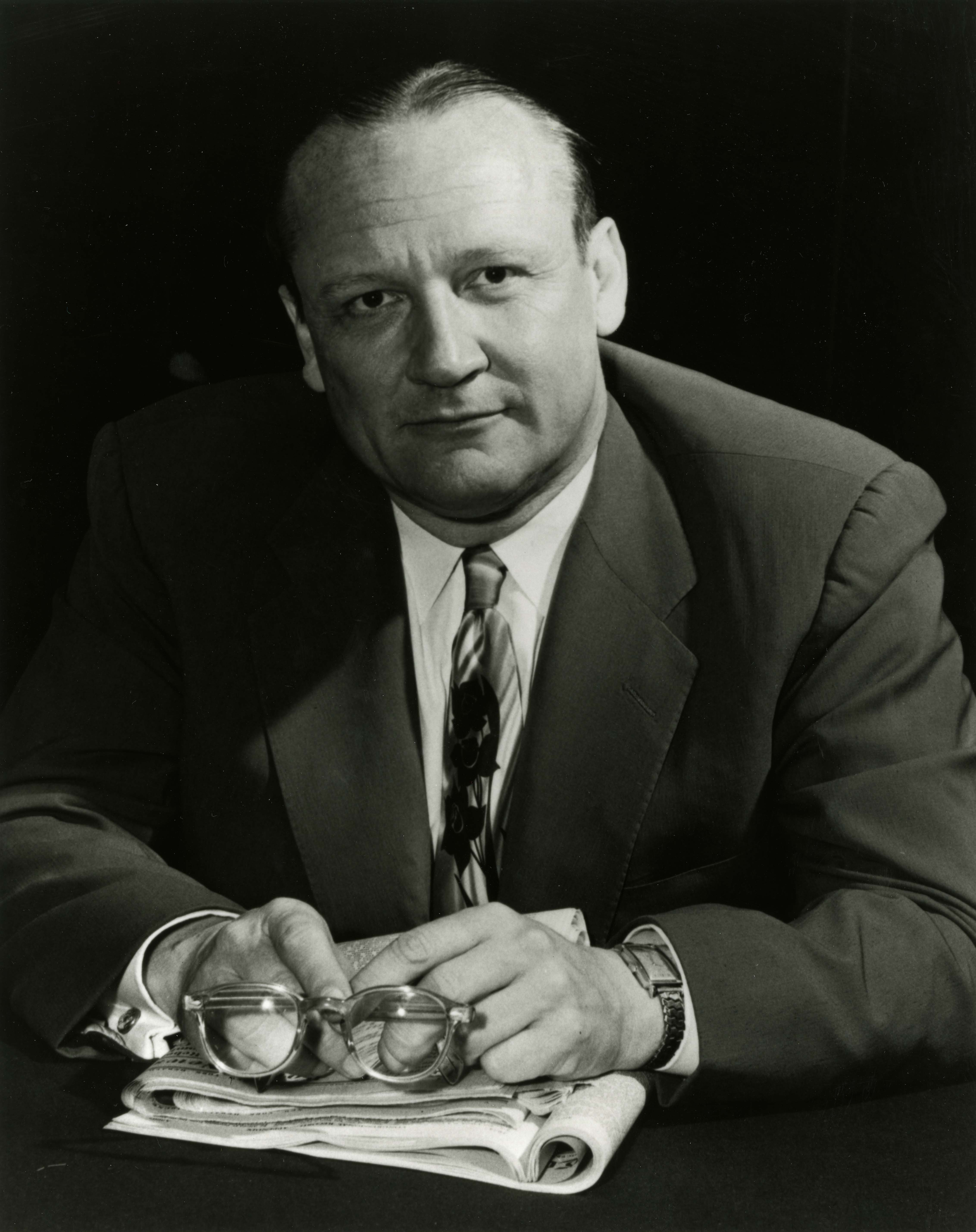
Senator William Knowland, a Republican, won the nomination of both major parties in the 1952 Senate election, bringing increased attention to the cross-filing system.

In 1952, incumbent Republican US Senator William Knowland won the nomination of both parties. This marked the low point of post-war Democratic political fortunes in California, and brought into sharp focus the results of cross-filing. Though the majority of California voters were registered Democrats, there had only been one Democratic Governor in the 20th century, and Republicans held majorities in both houses of the Legislature and 111 of the 162 elective partisan offices in the state.

That same year, the Democrats, with funding from oil millionaire Edwin Pauley, filed a ballot initiative to abolish cross-filing. In an attempt to defeat this initiative, the Republican-controlled legislature proposed a competing measure, retaining cross-filing, but requiring candidates to list their party affiliation on all ballots. The Democratic initiative was defeated and the Republican measure won. But thereafter, Republicans running in a Democratic primary would be labeled Republican – a great disadvantage in Democratic districts. This marked the beginning of the end of cross-filing.

1952 also saw the national defeat of Democratic presidential nominee Adlai Stevenson II. After the election, Stevenson enthusiasts, most of whom were volunteer activists rather than professional politicians, formed the California Democratic Council (CDC). The CDC was a grassroots organization of Democratic clubs, intended to prevent the Republicans from continuing to exploit cross-filing.

Cross-filing was finally abolished in California in 1959, after the Democrats swept to power in the 1958 election, with Pat Brown becoming the first Democratic Governor since Culbert Olson left office in 1943.

== Pennsylvania ==
Cross-filing is allowed in municipal elections in Pennsylvania; however, it is not allowed in national or statewide elections. It is most commonly used in school board elections and for the election of municipal judges.

In 2013, Allentown, the third largest city in the state, had its incumbent Democratic mayor, Ed Pawlowski, cross-file for the mayoral election of that year where he defeated an independent challenger. This was the first and only time that there was a cross-filed candidate in an Allentown mayoral election.

There have been several efforts to eliminate the practice in the state, mostly from Republican politicians. Two attempts were made in 2016 and 2018 by Justin Simmons (R). The first attempt died in the Pennsylvania House of Representatives. The second passed, however, the Pennsylvania State Senate never voted on the bill and it died when the legislative session expired. In January 2022 Marci Mustello (R) sponsored another bill that would outlaw the practice.
