= 1997 Houston mayoral election =

- November 4, 1997 (first round); December 6, 1997 (runoff)
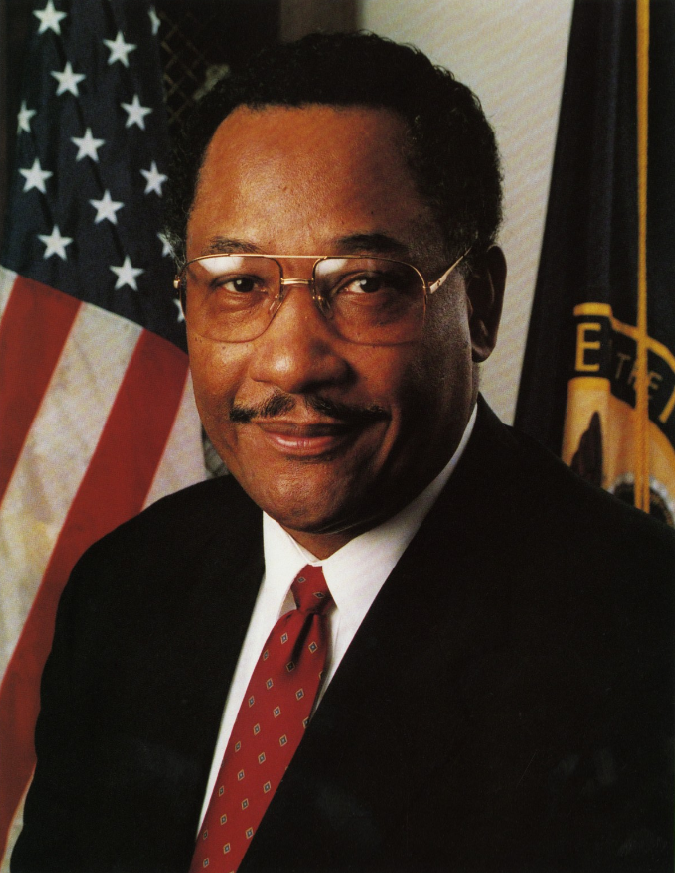

Candidate	Lee Brown	Robert Mosbacher
First round	126,5478; 41%	90,004; 29%
Runoff	156,169; 53%	140,321; 47%
Candidate	George Greanias	Gracie Saenz
First round	52,937; 17%	21,752; 7%
Runoff	Eliminated	Eliminated
Mayor before election
Lee Brown
Elected mayor
Lee Brown

The 1997 Houston mayoral election took place on November 4, 1997 to elect the successor to term-limited Mayor Bob Lanier. With no candidate receiving a majority of the votes, a run-off election was held on December 6, 1997. The ultimate result was Lee Brown winning the election. The election was officially non-partisan.

Lee Brown won the run-off election, making him the first African-American mayor of Houston.

== Candidates ==
- Richard Barry
- Lee Brown, former Director of the National Drug Control Policy
- Brenard Calkins
- George Greanias
- Helen Huey
- Jeane-Claude Lanau
- Robert Mosbacher, local businessman
- Gracie Saenz

== Results ==
Houston mayoral election, 1997
Candidate	Votes	%
Lee Brown	126,547	41%
Robert Mosbacher	90,004	29%
George Greanias	52,937	17%
Gracie Saenz	21,752	7%
Helen Huey	10,775	4%
Richard Barry	3,739	1%

Houston mayoral election, 1997 run-off
Candidate	Votes	%
Lee Brown	156,169	53%
Robert Mosbacher	140,321	47%
