= Roger MacLean =

American police officer and politician

Acting Mayor of Allentown, Pennsylvania
- In office March 9, 2018 – March 29, 2018
- Preceded by: Ed Pawlowski
- Succeeded by: Ray O'Connell

Chief of the Allentown Police Department
- In office 2006 – September 6, 2013
- Preceded by: Joseph Blackburn
- Succeeded by: Joseph Hanna

Personal details
- Political party: Republican (before 2014, 2025–present); Democratic (2014-2024)

Roger MacLean is an American police officer and politician who was president of the Allentown, Pennsylvania City Council and served as acting Allentown mayor until March 29, 2018. MacLean became the acting mayor on March 9, 2018 following the resignation of Ed Pawlowski, who was convicted on March 1, 2018 on 47 felony charges related to a pay-to-play scheme involving his asking for campaign donations in exchange for city contracts and favors.

From 2006 to 2013, MacLean served as the chief of police of the Allentown Police Department. In 2015, he was elected to Allentown's City Council, defeating incumbent Joe Davis.

== Biography ==
=== Personal life and education ===
MacLean graduated from William Allen High School in Allentown, Pennsylvania. He earned a Master's degree in criminal justice from DeSales University in Center Valley, Pennsylvania.

=== Allentown Police Department ===
From 1972 until 2013, Roger MacLean served as a police officer with the Allentown Police Department, including his final eight years as Chief of Police. He graduated from both the FBI National Academy and the FBI Law Enforcement Executive Development Seminar.

MacLean joined the Allentown Police Department in 1972 as a cadet. In 1974, he was promoted to a commissioned officer and served within the department's tactical squad, 1st Platoon, and the mounted patrol.

In 1982, Allentown Police Chief Carson S. Gable demoted MacLean and three other police officers following accusations by then Allentown mayor Joseph Daddona that the quartet were part of a group of supporters of the previous police chief, Arthur Allender. The four were also accused by the mayor of bullying behavior, which damaged department morale and operated outside of the command. MacLean and his colleagues filed a lawsuit against the city in response, denying the allegation against them and accusing the Daddona administration of demoting them because they had not supported the mayor during his election campaign. MacLean and the other officers eventually won their lawsuit and were each awarded $125,000 in damages in 1988.

MacLean was further promoted to the positions of detective sergeant in 1984 and patrol lieutenant in 1990. He commanded the 2nd and 3rd Platoons until his 1997 reassignment as supervisor of the investigation division's B Team.

In 1994, MacLean joined with 18 other Allentown police captains and lieutenants in lawsuit against the city. The 19 plaintiffs charged that the city government had denied them pay raises that would have equaled the senior members of the police union, the Fraternal Order of Police. The officers, including MacLean, won the lawsuit in 1996.

In 1997, MacLean and two other police officers filed another suit against the city. The trio charged that then Allentown mayor William Heydt denied them promotions within the police department because they had won the previous 1994 lawsuit. The city reached a legal settlement with MacLean and two other officers. As part of the settlement, MacLean $20,000 and six-months free rent at a property owned by the city of Allentown.

MacLean rose to become second in command of the Allentown Police Department's Emergency Response Team. He also taught courses at the Allentown Police Academy.

In 2001, Allentown Mayor William Heydt, who was near the end of his second term, appointed MacLean as the city's acting police chief. Heydt's successor, Mayor Roy Afflerbach, who took office in January 2002, replaced MacLean with a permanent police chief, Stephen L. Kuhn.

MacLean served as patrol captain from 2002 until his appointment as Chief of the Allentown Police Department by Mayor Ed Pawlowski in 2006. From 1972 to 2006, MacLean received six departmental commendations, including three for bravery and heroism.

In January 2006, new Mayor Ed Pawlowski, who had been elected in 2005, appointed MacLean as the new Police Chief of Allentown, replacing outgoing Chief Joseph Blackburn. MacLean was a 31-year veteran of the police force at the time.

MacLean retired as police chief of Allentown on September 6, 2013 after four decades with the police force. Assistant Police Chief Joseph Hanna was named interim Police Chief until a permanent replacement for MacLean could be appointed.

On September 16, 2013, just days after his retirement from the Allentown Police Department, MacLean began a new job as the chief investigator of the Lehigh County Regional Intelligence and Investigation Center (RIIC).

=== Political career ===
In 2014, MacLean switched his party affiliation from Republican to Democratic just before applying for a vacancy on the Allentown City Council. However, another candidate was selected to fill the vacant city council seat instead of MacLean. One year later, MacLean was elected to the Allentown City Council by defeating incumbent councilman Joe Davis in the 2015 election.

In 2016, MacLean voted a against a budget resolution, saying it increased Allentown's existing budget deficit. He was also one of just two council members who opposed a new city stormwater fee. Following the 2017 indictment of Mayor Ed Pawlowski on 54 pay-to-play charges, MacLean broke with his city council colleagues to oppose a resolution which urged federal investigator to speed up their investigation of Pawlowski. MacLean also voted against a proposal to hire an attorney to consult on potentially removing Mayor Pawlowski from office. Though he voted against these proposals, MacLean and Pawlowski had a strained relationship dating back to his tenure as police chief.

On January 2, 2018, MacLean was unanimously elected President of the Allentown City Council by its members. The leadership role on the city council meant that MacLean would become acting mayor in the event that Allentown Mayor Ed Pawlowski resigned or was removed from office. MacLean's election as city council president came just weeks before Mayor Pawlowski was scheduled to go on trial, starting January 16, 2018, on 54 pay-to-play charges.

On March 1, 2018, Mayor Ed Pawlowski was convicted on 47 of the 54 charges related to pay-to-play scheme he operated from office. Pawloski's convictions, all felonies, included conspiracy, as well as multiple counts of bribery, attempted extortion, making false statements to federal officials, honest services fraud, mail fraud, and wire fraud. Pawloski resigned from office on Thursday, March 9, 2018. In accordance with the city's home charter rule, MacLean became acting Mayor of Allentown on March 9 upon Pawlowski's resignation. MacLean served as acting mayor until March 29, 2018, when Pawlowski's permanent successor, Ray O'Connell, was chosen. O'Connell will serve until the 2019 mayoral election.
