= 2025 Lehigh County Executive election =

- November 4, 2025

Nominee	Joshua Siegel	Roger MacLean
Party	Democratic	Republican
Popular vote	57,008	36,932
Percentage	60.69%	39.31%
- Precinct results Siegel: 50–60% 60–70% 70–80% 80–90% MacLean: 50–60% 60–70% Tie: 50%
County Executive before election
Phillips Armstrong
Democratic
Elected County Executive
Joshua Siegel
Democratic

The 2025 Lehigh County Executive election were held on November 4, 2025. Incumbent County Executive Phillips Armstrong was term-limited and could not seek a third consecutive term. State Representative Joshua Siegel won the Democratic primary to succeed him unopposed. In the Republican primary, former Allentown City Councilman and Police Chief Roger MacLean narrowly defeated former Allentown School Board Director Mike Welsh, 52–48 percent. Siegel defeated MacLean by a wide margin in the general election.

== Democratic primary ==
=== Candidates ===
- Joshua Siegel, State Representative

==== Endorsements ====
Joshua Siegel

County officials

- Gavin Holihan, Lehigh County District Attorney (Republican)

==== Results ====
Democratic primary
Party	Candidate	Votes	%
Democratic	Joshua Siegel	23,055	99.38
Democratic	Scattering	144	0.62
Total votes		23,199	100.00

== Republican primary ==
=== Candidates ===
- Roger MacLean, former Allentown City Councilman, former Allentown Police Chief
- Mike Welsh, former Allentown School Board Director

==== Withdrawn ====
- Justin Simmons, former State Representative

=== Results ===
Results by precinct MacLean: 50–60%; 60–70%; 70–80%; 80–90%; Welsh: 50–60%; 60–70%; 70–80%; 80–90%; Tie: 50%

Republican primary
Party	Candidate	Votes	%
Republican	Roger MacLean	7,713	52.00
Republican	Mike Welsh	6,997	47.18
Republican	Scattering	119	0.80
Total votes		14,829	100.00

== General election ==
=== Candidates ===
- Joshua Siegel, State Representative (Democratic)
- Roger MacLean, former Allentown City Councilman, former Allentown Police Chief (Republican)

=== Results ===
2025 Lehigh County Executive election
Party	Candidate	Votes	%
Democratic	Joshua Siegel	57,007	60.69
Republican	Roger MacLean	36,932	39.31
Total votes		93,409	100.00
Democratic hold			
