= 2017 Allentown mayoral election =

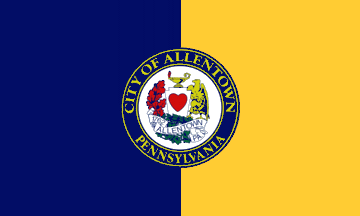
- November 7, 2017
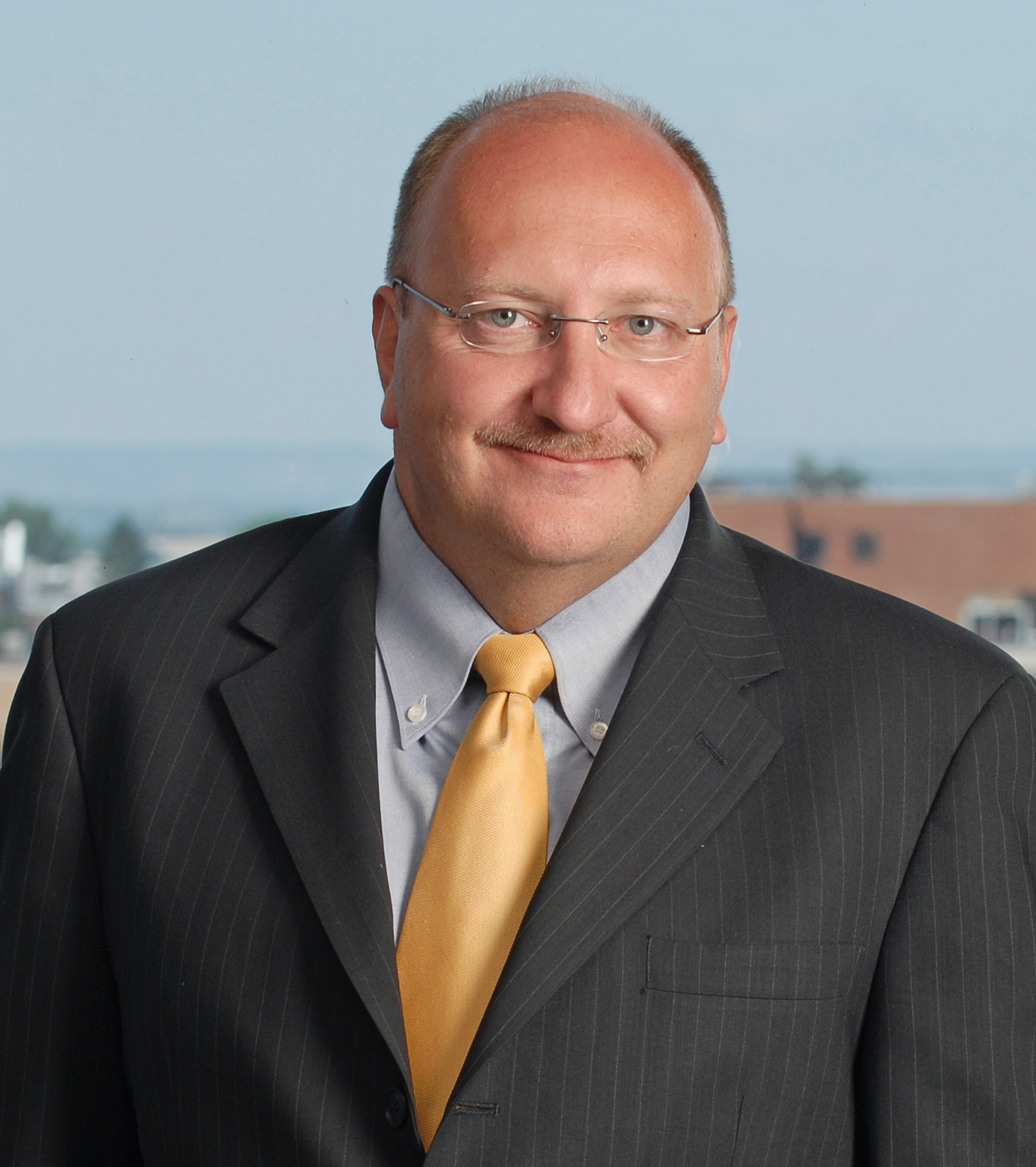

Candidate	Ed Pawlowski	Nat Hyman
Party	Democratic	Republican
Popular vote	4,758	4,440
Percentage	39.37%	36.74%
- Results by precinct Pawlowski: 30–40% 40-50% 50–60% 60–70% 70–80% 80–90% Hyman: 30–40% 40-50% 50–60% Tie: 30–40%
Mayor before election
Ed Pawlowski
Democratic
Elected mayor
Ed Pawlowski
Democratic

The 2017 mayoral election in Allentown, Pennsylvania was held on November 7, 2017, and resulted in the incumbent mayor Ed Pawlowski, a member of the Democratic Party, being re-elected to a fourth term over Republican Party candidate Nat Hyman.

== Background ==
Pawlowski was seeking his fourth term as Mayor, having been first elected in 2005.

== Campaign ==
The Republican nominee was Nat Hyman, a jeweler and real estate developer. Hyman was the first Republican candidate to make an Allentown mayoral election competitive in a decade. Common Sense Independent Party candidate John Richard Ingram, also a real estate developer, and Solomon Tembo, the candidate of the King Solomon Tembo party, were also on the ballot. Ray O'Connell, the president of the Allentown City Council, also ran as a write-in candidate. O'Connell; Siobhan "Sam" Bennett, who had been upset in the 2005 and the 2001 democratic primaries; Lehigh County Commissioner David Jones; Joshua Siegel; Charlie Thiel, a member of the Allentown school board; and Nathan Woodring also sought the Democratic Party nomination. Luiz Garcia also sought the Republican nomination.

No debates were held during the election; instead the candidates engaged in retail politics. Pawlowski worked to increase turnout among Allentown's Hispanic and Syrian populations.

In July 2017 Pawlowski was the subject of a 54-count indictment that alleged that he conspired to provide municipal contracts in return for campaign contributions, dinners and tickets to sports events.

== Results ==
Mayor of Allentown, Democratic primary, 2017
Party	Candidate	Votes	%
Democratic	Ed Pawlowski (incumbent)	1,702	28.20%
Democratic	Ray O'Connell	1,377	22.82%
Democratic	Charles F. Thiel	1,333	22.09%
Democratic	Siobhan Sam Bennett	719	11.91%
Democratic	David Jones	575	9.53%
Democratic	Joshua Siegel	295	4.89%
Democratic	Nathan L. Woodring	34	0.56%
Total votes		6,035	100.00%

Mayor of Allentown, Republican primary, 2017
Party	Candidate	Votes	%
Republican	Nat Hyman	1,464	68.32%
Republican	Luiz Garcia	679	31.68%
Total votes		2,143	100.00%

Mayor of Allentown, 2017 general election
Party	Candidate	Votes	%
Democratic	Ed Pawlowski (incumbent)	4,758	39.37%
Republican	Nat Hyman	4,440	36.74%
Independent	John Richard Ingram	489	4.05%
Independent	Solomon Tembo	200	1.65%
	write-ins	2,199	18.19%
Total votes		12,086	100.00%
Democratic hold			

== Aftermath ==
Pawlowski resigned in March 2018 following his conviction on corruption charges. The City Council selected O'Connell to succeed Pawlowski later that month.

== See also ==
- 2017 United States elections
- List of mayors of Allentown, Pennsylvania
