= Allentown Parking Authority =

Coordinates: 40.600478°N 75.478153°W

Agency overview
- Headquarters: 603 West Linden Street; Allentown, Pennsylvania 18101
- Website: www.allentownparking.com

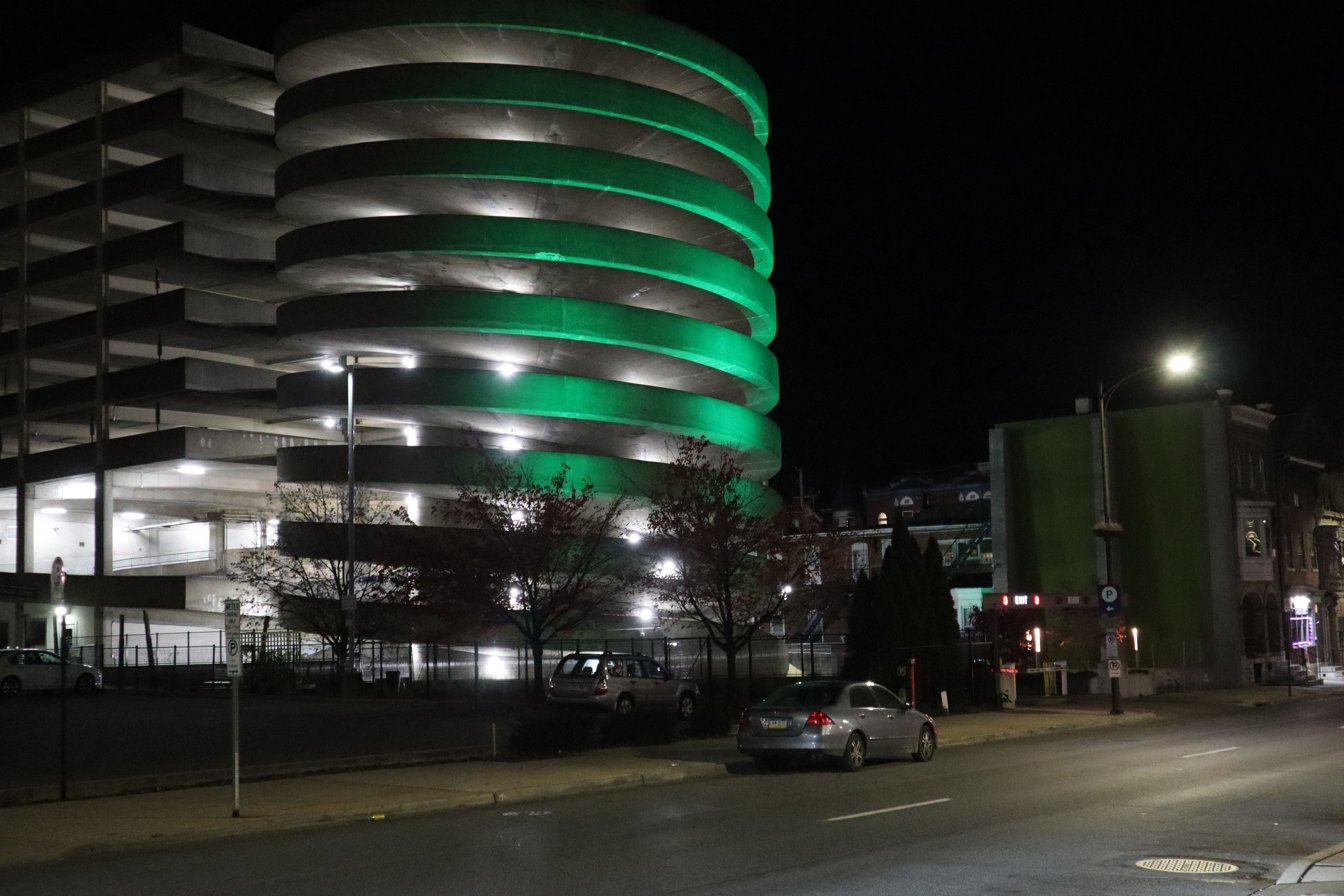
The Spiral Deck, an Allentown parking facility at 836 Linden St.

The Allentown Parking Authority is responsible for both off and on-street parking within the City of Allentown, Pennsylvania.

The Allentown Parking Authority owns and manages five parking garages in Center City Allentown and leases 29 surface lots plus one parking ramp which make up a total of over 4,020 parking spaces.

The Allentown Parking Authority is responsible for the enforcement of both City and State parking regulations, by way of parking tickets, towing, wheel booting, and impounding vehicles.

The Allentown Parking Authority currently regulates over 1,500 parking meters in the city.

== Criticisms ==
Residents have criticized the Allentown Parking Authority for targeting low-income families living in Center City Allentown by way of excessive fines and unnecessary meter parking.

The Allentown Parking Authority has also been criticized for disrupting commerce in Allentown’s downtown shopping district by overzealously ticketing during standard business hours and unnecessary meter parking.

The Allentown Parking Authority has also been criticized for indirectly implementing a so-called ticketing quota" by budgeting its operations via revenue generated by ticketing vehicles

The Allentown Parking Authority has also been criticized for wasteful spending and flaunting its high-priced "Parking Enforcement Technology" while public schools in the Allentown School District are perceived as under-funded
