= Ray O'Connell =

American politician

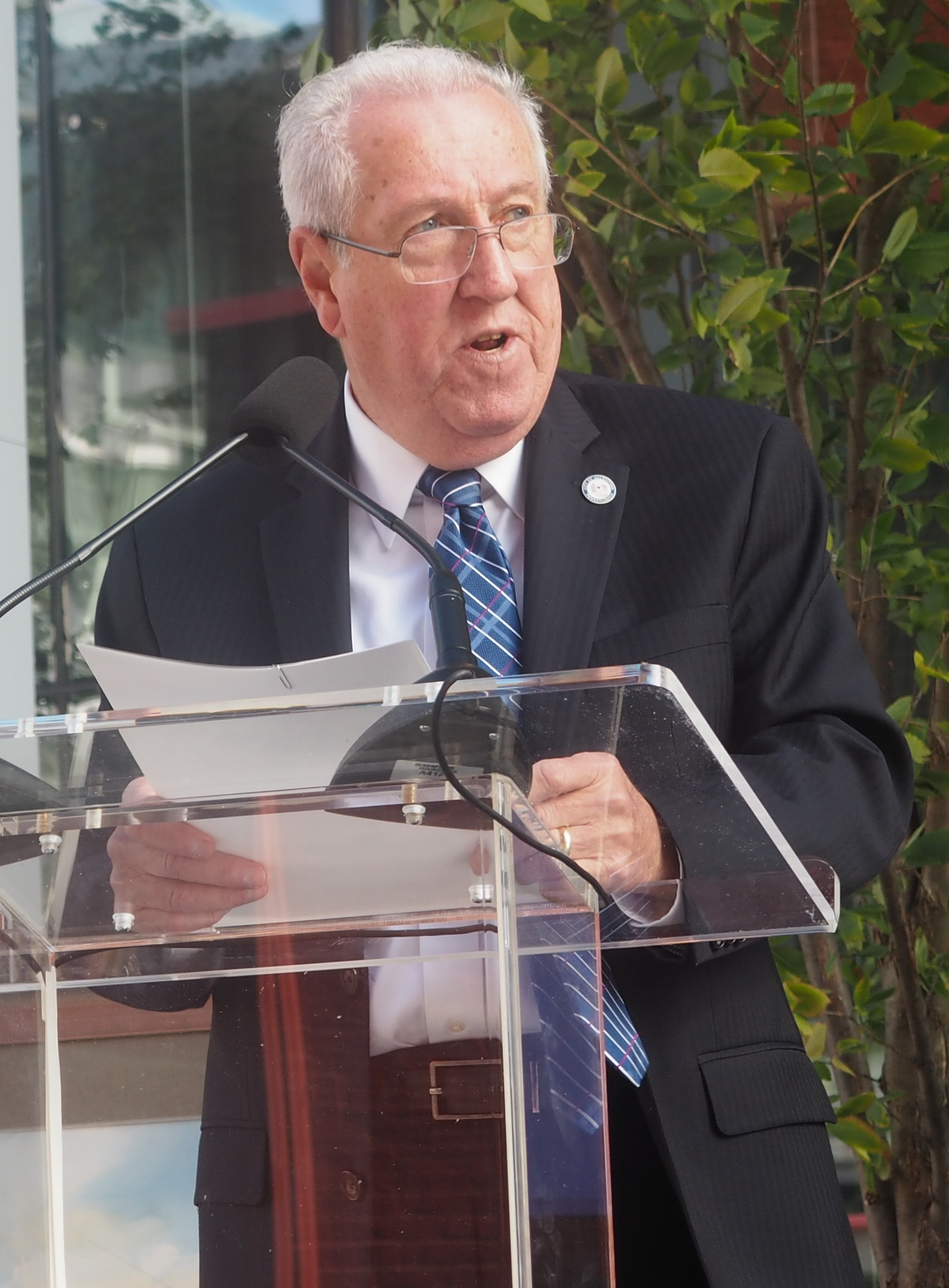
- O'Connell in October 2019

42nd Mayor of Allentown
- In office March 29, 2018 – January 3, 2022
- Preceded by: Roger MacLean (acting)
- Succeeded by: Matthew Tuerk

Personal details
- Born: Raymond D. O'Connell; December 10, 1949 (age 76)
- Party: Democratic
- Spouse: Mary Beth
- Children: 2
- Education: Kutztown University; Lehigh University

Ray O'Connell is an American politician who served as the 42nd Mayor of Allentown, Pennsylvania. He assumed the office on March 29, 2018 following the resignation of former mayor Ed Pawlowski.

O'Connell was selected to serve as mayor by the Allentown City Council in a 4-to-3 vote.

== Biography ==
Prior to taking office as mayor, O'Connell was an educator and the executive director of secondary education for the Allentown School District and served as president of the Allentown City Council from 2015 until 2018.

O'Connell previously ran for mayor in 2017 in both the Democratic primary and as a write-in candidate in the general election, losing to incumbent mayor Pawlowski in both. O'Connell ran for election to finish Pawlowski’s mayoral term in 2019, and won the Democratic primary for the special election on May 21. He won the election to complete the term by a 2-to-1 margin in the general election on November 5, 2019.

In 2019, he announced that he would not seek re-election in 2021, but announced a bid for re-election in 2020.

O'Connell lost his re-election primary to former economic development official Matthew Tuerk.
