= 2001 Allentown mayoral election =

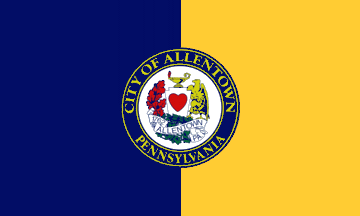
- November 6, 2001
Candidate	Roy Afflerbach	Robert Lovett
Party	Democratic	Republican
Popular vote	8,947	8,034
Percentage	52.69%	47.31%
Mayor before election
William L. Heydt
Republican
Elected mayor
Roy Afflerbach
Democratic

The 2001 mayoral election in Allentown, Pennsylvania was held on November 6, 2001, and resulted in the Democrat and former state senator Roy Afflerbach, being elected over Republican challenger and businessman, Bob Lovett. Since this election there has never been a Republican mayor of Allentown.

== Background ==
Two term mayor William L. Heydt announced on December 22, 2000, that he would not be seeking re-election to a third term. Heydt who had been re-elected in 1997 with 54.42% stated that it was time for him to move on and spend more time with his family. He would go on to run as the Republican candidate again in 2005.

== Campaign ==
=== Democratic primary ===
The Democratic primary in 2001 was one of the most competitive elections in the city's history with the second thinnest margin, coming just behind the 1997 Democratic primary which was decided by a single vote. The front-runner was Siobhan "Sam" Bennett, former CEO of both the Women's Campaign Fund and She Should Run PAC, as well as being the former first vice chair of the Lehigh County Democratic Party. Despite outspending her opponents by almost 3 times, she was upset by former state senator Roy Afflerbach by just 43 individual votes. After a recount Afflerbach's lead increased to 46 votes and his victory was confirmed as he went on to the general election. There was also another Democratic candidate, used furniture salesmen and perennial candidate, David A. Clark who acted as a spoiler for Bennett.

=== Republican primary ===
The Republican primary had two front runners, Bob Lovett, former executive vice president of Air Products and Pamela D. Varkony, a city councilwomen who ran a tough on crime platform and promised to increase tech jobs in Allentown. Additionally, Robert Daday, a community organizer and activist and Robert E. Smith Jr, a former interim city councilor for 13 months in 1998 and 1999, also ran for the nomination. Lovett would go on to win the primary with 40.38% of the vote and a comfortable margin.

=== General election ===
In the general election Lovett spent $283,000 on his campaign with $121,500 coming out of his own pocket compared to Afflerbach's $80,000. Additionally Lovett was mostly financed by PACs while Afflerbach raised most of his money through donations from locals in Allentown. Despite this Afflerbach would go on to win the general election with 52.69% compared to Lovett's 47.31%. Two main reasons where given for Lovett's defeat, the first being that his policies where too similar to incumbent mayor Bill Heydt, and secondly a last minute endorsement of Afflerbach by The Morning Call, Allentown and the Lehigh Valley's most popular newspaper.

== Results ==
Mayor of Allentown, Democratic primary, May 15, 2001.
Party	Candidate	Votes	%
Democratic	Roy Afflerbach	3,361	47.30%
Democratic	Siobhan Sam Bennett	3,315	46.66%
Democratic	David A. Clark	429	6.04%
Total votes		7,105	100.00%

Mayor of Allentown, Republican primary, May 15, 2001.
Party	Candidate	Votes	%
Republican	Bob Lovett	1,948	40.38%
Republican	Pamela D. Varkony	1,632	33.83%
Republican	Bob Daday	925	19.17%
Republican	Robert E. Smith Jr	319	6.62%
Total votes		4,824	100.00%

Mayor of Allentown, November 6, 2001.
Party	Candidate	Votes	%
Democratic	Roy Afflerbach	8,947	52.69%
Republican	Bob Lovett	8,034	47.31%
Total votes		16,981	100.00%
Democratic gain from Republican			

== See also ==
- 2001 United States elections
- Mayors of Allentown, Pennsylvania
