= 2005 Allentown mayoral election =

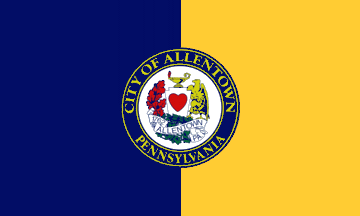
- November 8, 2005
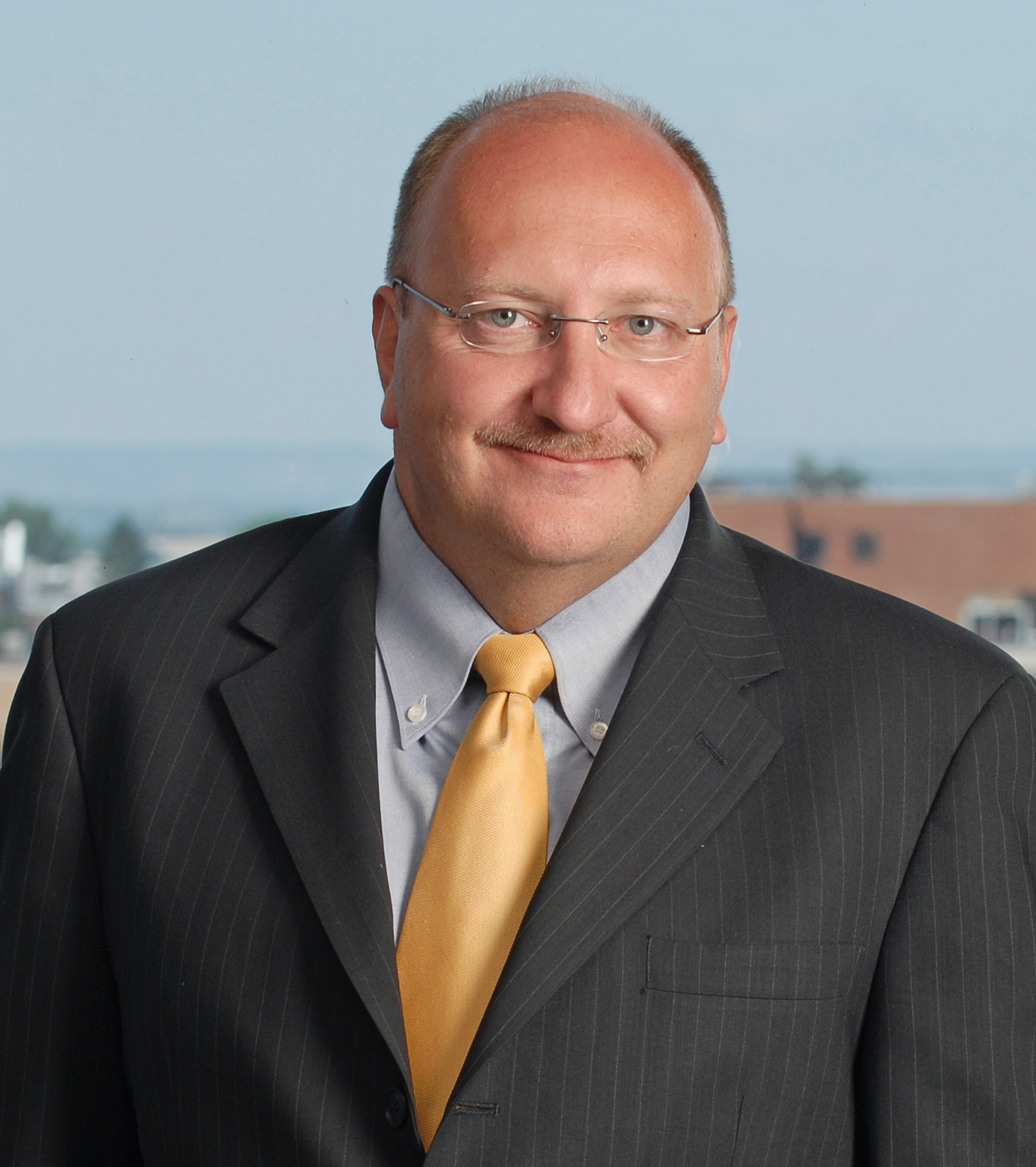

Candidate	Ed Pawlowski	William L Heydt
Party	Democratic	Republican
Popular vote	10,145	6,539
Percentage	58.67%	37.82%
Mayor before election
Roy Afflerbach
Democratic
Elected mayor
Ed Pawlowski
Democratic

The 2005 mayoral election in Allentown, Pennsylvania was held on November 8, 2005, and resulted in the Democrat Ed Pawlowski, being elected to his first of four terms over Republican challenger and former mayor, William L Heydt.

== Background ==
In the previous election, Democrat Roy Afflerbach was elected mayor, however, during his tenure he had difficulty working with the city council. Often being engaged in inflammatory remarks and being blamed by the council for all the city's woes, including the falling through of a possible minor league baseball team, the Ottawa Lynx, relocating to Allentown. Due to the hostility directed towards him, and the stress of having to run the city, Afflerbach chose to note seek re-election opening the door to a fresh slate of Democratic candidates.

== Campaign ==
Both the Republican and Democratic primaries were contested during the election. The Democratic Party nominated Siobhan Bennett, as well as Louis Belletieri, The Republican party nominated William L Heydt as well as David K Bausch, with the main point of contention between the two being either candidates personality and ability to win the general election with Bausch presenting himself as cool and level headed while Heydt was fiery and quick to anger. Heydt would go on to secure the nomination for the Republicans, while Bennett suffered a major upset at the hands of Pawlowski who secured the Democratic nomination.

The campaigning for the general election was particularly charged in 2005. Heydt positioned himself as a moderate fiscal conservative and charged Pawlowski with mismanaging city funds during the Afflerbach administration pointing out the evaporation of the $7,900,000 budget surplus he left behind in 2001 and further decried the lowering of the city's bond rating to BBB+. Pawlowski on the other hand ran a campaign based on optimism for what he can do to improve the city should he take office. Discussing how he can restore pride in the city and end the city's decay, although he offered little specifics. Another contentious issue would be Heydt's refusal to recognize Martin Luther King Jr. Day during his time as mayor, and Pawlowski vowed Affirmative action in the hiring of his cabinet if he were elected to better reflect the city's growing diversity. Additionally, local landlord Michael Molovinsky would run an independent campaign, but was excluded from the main televised debate sponsored by the Morning Call and Muhlenberg College. He did attend several candidate nights. At the NAACP evening, he was asked to "prove" that he wasn't a racist, because he proposed eliminating funding for housing assistance.

Pawlowski's campaign of optimism and restoration of the city's former glory resonated more with the voters of Allentown allowing him to defeat Heydt in a margin of 58.67%-37.82%, with Molovinsky receiving 3.49%. To date the Republicans have not been able to again reach Heydt's 6,539 votes, with the most competitive election since coming in 2017 when Pawlowski ran despite having a 54-count Indictment against him for multiple counts of conspiracy, bribery, attempted extortion, false statements to federal officials, mail fraud, and wire fraud. Even then the Republicans were only able to get 4,440 votes or 36.74% of the electorate (compared to Pawlowski's 4,758 votes or 39.37% of the electorate).

== Results ==
Mayor of Allentown, Democratic primary, May 17, 2005.
Party	Candidate	Votes	%
Democratic	Ed Pawlowski	2,692	40.36%
Democratic	Siobhan Sam Bennett	2,154	32.29%
Democratic	Louie Belletieri	1,824	27.35%
Total votes		6,670	100.00%

Mayor of Allentown, Republican primary, May 17, 2005.
Party	Candidate	Votes	%
Republican	William L Heydt	2,645	67.29
Republican	David K Bausch	1,125	28.62
Republican	Nathan L Woodring	156	3.97
Republican	Write-ins	5	0.12
Total votes		3,931	100.00%

Mayor of Allentown, November 8, 2005.
Party	Candidate	Votes	%
Democratic	Ed Pawlowski	10,145	58.67%
Republican	William L Heydt	6,539	37.82%
Independent	Michael Molovinsky	603	3.49%
Write-In	N/A	5	0.02%
Total votes		17,292	100.00%

== See also ==
- 2005 United States elections
- Mayors of Allentown, Pennsylvania
