= Ed Pawlowski =

American politician

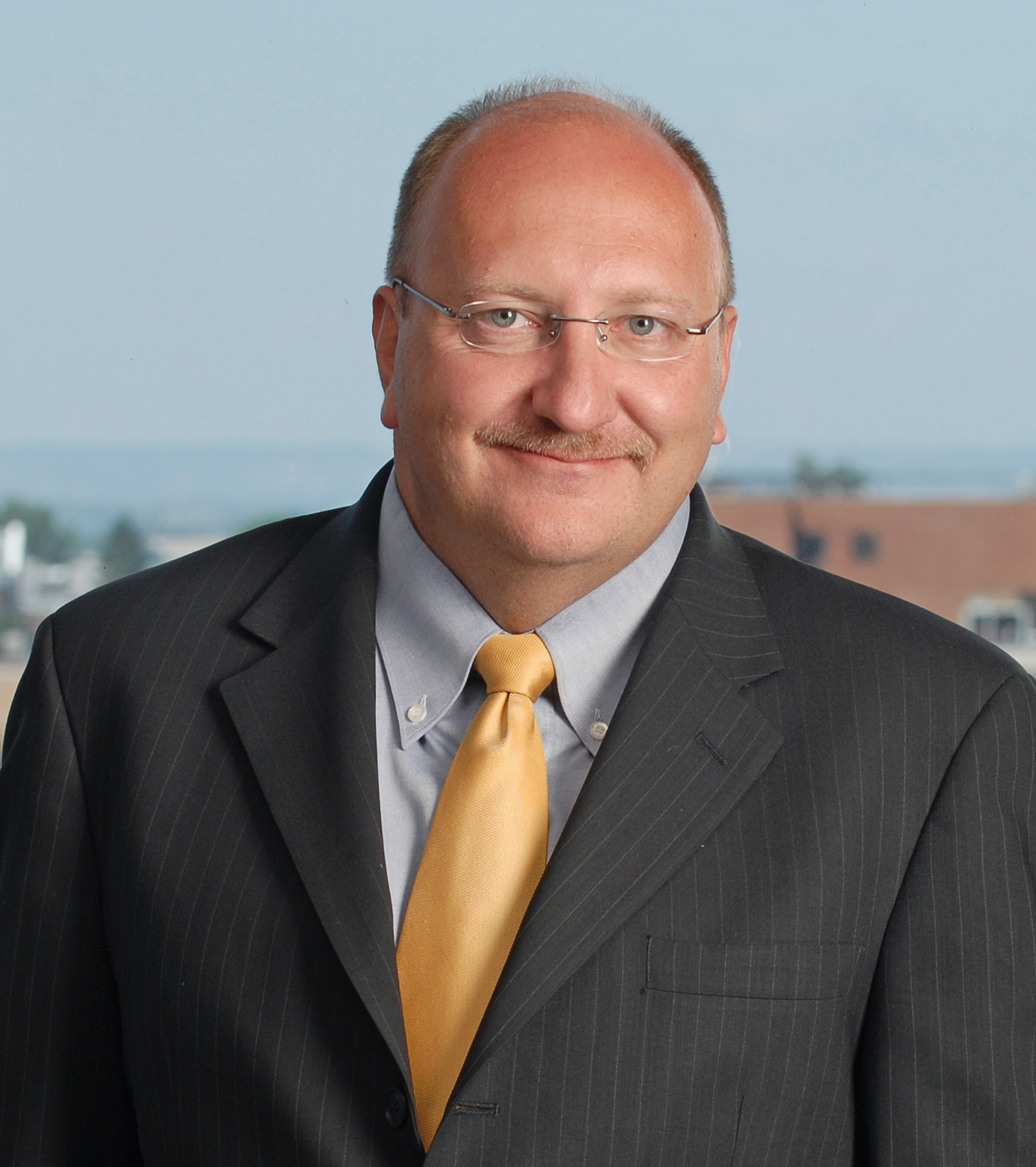
- Pawlowski in August 2007

41st Mayor of Allentown
- In office January 3, 2006 – March 9, 2018
- Preceded by: Roy Afflerbach
- Succeeded by: Roger MacLean (acting)

Personal details
- Born: Edwin Everett Pawlowski Chicago, Illinois, U.S.
- Party: Democratic
- Spouse: Lisa Pawlowski
- Children: 2
- Education: Moody Bible Institute; University of Illinois at Chicago

Edwin Everett Pawlowski is an American politician who served as the 41st Mayor of Allentown, Pennsylvania. He held the office from 2006 until his resignation in 2018, following his election to a fourth term in 2017. He resigned after being convicted on 47 federal charges related to corruption as mayor of Allentown.

On April 17, 2015, Pawlowski announced that he would run for the U.S. Senate in 2016, but he suspended his campaign the following July. He was a candidate for Pennsylvania governor in 2014, but dropped out of the race in February after, he said, "it became clear that he was not going to be able to raise the necessary money."

== Early life and education ==
Pawlowski was born to small business owners in Chicago. The family owned and operated a popular Polish restaurant on the city's North Side. Pawlowski attended school in Chicago and Addison, Illinois, where he earned his high school diploma in 1983. Following his high school graduation, he enrolled at Moody Bible Institute, in Chicago, where he received his bachelor's degree. He went on to earn a master's degree in urban planning and public policy from the University of Illinois at Chicago.

After Moody Bible Institute, Pawlowski worked as a community organizer in Chicago's Southwest Side, focusing on helping residents find quality, affordable housing and improving their quality of life. He then enrolled at the University of Illinois at Chicago, where he pursued his master's degree in urban planning and public policy.

== Career ==
After the University of Illinois at Chicago, Pawlowski was hired as executive director of Windows of Opportunity, the non-profit subsidiary of the Chicago Housing Authority, where he supervised the development of special programs and self-sufficiency projects designed to help Chicago's public housing residents, which at the time numbered more than 100,000.

In 1996, he became executive director of Lehigh Housing Development Corporation, a regional community development corporation later known as Alliance for Building Communities. He was eventually appointed to the post of Director of Community and Economic Development for the City of Allentown by then mayor Roy Afflerbach.

Pawlowski was elected to his first term as mayor of Allentown, Pennsylvania in 2005 by popular vote. Pawlowski was the first candidate for mayor to win every precinct in a competitive election, a distinction he maintained through his 2009 re-election bid.

In the May 21, 2013 primary election, Pawlowski, running for a third consecutive term as mayor on the Democratic ticket, not only won the Democratic nomination but also the Republican nomination through a grassroots write-in campaign initiated by a number of local Republican activists and businessmen. Pawlowski is the first mayor in the history of the City of Allentown to earn both the Republican and Democratic nominations for mayor and as such Pawlowski ran on a cross-filed ticket in the general election.

=== U.S. Senate candidacy ===
On April 17, 2015, Pawlowski announced his intentions to run for the U.S. Senate as the Democratic candidate, running for the seat held by incumbent Senator Pat Toomey.

Pawlowski went on a brief announcement tour and picked up numerous endorsements along the way. The Metropolitan Regional Council of Carpenters and the International Union of Operating Engineers, Local 542, both in Philadelphia, announced their support of Pawlowski, as did the Lehigh Valley Building Trades Council. Pawlowski was also endorsed by fellow mayors Bob Donchez of Bethlehem, Sal Panto of Easton, and Vaughn Spencer of Reading. Pennsylvania State Representatives Michael Schlossberg, Peter Schweyer, Dan McNeill, and Thomas Caltagirone; and Adrian Shanker, chairman of the LGBT Caucus of the Pennsylvania Democratic Party endorsed his candidacy.

Pawlowski suspended his campaign four days after the Federal Bureau of Investigation conducted a search in Allentown City Hall and questioned officials in connection with a grand jury investigation.

=== Controversies ===
==== Lease concession ====
Pawlowski and the majority of Allentown City Council advocated throughout 2012 and 2013 for the lease of the city's publicly owned water and sewer systems to cover soaring pension costs for high-ranking police officers negotiated under the previous administration. The proposal to lease the city's water and sewer systems for 50 years came under significant public scrutiny, especially considering successful legal action by surrounding municipalities that left the city with considerable budget shortfalls involving Allentown's Neighborhood Improvement Zone. Several meetings were held with the public in relation to the lease of water systems, the first being in July 2012. The final vote on whether the water lease would be approved and who would be permitted to purchase it relied on Allentown City Council.

Residents expressed concerns over the safety of water systems in private hands, evidence from prior sales in other cities that suggested rates would skyrocket if the systems were handed over to a private or public firm, the importance of water staying a public asset, and several ethical concerns regarding the transparency of the process. Several residents also argued why the systems needed to be leased, considering that, if the lease succeeded, profits from the water and sewer systems would go into private coffers instead of public funds. Additionally, the Mayor's administration spent an undisclosed amount of public funds on hiring Public Finance Management (PFM) to research the situation and sell the public on the idea of leasing water and sewer systems. The amount spent to hire PFM was later discovered to have totaled $500,000. A conflict of interest was also purported when it was announced that PFM would negotiate the request for proposals for the water lease, thereby giving the firm a stake in the success of the water lease proposal.

As a result of the controversy, a concerned citizens group later referred to as Save Allentown's Water was formed. Also, groups including but not limited to Food and Water Watch, Water Posse, and the Lehigh Valley Industrial Workers of the World all helped to oppose water privatization in the beginning. In October 2012, resident Elijah LoPinto submitted a petition to force Allentown City Council to discuss making the water lease a ballot question, but the council refused to discuss the petition or ballot question. Save Allentown's Water and Food and Water Watch compiled a petition to make the water lease a referendum. The petitioners gathered over 4,000 signatures from registered voters in Allentown, double the required 2,000. Despite the signatures being deemed valid, the petition was disqualified in February 2013 for not meeting requirements under the Pennsylvania Election Code and State Constitution.

In April 2013, more public meetings were held as Allentown City Council prepared to commence with a final vote on the water lease. Pawlowski continued to defend his proposal despite the concerns of the public, stating that, "in less than 24 months Allentown would be just another Pennsylvania city making very ugly headlines about bankruptcy and its leaders lacking the political courage to address its fiscal problems."

Over 100 residents were in attendance at the final meeting on the water lease, where the lease was approved by city council by a 6-1 vote. The highest bidder for the water lease was Lehigh County Authority (LCA) with a bid of $220 million.

The LCA is a public water and wastewater utility governed by a nine-member board of directors appointed by the county, whose ratemaking practices are governed by the Pennsylvania Municipal Authorities Act.

The lease-concession provided the city an upfront payment of $211 million, with annual payments of $500,000. The payments helped the city reduce its unfunded pension liability by $150 million, eliminate $30 million in water and sewer debt and reduce its annual Municipal pension obligation from $28 million to $6 million in a single year.

As a result, S&P Global Ratings elevated Allentown’s bond rating by three notches from BBB+ to A+. The rating agency noted that the dramatic one time rate increase was due to city’s "significantly improved budget flexibility" as a result of its water and sewer system lease-concession agreement.

The lease concession and bonds sold to finance development in the Neighborhood Improvement Zone collectively won Allentown recognition from The Bond Buyer as its "Deal of the Year", for the Northeast Region in 2013.

==== FBI probe and conviction ====
In 2013, the Federal Bureau of Investigation began "interception of electronic and wire communications" in Allentown City Hall. On July 2, 2015, the FBI raided Allentown City Hall and Pawlowski's home as part of a more-than-two-year investigation into Allentown's contracting practices. Several days later, Mike Fleck, campaign manager for Pawlowski and former Reading mayor Vaughn Spencer, abruptly moved from his Allentown home. News reports at the time claimed that Fleck was secretly recording Pawlowski and Spencer for the FBI. Subsequently, two individuals pleaded guilty on bribery charges related to the investigation. Court documents related to one of the cases implicated an unnamed individual ("Public Official No. 3") who matched the description of Pawlowski. The defendant in the other case was Reading City Council President Francisco Acosta, and documents in that case implicated unnamed individual ("Public Official No. 1") matching the description of Reading's Mayor Spencer. Acosta received a two-year prison sentence.

In November 2015, former Allentown assistant solicitor Dale Wiles pleaded guilty in federal court to conspiracy to commit mail and wire fraud. Charging documents stated that Wiles was working under the direction of Public Official No. 3 when he steered a contract, initially scored in favor of another vendor, to a donor of the official. Eron Lloyd, a special assistant to Spencer, pleaded guilty to conspiracy to commit bribery offenses. Charging documents stated that he conspired with Public Official No. 1. to bribe Reading City Council members to repeal campaign contribution limits for recipients of no-bid contracts.

In January 2016, former Allentown finance director Gary Strathearn pleaded guilty to conspiracy to commit mail and wire fraud. Charging documents stated Strathearn steered a contract to campaign donors of Public Official No. 3. That same month, Allentown Controller Mary Ellen Koval resigned and pleaded guilty to conspiracy to commit honest services fraud. Charging documents stated that Koval conspired with Public Official No. 3 to steer contracts with the city and with the Allentown Parking Authority to campaign donors. On January 20, 2016 the Allentown City Council unanimously voted no confidence in the mayor and called on him to resign.

Additional guilty pleas relating to the FBI investigation were made in April 2016. Pawlowski's campaign manager Mike Fleck pleaded guilty to one count of conspiracy to commit extortion and bribery offenses and a single count of tax evasion. According to court documents, Fleck worked with several unnamed public officials in Reading and Allentown to deprive citizens of their "right to honest services" through "bribery and kickbacks." Matthew McTish, president of McTish, Kunkel & Associates, an Allentown-based engineering firm, pleaded guilty to one count of conspiracy to commit bribery offenses. According to court documents, McTish donated to the campaigns of Public Officials No. 1 and No. 3 to secure municipal contracts in Allentown and Reading.

In March 2017, Francis Dougherty, the former managing director for Allentown, pleaded guilty to one count of conspiracy to commit mail and wire fraud in an alleged effort to steer city contracts and other services to Pawlowski campaign donors. According to court documents, Dougherty conspired with Public Official No. 3 to steer the city's streetlight upgrade contract to a campaign donor of Public Official No. 3. He also threatened to fire a city employee who did not write bidding documents in a way favorable to a campaign donor, court documents say. Patrick Regan, a former vice president with The Efficiency Network (TEN), pleaded guilty to conspiracy to commit mail and wire fraud on June 12, 2017 in regards to the streetlight contract. According to court documents, Regan participated in a conspiracy with Dougherty to give Regan's company an advantage in the bidding process. Court documents state that Dougherty allowed Regan to rewrite the city's bidding documents for the contract and pass them through an intermediary, giving Dougherty a "degree of separation." Regan was told the process was designed to "eliminate competition," court documents state. Regan was also a donor to Pawlowski's mayoral, gubernatorial, and U.S. Senate campaigns, according to campaign finance records. The TEN contract was canceled in the wake of the investigation.

On April 3, 2017, Mark Neisser, former business development manager of T&M Associates, pleaded guilty to conspiracy to commit bribery offenses. The charging documents indicate that Neisser admitted giving thousands of dollars in campaign contributions to Public Official No. 1 and to Public Official No. 3 to "gain or maintain his firm's competitive edge" to receive municipal engineering contracts in Reading and in Allentown.

On July 25, 2017, Pawlowski was indicted in a pay-to-play scheme, according to his lawyer. Pawlowski denied any wrongdoing and said he would not step down or drop out of his campaign for a fourth term as Allentown mayor. On March 1, 2018, following a federal trial, Pawlowski was found guilty of 47 charges, including multiple counts of conspiracy, bribery, attempted extortion, false statements to federal officials, mail fraud, and wire fraud. He was found not guilty of seven charges. After the conviction, U.S. Attorney Louis D. Lappen said, Pawlowski "(sold) his office to the highest bidder to fund his personal ambitions". On March 7, 2018, Pawlowski announced his resignation as Mayor of Allentown. On October 23, 2018, Pawlowski was sentenced to 15 years in federal prison. On June 25, 2026, Pawlowski was released from federal prison to a halfway house in Philadelphia.

In March 2022, the United States Court of Appeals for the Third Circuit upheld Pawlowski's convictions. In 2023, a third of the way through his sentence, Pawlowski maintained his innocence and his supporters, including a member of the Allentown City Council, stated that his 15 year sentence did not fit the typical sentencing for his crimes, and instead argued that he should have received a three to five-year prison year term. Pawlowski's supporters have written letters to President Joe Biden requesting a presidential pardon for Pawlowski.

== Personal life ==
Pawlowski has been married for 25 years to Lisa (Halsey), a community activist and licensed social worker in Allentown, who he met as a student at Moody Bible Institute. They have two children.

== See also ==
- List of mayors of Allentown, Pennsylvania
