= 1969 Allentown mayoral election =

1969 mayoral election in Allentown, Pennsylvania, United States

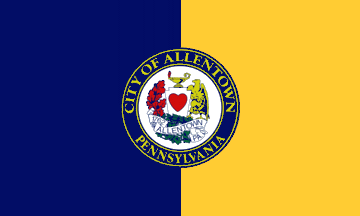
- November 4, 1969
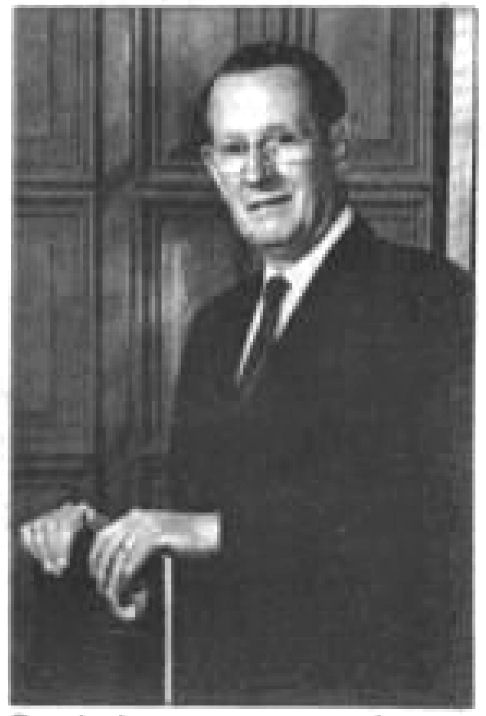

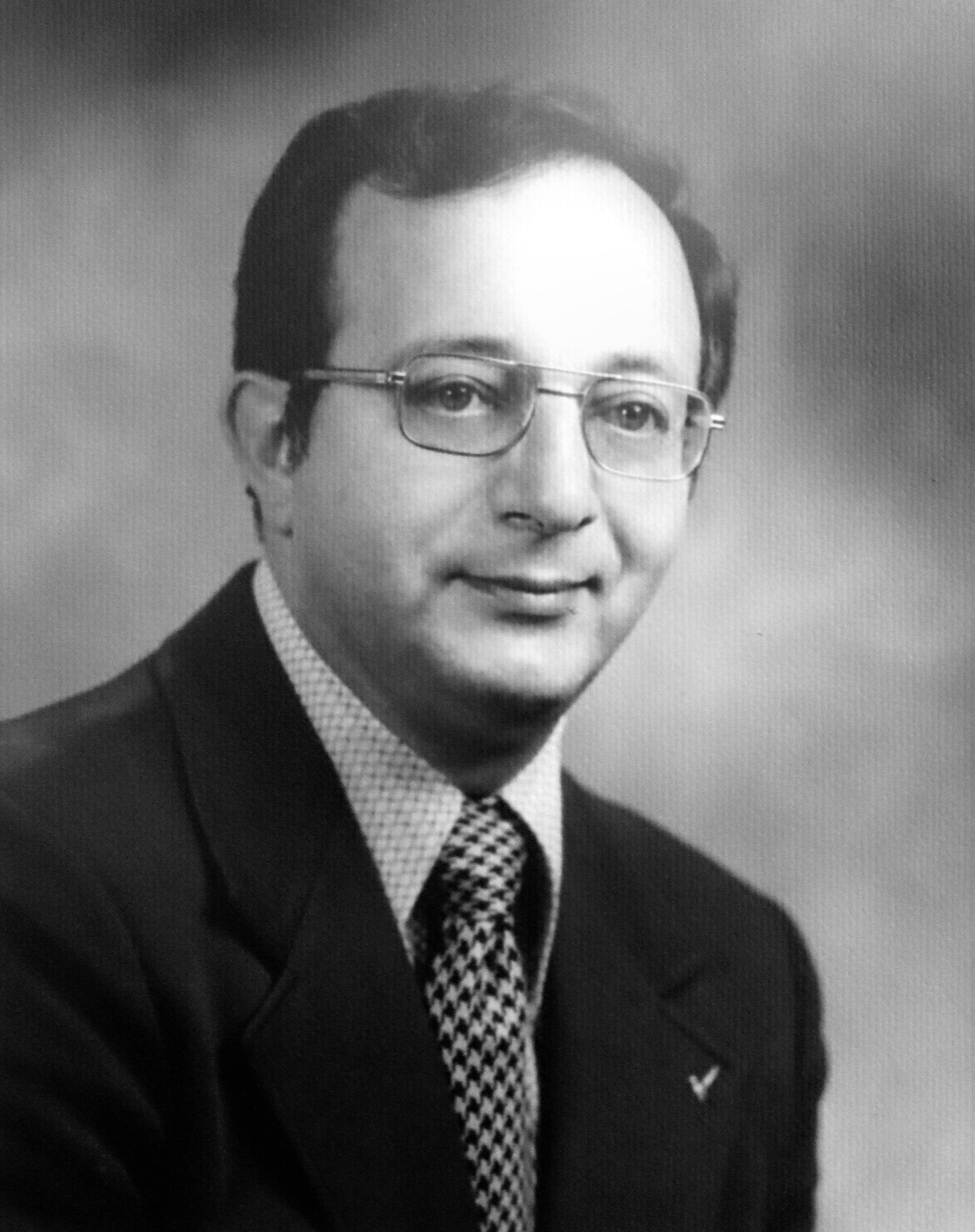
Candidate	Clifford S. Bartholomew	Joseph S. Daddona
Party	Republican	Democratic
Popular vote	19,275	14,388
Percentage	57.26%	42.74%
Mayor before election
Raymond D. Bracy
Democratic
Elected mayor
Clifford S. Bartholomew
Republican

The 1969 Allentown mayoral election was a municipal election in Allentown, the third largest city in Pennsylvania. Republican educator Clifford S. Bartholomew defeated Democrat Joseph S. Daddona, then a first-term city councilmen, who had beaten incumbent mayor Raymond D. Bracy in the primaries.

== Background ==
Democratic mayor Raymond "Ray" D. Bracy had been elected in 1966 and faced growing discontent over his urban renewal projects that 'cleared' blighted housing by demolishing large, mostly minority, communities. He refused to meet with local NAACP leaders over urban renewal concerns, which greatly hurt his reputation within the Allentown Democratic Party.

== Campaign ==
=== Democratic primary ===
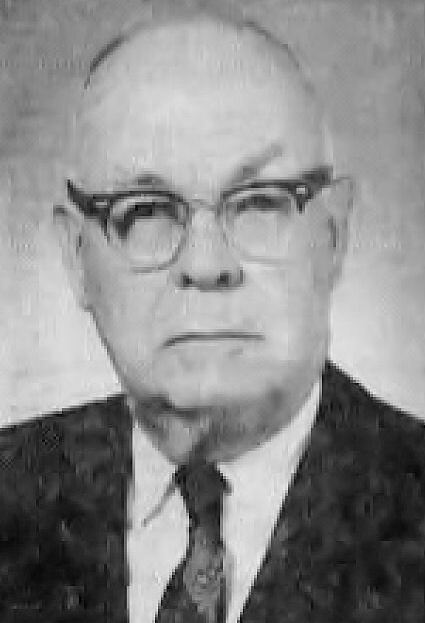
Incumbent mayor Ray D. Bracy would lose the Democratic primary

Bracy was subject to a concerted challenge from the Allentown Democratic Party which saw Daddona, a young fresh face who promised responsive leadership and change to the way the city was run, seeking the nomination. Bracy's age was one of the main issues. Daddona would handily defeat Bracy.

=== Republican primary ===
There were no serious Republican primary as the party coalesced around Clifford S. "Chips" Bartholomew, a longtime educator who served as the principle of William Allen High School from the 1940s until just before the election.

=== General election ===
Bartholomew's campaign emphasized integrity and effective administration. The race quickly became similar to the democratic primary, with the main issue being the generational divide between Bartholomew and Daddona, with Daddona having been a student at William Allen when Bartholomew was principle. Campaign issues also included urban redevelopment, government responsiveness, and the city's future direction, with Daddona campaigning as the "voice of the working people" while Bartholomew stressed the need for stability and experience. Both candidates pledged to revitalize Allentown’s economy and address concerns about public safety and services. Daddona was so sure that he would win the election that he voted for Bartholomew.

Mayor of Allentown, general election, November 4, 1969.
Party	Candidate	Votes	%
Republican	Clifford S. Bartholomew	19,275	57.26%
Democratic	Joseph S. Daddona	14,388	42.74%
Total votes		33,663	100.00%
Republican gain from Democratic			

== Legacy ==
The Republican victory ended 14 years of Democratic control of city hall. At the same time as the election, Allentown adopted a new Home Rule Charter, with voters approving transitioning to a "strong mayor" form of government with Bartholomew being the first strong mayor.

Following his defeat, Bracy retired from politics. Bartholomew was defeated by a primary challenge in 1973, witg the Democrats re-nominating Daddona, who went on to win.

Although Daddona lost his re-election bid in 1977, he was re-elected in 1981, 1985 and 1989 being a major force in Allentown politics through the 1970s, 80s and early 90s. During the 1977 election, a local contractor and Democratic donor, Dominic Falcone, claimed that he had illegally contributed $1,500 to Daddona's 1969 campaign, in excess of legal limits which caused Daddona to lose the narrow election. Falcone also put up a $10,000 bounty on any politician that would run against Daddona in the 1981 primaries.
