= 1973 Allentown mayoral election =

1973 Pennsylvania local election

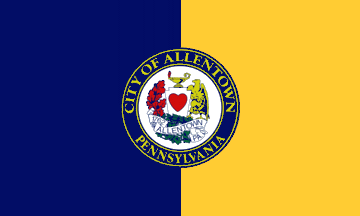
- November 6, 1977
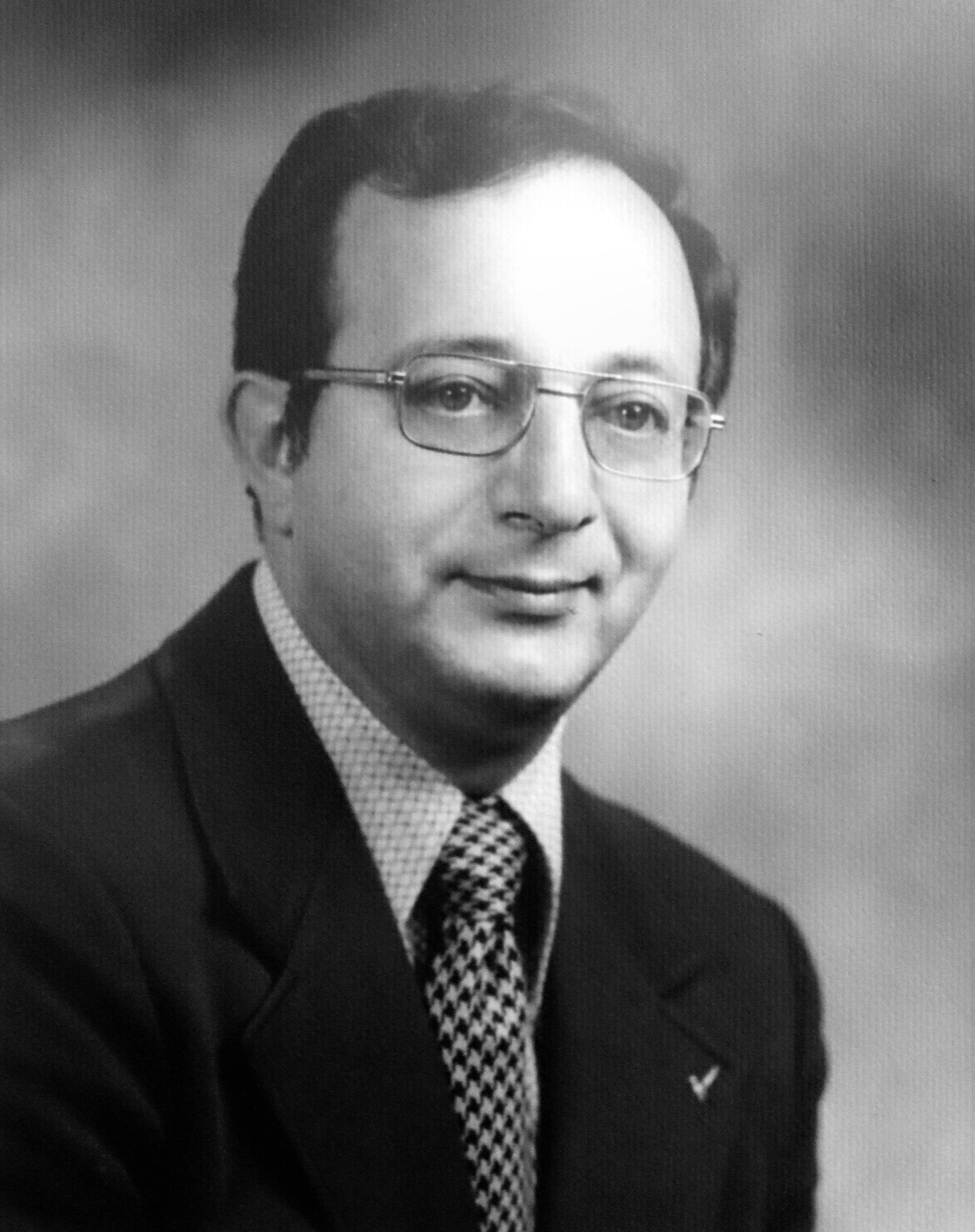

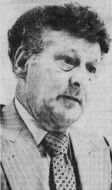
Candidate	Joseph S. Daddona	Leroy S. Bogert
Party	Democratic	Republican
Popular vote	17,468	9,207
Percentage	65.5%	34.5%
Mayor before election
Clifford S. Bartholomew
Republican
Elected mayor
Joseph S. Daddona
Democratic

The 1973 Allentown mayoral election was a municipal election in Allentown, Pennsylvania, United States. Incumbent Republican mayor Clifford S. Bartholomew was defeated in the Republican primaries by Leroy S. Bogert, who lost the mayoral election to two-term Democratic city councilman Joseph S. Daddona.

== Background ==
In 1970 the city of Allentown voted to replace their 56-year-old municipal charter with a strong mayor government. Prior to this, the city operated under a commission system, where voters would elect the mayor, who would then appoint four city councillors to run departments where the strong mayor's executive would be totally separate from the city council.

In this election Clifford S. Bartholomew, a long time educator and school administrator from 1927 to 1969, was elected the city's first Strong Mayor, in what was seen as a major upset. Republican Bartholomew, who had no political experience, defeated Democrat city-councilman Joseph Daddona. The Republicans also swept the election for the four seats in the city council being contested that year. Daddona has been so sure he was going to win that he cast his vote for Bartholomew.

== Campaigns ==
=== Republican primary ===
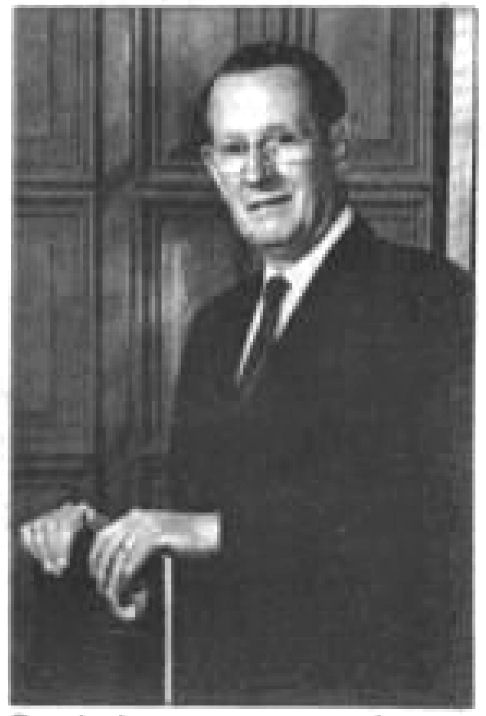
Incumbent Republican Mayor Clifford S. Bartholomew (pictured) was defeated by primary challenger Leroy S. Bogert

Mayor Bartholomew was given the task of reorganizing the municipal government from the ground up to accommodate the new city charter. To this end he created a 911 line, a K-9 Corps, a citywide newspaper recycling program, the Allentown Drug Commission and the Allentown Council of Youth. However, to finance these expansions, the city's budget ballooned, with Bartholomew needing to levy more taxes, which was deeply unpopular with the fiscal-conservative establishment of the Allentown Republican Party.

Bartholomew faced a primary challenge from local perennial candidate Leroy S. Bogert, who was the president of the "South Side Republican Club" and ran for the Republican nomination eight separate times between 1951 and 1977. Bogert opposed public institutionalized housing, waging a grassroots NIMBY campaign against the Cumberland Gardens Project. Bogert also campaigned against fluoridation, not due to health concerns, but due to the sheer cost, as well as opposing the city administration's high salaries. Bogert also supported a spur route linking routes 22 and 309, and tax relief for senior citizens.

Bogert won the primary by just 216 votes, a major upset credited in part to a late endorsement by the WLVT-TV, the first time they had endorsed any political candidate.

=== Democratic primary ===
There was no serious Democratic primary, as the city's party coalesced around Joseph Daddona, then a two-term city councilmen, and the party's candidate in 1969 when he lost to Bartholomew.

=== General election ===
Many had expected the election to be a rematch of 1969, with Bartholomew facing off against Daddona again. However, Bogert's surprise primary victory dampened the effort by the city's Republican party to campaign as Bartholomew's supporters were not enthusiastic about Bogert.

Mayor of Allentown, general election, November 6, 1973.
Party	Candidate	Votes	%
Democratic	Joseph S. Daddona	17,468	65.5%
Republican	Leroy S. Bogert	9,207	34.5%
Total votes		26,675	100.00%
Democratic gain from Republican			

== Legacy ==
Bogert stood for one more election, being defeated in the 1977 primaries, after-which he continued to work as a general contractor until his death in 1987 at the age of 75. Daddona revitalized his political career with his victory. Although he lost the subsequent election, he went on to be elected mayor three more times in 1981, 1985, and 1989.

Despite the rivalry between Daddona and Bartholomew, Daddona said that Bartholomew was not only his favorite principle, but his favorite mayor, having gone to school under him. During the transition of power Bartholomew left an envelope in the mayoral desk with instructions to Daddona to not open until a political crisis. A few months into his term, when Daddona opened the letter, all it contained was a note reading "blame me." Bartholomew served as the educational director of the Lehigh County Historical Society before his death in 1999 at the age of 94.
