= 1981 Allentown mayoral election =

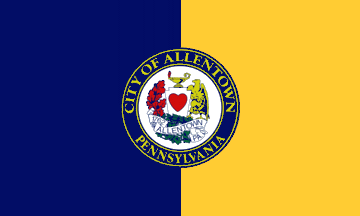
- November 2, 1981
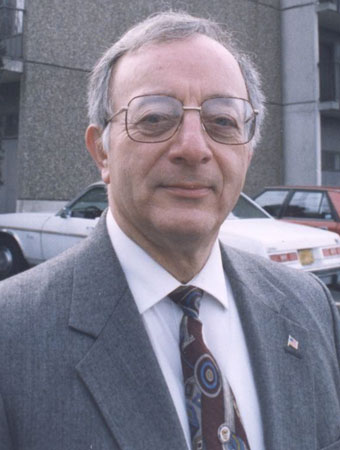

Candidate	Joseph S. Daddona	Robert E. Smith Jr.
Party	Democratic	Republican
Popular vote	15,487	8,362
Percentage	64.94%	35.06%
Mayor before election
Frank Fischl
Republican
Elected mayor
Joseph S. Daddona
Democratic

The 1981 Allentown mayoral election was a municipal election to determine the mayor of Allentown, the third largest city in Pennsylvania. Incumbent first-term Republican mayor Frank Fischl did not seek re-election, with the Republicans instead running local businessman and former city councilmen Robert E. Smith Jr. against the Democratic former mayor Joseph S. Daddona.

== Campaign ==
=== Democratic Primary ===
The race gained media notoriety when local businessmen Dominic Falcone awarded $10,000 in his will for anyone who would run against former Mayor Joseph Daddona. Falcone, who died on May 12, 1981, claimed to have illegally made a $1,500 donation to Daddona's failed 1969 effort for mayor. Although the allegation was disproved after the election, the scandal was one of the deciding factors in Daddona's loss by 121 votes. Falcone meanwhile was arrested in 1977 for soliciting a prostitute.

There where two Democratic front runners during the election, city Controller Louis J. Hershman, and former mayor Joseph S. Daddona.

=== Republicans ===
Incumbent first-term Republican mayor Frank Fischl announced that he would not be seeking re-election to a second term, despite being popular with the city's Republican voters, who attempted to convince him to run. Fischl never gave an official reason for his refusal of re-election, but The Morning Call speculated that it had to do with the difficulty of passing an amendment to the city's property tax to cover the operation cost of the city's ambulances. Fischl was adamantly against increasing the property tax and bitterly feuded with both the Republicans and Democrats on the city council. It was believed that if he ran, the local Republican committee would refuse to endorse him and run another candidate, forcing him to run as a political independent. The Republicans did not have a primary; instead the Lehigh County Republican Committee formed a recruitment committee which interviewed candidates. The party chose Robert E. Smith Jr., a city councilman and local business leader, as their candidate.

Smith worked as the chairman of Robert G. Smith Inc. for over 30 years, and worked as the chairman of the Allentown Sheraton at the time of his nomination. He also owned, operated and managed three restaurants in Allentown prior to working for Sheraton. Smith also ran against Daddona in the 1970s and served on Allentown City Council from 1976 to 1980 where he was treasurer from 1980 until 1983 and vice president of City Council from 1977 to 1979.

=== General election ===
Daddona was the heavy favorite to win the election, and won with 15,487 votes to Smith's 8,362. In the election, 621 votes from the polling place at the Union Terrace School were not properly recorded due to glitches in the electronic voting machines.

== Results ==
Mayor of Allentown, Democratic primary, May 19, 1981.
Party	Candidate	Votes	%
Democratic	Joseph S. Daddona	2,308	60.10%
Democratic	Louis J. Hershman	1,083	39.90%
Total votes		3,391	100.00%

Mayor of Allentown, general election, November 2, 1981.
Party	Candidate	Votes	%
Democratic	Joseph S. Daddona	15,487	64.94%
Republican	Robert E. Smith Jr.	8,362	35.06%
Total votes		23,849	100.00%
Democratic gain from Republican			

== Legacy ==
One of the lingering issues from this campaign was an accusation by two Allentown police officers, Thomas Bennis and Roger MacLean, that Mayor Daddona demoted them due to their opposition to him in 1981. The city, and Daddona, defended the demotions, stating that they were to break up a clique of officers who harassed and intimidated other policemen in order to gain influence on the force. On June 6, 1983, Daddona and the city were found guilty. The defense argued that the prosecution and judge, Daniel Henry Huyett III made over 130 errors in the delivery of the verdict against the city, but the jury found that the city owed the pair $400,000. The issue remained contentious during Daddona's reelection effort in the 1985 Allentown mayoral election.

After his defeat, Smith ran unsuccessfully for the 16th District of the Pennsylvania Senate against Democratic incumbent Roy Afflerbach in 1994. He also served as the chairman, commissioner and treasurer of the Allentown Housing Authority from 1997 to 2002 as well as on the boards of several small state economic boards and offices and served as the manager for six different election campaigns and as a delegate to three Republican National Conventions before his death on December 12, 2002, at the age of 70.

This election resurrected Daddona's career, and he went on to win the 1985 and 1989 elections, serving as mayor for three consecutive, and four overall terms, tying the record for longest serving mayor with Malcolm W. Gross at 12 years. The city's post office was named in his memory after he died on June 5, 2004.

Concurrent to the mayoral election, there was also an election to the Allentown City Council which saw the Democrats beat the sole Republican incumbent, Guy Kratzer. This created a unanimously Democratic council, although two Republicans, Luther Robb and Peter Hance, were temporally appointed to the council for less than a year in 1983 following vacancies. A Republican was not elected to the council again until 1991.
