= Frank Fischl =

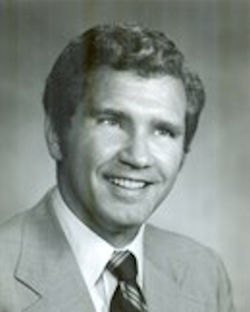
- Fischl in 1975

Mayor of Allentown, Pennsylvania
- In office 1978–1982
- Preceded by: Joe Daddona
- Succeeded by: Joe Daddona

Personal details
- Born: October 25, 1926 Allentown, Pennsylvania, U.S.
- Died: October 12, 2016 (aged 89) Allentown, Pennsylvania, U.S.
- Party: Republican
- Spouse: Anne Fischl
- Children: Three
- Education: United States Military Academy

Frank R. Fischl Jr. (October 25, 1926 – October 12, 2016) was an American U.S. Air Force colonel and politician. In 1966, Fischl, an Air Force pilot with the 433rd Tactical Fighter Squadron during the Vietnam War, was awarded the Silver Star, the U.S. military's third-highest decoration for valor in combat, "for gallantry in connection with military operations" for his role in an airstrike conducted in North Vietnam on September 3, 1966. Fischl later served as the Mayor of Allentown, Pennsylvania, from 1978 until 1982.

== Early life and education ==
Fischl was born and raised in Allentown, Pennsylvania, to Frank R. Fischl, Sr. and Helen (née Gehringer) Fischl. He graduated from Allentown High School, which was later renamed William Allen High School in 1945.

In 1947, Fischl entered the United States Military Academy in West Point, New York. He played as a starting halfback on the Army Black Knights football team, where he was briefly coached by Vince Lombardi. He graduated from the U.S. Military Academy in 1951 and entered the United States Air Force.

Fischl would later graduate from the Industrial College of the Armed Forces, later renamed the Dwight D. Eisenhower School for National Security and Resource Strategy, and earned an MBA from Syracuse University.

== Career ==
=== U.S. Air Force ===
Fischl, an Air Force pilot, flew combat missions in both the Korean War and the Vietnam War. On September 3, 1966, then-Major Fischl, a member of the 433rd Tactical Fighter Squadron based in Thailand, took part in an airstrike in North Vietnam.

He was awarded the Silver Star on October 18, 1966, "for gallantry in connection with military operations" for his role in the September 3rd mission. According to the Silver Star citation, "On that date, Major Fischl conducted a night strike on a vital supply and storage area of the hostile force in a highly defended area. With complete disregard for his own safety, Major Fischl continued the attack in the face of intense defenses to deliver ordnance on the target, completely destroying the target. By his gallantry and devotion to duty, Major Fischl has reflected great credit upon himself and the United States Air Force."

In addition to his Silver Star, Fischl was also awarded two Distinguished Flying Crosses, eleven Air Medals, two Service stars, and the Legion of Merit.

His final posting was as the Director of Safety for the Air Force's European division. Fischl retired from the U.S. Air Force with the rank of colonel in 1974.

=== Political career ===
In 1977, Fischl, a Republican, announced his candidacy for Mayor of his native Allentown, Pennsylvania, after friends encouraged him to run for the office. He narrowly defeated incumbent mayor Joe Daddona, a Democrat, by just 121 votes in the 1977 mayoral general election.

As mayor, Fischl introduced a series of tax breaks for businesses and established tax abatement zones, which were intended to encourage property development. Projects which were developed as a result of Fischl's tax breaks included present-day Wells Fargo, formerly Wachovia, and Crown Plaza Hotel in Center City Allentown.

Fischl underwent quadruple bypass surgery while in office, which many believed contributed to his decision not to seek a second term in the 1981 election. However, it is also noted that Fischl was in a feud with both the city's Democrats and Republicans over his opposition to raising the city's property tax to cover the cost of ambulances, with the Republican committee unlikely to endorse him and instead run another candidate, which would have forced Fischl to run as an Independent. He was succeeded by former Mayor Joe Daddona, who regained the office.

In 1984, Pennsylvania governor Dick Thornburgh appointed Fischl to the Pennsylvania Public Utility Commission, where he served as a member from 1984 until 1991.

== Death ==
Fischl died in Allentown on October 12, 2016, at the age of 89. He was survived by his wife of 41 years, Anne L. (Eckert) Fischl, their two daughters, and a stepdaughter. He was interred in Grandview Cemetery in South Whitehall Township, Pennsylvania.
