= 1989 Allentown mayoral election =

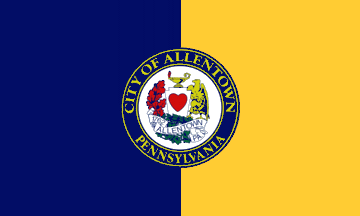
- November 7, 1989
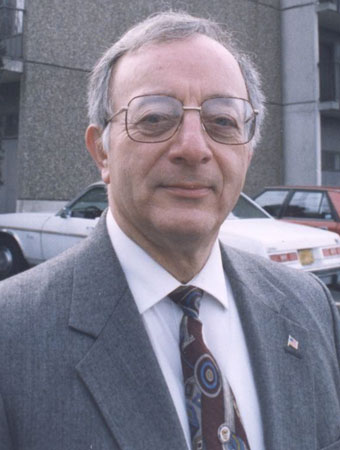

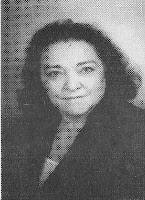
Candidate	Joseph S. Daddona	Emma Tropiano
Party	Democratic	Citizens For Emma
Alliance	Republican
Percentage	60%	40%
Mayor before election
Joseph S. Daddona
Democratic
Elected mayor
Joseph S. Daddona
Democratic

The 1989 Allentown mayoral election was a municipal election to determine the mayor of Allentown, Pennsylvania. Two-term Democratic mayor Joseph S. Daddona sought re-election to a third term, receiving both the Democratic and Republican nominations, but was challenged by an Independent campaign from a Democratic councilwoman Emma Tropiano.

== Campaign ==
Tropiano, a veteran Democratic councilwoman, challenged Daddona in the Democratic primary for the 1985 Allentown mayoral election and lost. In 1989 she registered for the election as an Independent, officially for the "Citizens For Emma" party, allowing Daddona to win the Democratic nomination unopposed. Daddona also secured the Republican nomination after the party didn't stand any candidates, and his supporters launched a successful write-in campaign.

=== General election ===
Tropiano kept her campaign laid back until 45-days before the election, when she levied a flurry of accusations and complaints with the Daddona mayoralty. Tropiano centered her campaign on a tough-on-crime platform, notably arguing that the city's growing Hispanic population, now accounting for 12% of the city's population, was the cause of at least 34% of the city's crime. This touched a nerve with the city's Hispanic population which had largely moved to Allentown from New York City to escape high crime rates. She also accused Daddona of doing nothing to stop prostitution, drug dealing, and gang activity within the city, and proposed drastically increasing the city's police department. Tropiano also based her campaign out of a camp outside the Kline's Island sewage treatment plant, highlighting a broken campaign promise Daddona made that he would sleep at the plant a day every week until its odor problem is fixed. Daddona retorted to the attacks by pointing out Tropiano's lack of public speaking skills, with all her talking points being assembled by "hidden henchmen". Daddona also criticized Tropiano for voting against redevelopment of the downtown 14 times while she was on the city council.

Daddona raised nearly $37,000 since mid-June and spent $21,200 while Tropiano raised $11,200 and spent $8,900. Going into election day, Daddona had a 2:1 lead in the polls. Daddona handily beat Tropiano by a margin of 4,000 votes.

== Results ==
Mayor of Allentown, November 7, 1989.
Party	Candidate	Votes	%
Democratic-Republican	Joseph S. Daddona		60%
Citizens for Emma	Emma Tropiano		40%
Total votes			100.00%
Democratic hold			

== Legacy ==
Daddona is only one of two mayors to have been elected to three consecutive terms, tying the record of Mayor Malcolm W. Gross, although Daddona also had a fourth, non-consecutive term from 1974 to 1978, bringing his total time as mayor to 16 years. Daddona would retire and not seek re-election in 1993.
