= 1977 Allentown mayoral election =

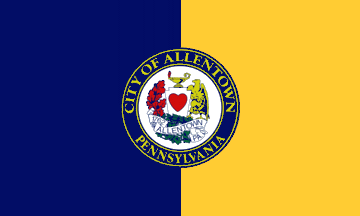
- November 8, 1977
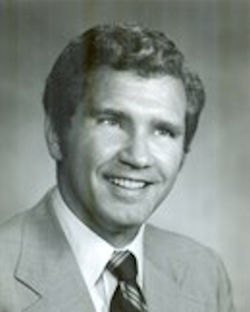

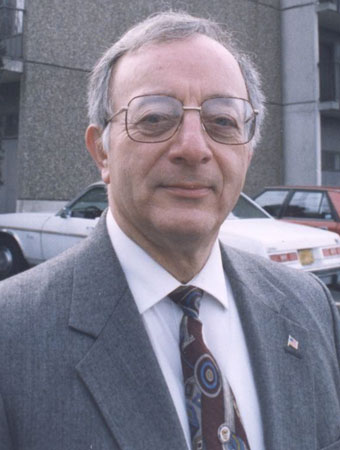
Candidate	Frank Fischl	Joseph S. Daddona
Party	Republican	Democratic
Popular vote	13,429	13,324
Percentage	50.20%	49.80%
Mayor before election
Joseph S. Daddona
Democratic
Elected mayor
Frank Fischl
Republican

The 1977 Allentown mayoral election was a municipal election in Allentown, the third largest city in Pennsylvania. Incumbent Democratic mayor Joseph S. Daddona was unexpectedly defeated by Republican political outsider and air-force Colonel Frank Fischl, who won by a margin of 121 votes.

== Campaign ==
=== Democrats ===
Incumbent mayor Joseph S. Daddona was unopposed in the Democratic primary, instead holding a debate with the Democratic city council candidates hosted by WLVT-TV and sponsored by the Leagues of Women Voters of Allentown, Bethlehem and Easton. The six candidates, Daddona, Cramsey, Kercher, Howells, Martin, and Bogert shared their opinions on local issues, such as garbage and trash collection, housing for the elderly, reducing the crime rate, and promoting efforts to preserve South Mountain.

=== Republicans ===
Frank R. Fischl Jr. graduated from Allentown High School in 1945 and served two years in the U.S. Army before going to West Point where he played Football as the starting halfback under legendary coach Vince Lombardi. He graduated in 1951. Afterwards Fischl served in the U.S. Air force during both the Korean War and Vietnam War, earning over a dozen decorations, including the Silver Star for a sortie on October 18, 1966, before retiring in 1977 at the rank of Colonel. During the primaries, Fischl centered his campaign on drawing more small businesses to city center by slashing taxes and cutting red tape, which in turn would create more businesses that would be taxed, mitigating the loss in income from the tax cuts, and increasing the citizens' quality of life.

=== General election ===
Fischl defeated the incumbent Daddona. Unofficial results stated that Fischl garnered 13,446 votes while Daddona earned 13,307, a margin of 139 votes. Due to the close nature of the race, a recount was held in which Fischl maintained the lead, though his margin of victory narrowed to just 121. During the election, contractor Dominic Falcone claimed to have made a $1,500 donation to Daddona's 1969 campaign, which would have violated contribution limits and resulted in legal trouble for Daddona. Although the claim was disproved after the election, due to the close nature of the race, Daddona considered it to be the deciding factor in his loss.

Mayor of Allentown, general election, November 8, 1977.
Party	Candidate	Votes	%
Republican	Frank Fischl	13,429	50.20%
Democratic	Joseph S. Daddona	13,324	49.80%
Total votes		26,753	100.00%
Republican gain from Democratic			

== Legacy ==
Fischl did not seek re-election to a second term, stepping down as mayor in 1982. He clashed frequently with the city's Republican establishment, basing his tenure on keeping taxes as low as possible. He slashed taxes even more for local small businesses, however, after a heated series of exchanges over increasing property taxes to cover the operating cost of the city's ambulances the city council bypassed Fischl to pass the increase, with Fischl announcing his refusal to a second term shortly after. He went on to be named to the Pennsylvania Public Utility Commission in 1984. In 1991 he was named to the National Football Foundation's Lehigh Valley Chapter's hall of fame. He died on October 12, 2016, at the age of 89.
