= 1985 Allentown mayoral election =

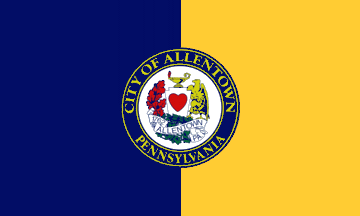
- November 6, 1985
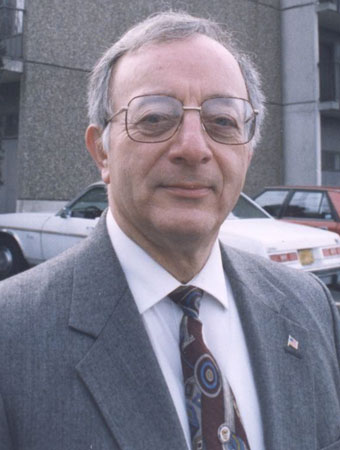

Candidate	Joseph S. Daddona	Charles J. Theisen
Party	Democratic	Republican
Popular vote	13,210	5,778
Percentage	69.57%	30.43%
Mayor before election
Joseph S. Daddona
Democratic
Elected mayor
Joseph S. Daddona
Democratic

The 1985 Allentown mayoral election was a municipal election to determine the mayor of Allentown, the third largest city in Pennsylvania. Incumbent Democratic mayor Joseph S. Daddona sought re-election to a second consecutive and third overall term and saw a challenge from Republican salesman and activist Charles J. “Chuck” Theisen.

== Campaign ==
=== Democratic primary ===
Daddona was elected in the previous election, and sought to cement the Democratic party's dominance in the city's administration. Daddona's campaign was managed by local attorney Thomas Anewalt. Daddona faced two challenges in the Democratic primary, the first from longtime political opponent and insurgent Democratic city councilwoman Emma Tropiano, and Whitehall High School teacher Leonard Burkhart.

Tropiano was a dissenting voice in the city's Democratic establishment, disrupting the more liberal and progressive policies that the council wished to implement. Namely, Tropiano was in a personal rivalry with recently elected City Council President Watson W. Skinner which in turn resulted in a rivalry with the city's establishment Democrats. Tropiano was a vocal opponent of Daddona's policies, including opposing his increase to parking meter fares, and supporting the dismissal of city Solicitor Joseph Rosenfeld for a panel of Philadelphia attorneys. Mayors of Allentown used to directly appoint the city Solicitor without the opinion of either the public or city council with Daddona's pick, Rosenfeld, being criticized for failing to do his job adequately and being Daddona's campaign manager in 1981 with the city council demanding his removal. Daddona refused to comment on the issue, and engaged in time delays to postpone the removal of Rosenfeld from office. Tropiano, in part due to her opposition to Daddona, became a prominent voice for Rosenfeld's removal, and was ultimately successful; the position of city Solicitor was abolished and replaced by a panel of three attorneys appointed by the city council. Tropiano also opposed what she saw as excessive immigration to the city. She stonewalled a public hearing that took place regarding the council's stifling of Hispanic access to city resources. Tropiano also proposed abolishing the city's entire human resources department as a cost cutting measure.

Burkhart, a local social studies teacher who changed his party affiliation from Republican to Democrat just days before he announced his campaign, was running a competitive race and seemed to be a dark horse favorite to upset the nomination. Burkhart focused on reducing government expenses, stating that he would not accept a salary as Mayor, and would also freeze the pay of all municipal employees. Burkhart ran a grassroots campaign centered against bureaucracy and red tape within Allentown, stating that the municipal establishment creates hundreds of frivolous jobs to employ "supervisors," which are required by the city to not be in any labor union. Daddona argued that one supervisor for every eight city employees was a necessary ratio, while Burkhart argued that all new supervisor hirings should be frozen, which would save the city $1 million every year. Burkhart's campaign effectively ended when a scandal broke around his 1983 firing as manager of an Allentown swimming pool when it was alleged that he harassed the female staff. Burkhart had worked as a teacher during the school year, and as a pool manager during breaks, for a 13-year period, during which 13 female staff reported that Burkhart sought “social favors” for preferred work schedules and chores. Despite Burkhart maintaining his innocence, and that the report of harassment and his firings were "dirty politics", he would do poorly in the polls.

=== Republicans ===
The Republicans did not have a primary, instead the Lehigh County Republican Party's recruitment committee interviewed at least three candidates, with Party Chairman Charles Mackenzie selecting Charles Theisen, a campaign worker for two Republican mayoral candidates, Clifford Bartholomew, who won in 1970, and Samuel Fenstermacher, who lost in 1967 to Ray Bracy. Theisen, a U.S. Navy veteran from World War II who was born in Jersey City, New Jersey, moved to Allentown in 1944, to attend Muhlenberg College on a college basketball scholarship and was their head cross country and assistant basketball coach for ten years until 1970. He later owned a sporting goods store until 1983 and then worked as a salesman for Rileigh, Gander & Showalter, Inc, a showroom construction company. Theisen had never held public office, but he was a Republican committeeman for eight years in the city's 17th Ward, 3rd District and ran unsuccessfully for the Allentown School Board. He was also the campaign manager for Roy Hertz for State Representative in 1974 to the 132 district.

=== General election ===
Daddona would win the endorsement of all of the city's labor and traditionally Democratic organizations and some of the traditionally Republican organizations, including the Allentown-Lehigh County Chamber of Commerce and other professional and management-oriented associations.

After the election, Theisen conceded that he had entered the race with no intention of winning, with the race being lopsidedly in Daddona's favor the entire time, and instead ran a laid back quiet campaign, hoping that either Daddona made a mistake, or there was low turnout or some other quirk at the polls. Additionally, Theisen centered his campaign on federal and state budget cuts and the need for economic austerity and by attacking Daddona's “lost leadership," saying that he "has devoted too much time to raising flags and cutting ribbons" and “pursues a lust to be popular.” Daddona accepted the allegations as a positive, arguing that the mayor should be a popular public figure.

Key issues during the election included a scandal in which Daddona postponed having to testify in a federal court over a discrimination case levied by four former police officers against the city, who claimed to have been demoted due to political reasons until after the election. There was a contentious debate about the fate of a large industrial complex at Allentown Queen City Municipal Airport, located off Lehigh Street, which then had no tenant. Other issues included Daddona's claim of lower crime rates during his time in office, which Theisen denounced, saying, "You arrest less prostitutes, and you have less crime in the city." Daddona's position on reappointing unpopular embattled Democratic city Solicitor Joseph Rosenfeld became a debate topic, as well as the lack of municipal funds for economic development. Daddona and Theisen had a debate on October 23 hosted by WLVT-TV and sponsored by the Leagues of Women Voters from the Lehigh Valley's three largest cities, Allentown, Bethlehem, and Easton.

== Results ==
Mayor of Allentown election, November 6, 1985
Party	Candidate	Votes	%
Democratic	Joseph S. Daddona	13,210	69.57%
Republican	Chuck Theisen	5,778	30.43%
Total votes		18,988	100.00%
Democratic hold			

== Legacy ==
Reelections to consecutive terms for a mayor are rare in Allentown; the only other mayor to be re-elected to a consecutive term in the 20th century was Malcolm Gross. In his victory speech, Daddona congratulated Theisen for running an "aboveboard" campaign, saying, "I admire his willingness to work so hard in what I am sure many people told him would possibly be a losing battle."
