= Mayors of Allentown, Pennsylvania =

Mayors of a US city

Mayor of Allentown
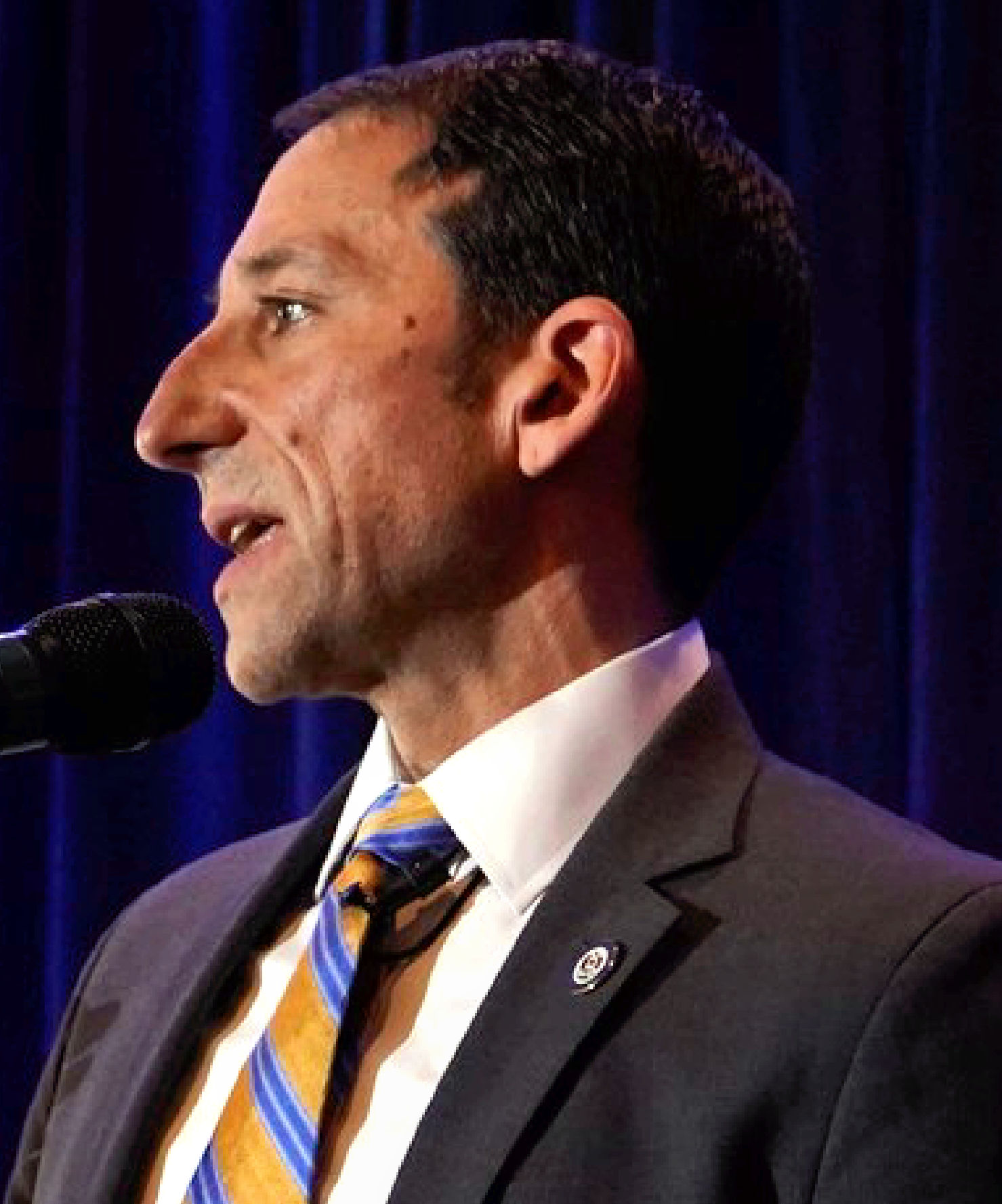
- Incumbent; Matthew Tuerk since January 3, 2022
- Term length: Four years (renewable once)
- Inaugural holder: Samuel McHose
- Formation: 1867
- Website: Mayor's Office

Allentown, Pennsylvania, now the third most-populous city in Pennsylvania, was founded in 1762 as Northampton Towne by William Allen, a wealthy shipping merchant.

== History ==
During its first 50 years of existence, Northampton Towne was a small unincorporated settlement, consisting of a few homes, stores, and taverns. After reaching a population of over 700 residents in the 1810 census, the Commonwealth of Pennsylvania gave Northampton Towne a legal existence on March 18, 1811, by incorporating it as the Borough of Northampton, in Northampton County. Previous to this Northampton Towne had community leaders. With its incorporation as a borough, however, the first local politicians were born. The first borough election was held at the tavern of George Savitz, a tavern-keeper who owned the Square and Compass, an inn located at the northeast corner of 7th and Hamilton streets in present-day Center City Allentown.

Peter Rhodes was chosen as the first burgess; George Rhoads as the town clerk; John F. Rhue as the High Constable, and a town council was established as the first civic legislature. Rhodes was a prominent citizen and shopkeeper who served on the Committee of Safety in Northampton Towne during the Revolutionary War. The first business of the borough government was to order cows to seek other pastures other than the public streets, an action that proved unpopular with Northampton Towne residents.

In 1812, Lehigh County was formed by partitioning a section of Northampton County, and Northampton Towne was designated as its county seat. Frederick Eckert was elected as the second burgess. George Graff was elected burgess in 1813; however, records of elections in Northampton Towne have been lost from the period 1815 to 1830.

On April 16, 1836, an act of the Pennsylvania General Assembly changed the name of the community from Northampton Towne to Allentown, and John P. Rhue was burgess. During its existence as a borough, Northampton Towne and then Allentown had a total of 47 annual municipal elections. A burgess was elected each year. The most prominent was John J. Krauss, who was elected five times in succession from 1830 to 1835. Other notable burgesses of the town were Samuel Runk (1839–1849); Robert E. Wright (1845), and Peter Wycoff (1846). In 1866, William Kern was elected burgess over Thomas Mohr by a vote of 974 to 881, Kern being the last burgess of Allentown

== Allentown mayors ==
In January 1866, Allentown's various ward districts were consolidated into the Allentown School District. This led to other consolidations of the various wards into centralized police departments, a treasurer, and a consolidated council. By the following year, in 1867, state legislation was proposed by Lehigh County State Senator George P. Shall to incorporate Allentown as a city.

The legislation was passed by the Pennsylvania Legislature on March 12, 1867, and the City of Allentown was established. The first city election was held less than two months later, on May 1. The first city charter specified a bicameral form of government, consisting of a Select Council of 14 (including the mayor) and a Common Council of 28 members.

=== First City Government Charter (1867) ===
Photo	Name	Term(s)	Party
Notes
	1 – Samuel Milton McHose	1867–1869	Republican
First mayor under the first Allentown City Charter, sworn into office on May 19, 1867. Born February 16, 1816, in Lower Saucon in Northampton County, the son of Isaac McHose. He founded the Allentown Fire Brick Works in 1854 at Front and Gordon streets. This company, later renamed McHose and Ritter, was in business for 25 years. He was a strong abolitionist activist during the 1850s, and was a delegate to the 1860 Republican National Convention in Chicago that nominated Abraham Lincoln in 1860. Between 1854 and 1873, McHose, an industrial contractor, "built nearly every iron furnace in the Lehigh Valley." As mayor, McHose encouraged industrial development of city after the end of the Civil War. After his term as mayor ended, he invested significantly in Hope Rolling Mills, which made railroad rail, and was a City Councilman for the Fifth Ward in 1884. Died April 21, 1893. Buried in Union and West End Cemetery, 12th and Chew Streets, Allentown.
	2, 5 – Colonel Tilghman H. Good	1869–1873; 1874–1876	Democrat
Born in South Whitehall Township on October 6, 1830. In 1838, his father died and he moved in with his uncle, Peter Blank, in Allentown. Good attended schools in early Allentown until 1846 when he became an apprentice with a shoemaker. He later moved to Philadelphia and furthered his education as a shoemaker, and returned to Allentown in 1850, where he opened a boot and shoe store. He began to work at the Allentown National Bank in 1855 as a teller, and in 1857 began to manage the Allen House hotel. The next year, in 1848, he ran for public office and was elected to the Pennsylvania state legislature. When the Civil War broke out in 1861, he organized the first Pennsylvania Volunteers in 1861. He later organized the 47th Pennsylvania Infantry during Civil War, and he commanded the regiment for three years. Good volunteered for service and was named as colonel of the 47th Pennsylvania Infantry, which he remained in active service until 1863. During the Civil War, he saw action in the Second Battle of Pocotaligo in South Carolina and the Battle of Mansfield in Louisiana. Upon his return to civilian life, he became the landlord of the American Hotel in Allentown, and in 1865 began a career in banking and real estate. In 1869, he replaced Samuel McHose, becoming the second mayor of Allentown. When his term ended in 1873, he returned to managing Allen House hotel. In 1874, he was again elected mayor following the death of Theodore C. Yeager. In 1876, Goode became hotel owner of prominent Hotel Allen, and in 1885, moved to Reading to take control of the Grand Central Hotel there on Penn Square. On the evening of June 18, 1887, he suffered a heart attack and died. He was buried in Allentown, in what is now the Old Allentown Cemetery, at 10th and Linden streets with military and full Masonic honors.
	3 – Dr. Theodore Conrad. Yeager	1873–1874	Republican
Born on April 1, 1838, Yeager was the first mayor born in Northampton Towne in present-day Allentown. He received his education at the Allentown Seminary, which is now Muhlenberg College, and Allentown Academy. Upon graduation, he went to learn the jewelry trade. Two years later, he entered medical school at the University of Pennsylvania, graduating in the spring of 1860. Shortly afterwards, he opened a medical practice and also entered the drug business. During the Confederate Invasion of Pennsylvania, he was called to service in the Union Army, acting as an assistant surgeon of the 51st Pennsylvania Infantry, Regiment E, and M during July and August 1863. After returning to Allentown, he resumed his medical practice and became assistant medical examiner for Lehigh County. In 1873 he entered politics, becoming the Third mayor of the City of Allentown in the Republican Party. In December 1874, owing to nervous prostration brought on by overwork, Mayor Yeager was forced to take to his bed, and he died on January 14, 1874. The Allentown Democrat, on January 21, 1874, wrote in his obituary, "Allentown never had a Chief magistrate of greater efficiency or more unswerving Integrity. Buried in Union and West End Cemetery, 12th and Chew streets, Allentown.
	4 – Herman Schuon	1874–1876	Non-Partisan
Born in Württemberg in Germany, February 22, 1835. Arrived in Allentown as a sixteen-year-old in 1851, entering first the hotel business. Volunteered for duty in the Civil War. After returning to civilian life, he opened a grocery store near 5th and Hamilton streets. Entered politics, representing the First Ward in the Select Council (City Council) in the late 1860s. Became president of Select Council and was appointed mayor, filling the unexpired term of Yeager upon his sudden death in 1874 by virtue of his office. Did not run for mayor in 1876 and left local politics. Schuon was an ardent musician and was a founder of the Allentown Band. Retired in 1892 and lived his latter years with his daughter. Died October 10, 1912, in Allentown. Buried in Union and West End Cemetery, 12th and Chew streets, Allentown.
	6 – Col. Edward B. Young	1876–1878	Republican
Known as the "Centennial Mayor". Popular mayor at the time, former chief magistrate. Born in Allentown on September 6, 1836, attended school at Allentown Academy, then learned watchmaking in Bellefonte, Pennsylvania. Returned to Allentown in 1855, going into business with the Barber, Young and Company hardware company. Served in the 49th Pennsylvania Infantry during the Civil War, fought in the Battle of Gettysburg, and then became head of Allentown Steam Heating and Power Company; took an active part in the organization of the Lehigh Valley Traction Company; director of Lehigh Valley Trust Company. Died on December 30, 1878, shortly after leaving office. Buried in Union and West End Cemetery, 12th and Chew streets, Allentown.
	7 – Dr. Alfred J. Martin	1878–1880	Democrat
Born 1837 in Allentown. Attended the early Allentown public schools for his elementary education, then attended the Allentown Academy. Was medical doctor, graduating from University of Pennsylvania in 1857. He appointed former mayor Tilghman H. Good as chief of police. Encouraged business growth and also supported health issues of Civil War veterans and their families providing them medical care. After his tenure as mayor, was a delegate to the Democratic presidential convention four times, beginning in 1880. Martin also served as a prison and coroner's position. He also was a trustee at St. Luke's Hospital and was a consulting physician at St Luke's. He was one of the founders of the Lehigh County Medical Society, and a director of the Allentown National Bank. Martin died on December 8, 1896, from complications of a cold. Buried in Fairview Cemetery, 855 Lehigh Street, Allentown.
	8 – Dr. Edwin G. Martin	1880–1884	Democrat
Brother of Alfred J. Martin, born October 3, 1836. Attended the early Allentown public schools for his elementary education, then attended the Allentown Academy. Was medical doctor, graduated from University of Pennsylvania in 1856. Joined his father, Dr Charles H Martin's medical practice, then took over the practice after his father's death. Was a member of the Lehigh Medical society and the Commonwealth of Pennsylvania Medical society. Was on the board of trustees of Allentown Women's College and was also a trustee of Muhlenberg College. In addition, Martin was a director of Allentown National Bank and president of the board of trade. Served the city as coroner from 1860 to 1863. Elected mayor in 1880, and re-elected in 1882. He generally continued the progressive initiatives of his brother during his term. Stepped down voluntarily in 1884 and returned to medical practice with his brother. Died August 30, 1893 Buried in Fairview Cemetery, 855 Lehigh Street, Allentown.
	9 – Edwin S. Shimer	1884–1886	Republican
Edward S Shimer was born in the former town of Shimersville in Northampton County, on July 12, 1832. He was a graduate of the Lutheran Seminary in Stewartsville, New Jersey, then moved to Allentown in 1849. He first worked at the dry goods store of H Guth & Company at 607 Hamilton Street, then as a clerk at Grim & Reninger. Shimer became a member of the firm, working there for 28 years. In 1879, he established a carpet, flooring and drapery business at 637 Hamilton Street. Entered politics in 1884 and was elected mayor. His administration was regarded as professional, taking great pride in the Allentown Police Force, which was a model of neatness and efficiency. Saw expansion of the city in population and size, being extended west to 15th Street. Stepped down voluntarily in 1886 to run for state senator; however, he was defeated by a small margin. Shimer then returned to his business, although retiring in failing health about 1890. He lived with his son, who was a physician until his death on March 14, 1902. Buried in Union and West End Cemetery, 12th and Chew streets, Allentown.
	10 – Werner Knauss Rhue	1886–1888	Democrat
Werner Knauss Rhue was born in Allentown in 1843. He attended the Allentown Public Schools, and later the Allentown Academy. He was a Civil War veteran, joining Company E, 5th Pennsylvania Infantry in 1862 as a private. In 1863, he enlisted again, in the 41st Pennsylvania Infantry. During his service, he saw combat in the battles of Gettysburg, Antietam, and South Mountain. Joined the Allentown Democrat newspaper upon his return to civilian life, which was published by his father and C Frank Haines. He purchased a half interest in the newspaper in 1865. Rhue also joined the Columbia Fire Company, No. 4, serving both as a volunteer fireman and as treasurer. In 1872 he was made Chief Engineer of the Allentown Fire Department, serving two years. In 1884, he was elected as a director of the Allentown National Bank. He ran for mayor of Allentown, and was elected in 1886 as a Democrat. Served a single term, stepping down in 1888. Afterward, he served as director of Allen Mutual Building and Loan Association, and president of the Allentown Hardware Company until 1897 when his health began to fail and retired. Rhue died on February 6, 1904. Buried in Fairview Cemetery, 855 Lehigh Street, Allentown.
	11, 13 – Henry Willard Allison	1888–1890; 1893–1896	Republican
Born in Catlettsburg, Kentucky, on July 8, 1846. His parents, James Willets and Mary McClellan Beal Allison were both born in Susquehanna County, Pennsylvania. After their marriage, they moved to Kentucky where they were engaged in shop-keeping. At the outbreak of the Civil War, the Allisons moved to Ironton, Ohio, where his father began working in the iron industry, and Henry Allison went to the local schools. He then also began working in the iron industry. In 1868 Allison moved to Hazleton, Pennsylvania, and began working in coal mining, later moving to Allentown where he joined the Allentown Rolling Mills in 1875, advancing into management as secretary and treasurer. In 1888, he was approached by the Republican Party to enter politics, which at first he declined but when others dropped out he was nominated to become mayor. During his term, streetcar service changed from horse-driven to electric powered in downtown. He left office in 1890, becoming the first President of the Livingston Club and other civic organizations. In 1893, he again became mayor, filling the unexpired term of Col. Samuel Lehr, then was elected again in 1894, stepping down in 1896. His term was noted by the expansion of the Allentown business district west to 12th Street in present-day Center City Allentown After stepping down, he entered banking upon the death of William H. Ainey, and took his place as director of the Allentown Second National Bank. He remained active in business and civic affairs until his death, passing on October 12, 1913. Buried in Fairview Cemetery, 855 Lehigh Street, Allentown.
	12 – Colonel Samuel D. Lehr	1890–1893	Republican
Born in Allentown on May 30, 1838. He attended the public schools in Allentown, and entered the business world at a very young age, first being employed in a brickyard, later with the Allentown and Auburn Railroad where he learned the engineering and construction trades. He then began working for the Allentown City Engineering department. On November 7, 1862, he enlisted for service in the Civil War and became Captain of Company B, 176th Pennsylvania Infantry. His regiment was subsequently sent to New Bern, North Carolina and then to Hilton Head, South Carolina, performing provost duty and construction work. In August 1863, he returned to Philadelphia, where he returned to civilian life. In September 1864, he was commissioned by Pennsylvania Governor Curtin to serve as a recruiting agent in West Virginia. He returned to Allentown in 1865, returning to work in the city's Engineering Office, becoming the City's Chief Engineer. Lehr also remained in the Pennsylvania militia. He organized the Allen Zouaves (Company H, 4th Pennsylvania Volunteer Infantry) on June 21, 1860, becoming Colonel of the Regiment on October 29, 1885. In 1890, he entered politics, running for mayor and was elected. During his term, he saw construction of new Allentown Lehigh Valley and Central Railroad of New Jersey passenger terminals, both in Allentown. Resigned in 1893, to enter private engineering practice. He remained active in business and civic affairs until the end of his life, rejoining Allentown City Counsel in November 1913. He lapsed into unconsciousness suddenly and died on May 18, 1915. Buried in Fairview Cemetery, 855 Lehigh Street, Allentown.
	14, 16, 25 – Fred Ewing Lewis	1896–1899; 1902–1905; 1932–1936	Republican
First three-term mayor of Allentown. Born in Allentown on February 8, 1865, the son of Mr and Mrs Samuel B. Lewis. He was educated in the Allentown public schools, then went on to study at the New Haven Collegiate and Commercial Institute in New Haven, Connecticut and then graduated from Muhlenberg College in 1887. He studied law and was admitted into the Pennsylvania Bar in 1888. He established a practice in Allentown, where he served as a bank president. First elected mayor in 1896, Defeated by James L. Shadt in 1899, was re-elected in 1902 before stepping down in 1905. He was elected as a Republican to represent Pennsylvania as an at-large delegate in the U.S. House of Representatives, serving a single term from March 4, 1913, to March 3, 1915. He returned to Allentown, engaging in his law practice and in banking. He organized and was president of the Merchants' National Bank and was president of the Dime Savings & Trust Co. in Allentown. Served a third term during the Great Depression years (1932–1936) then lost to Malcom T. Gross (Gross won a 4th Term). Remained prominent in city affairs until his death. Died June 27, 1949.
	15 – James L. Schaadt	1899–1902	Republican
Born in Ironton, Pennsylvania, on November 21, 1856, he attended North Whitehall Township schools, then Allentown Academy, and e graduated from Muhlenberg College in 1874. Lawyer and teacher, admitted to Pennsylvania Bar in 1878. Author of history of the Allen Infantry, one of five Pennsylvania companies, known as the "First Defenders", that went to Washington, D.C., in April 1861 to defend the nation's capital at the onset of the Civil War. Shaadt became active in politics being elected county solicitor for Lehigh County in 1887, serving four years. He also served as chairman of the Democratic county committee in 1888. An active volunteer fireman, he was a member of Liberty Fire Company No. 5. Schaadt also was interested in soldiering, enlisting as private in Company D, 4th Regiment Infantry, Pennsylvania National Guard in 1878. Later promoted to Sergeant, he was elected as Captain of the Company in 1890, serving for six years. He was sent to Homestead, Pennsylvania to help quell the riots in 1892. While serving in Homestead, he began a long distance campaign for District Attorney of Lehigh County, being elected and serving from 1893 to 1896. He then ran for Mayor of Allentown, serving from 1899 to 1902. During his term, the construction and dedication of the Soldier's and Sailor's Civil War monument at Center Square at 7th and Hamilton streets took place. Mayor during 1900 turn of the century, expanded telephone and electrification service to center city residents. In addition, new fire houses were built for the Pioneer No. 9, Franklin No. 10 and Allen No. 7 companies, as well as the rebuilding of the Liberty No. 5 house. He was also responsible for the establishment of a system of appointments for the Allentown Police Department according to civil service rules. He returned to private life in 1902 and became a trustee for Allentown Hospital and a president of Associated Charities, later the United Way. A widow from a first marriage, he met a boyhood sweetheart and remarried on August 27, 1924. He suffered a broken leg in an accident, and died from complications of that accident and died on September 15, 1924. Buried in Fairview Cemetery, 855 Lehigh Street, Allentown.
	17 – Dr. Alfred J. Yost	1905–1907	Democrat
Died in office, April 16, 1907. Alfred J. Yost was born in South Bethlehem on August 13, 1870. He was educated in the Bethlehem School District public schools and later attended Muhlenburg College, graduating in 1890. He then entered the University of Pennsylvania Medical School, graduating in 1893. He joined his father, also a physician in Salisbury Township later that year, although establishing his own office in early 1894 on South Sixth street in Allentown. In 1893, he was elected Lehigh Country Coroner, and was elected mayor in 1905. Yost's health began to fail and he asked for a leave of absence so he might spend some time in a climate which he thought might benefit him. Instead, his health grew worse and returned to Allentown. Mayor Yost is buried in Fairview Cemetery, 855 Lehigh Street, Allentown. His major notable legacy is the development with Harry Clay Trexler of West Park, first public park in Allentown. In 1904, a small boy playing baseball on the empty lot with friends sent a ball through the window of a Turner Street residence. He was taken downtown to the mayor's office by a policeman and was described as "very much frightened and dirty." Mayor Yost was very much upset by the action of the officer and asked what could be done to prevent similar proceedings. He suggested to Yost, who headed up the Water Bureau that the it give up the space and turn it over to a Parks Department, made up of Yost, himself and city Treasurer Al Reichenbach. It subsequently was done, and "City Park" as it was first known opened in 1908.
	18 – Dr. Charles D. Schaeffer	1907–1908	Democrat
Born in Maxatawny Township on November 4, 1864. Attended the Keystone School in Kutztown, Pennsylvania, then graduated with honors from Franklin and Marshall College in 1886. He then attended the medical school at the University of Pennsylvania, graduating in 1889. He moved to Allentown after graduation and began his medical practice. He was president of the Allentown Board of Health when Dr (Mayor) A J Yost's health failed and could no longer perform his duties as mayor. Shaeffer was appointed to fill the office and on April 22, 1907, he was selected by the City Select Council as mayor. During his time as mayor, Dr Schaeffer was most noted for development of Allentown Hospital Nursing College and plans for Allentown Water Works to improve public water supply that was contaminated by cesspools. After his term as mayor ended, Schaeffer became head surgeon at Allentown Osteopathic Hospital. He died of a heart attack on September 2, 1923. Buried in Fairview Cemetery, 855 Lehigh Street, Allentown.
	19 – Harry G. Stiles	1908	Democrat
Died in office, November 8, 1908, after 10 months as mayor. Harry Gibons Stiles was born in Allentown on December 16, 1856, and graduated from Allentown High School in 1874. He then studied at Muhlenberg College for two years, then transferred to Harvard University, graduating from Harvard in 1878. He was admitted to the Pennsylvania Bar in 1879. In 1884, he was nominated as a presidential elector, the youngest man at the time to be appointed to that position. In 1889, he was elected District Attorney of Allentown. In 1884, he was elected to the Pennsylvania State Senate, and elected as Mayor of Allentown in 1908. Buried in Fairview Cemetery, 855 Lehigh Street, Allentown.
	20 – Dr. Henry Herbert Herbst	1908–1909	Democrat
Henry Herbert Herbst was born in Trexlertown on May 22, 1858. He went to school at the Williston Seminary, Easthampton, Massachusetts, returning to Allentown and graduating from Muhlenberg College in 1878. He entered medical school at the University of Pennsylvania in 1878, graduating in 1881. He began his practice as the examining surgeon for the Pennsylvania Railroad in Wilmington, Delaware, then return to Allentown in 1883 and established his practice in the city. For two years, he was a physician for the Allentown Coroner's office; was city physician for the Poor Directors and was president of the board of health from 1890 to 1895. Herbst had a strong interest in politics, in 1893 being defeated by Henry W. Allison. He was appointed mayor by the Select Council in 1908 after the death of Henry G. Styles. During his term, he implemented plans for Allentown Water Works, also expanded public school system. In 1909, he defeated Samuel D. Lehr in the Democratic Primary, but was defeated by Charles O. Hunsicker. After his term as mayor, Herbst left public life and did a tremendous amount of work for the Allentown School District. Herbst died September 20, 1911. After his death, the Fifth Ward Elementary school was named after him, "Herbst School". Buried in Fairview Cemetery, 855 Lehigh Street, Allentown.
	21 – Charles O. Hunsicker	1909–1911	Republican
Born in Allentown on August 8, 1878. He graduated from Allentown High School in 1896, and studied at the Mercersburg Academy and Franklin and Marshall College, graduating in 1900. He then attended law school, graduating from the University of Pennsylvania Law School in 1903. He then returned to Allentown to open his practice. In 1909, at age 31, he was elected Mayor of Allentown, the youngest mayor in the city's history. Hunsicker was a developer of real estate, and it is estimated that he built more than 1,000 homes in the city, primarily in the West End. In 1938, he was made chairman of the committee to revise Allentown's building codes. Many of the homes he built were working-class row homes. He died September 27, 1941. After his death, Hunsicker Elementary School was named after him. He is buried in Fairview Cemetery, 855 Lehigh Street, Allentown.

=== Commission City Government Charter (1913) ===
Photo	Name	Term(s)	Party
Notes
	22 – Charles W. Rinn	1912–1915	Democrat
Born in Easton on October 6, 1868. Moved to Allentown in 1874, moving to 625 North 7th Street. He lived in that home until his death. Rinn assisted his father, a publisher of the Uaabhaengigar Republikanager, long the Democratic newspaper of Lehigh County. He later served as an apprentice jeweler and for a time followed the trade of a jeweler. He later went into the wholesale meat business, establishing the firm of E. E. Rinn and Company. From this, he became interested in politics. Rinn was elected mayor in 1911, and during his term he saw Allentown given Pennsylvania Third-Class City status (1913), leading to adoption of new city charter. First mayor under the commission form of government (1914) under which the mayor and four elected councilmen had served as full-time department heads. Under his administration, Rinn re-organized the Allentown Police department. Another accomplishment was the establishment of the Allentown-Bethlehem turnpike, now known as Hanover Avenue, which was the main gateway to the city of Allentown. He took over the work of Former Mayor Lehr, then a member of the city council and supervised the building of Hanover Avenue and the approach to West Hamilton Street. In common with the Police Department, the Allentown Fire department was completely reorganized. Mayor Rinn also inaugurated a custom of holding a Fourth of July celebration at the Allentown Fairgrounds, and the first city sewage system was built under his administration. He died October 7, 1920. He is buried in Fairview Cemetery, 855 Lehigh Street, Allentown.
	23 – Alfred L. Reichenbach	1915–1919	Non-Partisan
Born in Allentown on December 17, 1860. He attended the public schools of Allentown. Mayor during World War I. Born in 1860. Longtime (24 years) treasurer of Allentown. Responsible for $80,000 nurses home across the street from the Allentown Hospital built in 1914. Also noted for traveling to Europe in the early 1900s and seeing beautiful hanging gardens and floral lamp posts in Paris and in some cities in Germany. He was also an amateur horticulturist and enjoyed all varieties of flowers and anyone visiting the mayor's office during his tenure would find vases of flowers for all seasons on his desk and tables. In fact, it was he who had floral boxes planted outside the mayor's window so he, and his fellow citizens, could enjoy seasonal floral designs. He believed that it would be a good way to beautify the downtown shopping district and encouraged the city council with idea of purchasing the floral lamp posts during the renovations of Hamilton Street in 1916, taking down overhead electrical and telephone lines and moving them underground. In addition to renewing Hamilton Street, he led the effort to restore Trout Hall, paving city streets, installing floodlights for the Soldier's and Sailor's Monument in Center Square, remodeling City Hall, and the purchase of the southeast corner of 5th and Hamilton streets for a Civic Center (which later became the current Allentown Post Office). Reichenbach also saw the establishment of a modern Allentown Ambulance Service, and designed the current Allentown City Flag, and the deployment of local Pennsylvania National Guard volunteers into active service during World War I. He also coordinated the efforts of the city with the United States Army Ambulance Corps in the establishment of Camp Crane, and worked to keep the relationships between the trainees and the army cordial with the city and its residents. He was a supporter of the arts and encouraged music concerts, plays and the development of many early motion picture theaters. He died March 13, 1920. Buried in Fairview Cemetery, 855 Lehigh Street, Allentown.
	24, 26 – Malcolm W. Gross	1920–1932; 1936–1940	Democrat
Malcolm W. Gross was mayor of Allentown for four terms (16 years) during the 1920s and 1930s. Born 1872 in Allentown, he attended local schools and graduated from Allentown High School in 1890. He then attended Muhlenberg College, graduating in 1894. After graduation, he worked briefly for the Lehigh Valley Railroad as a clerk in Perth Amboy, NJ for several years before returning to Allentown in 1899. He was admitted to the Lehigh County Bar association in 1899 and began the practice of law. Gross entered politics in 1903 and was elected register of wills, returning to his law practice in 1906. However, in 1910, Gross was appointed by Mayor Reichenbach to be city solicitor. In 1920, Malcom W. Gross ran for mayor, succeeding Al Reichenbach. His first term was marked by the closing of the various Saloons and other alcohol-serving establishments in Allentown to be in compliance with the Volstead Act, which implemented Prohibition. He was re-elected in 1923 and again in 1927. During the 1920s, Gross worked closely with General Harry Trexler, who served on the city Planning Commission during that time, to create Allentown's park system. Developed Allentown Rose Garden (1928), purchased land for Little Lehigh Parkway (1928), and established Cedar Creek Park. He also greatly expanded the Allentown Airport, which was rededicated in 1929, saw construction of Tilghman Street Bridge, Americus Hotel and Pennsylvania Power & Light Buildings in Central Business District. He declined to run for re-election in 1931 due to a health condition and was succeeded by Fred E. Lewis, who began his third term, after being mayor in the late 1890s and early 1900s. In 1935, Malcom Gross again sought the office of mayor and was elected for a fourth term in a vigorously waged campaign. During these years, Gross's accomplishments were the acquisition of large Works Projects Administration (WPA) grants to provide work for the unemployed during the recovery from the Depression. Many WPA projects were funded and initiated, the structures in Lehigh Parkway and along Cedar Creek, as well as Union Terrace Park. He oversaw the conversion of General Harry Trexler's summer home, Springwood, in West Allentown and converting it to Trexler Memorial Park. Another project, no less important was the development of the Allentown Municipal Golf Course from land owned by General Trexler that was bequeathed to the city. Malcom Gross retired from public life in 1940 and returned to his law practice. He died January 21, 1944. The Allentown Rose Garden was renamed the Malcolm W. Gross Memorial Rose Garden in 1948 to recognize his efforts in developing the Allentown park system. Buried in Fairview Cemetery, 855 Lehigh Street, Allentown.
	27 – George F. Erich	1940–1944	Democrat
Born October 21, 1899, in Allentown and was educated in the Allentown Public School system. Graduated from Allentown High School in 1918. Prior to becoming mayor, Erich had nearly 50 years of experience as one of the largest coal and building supply dealers in Allentown. As mayor, Erich was a strong proponent of public housing and the demolition of buildings that were regarded as a health menace. He also led a program for the improvement of other sub-standard dwellings in the city. One way streets were established to facilitate the flow of traffic and he initiated an extensive street repaving program; he led a drive for the collection of delinquent taxes and established taxi stands to eliminate cruising taxis, taxicab drivers were required to be registered and to display proper identification. Also, examinations were mandated for all food handlers and to be certified in safe handling of food. Mayor Erich also stepped into the role of mediator and prevented several strikes which could have reached serious proportions. The United States entered World War II during his tenure as mayor. He encouraged a large number of metal scrap drives, coordinated Draft Boards and War Bond sales and parades. Allentown during Mayor Erich's term saw several major defense contracts come to the city, construction of Convair Field (Now Queen City Airport) for Consolidated Aircraft Vultee aircraft production. Large numbers of wartime houses and development of the Lehigh Street shopping area. Expansion of Mack Truck in SW Allentown. Use of Airport for Naval ROTC pilot training. Lehigh Structural Steel expanded for wartime needs. After leaving office, Erich returned to his business, but retained a strong interest in civic affairs. He died November 10, 1947. Buried in Fairview Cemetery, 855 Lehigh Street, Allentown.
	28, 30 – Brighton C. Diefenderfer	1944–1948; 1952–1956	Republican
Both January 1, 1902, in Allentown. Diefenderfer and Donald Hock exchanged terms as mayor during the post-World War II era and during the 1950s. Diefenderfer began his political career being elected Alderman in the 11th Ward in 1923, the same year he graduated from the University of Pennsylvania. He was the youngest alderman in Pennsylvania at the time. He held that post for 23 years until running for election as mayor in 1947, when he resigned. He lost that race and a subsequent bid for city council in 1949. While Alderman, he was also in the real estate and insurance business First elected as mayor in 1944, during his term, Allentown-Bethlehem-Easton (ABE) Airport new terminal opened in 1948. Visitors to Allentown included President Eisenhower and General Douglas MacArthur. Allentown School District Stadium opened in 1948. The last Lehigh Valley Transit streetcars ended service in 1953, being replaced by buses. Diefenderfer managed the transition from the Wartime industrial boom into the postwar peacetime prosperity, Hamilton Street being turned into a one way eastbound street between 6th and 10th streets. Cold War air raid drills in Allentown were carried out, and Civil Defense shelters were established in Allentown public schools during the mid–1950s. Under Diefendurfer and Donald Hock, industrial development of southwest Allentown expanded greatly, with Willard Batteries, Mack Trucks, Downyflake Foods, L.F. Grammes Company, Sarco Manufacturing, and Royal Crown Bottling establishing manufacturing plants in the southwest section of the city. He died April 8, 1982. Buried in Fairview Cemetery, 855 Lehigh Street, Allentown.
	29, 31 – Donald V. Hock	1948–1952; 1956–1960	Democrat
Born 5 January 1910 in Catasaqua. Graduated from Muhlenberg College in 1931, and from the University of Pennsylvania Law School in 1935. He was a lawyer in Lehigh County since 1936 and an army veteran of World War II, serving with the military police. Elected mayor in 1947. While mayor, he pushed enactment of a wage tax for Allentown; established a meter maid system for parking enforcement. He urged support of legislation that would provide low-income rental housing. During the postwar era, Hock acquired Convair Field from the War Assets Administration and developed it into Queen City Airport. In 1957, it was Hock's idea to expand Allentown's St. Patrick's Day parade from a parochial observance to a citywide spectacle embracing the theme of brotherhood. After the first citywide parade proved a success, Hock wrote a letter stating: "Today democracy really marched down Hamilton Street." The renovation of the Soldiers & Sailor's Monument was carried out, replacing the "Goddess of Liberty" Statue with a newer version. The Hamilton Street Bridge across the Lehigh River was replaced. Dieruff High School opened in 1958, Allen High School Linden Street Wing opened in 1957. South Mountain Jr. High School opened 1960. Died February 13, 1986.
	32 – John T. "Jack" Gross	1960–1964	Democrat
Died in office, September 3, 1964. Born March 5, 1909, in Allentown. Son of longtime former mayor Malcom W. Gross. He attended Muhlenberg College but was forced to leave school before graduation because of the Great Depression. He worked for many years for Pennsylvania Power & Light Company and for the State Department of Economic Development. He was elected in his first attempt at politics, defeating Incumbent Mayor Donald Hock in the May 1959 Democratic Primary. He went on to defeat Republican Ezra Fetzer in the November 1959 general election. Both Vice-President Richard Nixon and Senator John Kennedy led large campaign rallies during the 1960 Presidential Election on Hamilton Street. Accomplishments during Gross's administration were the development of an industrial park at Queen City Municipal Airport and the Fourth Street Urban Renewal Project, in with the 400 block of Hamilton Street was raised and a new Leigh County Courthouse and Allentown City Hall were built, along with a Cinema and a Hotel Complex after his death. A high-rise retirement senior retirement center of 150 units, began construction under his term, later named John T. Gross Towers, which opened in 1967. Allentown was selected in 1963 as an "All-America City" and the 1962 Bicentennial celebration were highlights of his administration, marked by a 7-hour parade down Hamilton Street in July 1962, along with other celebratory events during 1962. In 1961 Mack Trucks was threatening to move from Allentown and he worked closely with Mack executives to provide them tax benefits to keep them competitive. He also worked closely with the Industrial Development Corporation of Lehigh Country in soliciting new manufacturing firms to locate in Allentown. Running for re-election in 1963, Gross defeated former Mayor Brighton Diefenderfer to win a second term. In 1964, Gross began initial studies of downtown shopping district and first initiate to ban traffic and turn it into a pedestrian shopping area, which later became Hamilton Mall in 1973.
	33 – F. Willard Harper	1964–1966	Republican
Born November 28, 1928, in Shenandoah, Schukill County. Appointed mayor by city council after death of John Gross. During his 15-month term, Harper saw the completion of several initiatives of Mayor Gross, including the redevelopment of the Allentown Wire Mill area along South Lehigh Street and the former Lehigh Valley Railroad yards north of Race and Hamilton streets. Saw construction of Trexler Jr. High School (opened 1967). After his term, was president of Merritt Lumber Company until 1977. Died January 12, 1981, in Allentown. Buried at Fairview Cemetery, Boyertown, Pennsylvania.
	34 – Raymond B. Bracy	1966–1970	Democrat
Born January 29, 1901. Head of large local construction company before entering politics as city councilman in 1962. Became mayor in 1966 during turbulent 1960s societal changes. Allentown escaped many of the difficulties of larger cities with substantial minority populations by encouraging equal rights for all of its citizens. Bracy cited as achievements the virtual completion of the citywide sanitary sewer service with short-term financing bonds; the expansion of the sewage treatment plant; the expansion of public housing to Cumberland Gardens; the establishment of the Allentown Human Relations Commission, and the fulfillment of various public works programs. Bracy also began changes to city charter to revise into current form of mayor-council government. Saw massive redevelopment project along Lawrence Street, eliminating blighted housing that dated back to the late 1800s. Also authorized late-night (9 pm) shopping close for Hamilton Street stores on Monday nights to help downtown merchants compete with the new Whitehall Mall. Defeated by Joseph Daddona in 1969 Democratic primary, and retired from politics. Ray Bracy passed on March 10, 1983, in Allentown.

=== Strong Mayor City Government Charter (1970) ===
Photo	Name	Term(s)	Party
Notes
	35 – Clifford S. J. "Chips" Bartholomew	1970–1974	Republican
Born June 12, 1904, in Allentown. Was the first "Strong Mayor" under current mayor-council form of government (1970). Was educated in the Allentown School District, graduating in 1922 from Allentown High School. He was class president, a varsity football player and the business manager of The Canary and Blue, the school literary magazine. He went on to obtain a bachelor's degree from Muhlenberg College in 1926 and a master's degree in education from Columbia University in 1933. Prior to his service as mayor, was long-time educator, having 43 years of service in the Allentown School District. Was a teacher at Sheridan Elementary from 1926 to 1927 and a teacher, guidance counselor, and principal at Harrison-Morton Junior High School from 1927 to 1945. Principal of Allentown (later William Allen) High School, 1946–1969. During tenure as mayor, the city activated a 911 emergency dispatching system, established the police department's K-9 Corps, constructed Keck Park and initiated a citywide newspaper recycling program. Lehigh Valley Transit ended public bus service, replaced by governmental LANTA (Lehigh and Northampton Transit Authority). The Allentown Drug Commission and the Allentown Council of Youth also were established. The most lasting legacy of the Bartholomew administration however, was the renovation of the Hamilton Street Central Business District into the "Hamilton Mall". The project converted the area along Hamilton Street between Tenth and Sixth into a large shopping area, with the existing street removed and replaced by a raised brick walking surface. Large, enclosing canopies were built on each side of the street to provide shoppers protection from the weather. Construction of Hamilton Mall began in early 1972, with construction lasting until November 1973. Bartholomew was defeated in the May 1973 Republican primary election for a second term by LeRoy Bogert in an upset, losing by 216 votes. After leaving office in January 1974, he served 12 years as director of the Lehigh County Historical Society and planned educational programs at the society's museums. He was also executive director and coordinator of the Lehigh County Bicentennial Committee. He also served as head of numerous civic posts. He was named "Educator of the Century." Bartholomew retired from public life in 1996 after suffering a stroke. With his health in decline, he and his wife moved to Anderson, Indiana to be close to their son Charles, an automobile industry executive. Bartholomew died on January 5, 1999, at age 94. Buried at Greenwood Cemetery, 2010 W Chew St, Allentown, Pennsylvania.
	36, 38 – Joseph S. Daddona	1974–1978; 1982–1994	Democrat
Born August 14, 1933, in Allentown. Four-term mayor of Allentown over two separate periods. A two-term city councilman, first elected in 1967. He won his first of four terms as mayor in 1973 and held the office of Allentown mayor for 16 of the next 20 years. Graduated from Allentown High School in 1951. Unable to afford college tuition, he enlisted in the Navy. After his 4-year stint he enrolled at Lehigh University and graduated with a degree in civil engineering. Still politically controversial as mayor, accomplishments included the introduction of 911 dialing, the first waste-recycling programs, new parks and fire stations, the extensions of Martin Luther King Jr. Drive and the Basin Street underpass, and Mayfair and Super Sunday events. Mayor when Allentown received its second All-America City award from the National Municipal League in 1975. Lost his re-election to Republican Frank Fischl by just 121 votes in 1977. Returned to office in 1981 and in 1991 worked to convert the empty A&B meat factory and slaughterhouse at Hamilton and Front Streets into "Lehigh Landing", a park and museum complex. In 1983 Daddona requested that Billy Joel donate royalties from his song Allentown to set up a scholarship fund for aspiring artists. Daddona stepped down as mayor in 1994 and later hosted local radio talk show and a weekly television show called Lehigh Valley Crossfire for several years, retiring in 1997. Died June 5, 2004, in Allentown. Buried at Our Lady of Mount Carmel Cemetery, Fullerton, Pennsylvania.
	37 – Colonel Frank R. Fischl, Jr.	1978–1982	Republican
Born in Allentown, October 25, 1926. He graduated from Allentown High School in 1945. After a two-year enlistment in the United States Army Air Forces, he was accepted by the United States Military Academy at West Point. At West Point, where he lettered in football, basketball and track. His 1950 football team was nationally ranked second. After graduation in 1951, he entered the United States Air Force accumulating over 5000 hours in multi-engine jets and supersonic jet fighters. Fischl flew combat missions in Korea and Vietnam. Throughout his career, he was awarded the Silver Star, the nation's third highest medal for valor, two Distinguished Flying Crosses, eleven Air Medals, two Battle Stars and the Legion of Merit for meritorious service. He was a graduate of the Industrial College of the Armed Forces, Washington, D.C., and earned an MBA from Syracuse University. On a tour of duty at the United States Air Force Academy, he served as Director of Intercollegiate Athletics. His last assignment was Director of Safety for the U. S. Air Force in Europe. Fischl entered Allentown politics in 1978, winning the election for mayor by 121 votes. He pursued aggressive economic development policies, establishing tax abatement zones that offered tax breaks to businesses to develop properties and boost commerce. Two examples included what is today the Crowne Plaza Hotel and the Wachovia corporate offices. Had quadruple bypass operation; did not seek second term. After leaving office, Fischl was inducted into the Lehigh Valley Chapter of the National Football Hall of Fame in 1991. That same year he completed a full term on the Public Utility Commission appointed by Governor Richard Thornburgh. He died October 14, 2016, aged 89. Buried at Grandview Cemetery, 2735 Walbert Ave, Allentown, PA.

=== Home Rule City Government Charter (1996) ===
Photo	Name	Term(s)	Party
Notes
	39 – William L. Heydt	1994–2002	Republican
Born in Allentown, January 1938. Owner of Heydt Insurance Agency, Inc. Elected in 1993 (51.9%), re-elected in 1997 (54.42%). Pursued aggressive economic development policies. Purchased former Hess Brother's building and was instrumental in sale for redevelopment as The Plaza at PPL Center. Established the "Lights in the Parkway" Christmas Display in Little Lehigh Parkway. In 1998, Heydt joined with the Allentown Economic Development Corporation (AEDC) to renovate the vacant Lehigh Portland Cement building on Hamilton Street into a desperately-needed downtown campus for the Lehigh-Carbon Community College. Term marked a series of disasters beyond his control – the collapse of Corporate Plaza, two record snowstorms, gas explosions on Wyoming Street and at Gross Towers. It was under Heydt between 1997 and 1999 the sidewalk canopies of the 1973 Hamilton Mall renovation were taken down along with much of the street-level lighting. The last canopy was removed in front of the former H. Leh & Company building, and the street addresses were changed back to "Hamilton Street" in August 1999. Heydt passed on April 27th, 2025
	40 – Roy C. Afflerbach	2002–2006	Democrat
Born February 6, 1945, in Allentown. Former Pennsylvania State Senator. Elected in 2001 (52.9%). Shortly after taking office he performed a disastrous reorganization of the Allentown Police Department. In addition, new contracts with the police and fire departments were negotiated in 2002. The result was that the city was nearly bankrupted. After the results became apparent, Afflerbach proposed to lay off 53 city employees to balance the budget in 2004. The remainder of his term in office was mired in difficulty dealing with Allentown's city council. Allentown School District Stadium renamed J. Birney Crumb Stadium, Linden Street stands removed during renovation. Declined re-election after single term. After leaving office, moved to Red Lion, PA and became principal of the Afflerbach Group, a networking public policy advocacy organization that focuses upon service to non-profit professional organizations.
	41 – Edwin E. "Ed" Pawlowski	2006–2018	Democrat
Second four-term mayor of Allentown. Born in Chicago, Illinois, June 4, 1965. Moved to Allentown area, 1996, city, 2000. Previously served as executive director of Lehigh Housing Development Corporation; later became director of community and economic development for Allentown under Mayor Afflerbach. Elected mayor after Afflerbach declined re-election in 2005. Elected in 2005 (58.6%), re-elected in 2009 (73.6%), 2013 (62%) and 2017 (39%). After taking office, Pawlowski addressed the city's financial crisis that he inherited. In addition, about 25–30 percent of the police department had retired. Pawlowski was able to renegotiate the bad contract and balance the budget by selling off city assets. After putting Allentown back on a financial footing, his major initiative was the Central Business District Redevelopment project as a result of Neighborhood Improvement Zone (NIZ) legislation passed by the Pennsylvania legislature in 2009. The PPL Center, which he fought vigorously to build, was the anchor of the NIZ–the tool that effectively brought businesses back to the city. The NIZ resulted in millions of dollars being invested in Allentown and developments of large office buildings and apartment complexes in the main "Downtown" area. In addition, upscale restaurants replaced vacant storefronts and pre-war rowhouses. In 2008, Coca-Cola Park, an 8,278-seat baseball park was opened for the Lehigh Valley Iron Pigs, the AAA farm team of the Philadelphia Philies baseball team. Also, in 2014, construction was completed on the PPL Center, a 9,000-seat hockey arena for the Lehigh Valley Phantoms, the AHL affiliate of the Philadelphia Flyers. However, about 2009, Pawlowski began working with a campaign advisor named Michael Fleck, and he started setting his sights on higher office. Pawlowski and Fleck started reaching out more and more for financial support for Pawlowski to run for governor and later senator. And this, eventually, landed them in trouble. It was during his run for Senate in 2015 that, according to federal prosecutors, Pawlowski started soliciting donations to his campaign in exchange for preferential treatment from the city. In July 2017, Pawlowski was charged in United States District Court with 54 criminal felony charges, including conspiracy to commit mail fraud, bribery and soliciting, extortion under color of official right, mail fraud, wire fraud and honest services mail fraud. He was the first mayor of Allentown to be indicted with criminal charges. In the 2017 municipal general election, Allentown voters passed a ballot initiative to put a two-term limit on mayors, although Pawlowski was not affected due to a grandfather clause. Pawlowski resigned on March 9, 2018, after being convicted of 47 felony counts in United States District Court. City Council President Roger MacLean assumed the duty as acting mayor under Section 304 of the City Home Rule Charter on after resignation of Ed Pawlowski on 8 March 2018. MacLean was replaced by Interim Mayor Ray O'Connell on 29 March.
	42 – Ray O'Connell	March 29, 2018 – January 3, 2022	Democrat
Ray O'Connell was born in Allentown on December 10, 1949. O’Connell began working in the Allentown School District in 1972 after getting his B.S. from Kutztown University. In 1977 he completed his master's degree in education from Lehigh and in 1982 received his Elementary and Secondary Principal Certification. In the ASD, he was a teacher, assistant principal, principal, executive director of secondary education, and human resources consultant. In 2009, O’Connell left the ASD and was elected to Allentown City Council, being elected council president. Stepped down in 2017 to run for mayor and was defeated in the primary election by Ed Pawlowski. He later ran as a write-in candidate and was also defeated. In March 2018, after Pawlowski's resignation, O’Connell was selected as interim mayor by city council. On May 21, 2019, O’Connell won the Democratic nomination in the election to fill Pawlowski's mayoral term. On November 5 2019, O'Connell was elected 66% to 33% to fill the unexpired term of Ed Pawlowski. In filling out Pawlowski's term, O’Connell's primary achievement was to restore the integrity of Allentown's municipal government in the wake of the Pawlowski's resignation and restore employee morale at City Hall after the FBI investigation. He also raised property taxes in the city by 27% in 2019 to stabilize the city's finances. In 2020 and 2021, O'Connell was hampered by the COVID-19 pandemic, which forced hiring freezes and cuts to non-essential personnel. O'Connell was defeated in the May 2021 Democratic primary election amid criticism for his response to the pandemic and a perception of declining quality of life during his tenure.
	43 – Matthew Tuerk	Jan 3, 2022 – Present	Democrat
Matt Tuerk entered the May 2021 Democratic primary election and was the victor over incumbent Ray O'Connell and several others in a crowded field. Tuerk then defeated Republican Tim Ramos in the 2021 general election 63.5% to 34.6%. Born to a Cuban-American family in East Stroudsburg, Pennsylvania, in 1975. Tuerk moved to Boulder, Colorado in 1984 and lived there until completing high school in 1993 . Received an MBA in 2004 from the University of South Carolina, Columbia. In 2008, Tuerk took a position with the Allentown Economic Development Corporation. In 2013, he joined Don Cunningham to transform the Lehigh Valley Economic Development Corporation. In 2020, he stepped down to run for Mayor and is the city's first Latino mayor.

== See also ==
- Allentown government
- Allentown history
