= Upper Hanover Township, Pennsylvania =

Township in Pennsylvania, US

Upper Hanover Township
- Township
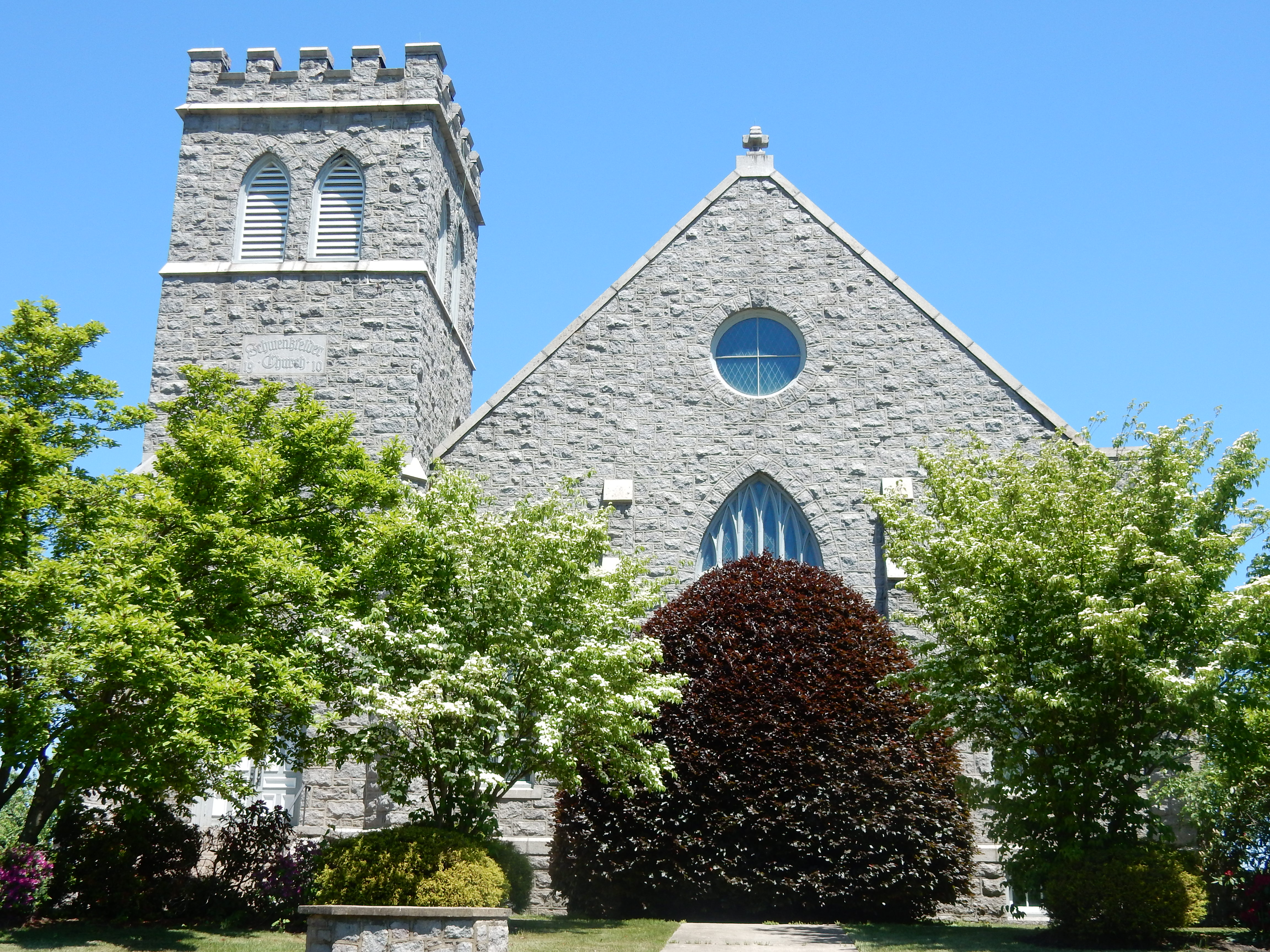
- Palm Schwenkfelder Church (1910). Palm.

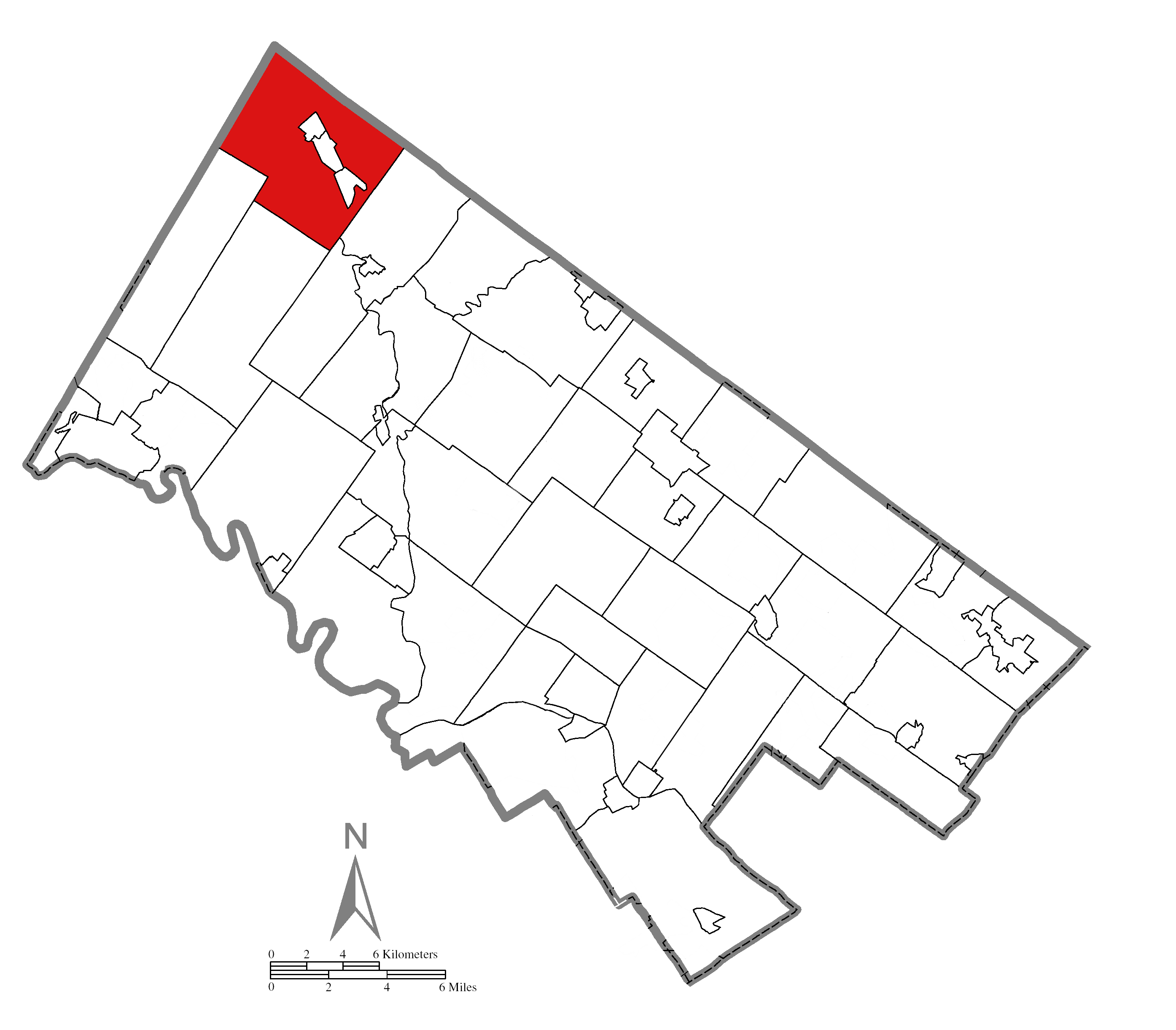
- Location of Upper Hanover Township in Montgomery County
- Coordinates: 40°22′00″N 75°29′35″W
- Country: United States
- State: Pennsylvania
- County: Montgomery

Area
  - Total: 21.17 sq mi (54.8 km^{2})
  - Land: 20.24 sq mi (52.4 km^{2})
  - Water: 0.94 sq mi (2.4 km^{2})
- Elevation: 381 ft (116 m)

Population (2010)
  - Total: 6,464
  - Estimate (2016): 7,465
  - Density: 319.4/sq mi (123.3/km^{2})
- Time zone: UTC-5 (EST)
  - Summer (DST): UTC-4 (EDT)
- ZIP codes: 18041, 18070, 18073, 18076, 19504
- Area codes: 215, 267, and 445
- FIPS code: 42-091-79064
- Website: www.upperhanovertownship.org

Upper Hanover Township is a township in Montgomery County, Pennsylvania, United States. The population was 6,464 at the 2010 census.

It is part of the Upper Perkiomen School District.

== History ==
Upper Hanover Township was formed from a portion of the original Hanover Township in 1741.

== Geography ==
According to the U.S. Census Bureau, the township has a total area of 21.2 square miles (55 km^{2}), of which 20.2 square miles (52 km^{2}) is land and 1.0 square mile (2.6 km^{2}), or 4.62%, is water. It is drained by Perkiomen Creek into the Schuylkill River and contains most of the Green Lane Reservoir. It consists mainly of rolling hills, and the only mountainous area is east of Palm on Mill Hill, which contains Montgomery County's highest point.

The township's villages include Chapel (also in Berks County), Fruitville, Geryville (also in Bucks County and pronounced with a hard "g"), Palm, and Perkiomen Heights.

=== Adjacent municipalities ===
- Marlborough Township (southeast)
- Upper Frederick Township (south)
- New Hanover Township (south)
- Douglass Township (southwest)
- Washington Township, Berks County (west)
- Hereford Township, Berks County (northwest)
- Upper Milford Township, Lehigh County (tangent to the north)
- Lower Milford Township, Lehigh County (northeast)
- Milford Township, Bucks County (east)

The following three boroughs form a cluster along Route 29 surrounded by Upper Hanover and are listed in north-to-south order:

- East Greenville
- Pennsburg
- Red Hill

== Climate ==
The township has a hot-summer humid continental climate (Dfa) and is in hardiness zone 7a.

Climate data for Upper Hanover Twp (Elevation: 489 ft (149 m)) 1981 - 2010 Averages
Month	Jan	Feb	Mar	Apr	May	Jun	Jul	Aug	Sep	Oct	Nov	Dec	Year
Mean daily maximum °F (°C)	37.8 (3.2)	41.1 (5.1)	49.8 (9.9)	61.7 (16.5)	72.1 (22.3)	80.8 (27.1)	84.9 (29.4)	83.2 (28.4)	76.2 (24.6)	64.5 (18.1)	53.3 (11.8)	41.8 (5.4)	62.4 (16.9)
Daily mean °F (°C)	29.3 (−1.5)	31.9 (−0.1)	39.7 (4.3)	50.5 (10.3)	60.4 (15.8)	69.5 (20.8)	74.0 (23.3)	72.3 (22.4)	64.8 (18.2)	53.2 (11.8)	43.5 (6.4)	33.5 (0.8)	52.0 (11.1)
Mean daily minimum °F (°C)	20.8 (−6.2)	22.7 (−5.2)	29.6 (−1.3)	39.2 (4.0)	48.7 (9.3)	58.3 (14.6)	63.0 (17.2)	61.4 (16.3)	53.4 (11.9)	41.9 (5.5)	33.7 (0.9)	25.2 (−3.8)	41.6 (5.3)
Average precipitation inches (mm)	3.27 (83)	2.71 (69)	3.55 (90)	3.86 (98)	4.27 (108)	4.21 (107)	4.83 (123)	3.90 (99)	4.63 (118)	4.26 (108)	3.65 (93)	3.75 (95)	46.89 (1,191)
Average relative humidity (%)	68.4	65.1	60.6	59.5	63.6	69.0	69.0	71.8	72.9	71.4	70.4	70.7	67.7
Average dew point °F (°C)	20.2 (−6.6)	21.5 (−5.8)	27.2 (−2.7)	36.9 (2.7)	48.0 (8.9)	58.9 (14.9)	63.2 (17.3)	62.7 (17.1)	55.9 (13.3)	44.2 (6.8)	34.5 (1.4)	25.0 (−3.9)	41.6 (5.3)
Source: PRISM

== Demographics ==
Historical population
Census	Pop.	Note	%±
1850	1,741		—
1860	2,125		22.1%
1870	2,197		3.4%
1880	2,408		9.6%
1890	1,977		−17.9%
1930	1,513		—
1940	1,513		0.0%
1950	1,762		16.5%
1960	2,293		30.1%
1970	2,727		18.9%
1980	3,870		41.9%
1990	4,604		19.0%
2000	4,885		6.1%
2010	6,464		32.3%
2020	8,350		29.2%
U.S. Decennial Census

As of the 2010 census, the township was 94.7% White, 1.5% Black or African American, 0.1% Native American, 1.5% Asian, 0.1% Native Hawaiian and Other Pacific Islander, 0.5% were Some Other Race, and 0.7% were two or more races. 1.8% of the population were of Hispanic or Latino ancestry.

As of the census of 2000, there were 4,885 people, 1,737 households, and 1,433 families residing in the township. The population density was 241.6 inhabitants per square mile (93.3/km^{2}). There were 1,764 housing units at an average density of 87.2 per square mile (33.7/km^{2}). The racial makeup of the township was 98.06% White, 0.70% African American, 0.14% Native American, 0.31% Asian, 0.33% from other races, and 0.47% from two or more races. Hispanic or Latino of any race were 0.80% of the population.

There were 1,737 households, out of which 33.9% had children under the age of 18 living with them, 74.4% were married couples living together, 4.3% had a female householder with no husband present, and 17.5% were non-families. 14.4% of all households were made up of individuals, and 6.7% had someone living alone who was 65 years of age or older. The average household size was 2.81 and the average family size was 3.10.

In the township the population was spread out, with 24.8% under the age of 18, 6.3% from 18 to 24, 26.4% from 25 to 44, 29.8% from 45 to 64, and 12.6% who were 65 years of age or older. The median age was 40 years. For every 100 females, there were 102.4 males. For every 100 females age 18 and over, there were 100.5 males.

The median income for a household in the township was $65,018, and the median income for a family was $69,410. Males had a median income of $40,584 versus $30,701 for females. The per capita income for the township was $24,978. About 3.2% of families and 3.4% of the population were below the poverty line, including 2.0% of those under age 18 and 6.1% of those age 65 or over.

== Transportation ==
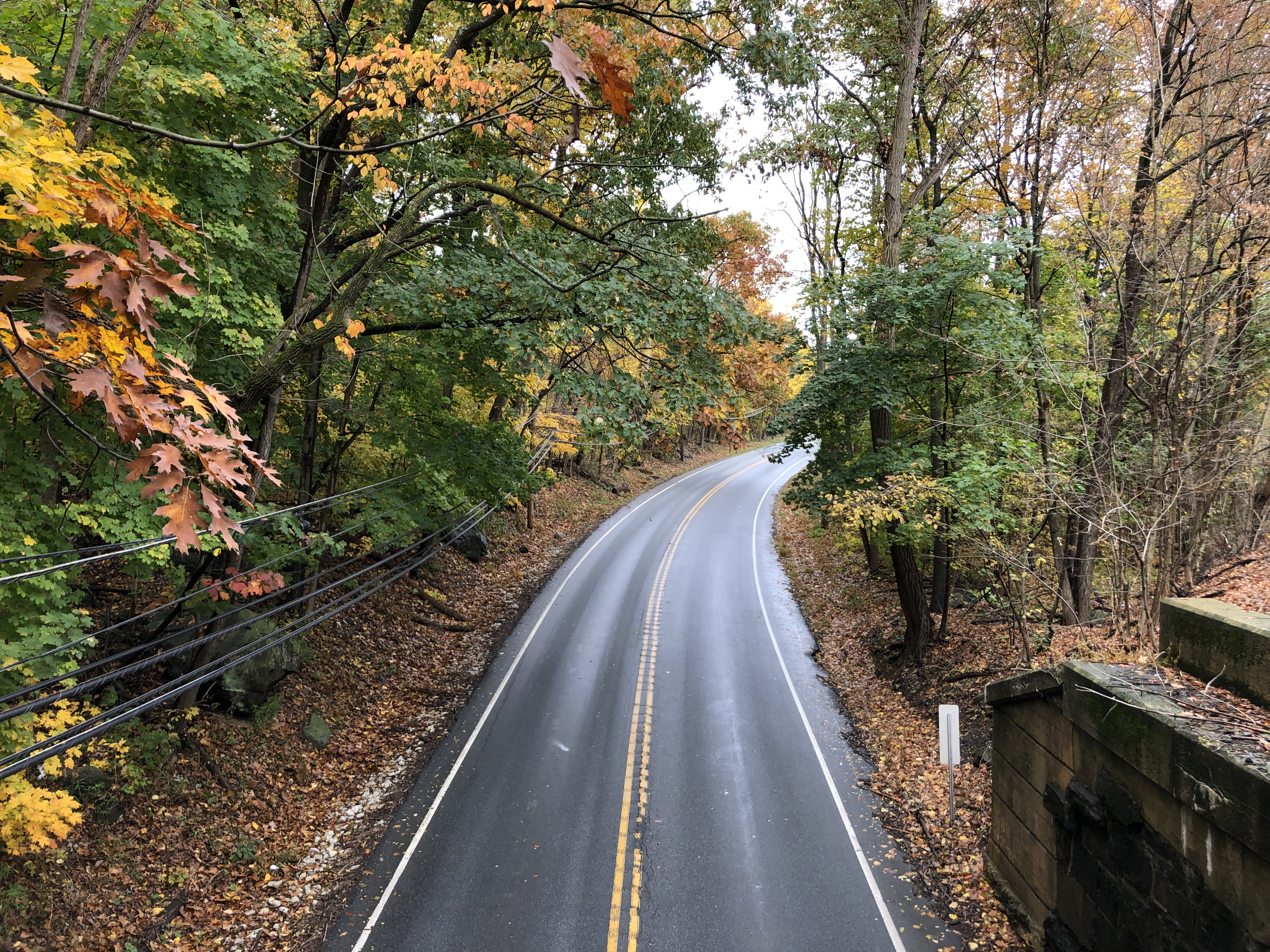
PA 29 southbound in Upper Hanover Township

As of 2019, there were 75.17 miles (120.97 km) of public roads in Upper Hanover Township, of which 16.93 miles (27.25 km) were maintained by the Pennsylvania Department of Transportation (PennDOT) and 58.24 miles (93.73 km) were maintained by the township.

Pennsylvania Route 29 and Pennsylvania Route 663 are the main highways traversing Upper Hanover Township. PA 29 follows the Gravel Pike on a northwest-to-southeast alignment through the township, while PA 663 follows John Fries Highway and Layfield Road on a southwest-to-northeast alignment. Other local roads of note include Church Road, Geryville Pike, Kutztown Road/Knight Road, School House Road, and Water Street.

== Politics and government ==
Presidential elections results
Year	Republican	Democratic
2020	56.9% 2,890	41.6% 2,112
2016	58.9% 2,257	36.7% 1,408
2012	56.3% 1,833	41.9% 1,364
2008	51.0% 1,639	48.0% 1,543
2004	55.7% 1,480	43.8% 1,165
2000	55.8% 1,075	40.4% 778
1996	49.4% 841	37.2% 633
1992	42.0% 754	33.3% 598

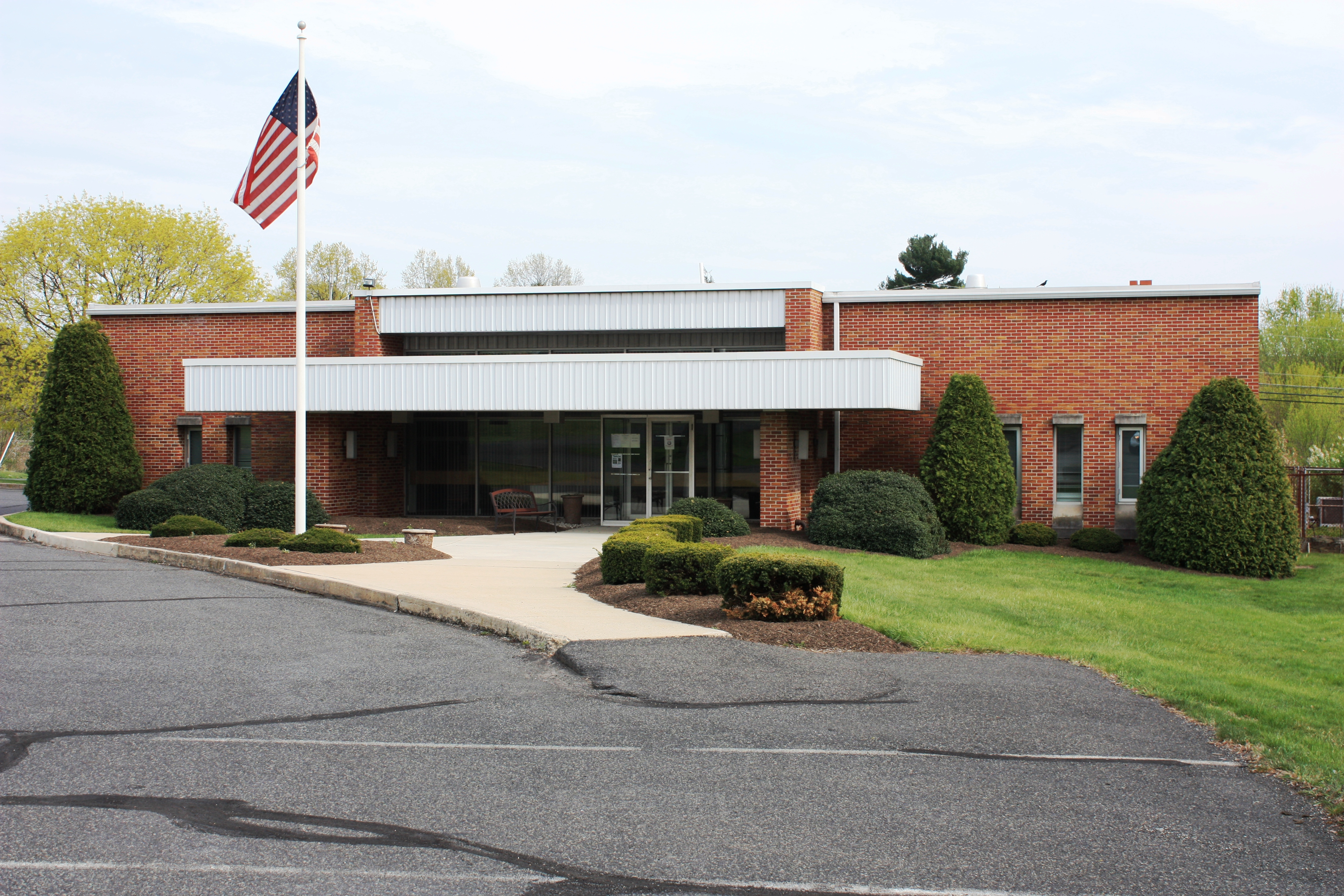
Upper Hanover Township Building

=== Legislators ===
- US Representative Brian Fitzpatrick, Republican, 1st district
- State Senator Tracy Pennycuick, Republican, 24th district
- State Representative Milou Mackenzie, Republican, 131st district

=== Board of Supervisors ===
Upper Hanover is a second-class township with five supervisors elected at-large.

- Richard Fain, Chairman
- Eugene Fried, Vice-chairman
- Dorothy Diehl, Assistant Secretary
- Ben Fiorito, Assistant Treasurer
- Steven Rothenberger, Realtor and habitat seller

== Gallery ==
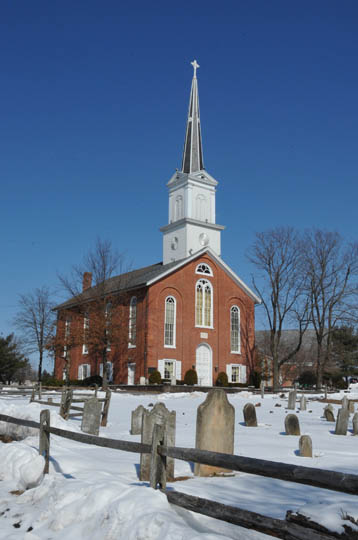
New Goshenhoppen Reformed Church

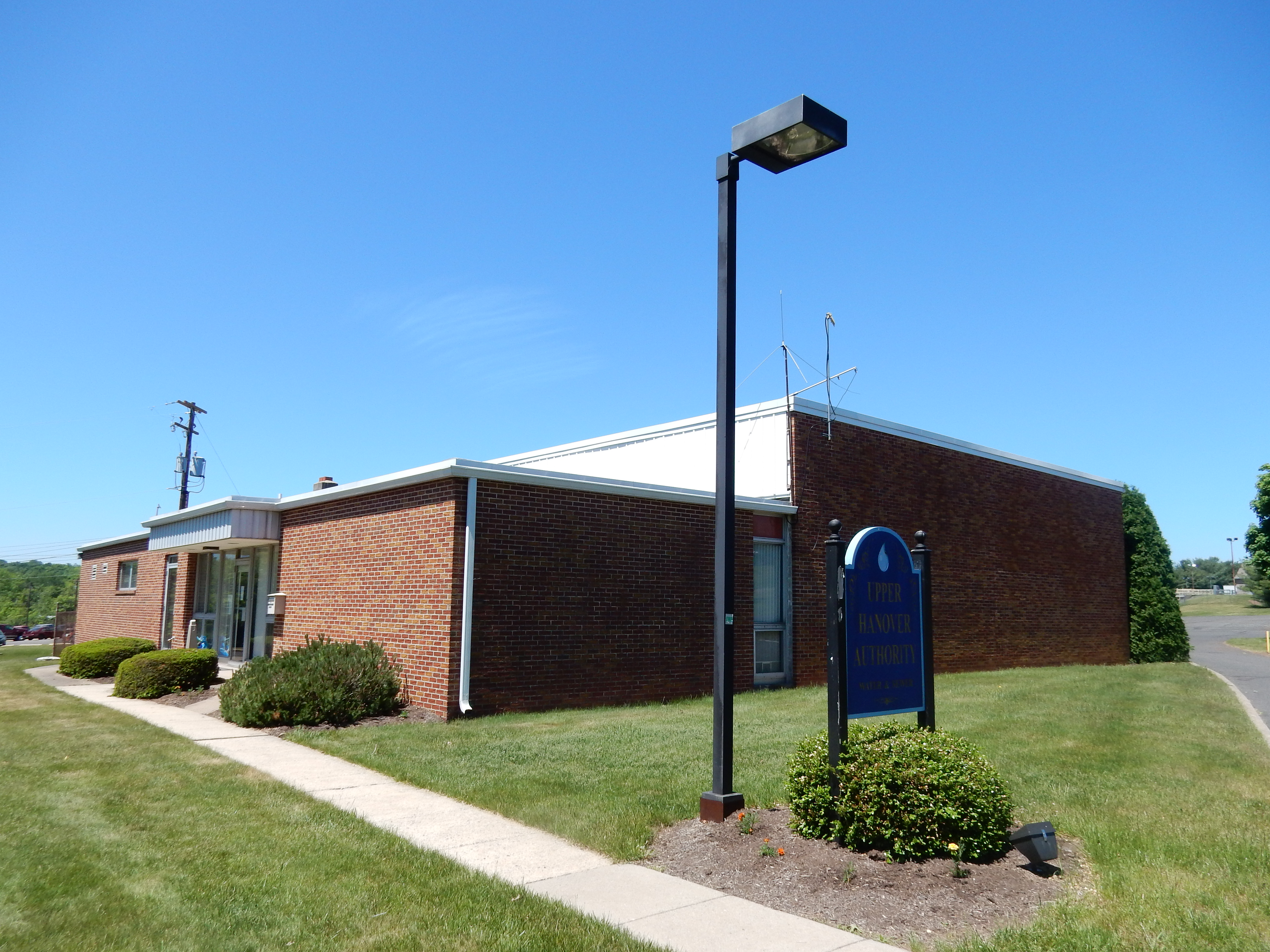
Upper Hanover Township Building just west of East Greenville.

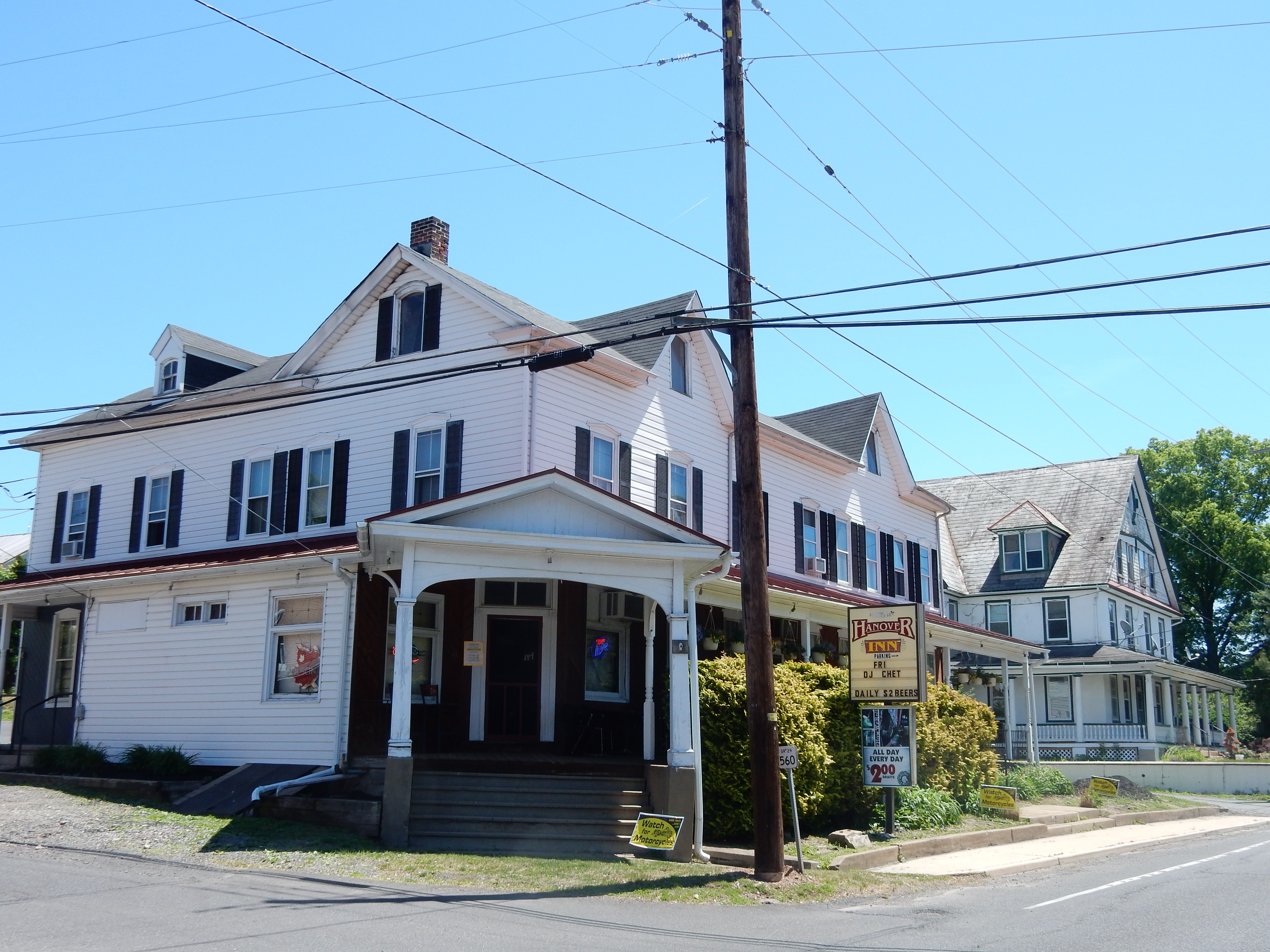
Hanover Inn. Palm.

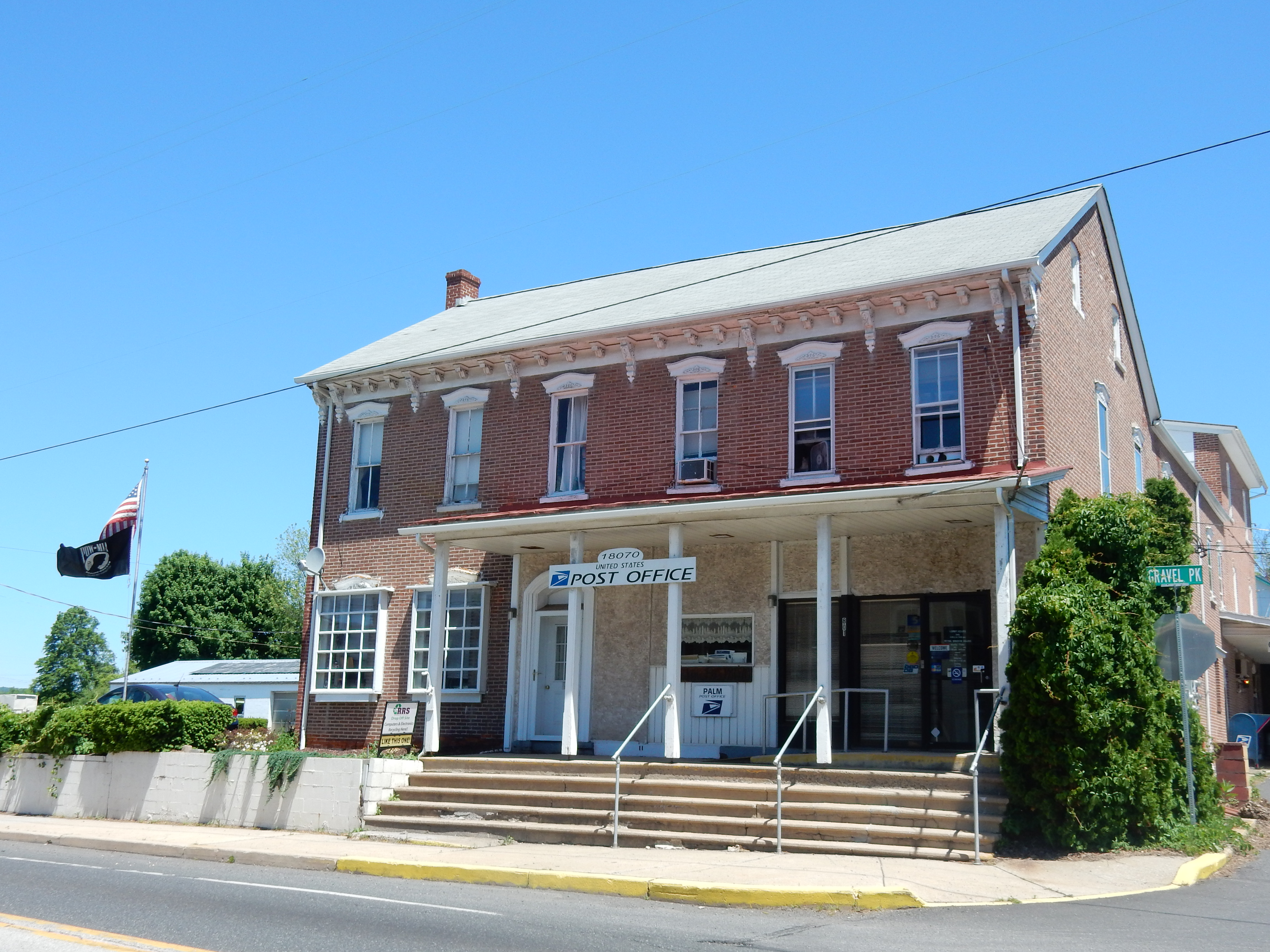
Post Office. Palm.

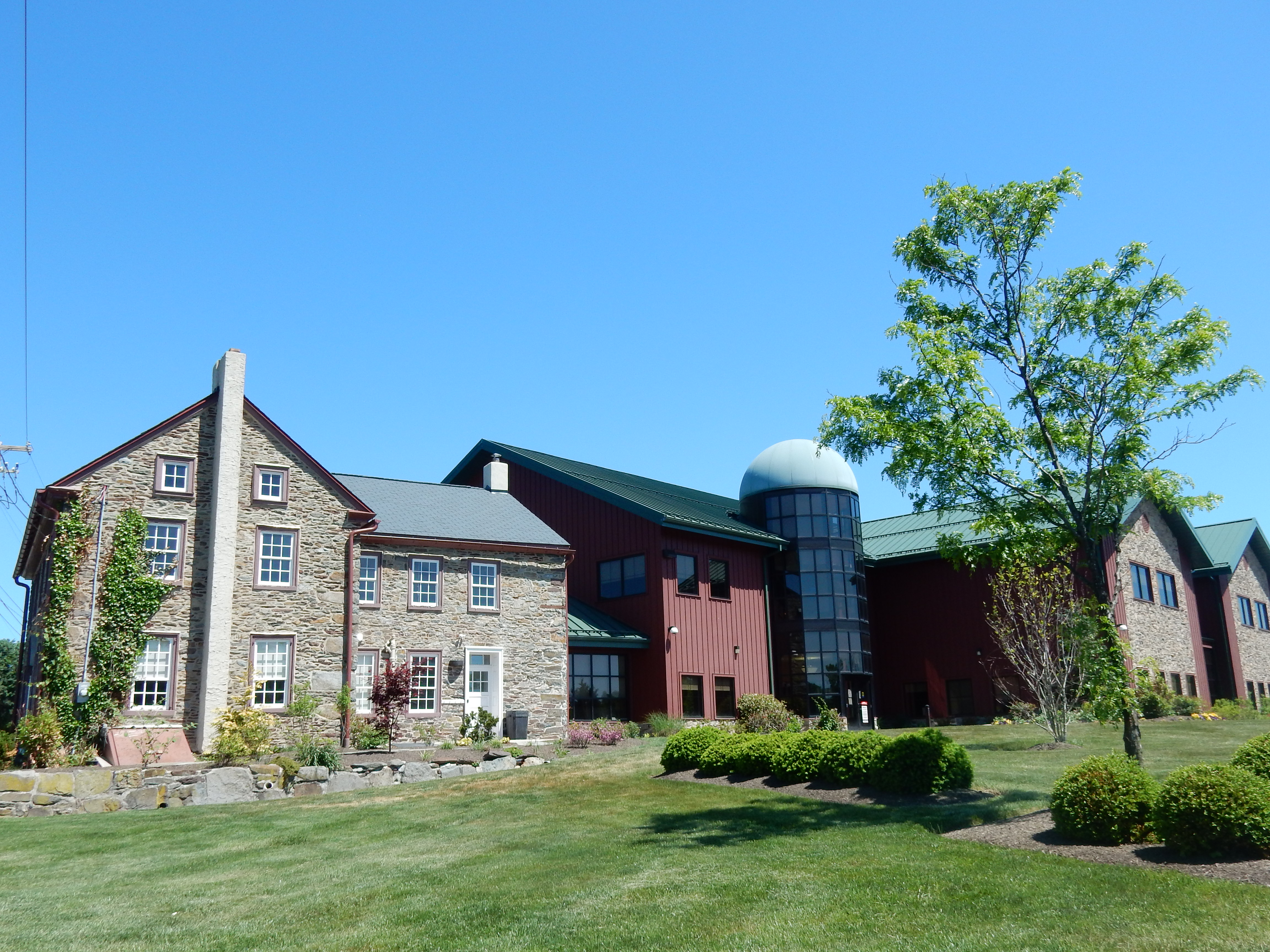
St. Luke's Hospital in the Montgomery portion of Geryville.

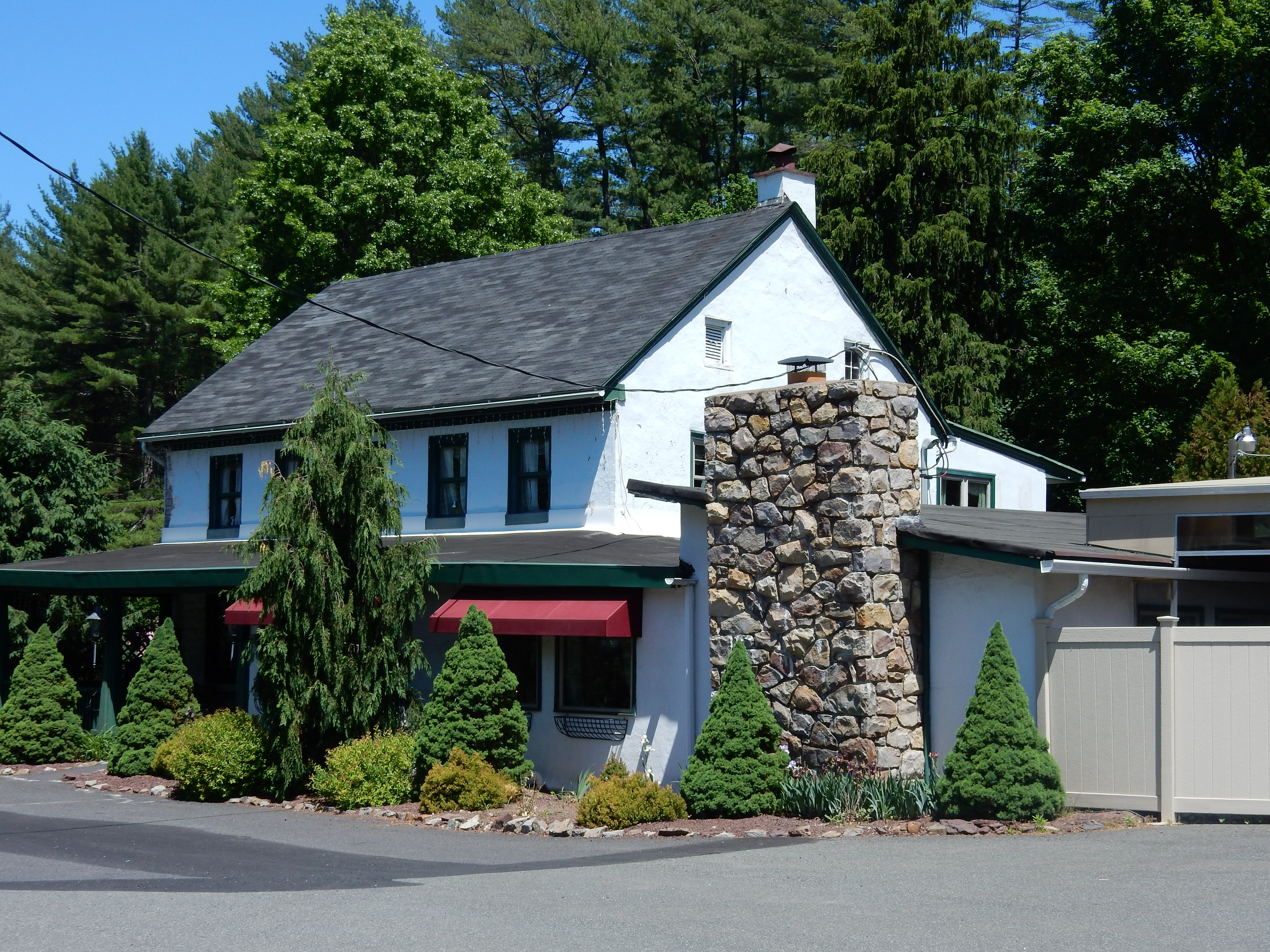
Farmhouse (ca. 1745).
