= Selina Schultz =

Selina Schultz Gerhard Schultz (16 Sep 1880 - 19 Jul 1969) was an important American scholar of the Schwenkfelder Church. She was born in Palm, Pennsylvania and died in Paoli, Pennsylvania. The uncommon repetition of the surname Schultz comes from her having received her mother's maiden name Schultz as a middle name, and then the identical married surname from her husband USDA potato scientist Eugene Schultz Schultz (1884–1969).

Schultz was first secretary and editor for the 19-volume Corpus Schwenckfeldianorum published between 1907 and 1961 in nineteen volumes, collecting in German, Latin, and English translation the works of the sixteenth-century radical reformer Caspar Schwenckfeld von Ossig. She also published widely on Schwenckfeld as a topic.

== Bibliography ==
- secretary and editor, Corpus Schwenckfeldianorum (Breitkopf & Härtel, Leipzig, 1907–1961) 19 volumes
- (contributor) Christopher Schultz (1718-1789) (Norristown: Board of Publication of the Schwenkfelder Church, 1940)
- (contributor) Early Schwenckfelder Ministers in Pennsylvania (Norristown: Board of Publication of the Schwenkfelder Church, 1941)
- Caspar Schwenckfeld von Ossig (1489-1561): Spiritual Interpreter of Christianity, Apostle of the Middle Way, Pioneer in Modern Religious Thought (1946)
- A Course of Study in the Life and Teachings of Caspar Schwenckfeld Von Ossig (1489–1561), and the History of the Schwenckfelder Religious Movement (1518–1964) (Board of Publication of the Schwenkfelder Church, 1964)
- Caspar Schwenckfeld von Ossig (1489–1561) (Pennsburg: Board of Publication of the Schwenkfelder Church, 1977)
