= Palm, Pennsylvania =

Unincorporated community in Pennsylvania, US

- Unincorporated community
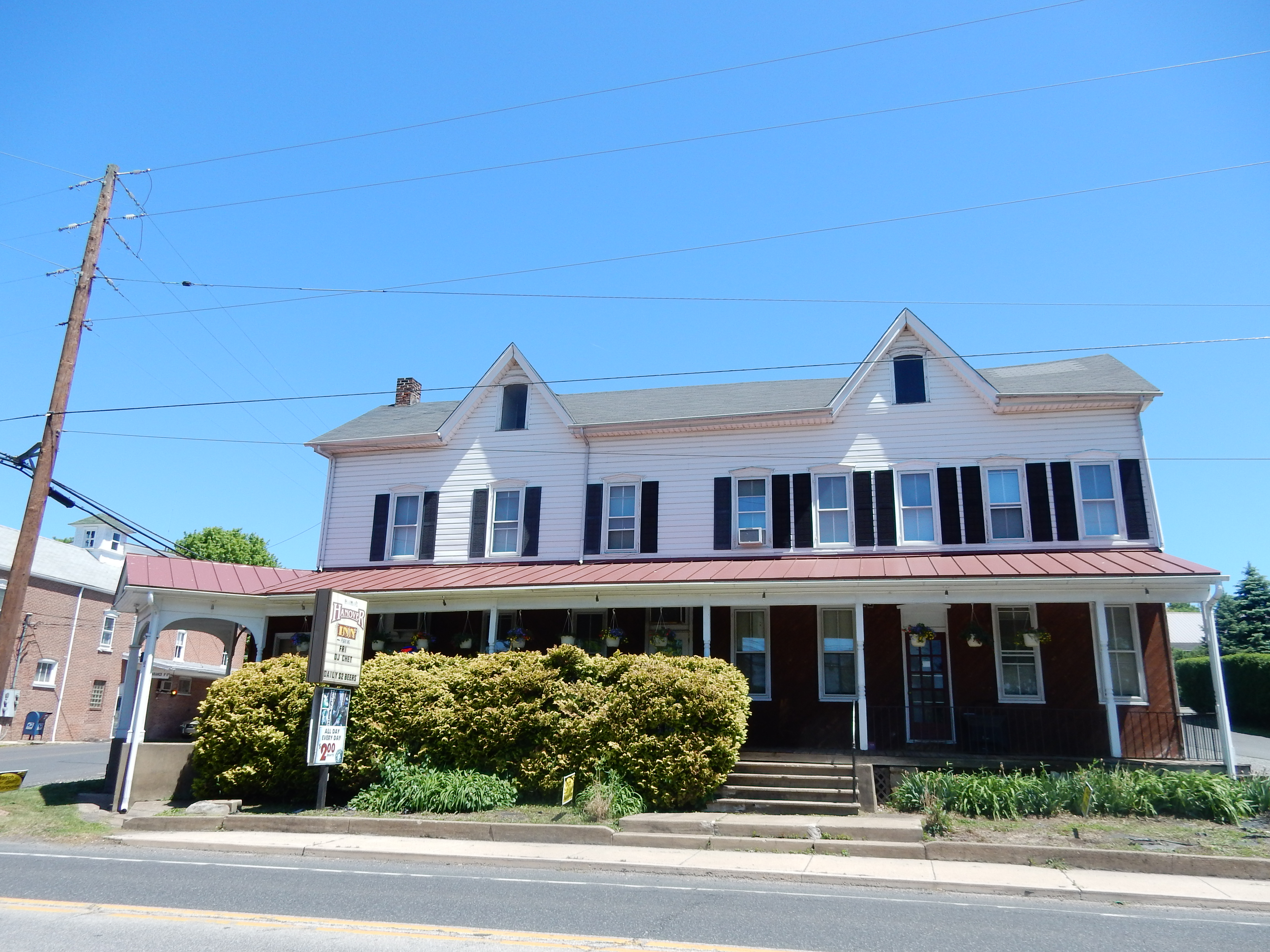
- Palm Tavern in Palm, Pennsylvania

- Location within Pennsylvania
- Coordinates: 40°25′41″N 75°31′59″W
- Country: United States
- State: Pennsylvania
- County: Montgomery
- Township: Upper Hanover
- Elevation: 367 ft (112 m)
- Time zone: UTC-5 (Eastern (EST))
  - Summer (DST): UTC-4 (EDT)
- ZIP Code: 18070
- Area codes: 215, 267, and 445
- GNIS feature ID: 1183219

Palm is an unincorporated community in Montgomery County, Pennsylvania, United States. It lies along Pennsylvania Route 29 between Hereford and East Greenville at latitude 40.4281539 longitude −75.5329608. It is located in Upper Hanover Township and the ZIP Code is 18070.

Hosensack Creek flows from the northeast into the Perkiomen Creek (which flows through Palm) and forms the natural southern boundary of the village. The area south of the Hosensack Creek is served by the East Greenville post office with the ZIP Code of 18041.

Palm is the site of one of the five remaining Schwenkfelder Churches in the United States, and it is the birthplace of science fiction writer, publisher, and minister Lloyd Arthur Eshbach. Schwenkfelder scholar Selina Schultz was also born in Palm.

== Gallery ==
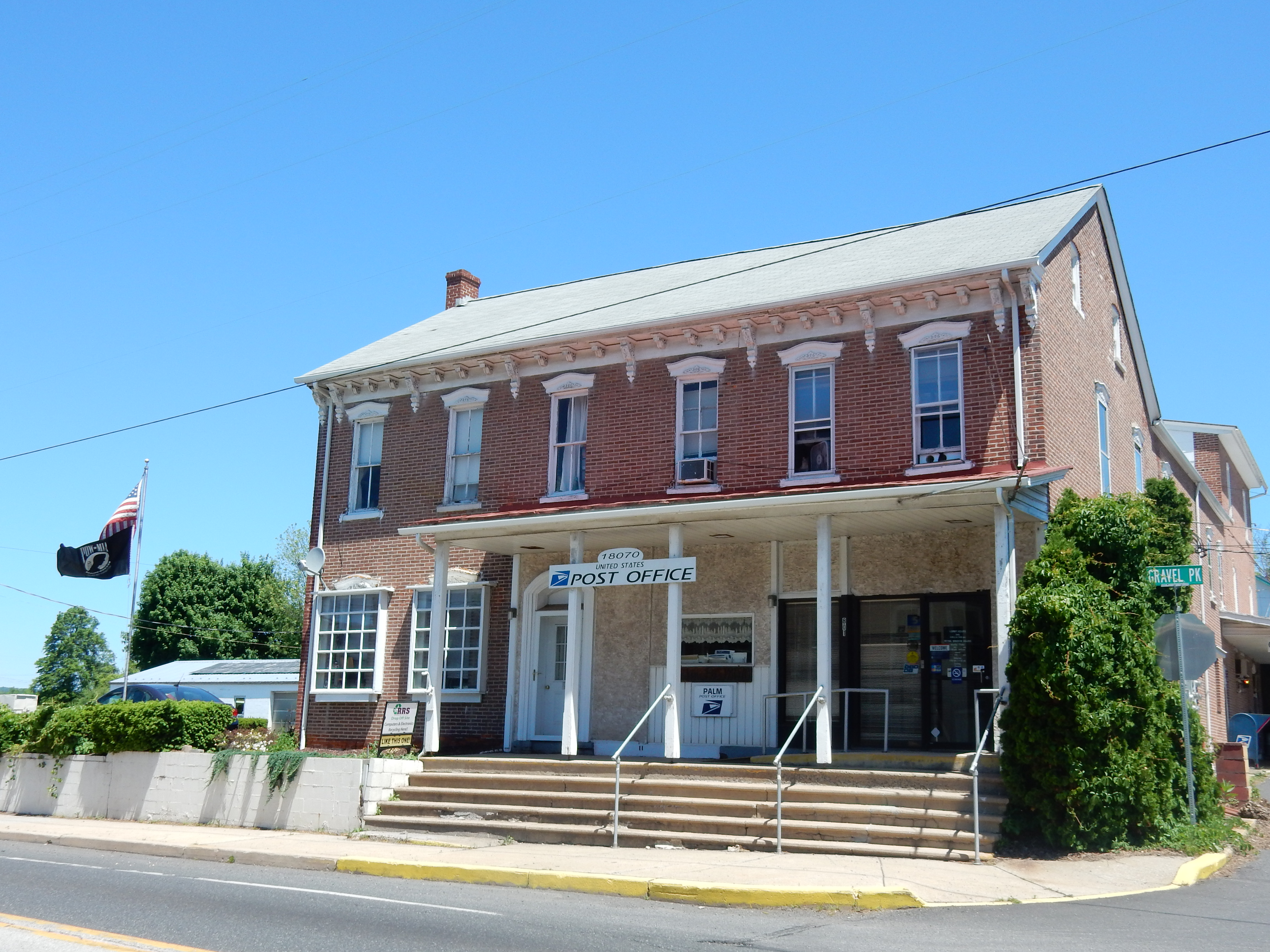
Palm Post Office

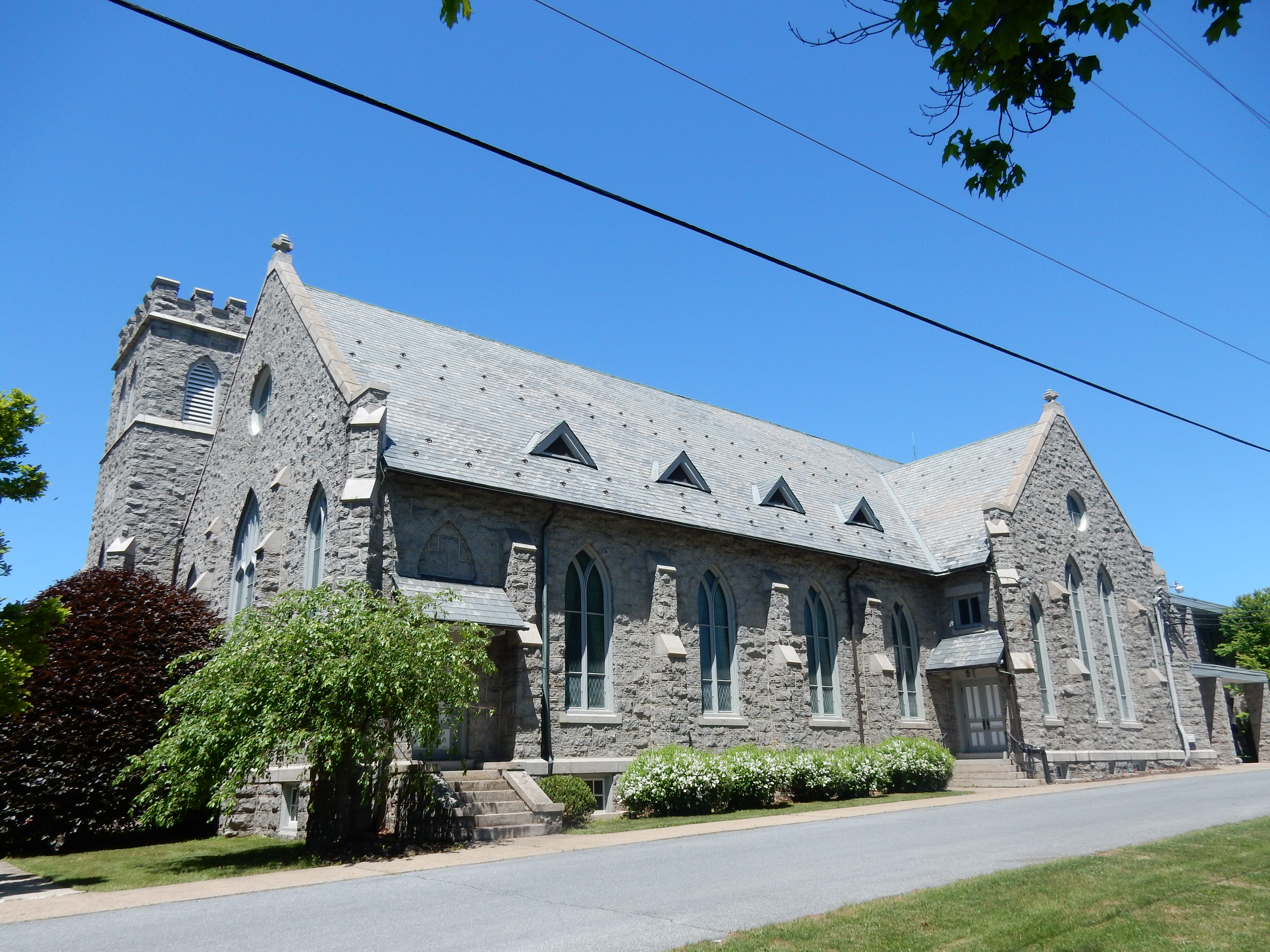
Palm Schwenkfelder Church

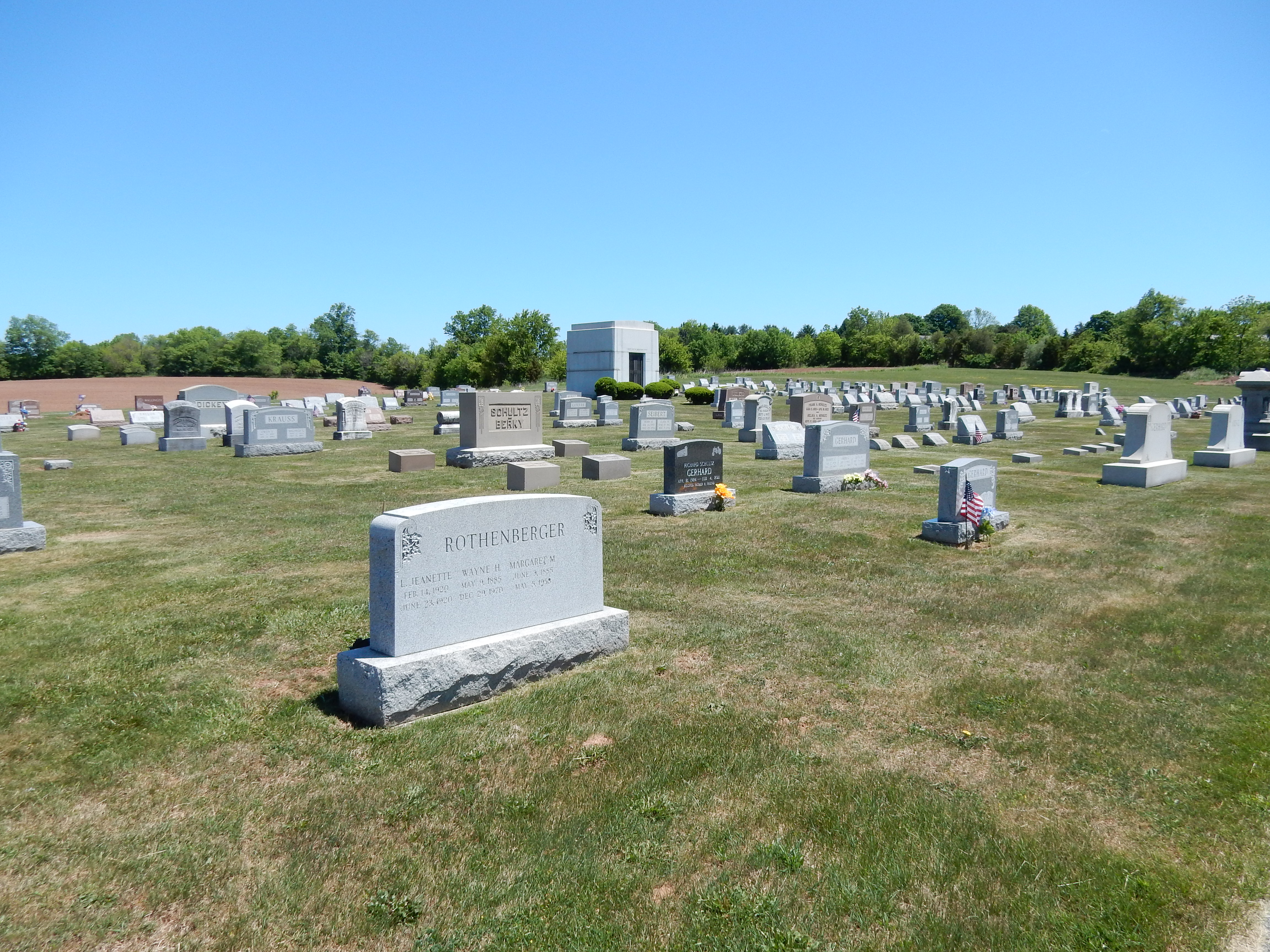
Palm Schwenkfelder Cemetery
