= Geryville, Pennsylvania =

Village in Pennsylvania, U.S.

Coordinates: 40°24′55″N 75°28′31″W

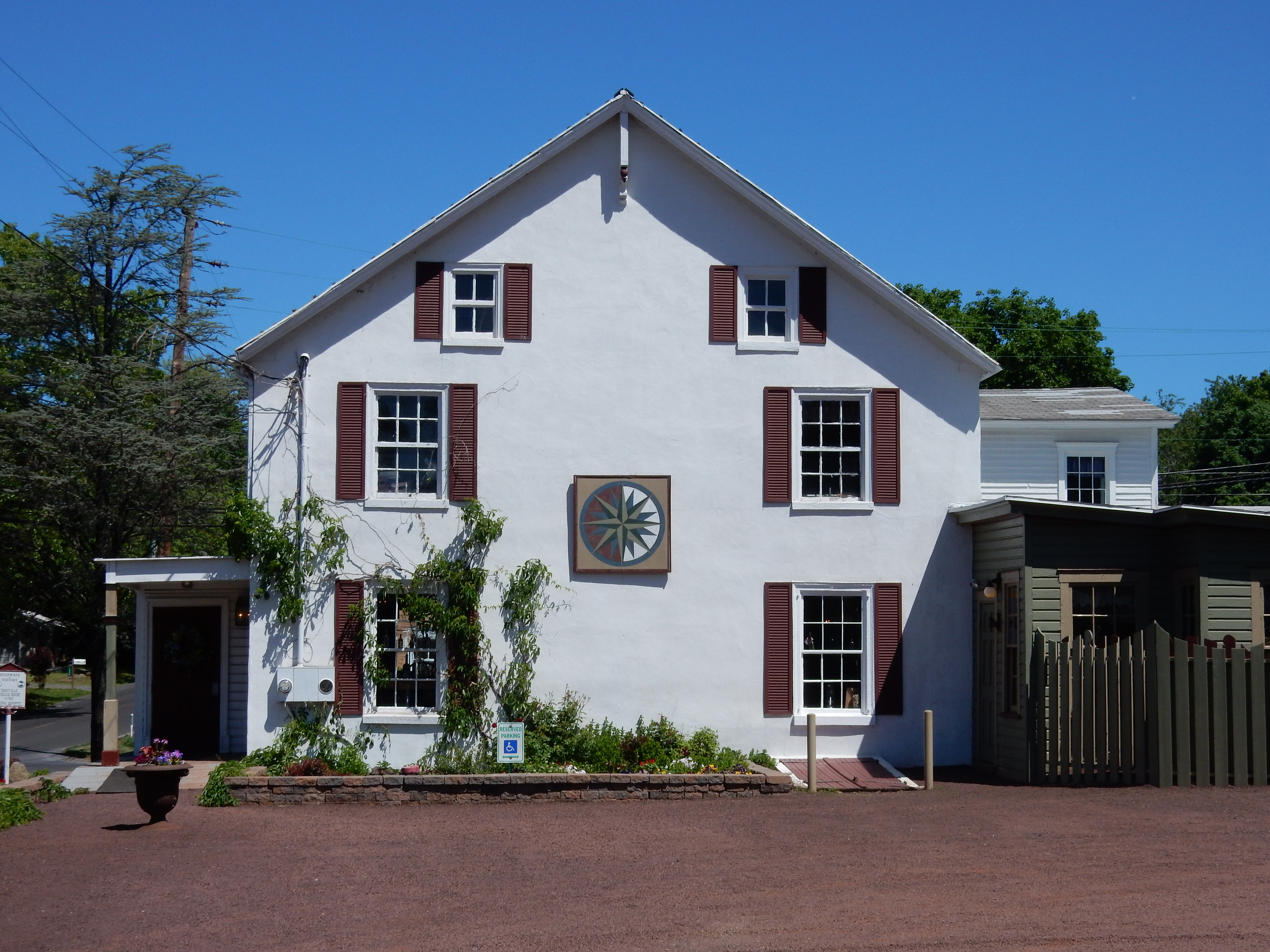
Jamison Publick House, c. 1745

Geryville is a village located mainly in Milford Township, Bucks County but also in Upper Hanover Township, Pennsylvania, United States. The first letter of the name is pronounced as a hard "g." It is located just north of Route 663 and is split between the East Greenville zip code of 18041 and the Pennsburg zip code of 18073. Originally known as Aurora, the village received its name from the postmaster Jesse Gery in 1865. The Publick House on the corner of Sleepy Hollow Road and Geryville Pike played a prominent role in Fries's Rebellion of 1799. It is drained via the Macoby Creek southward into the Perkiomen Creek and Schuylkill River.

== Gallery ==
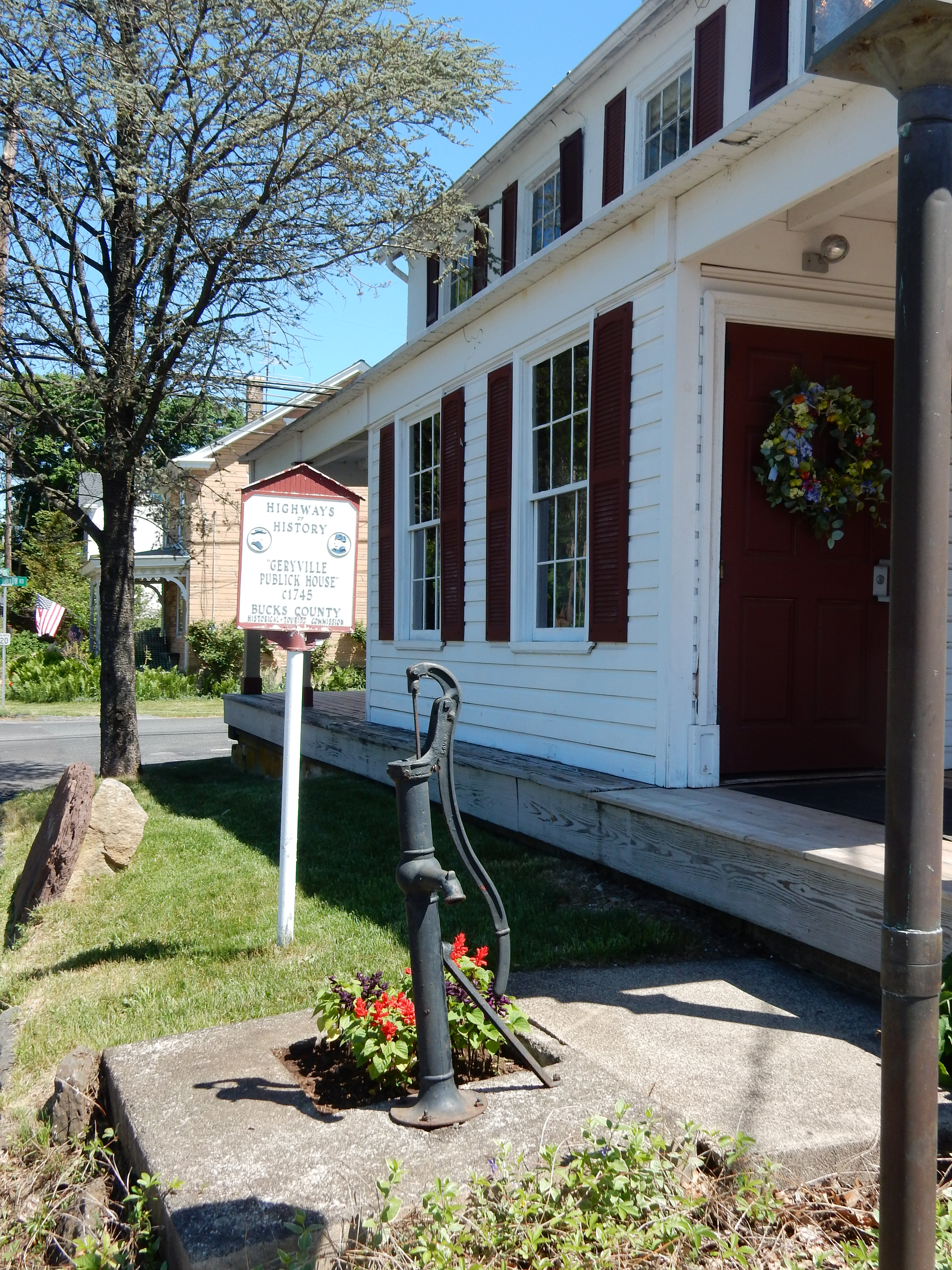
Jamison Publick House, front

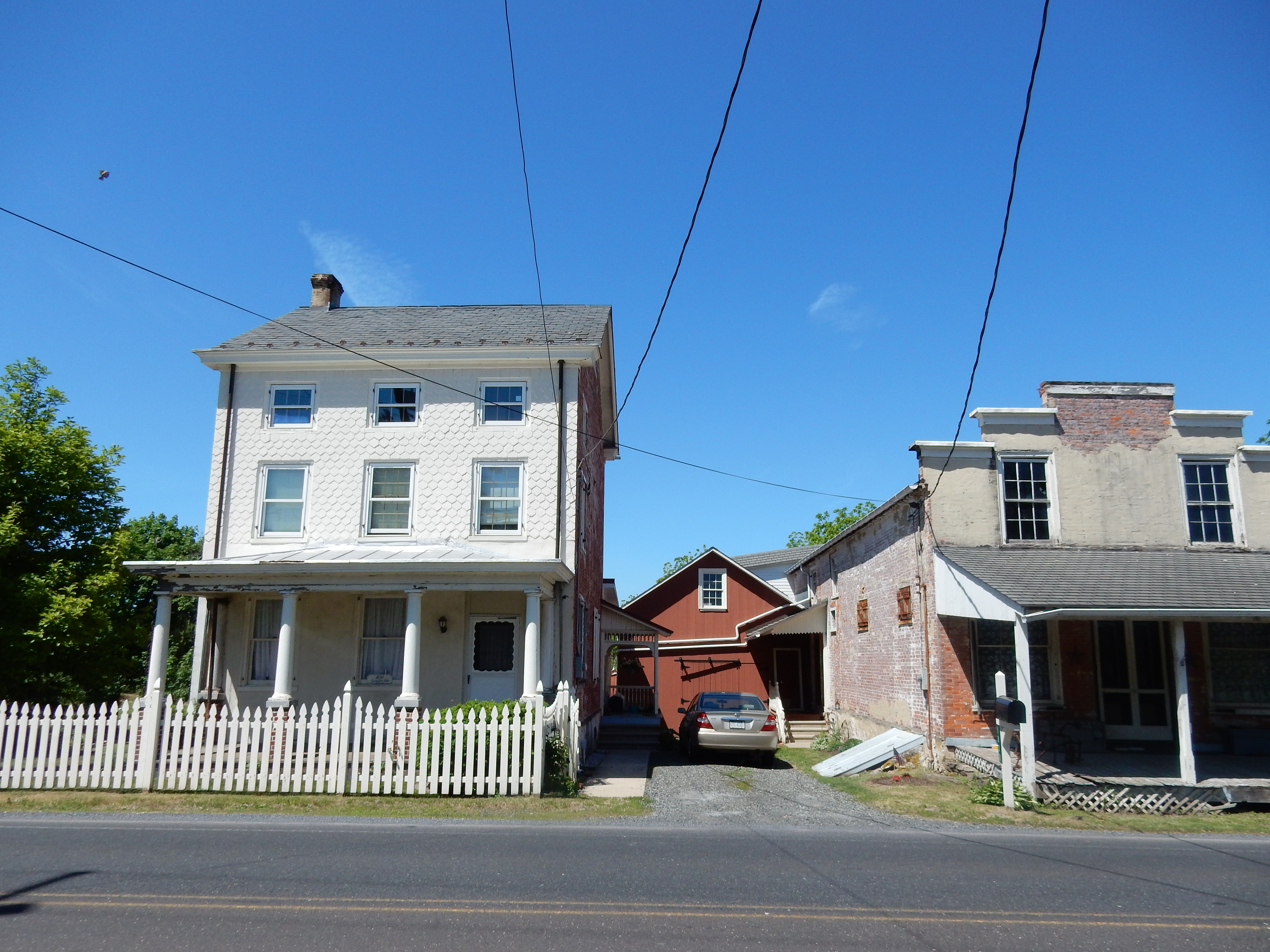
Geryville Pike in Geryville

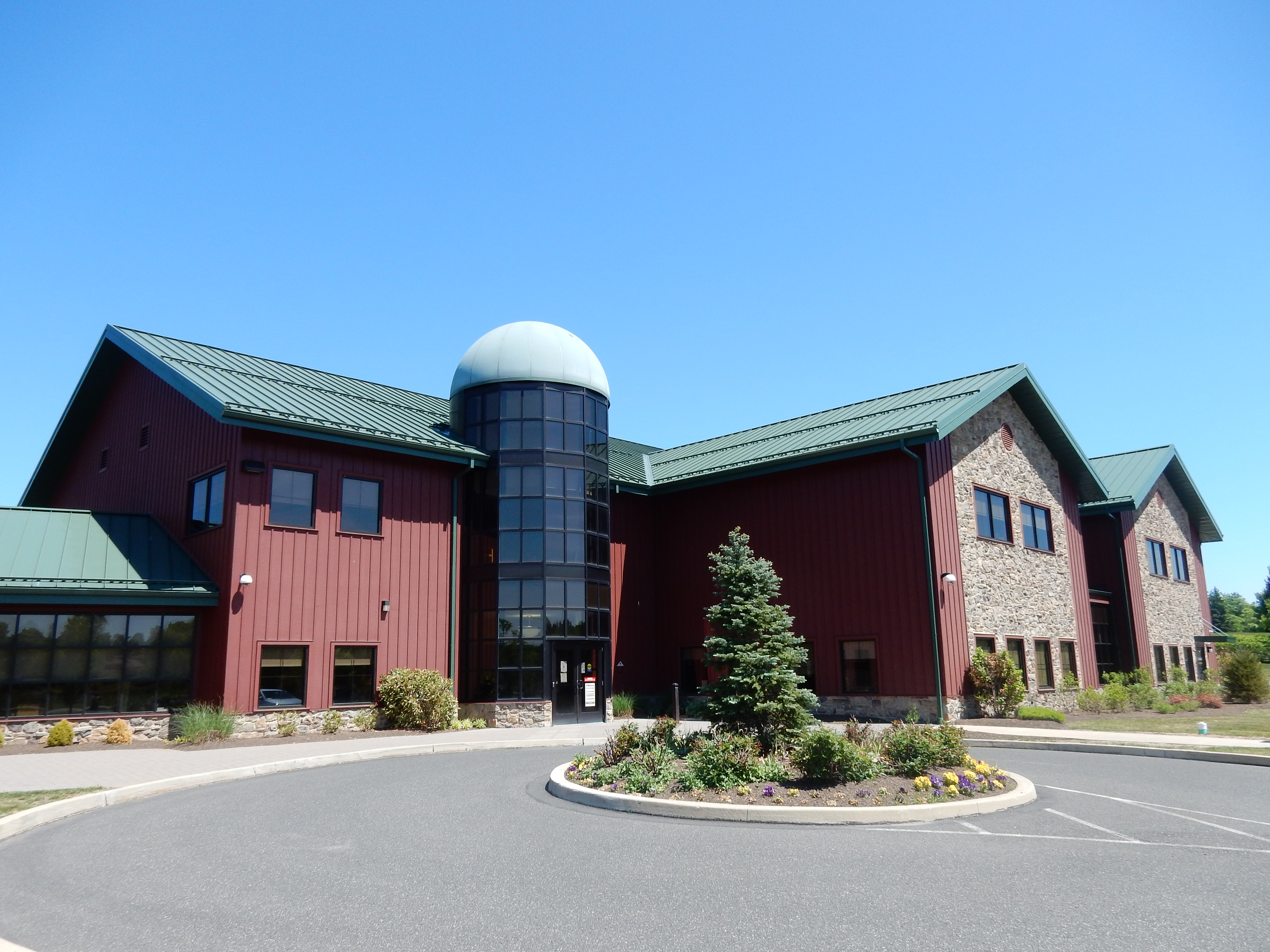
St Lukes Hospital

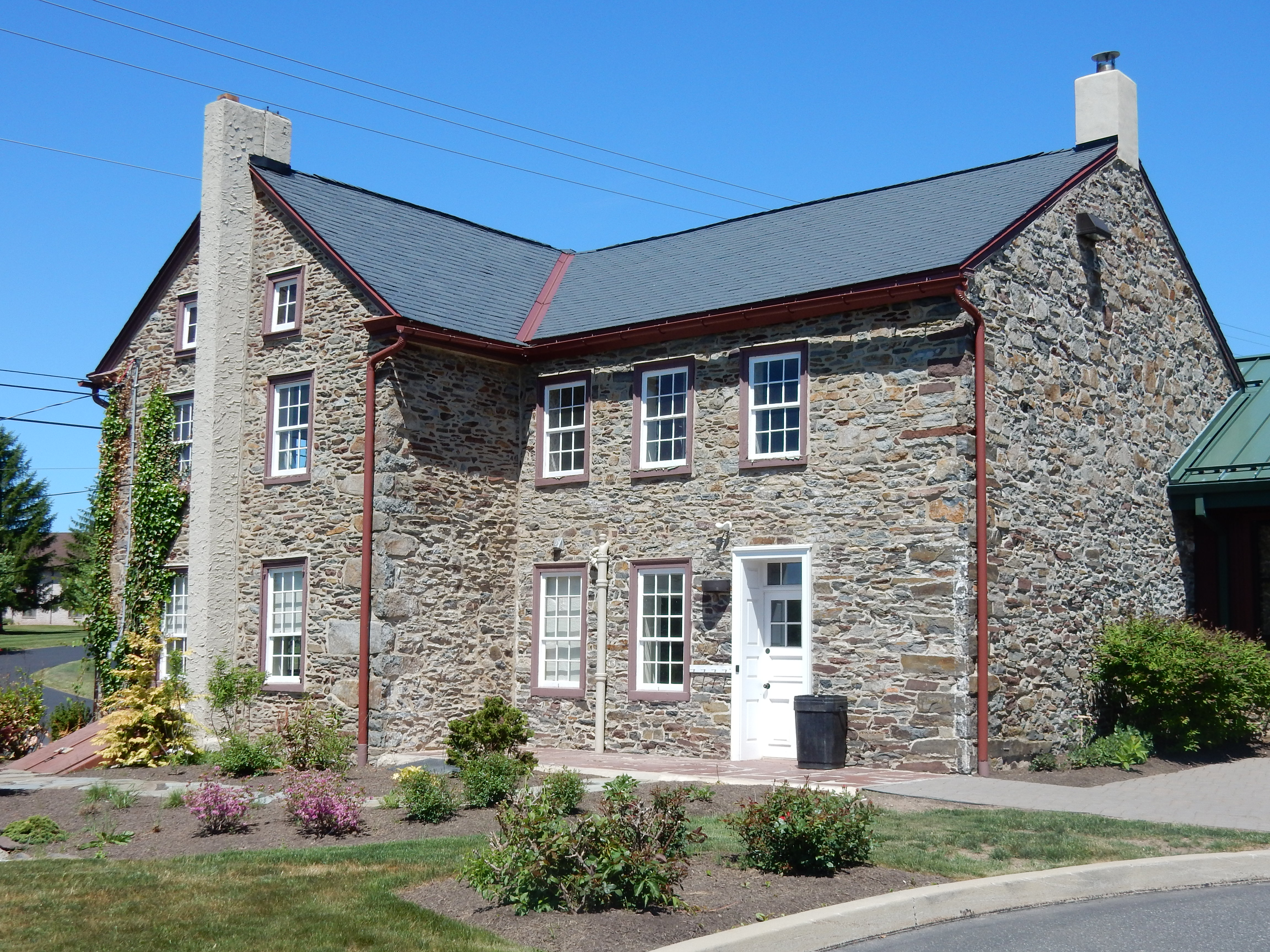
St Lukes Hospital, west wing
