= Pioneer Athletic Conference =

High school athletic conference in Pennsylvania, U.S.

The Pioneer Athletic Conference (PAC) is a high school athletic conference with 12 members. The conference' is affiliated with the Pennsylvania Interscholastic Athletic Association (PIAA) and all participating school districts are located within the southeastern quadrant of Pennsylvania. The PAC was founded in 1985 with eight members and was then known as the PAC-8.

== Current members ==
Liberty Division	Frontier Division
Boyertown Bears	Phoenixville Phantoms
Methacton Warriors	Pope John Paul II Golden Panthers
Norristown Eagles	Pottsgrove Falcons
Owen J. Roberts Wildcats	Pottstown Trojans
Perkiomen Valley Vikings	Upper Merion Vikings
Spring-Ford Rams	Upper Perkiomen Indians

== Past membership moves ==
=== 1985: founding members ===
The Pioneer Athletic Conference, then known as the PAC-8, was composed of the following charter members:

Founding Member	Former Conference/League
Lansdale Catholic	Bicentennial League
Perkiomen Valley	Bux-Mont League
Upper Perkiomen	Bux-Mont League
Phoenixville	Ches-Mont League
Pottsgrove	Ches-Mont League
Pottstown	Ches-Mont League
Spring-Ford	Ches-Mont League
St. Pius X	Ches-Mont League

=== 1988: Great Valley and Owen J. Roberts join ===
Great Valley and Owen J. Roberts join the Pioneer Athletic Conference and bring the total membership to ten.

=== 2002: Great Valley replaced by Boyertown ===
Great Valley left the PAC-10 to join the Southern Chester County League. In the same year, the PAC-10 admitted Boyertown which effectively kept the Pioneer Athletic League at 10-member status.

=== 2007: Lansdale Catholic moves to PCL, replaced by Methacton ===
On May 9, 2007, Lansdale Catholic administrators announced that they have accepted an invite to the Philadelphia Catholic League. The move is effective in July 2008. On July 3, 2007, Methacton School District was accepted into the PAC-10 after their application was approved by the principals of the existing PAC-10 member schools.

=== 2010: St. Pius X Merges with Kennedy-Kenrick, becomes Pope John Paul II ===
As of the end of the 2009–2010 school year, St. Pius X and Kennedy-Kenrick Catholic High School, formerly of the Philadelphia Catholic League, in Norristown merged to form a new high school named Pope John Paul II, located in Royersford. This school is already admitted to the PAC 10.

=== 2016: Norristown & Upper Merion join ===
Beginning in August 2016, the Norristown Eagles and Upper Merion Vikings joined the PAC to make it a 12-team conference. This marks the first expansion of the PAC since 1988.

On January 29, 2015, Norristown Area School District school board voted 9–0 to leave the Suburban One and join the PAC after months of discussion. Middle School sports will begin in September 2015 while the High School will join the league beginning with the 2016–17 school year.

On May 4, 2015, Upper Merion Area School District school board voted 8–1 to leave the Suburban One and join the PAC after many months of discussion. Middle School sports will begin in September 2015 while the High School will join the league beginning with the 2016–17 school year along with Norristown.
