= Phoenixville Area High School =

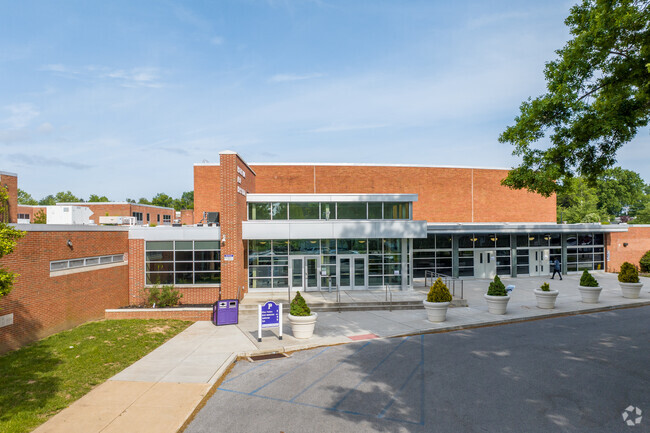

Location
- 1200 Gay Street; Phoenixville, Pennsylvania 19460; United States; 40°07′11″N 75°31′18″W

Information
- Type: Public
- Motto: "To prepare, inspire, and graduate students to meet the challenges of the future."
- Established: c, 1870
- School district: Phoenixville Area School District
- Principal: Rose Scioli
- Teaching staff: 85.40 (on FTE basis)
- Grades: 9 to 12
- Enrollment: 1,249 (2023-2024)
- Average class size: 23.5
- Student to teacher ratio: 14.63
- Schedule type: Period Scheduling
- Hours in school day: 6.083 Hours/Day
- Colors: Purple and White
- Slogan: Defenders of the purple and the white
- Fight song: Old Phoenix
- Athletics conference: PAC-10
- Sports: Football, Soccer, Field Hockey, Lacrosse, Basketball, Tennis, Track, Cross Country, Baseball, Volleyball, Softball, Swimming, Golf, Tennis
- Mascot: The Phantom
- Nickname: Phantoms
- Team name: Phoenixville Phantoms
- Website: School website

Phoenixville Area High School is a senior high school located on 1200 Gay St, Phoenixville, Pennsylvania. It is a member of the Phoenixville Area School District and teaches students from grades nine through twelve. As of the 2022-2023 School year there are 1272 members of the student body, and the principal is Rose Scioli (2021). The school's mascot is the Phantom, who has been the mascot since the 1960s. The Phantoms' colors are purple and white.

== Stats ==
Phoenixville Area High School, located in a large suburb, serves grades 9-12 and has a diverse student body with 34.5% minority enrollment, including 21.1% Hispanic, 6.1% Black, 3.9% Two or More Races, and 3.3% Asian students. 27% of students are economically disadvantaged. The school boasts a 91% graduation rate, slightly above the state median. Academically, it shows strengths in mathematics with 88% of students proficient, while reading and science proficiency rates are 69% and 56%, respectively.

Phoenixville Area High School offers Advanced Placement (AP) courses, with a 48% AP participation rate and a 36% pass rate. Nationally, it ranks #3,309, and within Pennsylvania, it ranks #133.

== Sports ==
The Phoenixville Area High School has been a member of the PAC-10 conference for 25 years. The other high schools within this conference are Boyertown, Pottstown, Methacton, Norristown, Pottsgrove, Pope John Paul II, Perkiomen Valley, Upper Perkiomen, Springford, Owen J. Roberts, and Upper Merion. A multitude of sports are offered such as boys and girls soccer, track, tennis, golf, lacrosse, cheerleading and swimming. For girls only sports, there is field hockey and softball and for boys there is football and wrestling. Notable Athletic alumni of the school includes individuals such as Mike Piazza, Andre Thornton, and Creighton Gubanich.

In January 2024, a complaint was filed with the U.S. Department of Education Office of Civil Rights for alleged athletics violations associated with federal Title IX law, based primarily on data filed by the Phoenixville Area School District with the Pennsylvania Department of Education. According to the data for the 2022–2023 school year, funding for some boys' teams exceeded that of girls' teams by significant amounts, including 33% more for boys' basketball compared to girls' basketball, 30% more for boys' soccer than girls' soccer, and 27% more for boys' baseball than girls' softball. In addition, boys' athletic team roster spots exceeded that of girls' athletic team roster spots by 125, when accounting for overall student population gender mix.

== Senior Project ==
In order to graduate from any school in Pennsylvania a 'graduation project' must be completed. For Phoenixville High School this project consists of completing a fifteen-hour community service project as well as writing updates reporting progress along the way. Each project must have a project adviser that the student chooses to sign off that the project was completed. The most common projects are typically coaching sports teams. Once the project is completed a paper must be written outlining the entire project and a five-minute presentation done in meetings at the end of the student's senior year in front of two faculty members.

== Music ==
The Phoenixville Area High School offers a multitude of opportunities when it comes to music. Classes such as choir, symphonic band, and wind ensemble are offered during the school day. Anyone can be in choir or symphonic band but they must go through an audition process to be accepted into the wind ensemble, jazz band, or vocal ensemble. The marching band, jazz band, and vocal ensemble are considered extracurricular activities, having meetings outside of the regular school day.

== F.O.C.U.S. ==
"For Our Children's Uncompromised Safety Post Prom Parent Organization" Project F.O.C.U.S. is a parent run organization to ensure their children's safety after prom. They do this starting in September every year by meeting and brainstorming a theme for that year's post prom celebration at the Phoenixville Area High School. The program works hard meeting once a month until the month of prom to get activities, food, and shows together to entertain the students. They get donations from local businesses and churches to help cover the expenses. For an example, in the year 2010 the F.O.C.U.S. theme was "An Evening in the Orient". With this theme, the entire inside of the high school was decorated to look like an oriental town complete with lanterns and a sushi bar. There are no students involved in this program, the only information students know is the theme before they enter. As of the 2023–2024 school year, F.O.C.U.S. is no longer in operation due to low attendance and volunteer help.

== Clubs ==
There are many clubs offered at the Phoenixville Area High School. Some are nationally run such as Future Business Leaders of America (FBLA), National Honor Society (NHS), Key Club, and Modern Music Masters (Tri-M). There are also student originated clubs such as Green Club, Dungeons and Dragons Club, Art Club, Latin Club, Engineering club, Science Club, Model United Nations Club, and Varsity Club. Out of all of the clubs listed there are only prerequisites that must be met for admittance to NHS, Tri-M, and Varsity Club. The majority of the clubs at Phoenixville High School are sustained financially by themselves. The most common types of fundraising for clubs are bake sales and dances. If a club needs a substantial amount of money they can request donations from the Phoenixville Community Education Foundation, an organization instated to help cover funding that was cut by the Phoenixville School District.

== Phantoms ==
The school's mascot, The Phantom, came as a result of a 1934 football match between Lower Merion and Phoenixville. Both teams were very good, although Lower Merion was regarded as the better of the two. After Phoenixville soundly defeated Lower Merion, a sportswriter for a Philadelphia newspaper wrote that "Phoenixville ran through their (Lower Merion's) lines like a bunch of Phantoms." This nickname stuck, and eventually became the team's official name.

== Notable alumni ==
- Creighton Gubanich, former Major League Baseball player with Boston Red Sox.
- Rich Kraynak, linebacker for the Philadelphia Eagles.
- Rob Lohr, gridiron football player
- Kevin Negandhi, ESPN Anchor.
- Neal Olkewicz, linebacker for the Washington Redskins.
- Mike Piazza, former catcher and designated hitter for Major League Baseball.
- John Stauffer, Pennsylvania State Representative and State Senator
- André Thornton, former Major League Baseball player.
- David White, actor.
