= John Sodaski =

American football player (born 1948)

No. 49, 96, 52
- Position: Linebacker

Personal information
- Born: January 14, 1948 (age 78); Phoenixville, Pennsylvania, U.S.
- Listed height: 6 ft 2 in (1.88 m)
- Listed weight: 222 lb (101 kg)

Career information
- High school: Saint Pius X (Lower Pottsgrove Township, Pennsylvania)
- College: Villanova (1965-1968)
- NFL draft: 1969: 9th round, 212th overall pick

Career history
- Pittsburgh Steelers (1969–1970); Philadelphia Eagles (1972–1973); Denver Broncos (1974)*; Philadelphia Bell (1974)
- * Offseason or practice squad member only

Career NFL statistics
- Interceptions: 1
- Fumble recoveries: 2
- Sacks: 1
- Stats at Pro Football Reference

John Sodaski (born January 14, 1948) is an American former professional football player who was a linebacker in the National Football League (NFL). He played for the Pittsburgh Steelers in 1971 and for the Philadelphia Eagles from 1972 to 1973. He played college football for the Villanova Wildcats.
