= Union Sunday School =

Union Sunday School, or variants thereof, can refer to:

- Union Sunday School (Clermont, Iowa), listed on the National Register of Historic Places in Iowa
- Sanatoga Union Sunday School, listed on the National Register of Historic Places in Pennsylvania
