= William Bradfield =

William Bradfield may refer to:

- William Bradfield (1933–1998), American teacher convicted of conspiracy to commit murder; see Jay C. Smith
- William A. Bradfield (1927–2014), Australian comet hunter
