= Bishop McDevitt High School =

Bishop McDevitt High School may refer to:

- Bishop McDevitt High School (Harrisburg, Pennsylvania), United States
- Bishop McDevitt High School (Wyncote, Pennsylvania), United States
