= Rahsul Faison =

American football player (born 2000)

No. 1
- Position: Running back

Personal information
- Born: February 20, 2000 (age 26)
- Listed height: 5 ft 11 in (1.80 m)
- Listed weight: 208 lb (94 kg)

Career information
- High school: Pottsgrove (Pottsgrove, Pennsylvania); Salisbury School (Salisbury, Connecticut)
- College: Marshall (2019); Lackawanna (2020); Snow (2021–2022); Utah State (2023–2024); South Carolina (2025)
- NFL draft: 2026: undrafted

Awards and highlights
- Second-team All-Mountain West (2024)
- Stats at ESPN

Rahsul Faison (born February 20, 2000) is an American football running back. He played college football for the Snow College Badgers, Utah State Aggies, and South Carolina Gamecocks.

== Career ==
Faison attended Pottsgrove High School in Pottsgrove, Pennsylvania. As a senior, he rushed for 2,938 yards and 42 touchdowns. He committed to play college football at Stony Brook University. However, Faison enrolled at the Salisbury School in Salisbury, Connecticut.

Faison began his collegiate career with Marshall, taking a greyshirt in 2019. He took online classes at Lackawanna College in 2020, before earning his first playing time at Snow College. In 2022 with Snow, Faison rushed for 355 yards and six touchdowns. Following the 2022 season, he transferred to Utah State University, where he gained immediate playing time. With Utah State in 2023, he recorded 118 carries for 736 yards and five touchdowns. The following season, Faison rushed for 1,109 yards and eight touchdowns, before entering the transfer portal.

On January 7, 2025, Faison transferred to the University of South Carolina to play for the South Carolina Gamecocks. On August 25, the NCAA approved his eligibility waiver, granting him one more season of college football eligibility.

=== Statistics ===
Year	Team	Games	Rushing				Receiving			
Year	Team	GP	Att	Yds	Avg	TD	Rec	Yds	Avg	TD
2019	Marshall	Greyshirted								
2020	Lackawanna	DNP								
2021	Snow	DNP								
2022	Snow	9	88	355	4.0	6	–	–	–	–
2023	Utah State	13	118	736	6.2	5	11	52	4.7	0
2024	Utah State	12	198	1,109	5.6	8	22	99	4.5	0
2025	South Carolina	12	96	470	4.9	3	19	118	6.2	0
NJCAA Career		9	88	355	4.0	6	–	–	–	–
NCAA Career		37	412	2315	5.6	16	52	269	5.2	0

== Professional career ==
Pre-draft measurables
Height	Weight	Arm length	Hand span	Wingspan	40-yard dash	10-yard split	20-yard split	20-yard shuttle	Vertical jump	Broad jump	Bench press
5 ft 11 in (1.80 m)	208 lb (94 kg)	30 7/8 in (0.78 m)	9 in (0.23 m)	6 ft 4 1/2 in (1.94 m)	4.62 s	1.59 s	2.69 s	4.26 s	37.5 in (0.95 m)	10 ft 2 in (3.10 m)	14 reps
All values from NFL Combine/Pro Day

In April 2026, Faison received rookie mini-camp invites from the Kansas City Chiefs, Tennessee Titans, and New Orleans Saints.

== Personal life ==
Faison's cousin, Rian Wallace, spent three years in the NFL and won Super Bowl XL with the Pittsburgh Steelers.
