= Pam Rosanio =

American basketball player

Personal information
- Born: October 16, 1986 (age 40) Southampton, Pennsylvania
- Listed height: 5 ft 10 in (1.78 m)

Career information
- High school: Archbishop Wood (Warminster, Pennsylvania)
- College: UMass (2004–2008)
- Playing career: 2008–2017
- Position: Guard / Forward
- Number: 12

Career history
- 2008: Ribera Italy
- 2008–2009: Eskilstuna Sweden
- 2009–2010: Umeå Sweden

Career highlights
- First-team All-Atlantic 10 (2008; Second-team All-Atlantic 10 (2006); Atlantic 10 All-Rookie team (2005)

Pam Rosanio (born October 16, 1986) is an American basketball player who played at Archbishop Wood High School (2000-2004), University of Massachusetts, Amherst (2004-2008), and internationally for 10 seasons; Italy, Sweden and Spain.

== Early life and college career ==
Rosanio attended Archbishop Wood High School in Warminster, Pennsylvania, where she held the all-time school record (1,417) for both boys and girls for 17 years. The Philadelphia Catholic League's MVP (‘04) and 1st team All Catholic (‘03, ‘02). Rosanio had her #12 jersey retired in 2005 and was inducted into Archbishop Wood's Hall of Fame in 2019.

At UMass (2004–2008), Rosanio made an immediate impact starting all but one game and finished the season earning A-10 All-Rookie honors (2005). In 2006, she was named to the Preseason A-10 Second-Team All-Conference and in 2008 earned All-Atlantic 10 Honorable Mention. Over her career, she amassed 1,466 points (15.9 points per game), 514 rebounds per game (4.4 per game), and delivered a total of 306 assists. She became one of UMass' all-time leaders in games started with a total of 115/116 career starts and minutes played 3,896.

=== Massachusetts statistics ===
Ratios
Year	Team	GP	FG%	3P%	FT%	RBG	APG	BPG	SPG	PPG
2004-05	Massachusetts	29	38.7%	27.8%	64.4%	3.07	2.07	0.28	1.17	10.86
2005-06	Massachusetts	28	40.3%	28.4%	76.4%	4.36	2.68	0.11	0.93	12.50
2006-07	Massachusetts	29	43.8%	27.5%	65.7%	5.35	2.55	0.14	1.17	11.14
2007-08	Massachusetts	30	48.9%	34.0%	77.1%	4.93	3.23	0.17	1.20	15.93
Career		116	43.2%	28.9%	71.8%	4.43	2.64	0.17	1.12	12.64

Totals
Year	Team	GP	FG	FGA	3P	3PA	FT	FTA	REB	A	BK	ST	PTS
2004-05	Massachusetts	29	109	282	32	115	65	101	89	60	8	34	315
2005-06	Massachusetts	28	116	288	21	74	97	127	122	75	3	26	350
2006-07	Massachusetts	29	116	265	22	80	69	105	155	74	4	34	323
2007-08	Massachusetts	30	171	350	18	53	118	153	148	97	5	36	478
Career		116	512	1185	93	322	349	486	514	306	20	130	1466

== International career ==
2008-2009: Ribera (Italy) / Eskilstuna Basket (Sweden): 18.0ppg, 5.3rpg, 1.3apg, 1.4spg, 2FGP: 42.9%, 3PT: 26.9%, FT: 71.8%

2009-2010: Umea Comets (Sweden): 22.9ppg, 6.9rpg, 1.9apg, 2.4spg, 2FGP: 45.7%, 3PT: 26.1%, FT: 71.9%

2010-2011: Umea Comets (Sweden): 26.0ppg, 7.9rpg, 1.6apg, 1.6spg, FGP: 45.8%, 3PT: 33.8%, FT: 83.3%

2011-2012: Solna Vikings (Sweden): 12.4ppg, 4.2rpg, 1.7apg, 1.8spg, FGP: 38.5%, 3PT: 25.8%, FT: 81.3%

2012-2013: C.U.S. Chieti (Italy): 3.3ppg/ Udominate Basket Umea (Sweden): 18.1ppg, 4.6rpg, 2.8apg, 1.3spg, FGP: 50.6%, 3PT: 32.1%, FT: 73.5%

2013-2014: Udominate Basket Umea (Sweden): Baltic Women’s Basket League: (4th)14.9ppg, 4.3rpg, 1.7apg, 1.8spg, FGP-3(62.1%), 3PT: 21.2%, FT: 87.5%; Swedish Damligan: 11.8ppg, 3.1rpg, 1.7apg, FGP: 48.2%, 3PT: 34.9%, FT: 73.4%

2014-2015: Udominate Basket Umea (Sweden): EuroCup: 18.5ppg, 4.5rpg, 1.3apg, 1.3spg, FGP: 46.3%, 3PT: 35.3%, FT: 94.7% Swedish Damligan: Score-2(17.3ppg), 3.4rpg, 1.9apg, 1.8spg, FGP: 50.7%, 3PT-1(50.5%), FT: 81.1%; Italian National Team

2016-2017: C.B. AL-QÁZERES EXTREMADURA (Spain): 13ppg (FGP 46.6%) (3PT 37%), 3.2 rpg, 1.9 apg, FT 82%
