= Brad Scioli =

American football player (born 1976)

No. 99
- Position: Defensive end / Defensive tackle

Personal information
- Born: September 6, 1976 (age 50); Bridgeport, Pennsylvania, U.S.
- Listed height: 6 ft 3 in (1.91 m)
- Listed weight: 277 lb (126 kg)

Career information
- High school: King of Prussia (PA) Upper Merion
- College: Penn State
- NFL draft: 1999: 5th round, 138th overall pick

Career history
- Indianapolis Colts (1999–2004)

Awards and highlights
- First-team All-Big Ten (1998); Defensive player of the game 1999 Hula Bowl
- Stats at Pro Football Reference

Brad Elliott Scioli (born September 6, 1976) is an American former professional football defensive end for the Indianapolis Colts of the National Football League (NFL).

== College career ==
Scioli attended Penn State University, playing defensive end for coach Joe Paterno. Following a senior campaign in 1998, during which he recorded ten sacks, he was named the outstanding senior member of the Penn State team. Scioli was also named defensive player of the game at the 1999 Hula Bowl college all-star game. Scioli spent a season playing tight end while in college.

Scioli earned a bachelor's degree in Hotel, Restaurant and Institutional Management from Penn State.

== Professional career ==
Scioli was selected as the 138th overall pick by the Indianapolis Colts in the fifth round of the 1999 NFL draft and played for the team from 1999 to 2006. He recorded 15 sacks in his six-year career, with a high of seven sacks in 2002. He was drafted with a fifth-round draft selection acquired from St. Louis for the Colts' star running back Marshall Faulk (also included in the deal was a second-round pick used on LB Mike Peterson). Scioli retired in 2004 due to injuries.

== Personal life ==
After retiring from football with a shoulder injury, Scioli went back to school at West Chester University, where he earned his certification to teach. He then got a master's degree in education development & strategies at Wilkes University. Scioli then moved back to his home town of Bridgeport, Pennsylvania, which is in the Upper Merion Area School District. Following his move, in 2007 he began teaching health and physical education at Upper Merion Area High School. Scioli is married and has two daughters.

== Lawsuit against the NFL ==
In December 2011, Scioli was part of a group of 11 other professional players who filed a lawsuit against the NFL. The players and their attorneys alleged that the League failed to properly treat head injuries in spite of prevailing medical evidence and the prevalent use of Toradol administered by the team to the players as a pain-masking agent, leading the players to develop effects of brain injury.
