= Harold Zimmerman =

American football and basketball coach

Biographical details
- Born: 1891; Pennsylvania, U.S.
- Died: December 5, 1967 (aged 76); Pennsylvania, U.S.

Coaching career (HC unless noted)

Football
- 1912–1913: Millersville
- 1919–1922: Norristown HS (PA)
- 1923–1924: Ursinus

Basketball
- 1912–1914: Millersville
- 1923–1925: Ursinus

Head coaching record
- Overall: 13–20–1 (college football); 23–19 (college basketball)

Harold I. Zimmerman (1891 – December 5, 1967) was an American football and basketball coach. He served as the head football coach (1912–1913) and head basketball coach (1912–1914) at Millersville University of Pennsylvania. He later served as the head football coach at Ursinus College in Collegeville, Pennsylvania.

Zimmerman died on December 5, 1967, at the age of 76.

== Head coaching record ==
=== College football ===
Year	Team	Overall	Conference	Standing	Bowl/playoffs
Millersville Marauders (Independent) (1912–1913)
1912	Millersville	3–2–2			
1913	Millersville	0–8			
Millersville:		3–10–2			
Ursinus (Independent) (1923–1924)
1923	Ursinus	6–4			
1924	Ursinus	4–6–1			
Ursinus:		10–10–1			
Total:		13–20–1			
