= Kelly Greenberg =

American basketball coach

Playing career
- 1985–1989: La Salle

Coaching career (HC unless noted)
- 1989–1990: Northeastern (assistant)
- 1990–1991: George Washington (assistant)
- 1991–1992: Rhode Island (assistant)
- 1992–1999: Holy Cross (assistant)
- 1999–2004: Penn
- 2004–2014: Boston University

Kelly Greenberg was forced to resign as head coach at Boston University in 2014 amid multiple charges of abusing players, ending her coaching career. Allegations that she mistreated players first surfaced in 2007 when the coach admitted she made some serious mistakes that she deeply regretted. When four players left the team in 2014, an internal investigation concluded that "the manner in which Coach Greenberg interacted with many of her players was incompatible with the expectations and standards for university employees, including our coaches."

== Playing career ==
Greenberg played basketball, field hockey, and softball at Archbishop Wood High School in Philadelphia. Her No. 32 jersey was retired, joining just three other female athletes: former WNBA player Debbie Black, Kathy May Greenberg, Kelly's sister, and Joanne Healy. Kelly is a member of the high school's alumni hall of fame.

Greenberg was a two-time second-team All-Big 5 selection at La Salle University, leading the Explorers to three consecutive Big 5 Championships and NCAA tournaments. She captained the 1988–89 team to a 28–3 overall record, a national ranking, and a third straight trip to the NCAA tournament. Greenberg graduated in 1989 with a bachelor of arts in English.

== Coaching career ==
Kelly Greenberg began her coaching career as an assistant at Northeastern University in 1989–90. Greenberg was a volunteer assistant coach at George Washington University in 1990–91. During her tenure at George Washington, the Colonials reached the NCAA tournament, Greenberg's first trip as a coach. Greenberg was an assistant coach at the University of Rhode Island during the 1991–92 season.

=== Holy Cross ===
Greenberg spent the next seven seasons on the coaching staff at the College of the Holy Cross. During her final three seasons, Greenberg served as the associate head coach under head coach Bill Gibbons. During her tenure, the Crusaders made four trips to the NCAA tournament and won six Patriot League titles.

=== Penn ===
In 1999–2000, her first season as a head coach at The University of Pennsylvania, Greenberg's squad posted its first winning season in eight years. She was named the Philadelphia Big 5 Coach of the Year.

The following season, she guided the Quakers to an Ivy League title as the team went a perfect 14–0 in league games. The team earned the program's first-ever NCAA tournament bid and posted a school-best 22–6 overall record. During the season, the team won a program-record 21 consecutive games, which ranked as the longest active winning streak in the nation at the time. Following the record-breaking season, Greenberg was honored as the Daily Pennsylvanian Coach of the Year for the second consecutive season.

In 2003–04, Greenberg led the team back to the NCAA tournament as Penn recorded a 17–10 overall mark and an 11–3 record in Ivy League play.

After guiding Penn to two Ivy League championships during her five-year tenure, Greenberg was appointed head coach of the Boston University women's basketball program on July 7, 2004.

=== Boston University ===
In her first season as head coach at BU, Greenberg's squad posted a 15–16 overall record. Entering the America East Conference tournament as the eighth-seeded team, BU knocked off top-seeded Maine, fourth-seeded Vermont, and ninth-seeded Stony Brook, becoming the first eighth-seeded team in the tournament's 14-year history to reach the title game. In the finals, BU lost 52–50 to second-seeded Hartford.

In 2005–06, Greenberg led her Terrier team to an 18–12 record and an appearance in the America East tournament title game following a 76–74 overtime victory over second-seeded Stony Brook in the semifinal round.

In 2007–08, the Terriers finished with a 20–12 overall record and 11–5 conference record including a perfect 11–0 record at Case Gym and an 11–1 record at home, with the loss coming to No. 16 Ohio State at Agganis Arena. Greenberg's squad broke program records for points in a season (2,220) and free-throw percentage (.769). The Terriers reached the conference finals against Hartford once again, following a double-overtime victory against rival Vermont in the semifinals. The team reached the 20-win milestone for the first time in 20 years and only the second time in program history.

==== Controversy & Resignation ====
In 2014, Greenberg resigned as head women’s basketball coach after multiple players reported systematic abuse.

Several former Terrier players describe Greenberg's style as confrontational. Twice, in 2008 and 2014, The Boston Globe's Bob Hohler reported on the departures of players who claim they were bullied by the coach.

Greenberg and Boston University parted ways on April 22, 2014, amid allegations of player emotional abuse.
