= Echoes in the Darkness =

Book by Joseph Wambaugh

- First edition
- Author: Joseph Wambaugh
- Cover artist: Paul Bacon
- Language: English
- Publisher: William Morrow & Co
- Publication date: 1984
- Publication place: United States
- Media type: Print
- Pages: 416 pp
- ISBN: 0-688-06889-8

Echoes in the Darkness is the title of a 1984 book by crime writer Joseph Wambaugh which also became a made-for-TV movie in 1987. The book details the lurid tale of the murder of Pennsylvania's Upper Merion Area High School English teacher Susan Reinert and her two children in 1979. The case captured national media attention. Both her boss, high school principal Jay C. Smith, and her lover and colleague William Bradfield were convicted, although Smith's conviction was later overturned, because of police and prosecutorial misconduct in the case.

The chief investigator, John J. Holtz of the Pennsylvania State Police, later admitted having accepted $50,000 from author Wambaugh. The money was provided on the condition that suspect Jay Smith be arrested.

== Adaptation ==
Echoes in the Darkness was adapted into a made-for-television mini-series in 1987. The television production starred Treat Williams, Peter Coyote, Stockard Channing, Peter Boyle, Gary Cole and Robert Loggia, and was directed by Glenn Jordan.
