= Philadelphia Catholic League =

American Catholic high school sports league

The Philadelphia Catholic League is a high school sports league composed (as of the 2012-13 year) of 19 Catholic High Schools in Philadelphia and the surrounding Pennsylvania suburbs. The league itself was founded in the summer of 1920 on the steps of Villanova academy (now Alumni Hall on Villanova University's campus) by Monsignor Bonner. The league originally consisted of three sports, one per season: Football in the fall, Basketball in the winter and Baseball in the spring. This was expanded in 1944 to include Cross-country in the fall, Wrestling in the winter, and Track in the spring.

Currently, the schools are divided by size (Red/Large, Blue/Small). In football, the blue and red divisions award separate league championships each year, while all other sports have a unified champion. Starting with the 2008–09 school year, the Catholic League joined the Pennsylvania Interscholastic Athletic Association in District XII, competing with Philadelphia Public League teams for a restored City Championship in all sports, which was abandoned following the 1979–80 school year due to a dispute of Title IX as girls from both Public and Catholic high schools were prohibited from competing for City Championships. The football divisions were realigned into Blue AA, Blue AAA, and Red (AAAA) Following the closures of Northeast Catholic High School and Cardinal Dougherty High School, along with the merger of Kennedy-Kenrick Catholic High School into Pope John Paul II High School, along with their decision to join the Pioneer Athletic Conference in Montgomery County, the divisions underwent a realignment in 2010.

== Member schools ==
- Archbishop John Carroll High School (Delaware County)
- Archbishop Ryan High School (Philadelphia)
- Archbishop Wood Catholic High School (Bucks County)
- Bonner & Prendergast Catholic High School (Delaware County)
- Cardinal O'Hara High School (Delaware County)
- Conwell–Egan Catholic High School (Bucks County)
- Devon Preparatory School (Chester County) (boys only)
- Father Judge High School (Philadelphia) (boys only)
- La Salle College High School (Montgomery County) (boys only)
- Lansdale Catholic High School (Montgomery County)
- Little Flower Catholic High School for Girls (Philadelphia) (girls only)
- Nazareth Academy High School (Philadelphia) (girls only)
- Saints John Neumann and Maria Goretti Catholic High School (Philadelphia)
- Roman Catholic High School for Boys (Philadelphia) (boys only)
- Saint Hubert High School (Philadelphia) (girls only)
- Saint Joseph's Preparatory School (Philadelphia) (boys only)
- West Catholic Preparatory High School (Philadelphia)
- Holy Ghost Preparatory School (boys only)

=== Former members ===
- Villanova Preparatory Academy (now Malvern Preparatory School) 1920-1923
- Cathedral Catholic High School 1927-1928
- Salesianum School 1922-1939
- St. Thomas More Catholic High School 1937-1976
- St. James High School for Boys 1943-1993
- Cardinal Dougherty High School 1956-2010
- Northeast Catholic High School 1926-2010
- Kennedy-Kenrick Catholic High School (now Pope John Paul II High School (Pennsylvania)) 1966-2010
- John W. Hallahan Catholic Girls High School 1920-2021
- Bishop McDevitt High School 1958-2021

== See also ==
- Roman Catholic Archdiocese of Philadelphia
- Sports in Philadelphia#Catholic League
