= Rob Lohr =

American gridiron football player (born 1990)

No. 90
- Position: Defensive tackle

Personal information
- Born: March 1, 1990 (age 36); Phoenixville, Pennsylvania, U.S.
- Listed height: 6 ft 4 in (1.93 m)
- Listed weight: 290 lb (132 kg)

Career information
- High school: Phoenixville
- College: Vanderbilt (2008–2012)
- NFL draft: 2013: undrafted

Career history
- 2013: Kansas City Chiefs*
- 2014: BC Lions
- * Offseason or practice squad member only
- Stats at CFL.ca (archive)

James Rober Lohr III (born March 1, 1990) is an American former football defensive tackle. He played college football at Vanderbilt University. He was a member of the Kansas City Chiefs and BC Lions.

== Early life ==
James Rober Lohr III was born on March 1, 1990. He played high school football at Phoenixville Area High School in Phoenixville, Pennsylvania. He was a three-year starter at tight end and defensive end. Lohr was team MVP his senior year, helping the Phantoms to 8–4 record and the AAA state playoffs. He was named Pioneer Conference Defensive Player of the Year and All-Southeastern Pennsylvania team by "Philadelphia Inquirer". He recorded 65 tackles and 15 sacks as a senior at defensive end. He also recorded in 26 catches for 609 yards and five touchdowns at tight end. Lohr was nominated to play in the Pennsylvania East-West Game.

== College career ==
Lohr played for the Vanderbilt Commodores from 2008 to 2012. He started 38 consecutive games to end his college career.

== Professional career ==
Lohr was signed by the Kansas City Chiefs on May 1, 2013, after going undrafted in the 2013 NFL draft. He was released by the Chiefs on August 25, 2013.

Lohr signed with the BC Lions of the Canadian Football League on May 21, 2014. He dressed in two games for the Lions during the 2014 season, posting three tackles on defense.
