= Upper Merion Area High School =

Coordinates: 40.0956°N 75.3778°W

- 465 Crossfield Road; King of Prussia, Pennsylvania, U.S. United States

Information
- Type: Public high school
- Established: 1966
- School district: Upper Merion Area School District
- Superintendent: Dr. Tamara Thomas Smith
- Principal: Jonathan Bauer
- Staff: 93.00 (on an FTE basis)
- Grades: 9-12
- Enrollment: 1,386 (2023–2024)
- Student to teacher ratio: 14.90
- Colors: Gold; Navy Blue
- Athletics conference: PIAA Pioneer Athletic Conference
- Team name: Vikings
- Website: hs.umasd.org

Upper Merion Area High School is a comprehensive public high school, operated by the Upper Merion Area School District, in King of Prussia, Pennsylvania, in Upper Merion Township in the Philadelphia metropolitan area.

A building project to construct a new high school facility began in the spring of 2020, and the building was completed in August 2022. The building is located approximately 15 miles west of Philadelphia.

== Sports ==
Upper Merion has been a member of the Pioneer Athletic Conference since 2016.

Upper Merion Area High School offers the following sports:

Season	Boys	Girls
Fall	Soccer, Football, Cross Country, Golf, Water Polo	Soccer, Cross Country, Field Hockey, Tennis, Volleyball, Water Polo
Winter	Basketball, Indoor Track and Field, Swimming and Diving, Wrestling	Basketball, Indoor Track and Field, Swimming and Diving
Spring	Baseball, Lacrosse, Tennis, Outdoor Track and Field, Crew	Lacrosse, Outdoor Track and Field, Softball, Crew

In 2004, Upper Merion football won the school's first PIAA District One Championship against the Great Valley Patriots. he UM team finished the year with a record of 11-3 and graduated 28 seniors that year.

UM's varsity track and field relay team placed sixth in the state of Pennsylvania in the 4 × 800 meter relay at Shippensburg University. At 7:55.30, it broke a 26-year school record.

Upper Merion Area High School's varsity track and field relay team was crowned Suburban One-American Champions in the 4 × 400 meter relay in the 2005 Spring season, at 3.25.82.

Upper Merion Area High School's varsity baseball team was crowned PIAA District I Champions in their 2008–2009 season.

Upper Merion Area High School's varsity boys lacrosse team was crowned Suburban One-American Champions in their 2010 season.

The varsity girls volleyball team was crowned PIAA District I Champions in the 2010–2011 season. They went on to compete in the PIAA State Championship where they finished as the 2nd best volleyball team in Pennsylvania.

The varsity volleyball team was also crowned PIAA District 1 Champions in the 2013 and 2014 season. They lost in the quarterfinals of the PIAA State Championship in 2013 and lost in the first round in 2014. Adding to a total of six District 1 Championships for the volleyball team.

== Echoes in the Darkness ==
In 1987, the school was the setting for Echoes in the Darkness, a Joseph Wambaugh book detailing the murder of a teacher and her two children for insurance money, allegedly by both the head of the English department, William Bradfield, and former principal Jay C. Smith. This was later converted into a made-for-TV movie starring Stockard Channing, Peter Coyote, and Robert Loggia.

This book and movie were interpretations of the "Mainline Murders," with multiple teachers portrayed in the movie teaching English and Spanish into the 2000s at Upper Merion Area High School. Smith was originally convicted, but had his conviction overturned. Bradfield was convicted and died in prison.

== Notable alumni ==
- Greg Gianforte - businessman and U.S. representative; current governor of Montana
- Kathy Jordan - professional tennis player
- Lisa Salters - ESPN sports reporter
- Brad Scioli - former NFL player for the Indianapolis Colts
- Bob Shoudt - competitive eater
- Evan Wang - 9th National Youth Poet Laureate
