= Sunnybrook (Lower Pottsgrove Township, Pennsylvania) =

- U.S. National Register of Historic Places
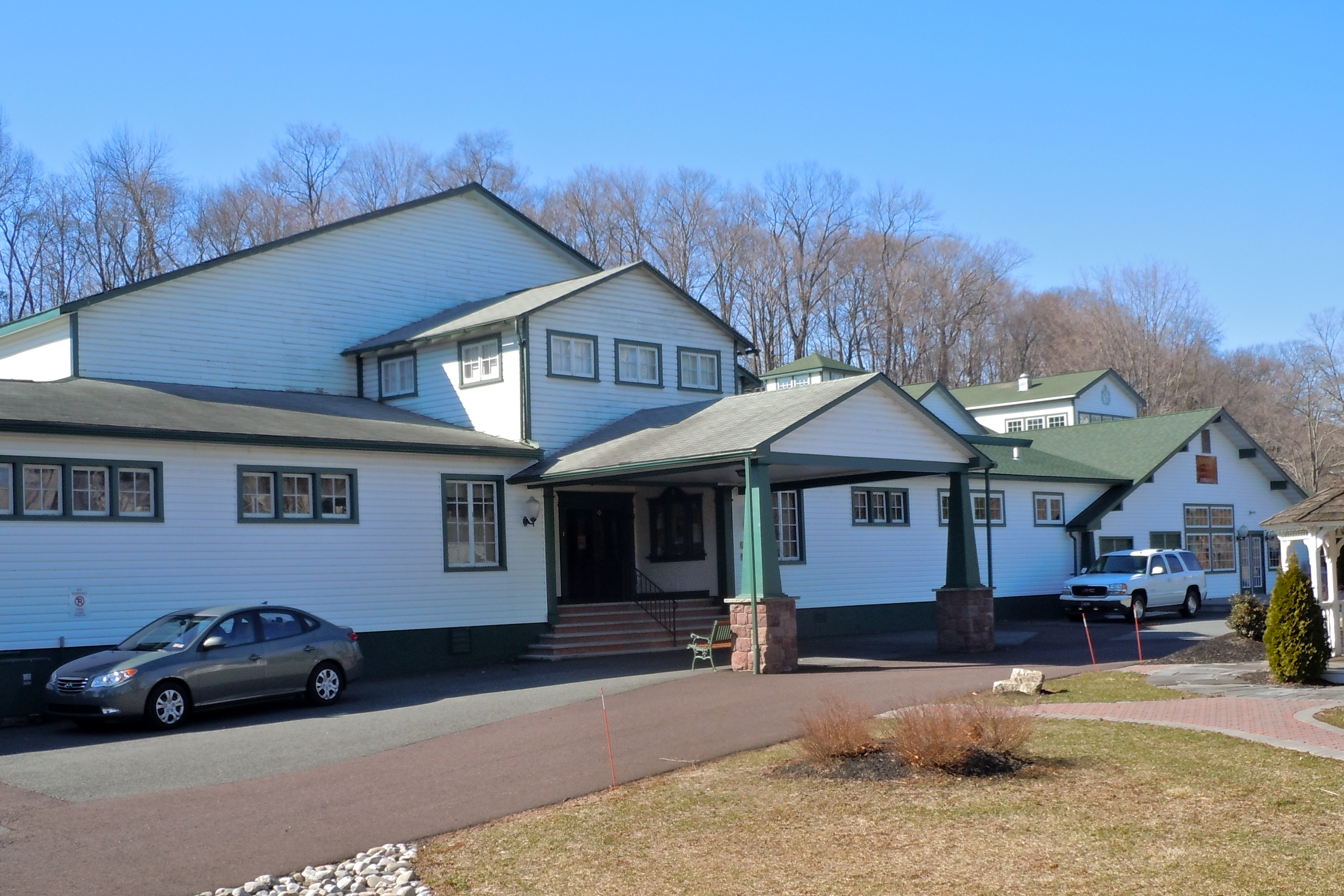
- Sunnybrook, March 2011

- Location within Pennsylvania Location within the United States
- Location: 50 Sunnybrook Rd., Lower Pottsgrove Township, Pennsylvania
- Coordinates: 40°14′55″N 75°36′39″W
- Area: 13.4 acres (5.4 ha)
- Built: 1926
- Architect: Hartenstine, Raymond, Sr.
- NRHP reference No.: 05000855
- Added to NRHP: August 11, 2005

Sunnybrook, also known as the Sunnybrook Park & Ballroom, Sunnybrook Convention Center: Colonial Restaurant, is an historic ballroom and restaurant in Lower Pottsgrove Township, Montgomery County, Pennsylvania, United States.

It was added to the National Register of Historic Places in 2005.

== History and architectural features ==
Built in 1931 and expanded in 1937, this historic structure is a 26,000 square foot, one-story, utilitarian, frame building with exaggerated ceiling heights under various roof angles and heights. It was expanded again in 1964 with the addition of the Colonial Restaurant and in 1998 with a brewery/pub. Also located on the property is a contributing two-story, frame, bath house that was built in 1926. The buildings are part of the Sunnybrook Picnic Park complex.
