= Lisa Salters =

American journalist (born 1966)

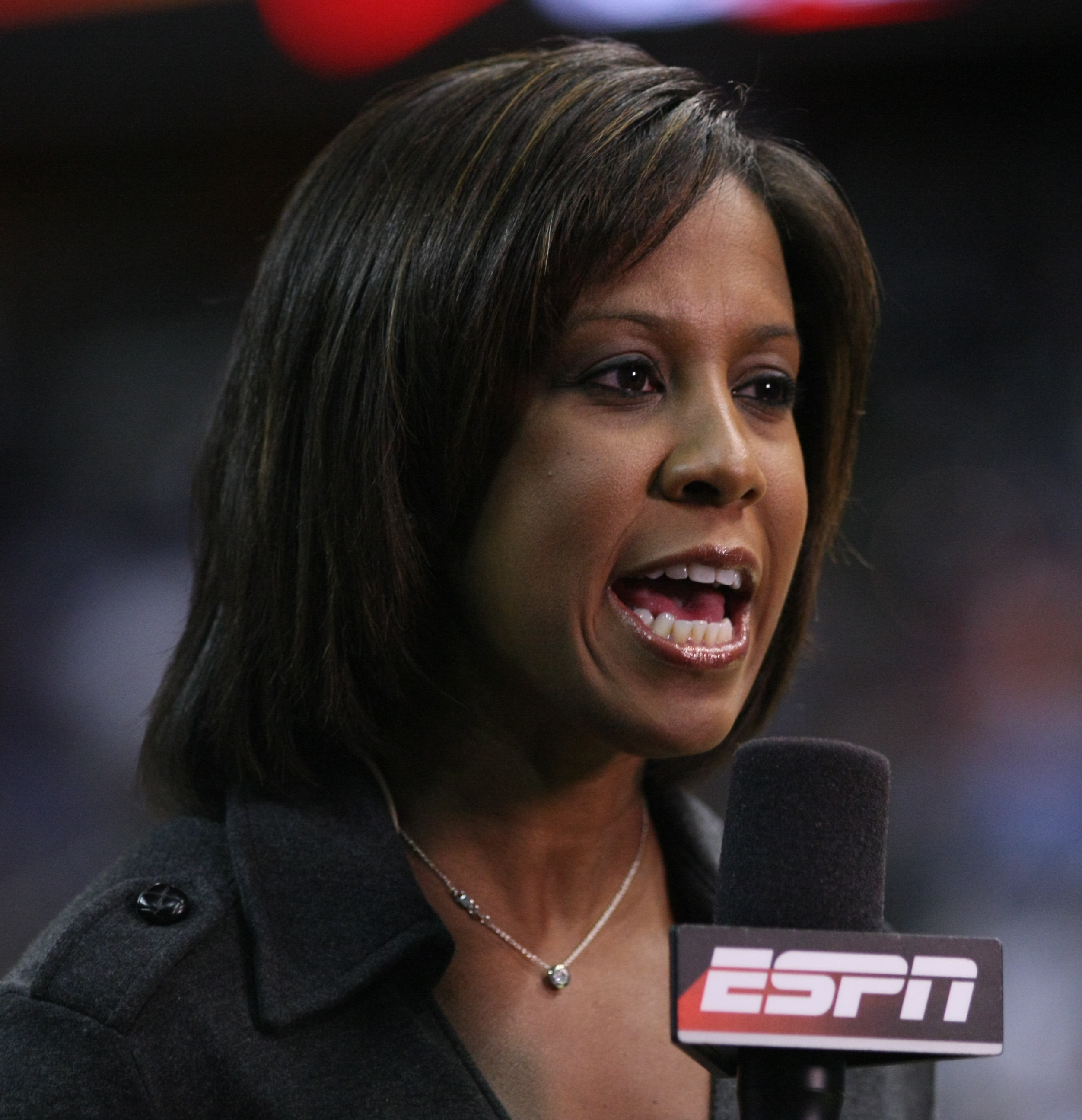
- Salters in 2009
- Born: Alisia Salters; March 6, 1966 (age 60); King of Prussia, Pennsylvania, U.S.
- Education: Pennsylvania State University (BA)
- Occupations: Sportscaster, sports anchor
- Notable credit(s): NBA on ABC, Monday Night Football, E:60, Outside the Lines, World News Tonight, Good Morning America
- Children: 1

Alisia "Lisa" Salters (born March 6, 1966) is an American journalist and former college basketball player who has reported for ESPN and ABC since 2000. Salters covered the O. J. Simpson murder case for ABC News and worked as a reporter at WBAL-TV in Baltimore from 1988 to 1995.

Salters has reported worldwide for ESPN, including a series from the Middle East ahead of the Iraq War. She hosted ESPN's coverage of the 2006 Winter Olympics from Turin, Italy, and ESPN's coverage of the 2002 FIFA World Cup. Salters is a sideline reporter and co-producer for ABC's coverage of the NBA and Monday Night Football.

== Early life and education ==
Salters was born in King of Prussia, Pennsylvania. She attended and graduated from Upper Merion Area High School and was later inducted into the school's Hall of Fame.

She then graduated from Penn State University in 1988 with a bachelor's degree in broadcast journalism. She played guard for the Lady Lions basketball team from 1986 to 1987, where Salters holds the distinction of being the shortest player in school history at 5 feet 2 inches (1.57 m).

== Career ==
=== Early career (1980s-2000) ===
Salters was first a broadcast journalist prior to becoming a sportscaster. In 1995, she was named the first West Coast correspondent for the ABC affiliate news service, NewsOne. Among many notable stories, Salters covered the O.J. Simpson civil and criminal trials, the Oklahoma City bombing trials, the 1998 Winter Olympics in Nagano, Japan, and the crash of TWA flight 800 for the network. It was not until ESPN reached out in 2000 about a general assignment position that she decided to transition to sports journalism. In 1999, she joined Good Morning America.

=== Sports journalism (2000-present) ===
Salters joined ESPN as a general assignment reporter in March 2000. She serves as sideline reporter and co-producer for Monday Night Football and the lead sideline reporter for ESPN's coverage of the NBA on ABC. Salters is also one of the featured correspondents on ESPN's newsmagazine show, E:60, which debuted October 2007. In 2008, she was nominated for a Sports Emmy Award for the story "Ray Of Hope".

At ESPN, Salters' reports have been regularly featured on the award-winning "Outside the Lines" series. She led the network's comprehensive coverage of the murder conspiracy trial of Carolina Panthers wide receiver Rae Carruth in December 2000 through January 2001. Salters was also ESPN's reporter at the 2002 FIFA World Cup in South Korea and Japan, where she broke the news on the U.S. National Team's starting lineup a day before its first match in against Portugal. Salters reported from the 2004 Olympic Games in Athens, Greece and hosted ESPN's coverage of the 2006 Winter Olympics Games in Torino, Italy.

In 2006, Salters served as the lead sideline reporter for ABC's coverage of the NBA on ABC and worked the 2006 NBA Finals on television as that season she filled in for Michele Tafoya who was on maternity leave. Salters returned to her role as its secondary sideline reporter the following year as Tafoya returned to her old role. In 2007, Salters worked the 2007 NBA Finals on radio. In 2009, she was back to being its lead sideline reporter whenever Doris Burke was not there.

Salters prepares for the 2009 Rose Bowl broadcast.

During the build-up to Operation Iraqi Freedom through the commencement of the Iraq War, Salters covered sports-related stories in and around U.S. Central Command in Qatar for Outside the Lines, SportsCenter and ESPNEWS. She returned to the war zone in 2004 when ESPN took SportsCenter on the road and broadcast live from Camp Arifjan, a U.S. Army base in Kuwait.

On December 1, 2007, Salters was covering the Big 12 Championship Game at the Alamodome in San Antonio, Texas. During one of her sideline reports during the first half, Salters mentioned Missouri quarterback Chase Daniel's frustration due to Missouri being stymied by the Oklahoma defense, saying Daniel was "upset" and "fuming." However, a technical blunder caused Salters' microphone to be broadcast over the stadium's PA system. The camera shifted to Chase Daniel, who was visibly perplexed and curious as to who was talking about him and why it was being heard throughout the entire stadium. ABC TV announcer Brent Musburger then mused, "Lisa was talking to a lot more folks than she anticipated." The likely explanation was that Salters' mic was to have been hooked up to the PA for the upcoming halftime contest, and her microphone was inadvertently left on the PA after a pregame sound check.

Prior to joining ESPN, Salters served as a Los Angeles-based correspondent for ABC News from 1995 to 2000 and provided news coverage for World News Tonight with Peter Jennings and other ABC News broadcasts. At ABC News, she covered the Oklahoma City bombing trials, the Matthew Shepard murder, the crash of TWA Flight 800, and both the civil and criminal O. J. Simpson trials.

In 2012, ESPN announced that Salters would join Monday Night Football, replacing Suzy Kolber as a full-time solo sideline reporter, joining Mike Tirico and Jon Gruden. Six years later, ESPN announced a new Monday Night Football commentating team which included Salters as sideline reporter and joined by Joe Tessitore and Booger McFarland. In 2020, Steve Levy, Brian Griese, and Louis Riddick replaced Tessitore and McFarland to join Salters on MNF. In 2022, Joe Buck and Troy Aikman came from Fox Sports to be on MNF with Salters. Laura Rutledge was added as a second sideline reporter in 2025.

== Personal life ==
Salters is a cousin of former University of Pittsburgh and Dallas Cowboys running back Tony Dorsett.

In 2013, Salters adopted a son after years of trying to have a child on her own.

Salters resides in Nashville, Tennessee, with her partner, Indiana Fever head coach Stephanie White, White's three sons, and her own son.

On October 13, 2017, Salters was inducted into the Montgomery County Chapter of the Pennsylvania Sports Hall of Fame.
