= Norristown High School =

Norristown Area High School
- Norristown High School
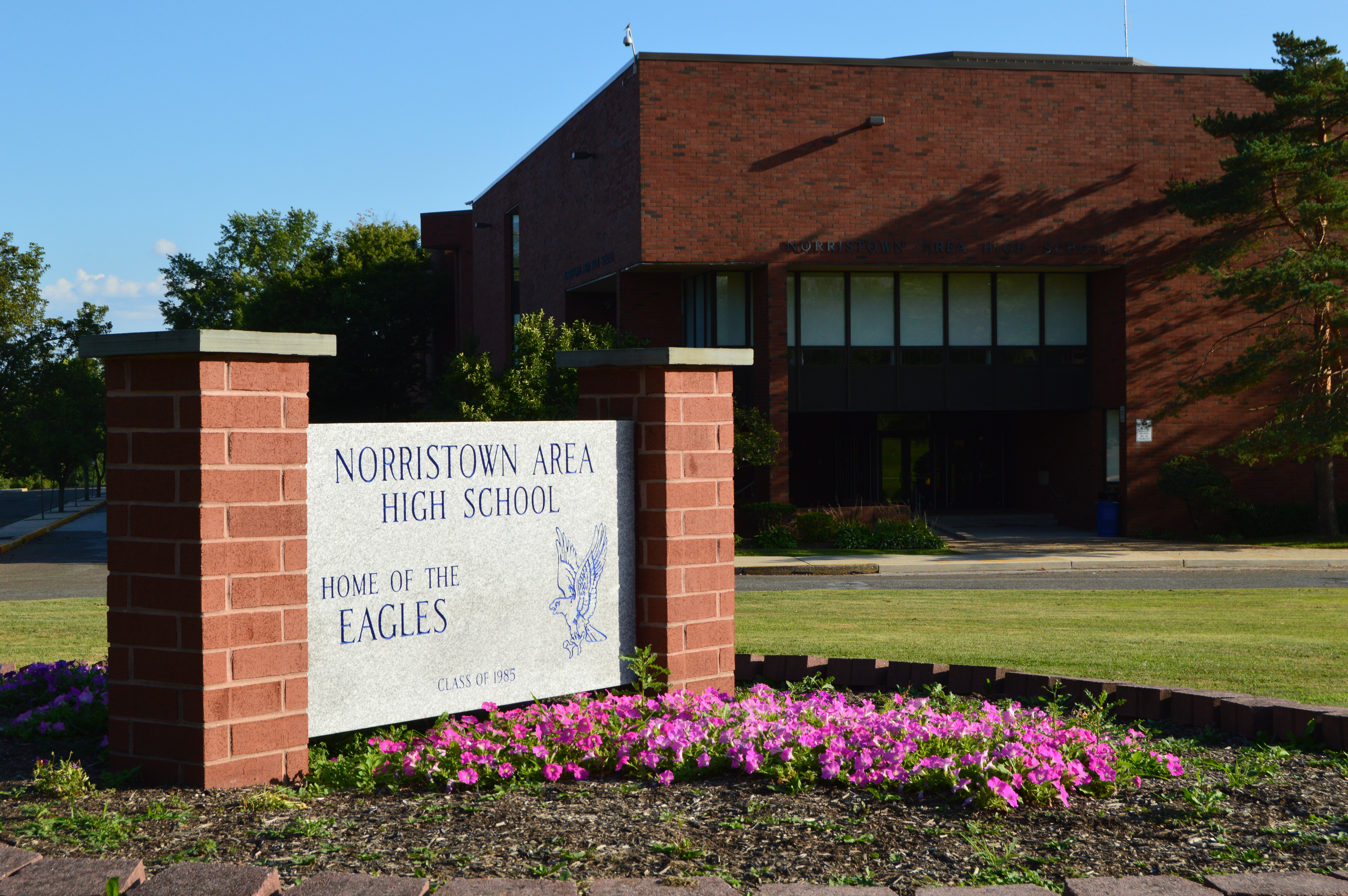

Location
- 1900 Eagle Drive; Norristown, Montgomery County, Pennsylvania 19403; United States; 40°8′49″N 75°21′44″W

Information
- Type: Public high school
- Established: c. 1870
- Principal: Dr. Detrick McGriff
- Enrollment: 2260 (2025-2026)
- Colors: Blue and white
- Song: Blue and White
- Athletics conference: Pioneer Athletic Conference
- Mascot: Eagle
- Nickname: Eagles
- Website: https://www.nasd.k12.pa.us/o/nahs

Norristown Area High School is a high school in Norristown, Pennsylvania, United States.

== History ==
The Norristown Area High School (NAHS) was established in 1870 in the Borough of Norristown and relocated to West Norriton Township in 1972. The student population is about 2260 students in grades 9-12.

The high school utilizes a modified alternate day block schedule, offers all core courses in a college prep and weighted honors format, and has entered into a partnership with Montgomery County Community College to offer dual enrollment (both high school and college credit) in a number of courses.

== Athletics ==
Norristown Area High School was a member of the Suburban One League, American Conference, one of four remaining founding members of the league. In 2016 the school joined the Pioneer Athletic Conference (PAC), Liberty Division, after a unanimous vote by the board in January 2015.

The basketball team holds one state championship, 5 regional championships, 8 District One Championships, and 30 League Championships. In 2017, the Norristown Area School District hired NAHS alumni Dana "Binky" Johnson as the new head coach.

There is a marching band inside the school district. They are a part of Cavalcade of Bands American division.

== Notable alumni ==
- Betty Bobbitt, star of Prisoner: Cell Block H
- Steve Bono, former NFL quarterback
- Tom Lasorda, Major League Baseball pitcher, coach, and manager
- Bobby Mitchell, former Major League Baseball player
- Jerry Spinelli, children's author. Two of his books are set in the Norristown area.
- Kellee Stewart, graduated from NASD in 1993.
- Henry “Big H” Williams, Former NBA player for Utah Stars and New York Knicks
- Khalif Wyatt (born 1991), Former American basketball player for Champagne Basket of the French Élite 2
- Josh Culbreath (died 2021), Olympic track runner, Second in the US in 1951, Bronze in 400 meter hurtles during the 1956 Summer Olympics
