= Archbishop Wood Catholic High School =

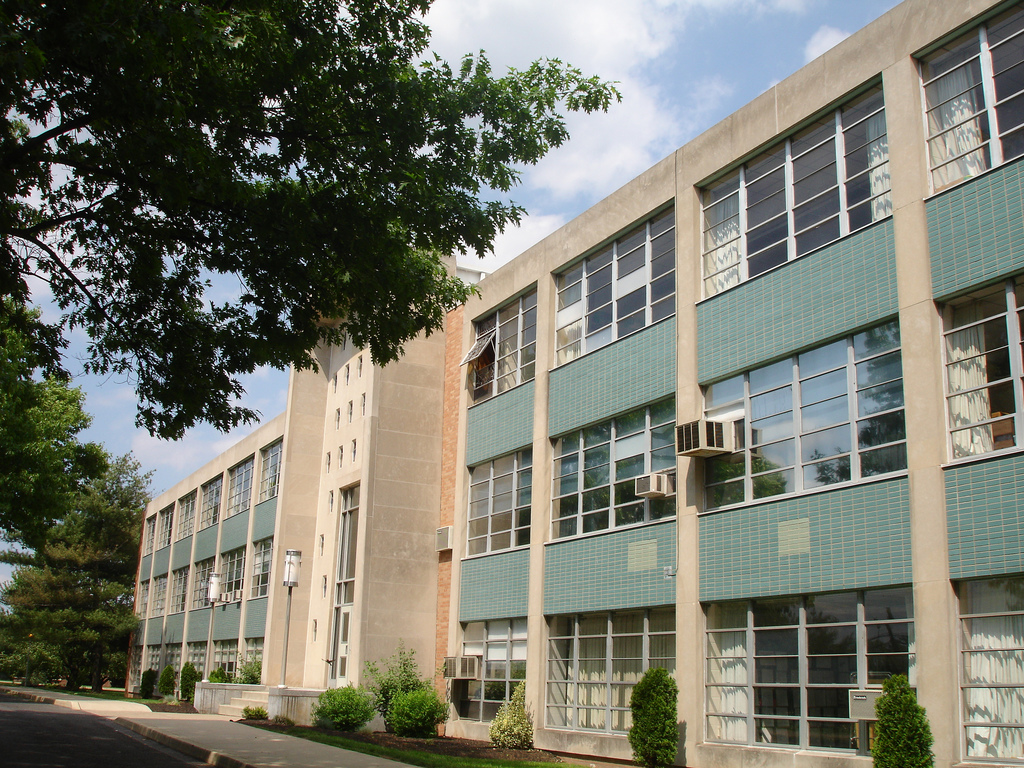

Location
- 655 York Road; Warminster, (Bucks County), Pennsylvania 18974; United States; 40°12′33″N 75°5′56″W

Information
- Type: Private, Coeducational
- Motto: Coronam Fidelitas Merebit (Faithfulness Merits the Crown)
- Religious affiliation: Roman Catholic
- Established: 1964
- School district: Archdiocese of Philadelphia
- Superintendent: William Brannick
- President: John Iannarelli
- Principal: Katherine Nobles
- Chaplain: Rev. Shane Flanagan
- Teaching staff: 50.9 (on an FTE basis)
- Grades: 9–12
- Enrollment: 839 (2021–22)
- Average class size: 25
- Student to teacher ratio: 16.5
- Campus size: 32 acres (130,000 m^{2})
- Colors: Black, Green and Gold
- Athletics conference: Philadelphia Catholic League
- Team name: Vikings
- Accreditation: Middle States Association of Colleges and Schools
- Newspaper: The Viking Voice
- Tuition: $10,500
- Affiliation: Archdiocese of Philadelphia
- Website: www.archwood.org

Archbishop Wood Catholic High School is a private, Roman Catholic high school within the Archdiocese of Philadelphia. The school was founded in 1964 in Warminster Township in Bucks County, Pennsylvania. It sits on thirty-two acre tract of land and maintains various athletic fields on its campus, as well as a daycare facility, and a home for retired diocesan priests. It is accredited by both the National Catholic Educational Association and Middle States Association of Colleges and Schools.

== School history ==
Construction began on the campus of Archbishop Wood High Schools in the spring of 1963. It opened its doors to students in the fall of 1964, accepting freshman and sophomore transfers for the first years. It was originally designated as two separate schools, identical in their structure and management, one of boys and girls respectively. Wood was given its named after Philadelphia's 19th-century Archbishop James Frederick Bryan Wood. At its maximum capacity in 1978 it had 2456 students enrolled.

Archbishop Wood High School for boys was among a handful of schools that Buckminster Fuller gave speaking engagements at in 1975.

As of 2016 the campus also includes a childcare center in the former convent which it runs as a joint venture with Nativity of Our Lord Parish, which it neighbors.

== Academics ==
Over 98% of Wood students take the SATs each year, with the average SAT score for its student body at 1200. 75% of the graduating class attend a four-year college, while 19% attend a two-year college. The student-to-teacher ratio is 18:1 as of 2022.

The school currently offers thirteen Advanced Placement courses available for college-level credit available to juniors and seniors. The school also offers its St. Thomas More Honors program to select students enrolled to assist in college preparation.

== Athletics ==
Archbishop Wood has been a member of the Philadelphia Catholic League since its opening in 1964. It offers various sports, including: Football, Boys & Girls Soccer, Boys & Girls Cross-Country, Field Hockey, Wrestling, Boys & Girls Basketball, Volleyball, Boys & Girls Indoor Track, Bowling, Baseball, Softball, Boys & Girls Lacrosse, Boys & Girls Track, Boys & Girls Swimming, Tennis, Golf, and Club Hockey. Archbishop Wood also utilizes adjacent fields at Munro Park in Warminster and also at neighboring William Tennent High School.

== Religious communities ==
From its founding 1964 Wood was staffed by various Catholic religious houses who resided on the property itself. While the school was split by sex the boys' school was staffed by priests and the girls' school by nuns. Over the years various religious communities have run the administration of the school itself, including the Fathers of the Congregation of the Immaculate Heart of Mary (CICM), Vincentian Fathers (CM), Oblates of Saint Francis de Sales (OSFS), Sisters of the Immaculate Heart of Mary (IHM), Sisters of Saint Joseph (SSJ), Religious Sisters of Mercy (RSM), and the Religious of the Assumption (RA). The Belgian Missionhurst Friars who originally staffed the boys' school in 1964 were transfers from Brussels and had previously been instrumental in the native resistance to the occupation of the country by Nazi Germany. The male religious orders left the school in 1991, the IHM sisters left the grounds in 2001. Wood continues to have religious in its faculty proper, but is mainly staffed by laity.

== Notable alumni ==
- Henry G. Ulrich III (1968), Four Star Admiral in the U.S. Navy
- Andrew M. Allen (1973), American Astronaut and Marine Aviator
- Frank Naylor (1977), Professional Football Player, New Jersey Generals
- Claire Cardie (1978), American Computer Scientist, Professor at Cornell University
- Thomas P. Murt (1978), Member of the Pennsylvania House of Representatives
- Mark Kearney (1980), United States District Judge
- Marguerite Quinn (1981), Member of the Pennsylvania House of Representatives
- Terri Schiavo (1981), A famous legal and ethical case of a woman in an irreversible persistent vegetative state.
- Debbie Black (1984), Woman's Basketball Player and Coach
- Kelly Greenberg (1986), Former Women's Basketball Coach at the University of Pennsylvania
- Irene Molloy (1996), Television Actress
- Glen Foster (1998), Reality Television Star, Philadelphia 76ers Mascot 'Little G'
- Pam Rosanio (2004), Women's International Basketball Player
- Brian O'Grady (2010), Professional Baseball Player for the Cincinnati Reds, Tampa Bay Rays and the San Diego Padres
- Colin Thompson (2012), Football Player for the Carolina Panthers
- Ryan Bates (2015)
- Anthony Russo (2016) professional football quarterback
- Mark Webb (2016) Football Player for the Florida Gators and Atlanta Falcons
- Collin Gillespie (2017) Basketball Player for the Phoenix Suns
- Kyle Pitts (2018) Football Player for the Atlanta Falcons
- Andrew Funk (2018) Basketball Player for the Chicago Bulls
- Gary Martin (runner) (2022), track and field athlete
- Jalil Bethea (2024) Basketball player who plays for the Miami Hurricanes

== See also ==
- Philadelphia Catholic League
- Archdiocese of Philadelphia
