= Neal Olkewicz =

American football player (born 1957)

No. 52
- Position: Linebacker

Personal information
- Born: January 30, 1957 (age 69); Phoenixville, Pennsylvania, U.S.
- Listed height: 6 ft 0 in (1.83 m)
- Listed weight: 230 lb (104 kg)

Career information
- High school: Phoenixville (Phoenixville, Pennsylvania)
- College: Maryland
- NFL draft: 1979: undrafted

Career history
- Washington Redskins (1979–1989)

Awards and highlights
- 2× Super Bowl champion (XVII, XXII); 70 Greatest Redskins

Career NFL statistics
- Sacks: 13.5
- Interceptions: 6
- Touchdowns: 1
- Stats at Pro Football Reference

Neal T. Olkewicz (born January 30, 1957) is an American former professional football player who spent his entire 11-year career as a linebacker for the Washington Redskins of the National Football League (NFL) from 1979 to 1989. He played college football for the Maryland Terrapins.

== Early life ==
Olkewicz was born in Phoenixville, Pennsylvania and attended Phoenixville High School, where he played football and baseball.

== College career ==
Olkewicz played college football at the University of Maryland from 1975 to 1978. While at Maryland, Olkewicz played in four bowl games - the Gator Bowl, Cotton Bowl, the Hall of Fame Classic, and the Sun Bowl. In 1978, he led the Terrapins' defense by making 188 tackles, a school record that still remains intact.

== Professional career ==
Olkewicz signed with the Washington Redskins as a free agent in 1979. He won two Super Bowl Championships with victories over the Miami Dolphins (1982) and the Denver Broncos (1987). He was named the Redskins’ Defensive MVP in 1988. Olkewicz is one of only five players in NFL history to play in a Super Bowl on his birthday (Super Bowl XVII). He retired in 1989 following the Redskins victory over the Seattle Seahawks in the season finale. He played 150 games in his career and finished with six interceptions for 76 yards, one touchdown and 12 sacks.

== After football ==
Since retirement, Olkewicz has owned a vending business in Rockville, Maryland called Olkewicz Vending serving the Washington metropolitan area. He was inducted into the Chester County Sports Hall of Fame in 2012 and the Pennsylvania Sports Hall of Fame in 2015. He is currently working as an aide at Pottsgrove High School in Pottstown, Pennsylvania.
