= Jay C. Smith =

American with overturned conviction (1928–2009)

- Born: June 5, 1928; United States
- Died: May 12, 2009 (aged 80); Wilkes-Barre, Pennsylvania, United States
- Occupations: Officer, United States Army; Colonel, United States Army Reserve; Principal, Upper Merion Area High School
- Known for: Overturned conviction, Susan Reinert murder case

Jay C. Smith (June 5, 1928 – May 12, 2009) was an American high school principal in Pennsylvania who was convicted and sentenced to death in 1986 for the 1979 murder of one of his school's teachers, Susan Reinert, and her two children, Karen and Michael. His conviction was overturned by the Supreme Court of Pennsylvania in 1992, based on findings of judicial and prosecutorial misconduct.

Smith subsequently filed civil suits against those involved in his conviction. However, all of them were rejected. An appellate court stated, "Our confidence in Smith's convictions for the murder of Susan Reinert and her two children is not the least bit diminished."

== Formative years ==
Born on June 5, 1928, Smith grew up during the Great Depression. He enlisted with the United States Army as a private in 1946 and rose up through the ranks to become a senior-level officer. In 1962, he was awarded the Army Commendation Medal. Later commissioned as a lieutenant colonel, he transferred to the United States Army Reserves (Reserves) and was subsequently appointed as unit commander of the 183rd U.S. Army Terminal Station "based on both his qualifications and his demonstrated ability to command," and was described by his superiors as someone who was "unusually dedicated to the Reserve Program with a demonstrated level of high ability and ingenuity in both military and civilian accomplishments." During the aftermath of 1972's Hurricane Agnes, he helped to coordinate relief services for flood victims in Pennsylvania. In 1972, he was awarded the Navy Unit Commendation "for exceptionally meritorious service," and was a second-time recipient of the Army Commendation Medal in 1974.

While still a serving officer with the Reserves, he completed his Bachelor of Science degree in education and English in 1972. He earned a Master of Science degree at Pennsylvania State University, then completed his Doctor of Education degree at Temple University, in 1974. He retired from military service, as a full colonel, in 1976.

== Academic career and legal problems ==
Hired by the school board of the Upper Merion Area School District in King of Prussia, Pennsylvania, Smith was appointed by the board as the principal of Upper Merion Area High School.

=== History of the Reinert case ===
Smith was the principal of Upper Merion Area High School when Reinert and her colleague, William Bradfield, were teachers there during the early to late 1970s. Reinert taught English. She and Bradfield reportedly had planned to be married; approximately one month prior to her 1979 murder, Reinert declared Bradfield to be the sole beneficiary of a life insurance policy that was valued at roughly $500,000 (equivalent to $2.2 million in 2025). He was also the sole beneficiary of her $230,000 estate (equivalent to $1.0 million in 2025).

Smith was subsequently convicted of a series of store robberies during the late 1970s, despite Bradfield testifying on his behalf that the robberies must have been perpetrated by someone else because he and Smith had been vacationing far away in Ocean City when the robberies were committed. Smith allegedly arrived late to his subsequent sentencing hearing in Harrisburg, Pennsylvania, four hours after Reinert's body was discovered in the trunk of her car, which had been parked at a Harrisburg motel parking lot that was located roughly one hundred miles away from her home in Ardmore. Police were initially unable to find an explanation for why she had left home two days before her body was found or why her body and car had ended up in Harrisburg. They were also initially unable to locate her children, whom they subsequently classified as "missing." A pathologist subsequently determined that Reinert had been suffocated.

As the police investigation continued, police were told that Bradfield was visiting Cape May with three other teachers from Upper Merion during the weekend that Reinert was murdered. Reinert had reportedly either left or been taken from her Ardmore home before 9 p.m. on Friday, June 22, 1979 and was then killed sometime between midnight on Saturday, June 23 and midnight on Sunday, June 24. Bradfield and the other teachers reportedly arrived at 5 a.m. Saturday in Cape May, where they remained until the afternoon of Monday, June 25; Bradfield's whereabouts during the time of Reinert's disappearance, however, were unclear. Smith's whereabouts during this same time were also unclear.

In 1981, Bradfield was tried for allegedly defrauding Reinert by taking $25,000 (equivalent to $0.1 million in 2025) from her and telling her he would invest it in a "high-yielding certificate." During the coverage of his trial, newspapers reported that Reinert's children were still missing, but now "presumed dead." He was subsequently found guilty of fraud.

By 1983, police had uncovered more details about the murder case. Reinert, who had been volunteering during her non-teaching hours as the director of Parents without Partners, had voluntarily left her Ardmore home with her children on Friday evening, June 22, 1979, shortly after 9 p.m., to drive to Allentown, Pennsylvania, for a Parents without Partners weekend gathering. Her neighbors confirmed for police this was the last time they saw Reinert and her children alive. Three days later, an anonymous caller informed police that Reinert's car was parked at a motel in Harrisburg. When police arrived, they found Reinert's body in the trunk of her car, but there was no sign of the children. Although a pathologist had determined that Reinert had been suffocated, police investigators subsequently determined that she had been beaten and drugged prior to her murder, and that it was the large amount of morphine that had been injected into her system that actually caused her death. The police also determined that on "the day that Ms. Reinert's body was found, Smith was in Harrisburg, a few miles from the death scene, where he was to be sentenced on firearms and disorderly conduct charges. He arrived in court nearly an hour late, explaining he had been stuck in a gas station line." According to police, Smith had "reportedly made advances to Susan Reinert during one period and was rejected." Police also told the media that, during the course of their investigation, they had found "a blue comb with the inscription, '79th Army Reserve Command'", in the car next to Reinert's body, and had since learned that Smith had been a colonel in that same army unit. However, although the police were investigating Smith, the grand jury that was analyzing the police reports of the Reinert case investigation were offered "no evidence linking Smith to the murder." The grand jury's presentment did indicate, though, that "there was an association of two or more people and a continuing conspiracy between/among them to murder Susan Reinert."

During those grand jury proceedings, it was revealed that several former teaching colleagues and former students of Bradfield "had testified to the grand jury that Bradfield, for months before Ms. Reinert's death, had kept telling them that she would be killed by Jay Smith." Bradfield was subsequently charged with "masterminding" Reinert's murder and "with kidnapping and killing her children." Placed in jail at the Delaware County Prison, following his conviction for fraud, Bradfield reportedly told a fellow inmate "that the whole plan of the crime ... was only to involve 'Susan,' but that something had gone wrong," and said "it was a shame the children had to suffer by mistake." He also reportedly said "that when 'they' were killed, he had been present."

In April 1983, as it was preparing to cover Bradfield's trial for murder, the Philadelphia Daily News described Smith as "an integral piece of the puzzle surrounding Reinert's murder," noting: "In part, the suspicion surrounding Smith can be traced to his own problems with the law, which began Aug. 19, 1978, almost a year before Reinert's death."

"Smith, Upper Merion high school principal for 12 years, was arrested leaving the Gateway Shopping Center in Tredyffrin Township, Chester County, after he was seen wearing a hood and brandishing two pistols.

When police stopped Smith and searched his car, they found four handguns, including one fitted with a homemade silencer. In a pocket of Smith's suit coat, police found a syringe loaded with a prescription sedative.

Following the arrest, Smith's life went rapidly downhill. First, he was charged with drug possession, stemming from the discovery of three pounds of marijuana in his home. Security guard uniforms also recovered from his home were used to link Smith to the August 1977 theft of $53,000 [(equivalent to $0.3 million in 2025)] from a Sears store in St. David's ... and the attempted theft of $158,000 [(equivalent to $0.8 million in 2025)] from Sears store in the Neshaminy Mall...."

After Smith's 1978 arrest, Bradfield told friends he was assisting Smith with his defense. Smith, however, pleaded no contest to the Tredyffrin charges and was convicted on other criminal counts. Bradfield's claims of assisting with Smith's defense, though, proved to be another pivotal point in the Reinert murder investigation, prompting police to look more closely at Smith's background and recent activities, according to testimony that police later gave the grand jury, and to also investigate the potential disappearance of Smith's 24-year-old daughter and his 30-year-old son-in-law, Stephanie and Edward Hunsberger. The young couple were long-time heroin addicts; Stephanie had resorted to prostitution, and Edward had been convicted of armed robbery, in support of their addiction. Last seen in August 1979, Smith claimed the couple had relocated to California, to avoid local drug dealers they owed money to, though some of their belongings were still present in Smith's home, which they had moved to in September 1977.

Tried in 1983 for the Reinert murders, Bradfield was convicted of conspiracy to commit the murders. He was sentenced to life imprisonment and died in prison in January 1998.

Three years later, Smith was also tried for the murders of Reinert and her children. During his trial, it was revealed that a green pin that Reinert's daughter, Karen, had been wearing on the day she disappeared "was found under the front passenger seat of Smith's car."

Convicted in 1986 of the murders of Susan, Karen and Michael Reinert, Smith spent six years on Pennsylvania's death row until his conviction was overturned by the Pennsylvania Supreme Court in 1992 due to judicial and prosecutorial misconduct. According to Smith's obituary in The New York Times:

"In 1992, the Pennsylvania Supreme Court overturned Mr. Smith's conviction on the grounds that the judge had erred by allowing hearsay evidence from Mr. Bradfield's friends. The high court also found fault with the prosecution for withholding evidence of sand found on Ms. Reinert during the autopsy on her body, sand that could have come from the beach that Mr. Bradfield and his friends claim to have visited. The prior procedure after such rulings was to have another trial. But because of what the Supreme Court deemed outrageous behavior by prosecutors, the justices said another trial would amount to placing Mr. Smith in double jeopardy. Before the Smith ruling, double jeopardy, which prevents a new prosecution, was found to exist only when defendants were acquitted or when prosecutors had deliberately provoked a mistrial."

Smith subsequently filed multiple lawsuits against the Pennsylvania State Police and against Joseph Wambaugh, "accusing them of colluding to convict him falsely, but lost all of them, the last one in 2000," according to The New York Times. It was repeatedly found that Smith's conviction had not been unjust. An appellate court stated that, "Even if we ignore the hearsay statements that were improperly admitted against Smith, and even if we also ignore Martray's suspect testimony, our confidence in Smith's convictions is not diminished in the least." In its ruling, the justices went over evidence that tied Smith to the murders. For example, he had written a letter to his wife, asking her to dispose of pieces of incriminating evidence against him.

Smith's daughter, Stephanie Hunsberger, and her husband have never been found. The couple was reported missing in 1978.

== Later life ==
Following his release from prison, Smith relocated to Luzerne County, Pennsylvania, where he settled near the Borough of Dallas to be closer to his younger daughter, Char. Widowed by his first wife, Stephanie (Zdun) Smith, who had succumbed to complications from cancer in August 1979, he remarried in 2002. He and his second wife, Maureen, became resident administrators of an adult-care facility and subsequently lived in a community for senior citizens in Hunlock Creek.

== Death ==
Smith died from a heart condition while receiving treatment in the Wilkes-Barre General Hospital in Wilkes-Barre, Pennsylvania, on May 12, 2009. He reportedly maintained that he was innocent of the Reinert murders until the end of his life, and was buried with full military honors at the Chapel Lawn Burial Park in Dallas, Pennsylvania.

== In popular culture ==
Smith was portrayed by actor Robert Loggia in the two-part, made-for-television movie, Echoes in the Darkness, which was based on Joseph Wambaugh's book by the same name. It aired on CBS in early November 1987.

The murder case was featured in the pilot episode of the documentary TV series Death By Gossip with Wendy Williams, which aired on Investigation Discovery.
