= Pottsgrove, Pennsylvania =

Unincorporated community in Pennsylvania, US

Pottsgrove
- Census-designated place
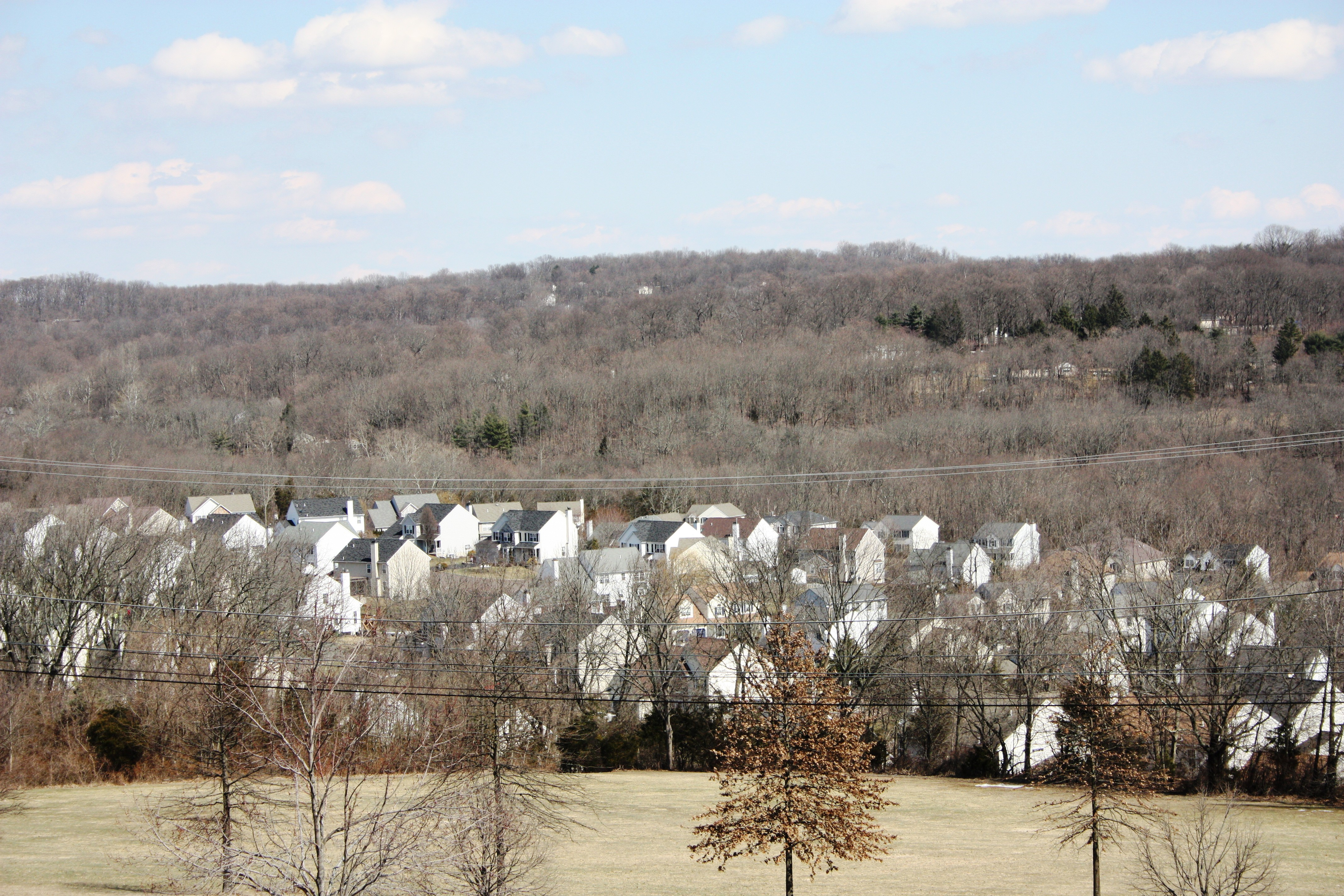

- Location of Pottsgrove in Pennsylvania
- Coordinates: 40°15′43″N 75°36′45″W
- Country: United States
- State: Pennsylvania
- County: Montgomery
- Township: Lower Pottsgrove

Area
  - Total: 2.76 sq mi (7.16 km^{2})
  - Land: 2.76 sq mi (7.16 km^{2})
  - Water: 0 sq mi (0.00 km^{2})
- Elevation: 256 ft (78 m)

Population (2020)
  - Total: 3,471
  - Density: 1,255.5/sq mi (484.75/km^{2})
- Time zone: UTC-5 (EST)
  - Summer (DST): UTC-4 (EDT)
- Area code: 610
- FIPS code: 42-62396

Pottsgrove is a census-designated place (CDP) in Montgomery County, Pennsylvania, United States. The population was 3,469 at the 2010 census.

== Geography ==
Pottsgrove is located at 40°15′43″N 75°36′45″W (40.261983, -75.612585).

According to the United States Census Bureau, the CDP has a total area of 2.7 square miles (7.0 km^{2}), all land.

== Demographics ==
Historical population
Census	Pop.	Note	%±
1990	3,122		—
2000	3,266		4.6%
2010	3,469		6.2%
2020	3,471		0.1%
U.S. Decennial Census

=== 2020 census ===
As of the 2020 census, Pottsgrove had a population of 3,471. The median age was 45.8 years. 20.6% of residents were under the age of 18 and 20.0% of residents were 65 years of age or older. For every 100 females there were 96.9 males, and for every 100 females age 18 and over there were 95.0 males age 18 and over.

100.0% of residents lived in urban areas, while 0.0% lived in rural areas.

There were 1,311 households in Pottsgrove, of which 30.0% had children under the age of 18 living in them. Of all households, 64.2% were married-couple households, 11.6% were households with a male householder and no spouse or partner present, and 17.0% were households with a female householder and no spouse or partner present. About 17.2% of all households were made up of individuals and 9.0% had someone living alone who was 65 years of age or older.

There were 1,362 housing units, of which 3.7% were vacant. The homeowner vacancy rate was 0.8% and the rental vacancy rate was 10.2%.

Racial composition as of the 2020 census
Race	Number	Percent
White	3,039	87.6%
Black or African American	151	4.4%
American Indian and Alaska Native	10	0.3%
Asian	42	1.2%
Native Hawaiian and Other Pacific Islander	0	0.0%
Some other race	35	1.0%
Two or more races	194	5.6%
Hispanic or Latino (of any race)	133	3.8%

=== 2010 census ===
As of the 2010 census, the CDP was 93.2% Non-Hispanic White, 3.1% Black or African American, 0.9% Asian, and 1.4% were two or more races. 1.8% of the population were of Hispanic or Latino ancestry.

=== 2000 census ===
At the 2000 census there were 3,266 people, 1,203 households, and 973 families living in the CDP. The population density was 1,191.7 inhabitants per square mile (460.1/km^{2}). There were 1,237 housing units at an average density of 451.4 per square mile (174.3/km^{2}). The racial makeup of the CDP was 97.52% White, 0.89% African American, 0.03% Native American, 0.83% Asian, 0.03% Pacific Islander, 0.12% from other races, and 0.58% from two or more races. Hispanic or Latino people of any race were 0.61%.

There were 1,203 households, 33.5% had children under the age of 18 living with them, 72.3% were married couples living together, 6.0% had a female householder with no husband present, and 19.1% were non-families. 15.5% of households were made up of individuals, and 8.0% were one person aged 65 or older. The average household size was 2.71 and the average family size was 3.02.

The age distribution was 24.7% under the age of 18, 5.0% from 18 to 24, 28.0% from 25 to 44, 28.3% from 45 to 64, and 14.0% 65 or older. The median age was 41 years. For every 100 females, there were 101.6 males. For every 100 females age 18 and over, there were 95.7 males.

The median household income was $63,750 and the median family income was $68,578. Males had a median income of $45,920 versus $37,644 for females. The per capita income for the CDP was $30,649. About 1.0% of families and 2.0% of the population were below the poverty line, including 1.3% of those under age 18 and none of those age 65 or over.

== Education ==
Pottsgrove is served by the Pottsgrove School District. Its high school is Pottsgrove High School.

== Notable people ==
- Kendal Conrad - country singer and actress
- Kyle Giersdorf ("Bugha") - professional esports player known for playing Fortnite
- Washington Gladden - congregational pastor and leader of Social Gospel movement
