= Sanatoga Union Sunday School =

- U.S. National Register of Historic Places
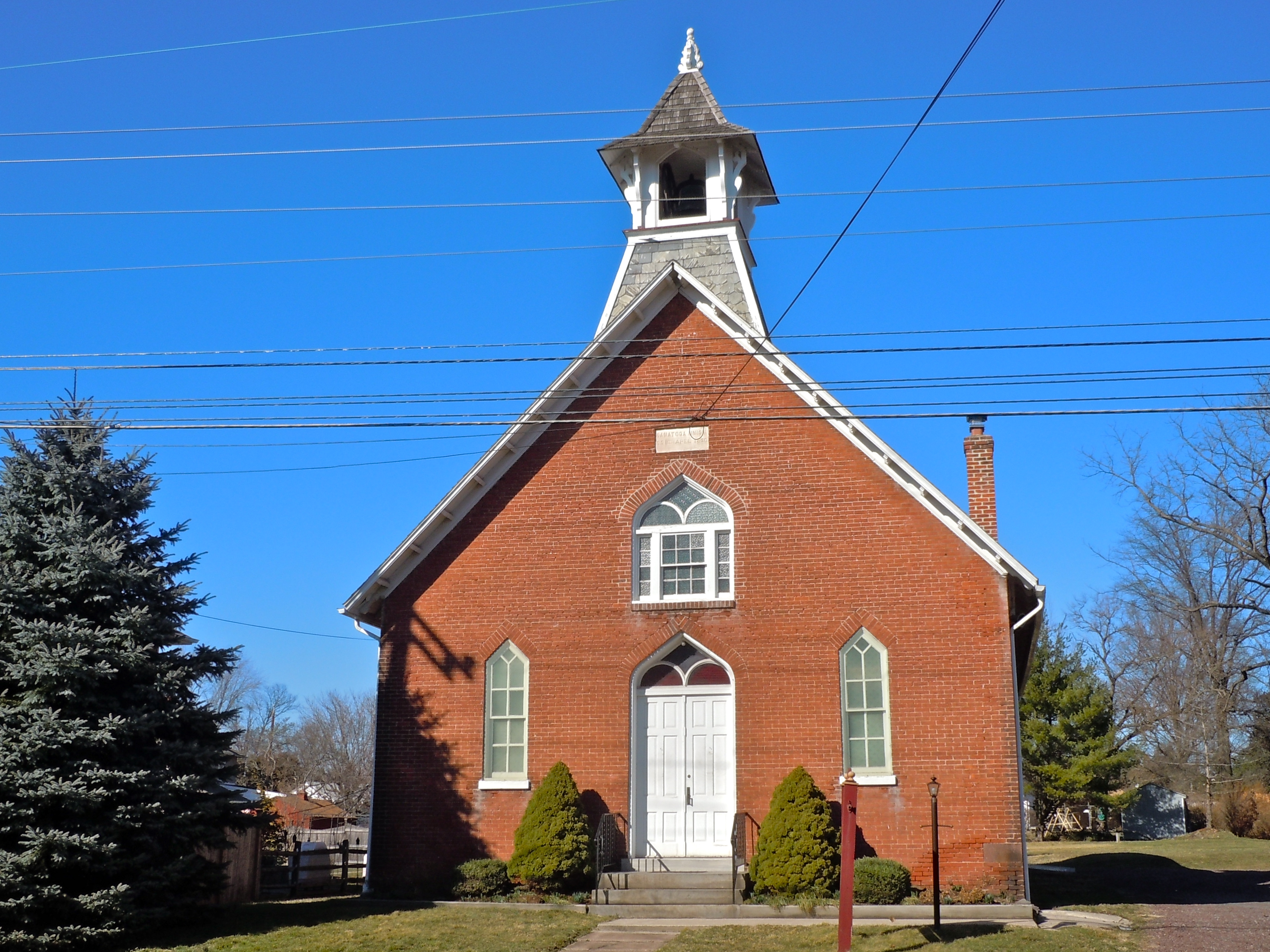

- Location within Pennsylvania Location within the United States
- Nearest city: Lower Pottsgrove Township, Montgomery County, Pennsylvania
- Coordinates: 40°14′42″N 75°35′40″W
- Area: less than one acre
- Built: 1891
- Architectural style: Late Victorian
- NRHP reference No.: 04000805
- Added to NRHP: August 04, 2004

Sanatoga Union Sunday School is a historic church in Lower Pottsgrove Township, Montgomery County, Pennsylvania.

It was built in 1891 as part of the Sunday school movement and added to the National Register of Historic Places in 2004.

== History ==
The Crooked Hill Sunday School first met in a local schoolhouse in 1865. In 1890, when the town of Crooked Hill changed its name to Sanatoga, the Sunday School changed its name as well. About the same time, townsfolk decided to build a separate Sunday School building as well. "Union" in the name signified that children from all Christian denominations, especially Baptist, Lutheran, and Reformed churches, were invited to attend.

Land was donated by Samuel Kurtz, and materials and labor were also donated to build the Sunday School building.
