= Kevin Negandhi =

American sportscaster (born 1975)

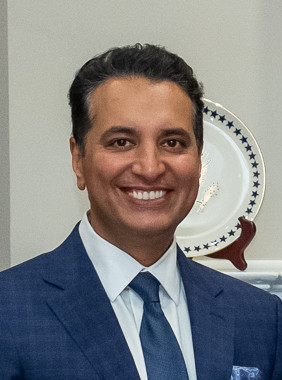
- Negandhi in 2023
- Born: Kevin S. Negandhi; March 20, 1975 (age 51); Philadelphia, Pennsylvania, U.S.
- Education: Temple University (B.A.)
- Occupation: Sportscaster
- Known for: Sportscaster on ESPN and ABC
- Spouse: Monica Buchanan (m. 2009)
- Children: 3

Kevin S. Negandhi (born March 20, 1975) is an American sportscaster for ESPN's SportsCenter as well as College Football on ABC.

In addition to hosting SportsCenter, he also hosts Baseball Tonight, College Football Live and Outside the Lines on ESPN and is a fill-in anchor on NFL Live and First Take. In addition to being a guest-host on Get Up!, he has also hosted the Rose Parade on ABC from 2018-2020. Starting in 2015, Negandhi has hosted the Special Olympic World Games and USA Games on ESPN and ABC. Additionally, he hosted the first ever NBA Draft aired on ABC in 2020. He is the first anchor of Indian-American descent to be on a national sports network in American television history. Negandhi joined ESPN in September 2006 and made his debut on ESPNews in October 2006.

== Biography ==
Negandhi was born in West Philadelphia, Pennsylvania. He graduated from Phoenixville Area High School in 1993. After beginning his freshman year at Syracuse University, he transferred before the 1994 spring semester to Temple University where he earned a Bachelor of Arts in Communications in 1998. While at Temple, he was a reporter on the Philadelphia Inquirer High School Sports Show on Fox. He also worked as a stringer for USA Today covering 6 local colleges for the Gannett News Service. He was also a member of Temple's student run newscast, Temple Update, under the direction of Rick Beardsley. He served as sports editor at the Temple News - the school's newspaper, for two years. Negandhi was the voice of the Temple Women's basketball team on WRTI 90.1 FM in Philadelphia for three years.

After college, he became the second Indian-American to be a local sports anchor in the country, serving as sports anchor and later sports director at KTVO in Kirksville, MO from 1998 to 1999.

Negandhi joined WWSB in Sarasota, Florida in 1999 and served as a sports anchor/reporter for three years. After a year away from TV, he returned to Sarasota and became sports director at WWSB-TV from 2004-06. While working in Florida, he won three Associated Press awards including "Best Sportscast" in 2004 and 2005 and "Best Breaking Sports News" in 2005.

== Personal life ==
Negandhi married fellow newscaster Monica Buchanan in 2009. They have 3 children with two sons, Brandon and Noah, and a daughter, Mckenna. Both sons enjoy collecting sports cards, with a particular interest in Shohei Ohtani, Tyrese Maxey, Mookie Betts and Bryce Harper. Mckenna, despite her young age, also enjoys participating in card breaks with her family according to Topps Ripped.

Negandhi is an avid Philadelphia sports fan, supporting his hometown Eagles, Sixers, Phillies and Flyers.
