= Bishop McDevitt High School (Wyncote, Pennsylvania) =

Location
- 125 Royal Avenue; Wyncote, (Montgomery County), Pennsylvania 19095; United States; 40°5′39″N 75°9′20″W

Information
- Type: Private, coeducational
- Motto: Maria Impende Juvamen (Mary, bestow your aid.)
- Religious affiliation: Roman Catholic
- Established: 1958
- Closed: 2021
- School district: Archdiocese of Philadelphia
- President: Dr. Matthew Powell
- Principal: Patricia Rooney
- Faculty: 25
- Grades: 9-12
- Student to teacher ratio: 21:1
- Colors: Gold (color) and White
- Athletics conference: Philadelphia Catholic League
- Mascot: Royal Lancers
- Team name: Royal Lancers
- Accreditation: Middle States Association of Colleges and Schools
- Newspaper: The Royalist
- Yearbook: The Realm
- Tuition: $7,050 (2016-2017)
- Alumni: 15,560+
- Admissions Director: Megan Gerhard
- Athletic Director: Patrick Manzi
- Website: www.mcdevitths.org

Bishop McDevitt High School was a private, comprehensive, co-educational Roman Catholic high school in the Wyncote community in Cheltenham Township, Pennsylvania, United States. It was located in the Roman Catholic Archdiocese of Philadelphia.

== Background ==
The school served grades nine through twelve with a diverse mix of students with an academic program grounded in the teachings and formations of the Catholic faith.

It was accredited by the Pennsylvania Department of Education, the Middle States Association of Colleges and Schools, and the Archdiocese of Philadelphia.

The faculty consisted of lay and religious men and women, the majority of whom held advanced degrees in their area of specialization.

== History ==
Bishop McDevitt High School was dedicated on December 8, 1958, and opened to students the following day. The school celebrated its first graduating class in June 1961. The school added vocational and technical education in 1965; won Philadelphia Catholic League marching band title in 1965; won its first boys' Philadelphia Catholic League title in 1966; became co-educational shortly after it first opened Ed; won its first girls' Philadelphia Catholic League title in 1979; welcomed its first lay principal in 1985; opened its first computer lab in 1987; achieved its Middle States accreditation in 1988; started a Development Office and Alumni Association in 1989; and moved into open enrollment and a restructured president and principal model of administration in 1993.

The school was closed in 2020, effective at the end of the school year in 2021.

In July 2022, Arcadia University expanded its campus size, purchasing the site of the former Bishop McDevitt High School.

== Notable alumni ==
- Chris Conlin, former All-American football player, Penn State, and former NFL player, Indianapolis Colts and Miami Dolphins
- Jim Curtin, former soccer player and former head coach, Philadelphia Union
- Cindy Griffin, women's head basketball coach, St. Joseph's University
- Frank Rizzo Jr., former member, Philadelphia City Council
- Paul F. Tompkins, American comedian, actor, and writer
