= Kennedy–Kenrick Catholic High School =

Private Catholic school in Norristown, Pennsylvania, US

Location
- 250 East Johnson Highway; Norristown, (Montgomery County), Pennsylvania 19401; United States; 40°7′42″N 75°19′25.25″W

Information
- Type: Private, coeducational
- Motto: "United in Faith, Hope, and Love with Christ Forever"
- Religious affiliation: Roman Catholic
- Established: September 1993
- Closed: June 10, 2010
- School district: Archdiocese of Philadelphia
- President: Alan Okon
- Principal: Janet Purcell
- Grades: 9-12
- Average class size: 20
- Campus type: Suburban
- Colors: Royal blue and athletic gold
- Athletics: Freshman, junior varsity, varsity
- Athletics conference: PIAA
- Mascot: Wally the Wolverine
- Team name: Wolverines
- Accreditation: Middle States Association of Colleges and Schools
- Newspaper: The Current
- Yearbook: Kennections
- Tuition: $4,860 (08-09)
- Admissions: Megan Callen
- Campus Ministry: Daniel McCarthy
- Guidance Director: Louise Eckert
- Athletic Director: Sandy Nadwodny
- Website: http://www.kkchs.org

Kennedy–Kenrick Catholic High School was a private Roman Catholic high school in Norristown, Pennsylvania, United States, in the Roman Catholic Archdiocese of Philadelphia.

== Background ==
Kennedy–Kenrick Catholic High School was established through a merger of Archbishop Kennedy High School in Conshohocken and Bishop Kenrick High School in Norristown, and opened in September 1993. It ultimately served the communities of Andorra, Blue Bell, Conshohocken, Lafayette Hill, Norristown, Roxborough, many parts of eastern and northern Montgomery County, and communities on the Philadelphia/Montgomery County border. Open enrollment, which was established throughout the Philadelphia Archdiocesan School System in September 1993, admitted students from all the Philadelphia and Montgomery County areas.

== Athletics ==
Although Kennedy–Kenrick was a smaller school, their programs were not negatively affected. The field hockey team won the PCL Championships (2008) after knocking out first place rival Archbishop Carroll.

- Fall sports: football, boys' soccer, boys' cross country, golf, field hockey, girls' soccer, volleyball, girls' cross country
- Winter sports: boys' basketball, girls' basketball, wrestling, bowling
- Spring sports: baseball, softball, boys' lacrosse, girls' lacrosse, boys' outdoor track, girls' outdoor track

== Merger ==
On January 28, 2008, the archdiocese announced that a new high school in Upper Providence Township would replace Kennedy–Kenrick and St. Pius X High School in Lower Pottsgrove Township.

The new school, Pope John Paul II High School, is a 209,000-square-foot (19,400 m^{2}) facility. It opened in September 2010.

== The final year ==
The final academic school year for Kennedy–Kenrick started on September 9, 2009. Throughout the year, the faculty and staff created special activities on the 17th of every month, as the 2009–2010 year marked the school's 17th and final year in operation.

The last senior class celebrated its Baccalaureate Liturgy on Monday, June 1, 2010, at Visitation B.V.M. Parish, in Norristown, Pennsylvania.

Graduation for the last senior class of Kennedy–Kenrick, the Class of 2010, took place on Tuesday, June 2, 2010, at Gwynedd-Mercy College.

The official last day of school for current freshmen, sophomores, and juniors was Thursday, June 10, 2010, and was celebrated with a special liturgy celebrating the legacies of the four schools that led to Kennedy–Kenrick.

== Notable alumni ==
- Joe Harvey, former professional baseball player, Colorado Rockies and New York Yankees
- Chris Lubanski, former baseball player, Kansas City Royals
- Christian Walker, professional baseball player, Arizona Diamondbacks
