= Saint Pius X High School (Lower Pottsgrove Township, Pennsylvania) =

Private school in Pennsylvania, United States

Location
- 844 North Keim Street; Pottstown (Lower Pottsgrove Township), (Montgomery County), Pennsylvania 19464; United States
- 40°15′10″N 75°37′8″W

Information
- Type: Private, Coeducational
- Motto: Instaurare Omnia In Christo. (Restore all things in Christ.)
- Religious affiliation: Roman Catholic
- Established: 1953
- Closed: 2010
- School district: Archdiocese of Philadelphia
- President: Fr. Alan Okon
- Principal: Judith Owens
- Grades: 9-12
  - Grade 9: 157
  - Grade 10: 145
  - Grade 11: 103
  - Grade 12: 148
- Student to teacher ratio: 30:1
- Colors: Navy Blue and Gold
- Team name: Winged Lions
- Accreditation: Middle States Association of Colleges and Schools
- Publication: Palestra (literary magazine)
- Newspaper: Sarto Script
- Yearbook: Tiara
- Tuition: $4,620 (2007-08)
- Admissions Director: Meghan Callen
- Athletic Director: Madison Morton
- Website: http://www.stpiusxhs.org

Saint Pius X High School was a private, Roman Catholic high school at 844 North Keim Street in Lower Pottsgrove Township, Pennsylvania, United States, northeast of Pottstown. It was located in the Roman Catholic Archdiocese of Philadelphia.

== Background ==
Saint Pius X High School was established in 1953, moving into the permanent building in 1955. The mascot was a winged lion, the symbol of St. Mark. The Middlestates Association of Colleges and Schools accredited St. Pius X and students attended the school from 10 Catholic grade schools and 19 Catholic parishes along with 10 public school districts.

The school had a capacity of 400, but by 1966 the anticipated number of students was 670, too many students for its designed capacity and about three times its initial enrollment.

In 2008, the archdiocese announced that it will move St. Pius to a new location. On January 28, 2008, the archdiocese announced that a new high school in Upper Providence Township in Montgomery County will replace St. Pius X and Kennedy-Kenrick Catholic High School in Norristown. The new Pope John Paul II High School opened in September 2010. The old building housed Ringing Rocks Elementary School students while their school underwent renovations that were completed in 2012. As of 2023, the former building is now occupied by Saint Aloysius Parish School, a K-8 school within the Archdiocese of Philadelphia.
