= Pottsgrove High School =

Coordinates: 40.2644°N 75.6207°W

Location
- 1345 Kauffman Rd; Pottsgrove, Pennsylvania 19464

Information
- Type: High school
- Established: 1955
- School district: Pottsgrove School District
- Dean: Michael Zacharda
- Principal: Felicia Gonzalez
- Staff: 63.17 (FTE)
- Grades: 9-12
- Enrollment: 986 (2023–2024)
- Student to teacher ratio: 15.61
- Campus type: Suburban
- Colors: Maroon and white
- Mascot: Falcon
- Newspaper: Falcon
- Website: https://hs.pgsd.org/

Pottsgrove High School (PGHS), built in 1955, is a public high school located in Pottsgrove, Pennsylvania that serves students in grades 9-12 from Lower Pottsgrove, Upper Pottsgrove, and West Pottsgrove townships. It is part of the Pottsgrove School District. Pottsgrove High School has a total enrollment of approximately 1,000 students. The school is accredited by the Middle States Association of Colleges and Schools. Pottsgrove's colors are maroon and white and their mascot is the Falcon.

In the summer of 2012, a renovation of the high school began in order to make sure the building functioned appropriately for the 21st century. In addition, some other building needs were: a new roof, security improvements, and compliance of code in air quality and bathrooms. This project was expected to cost approximately $27.95 million.

== Academics ==
=== Citizenship Grade ===
Each subject is accompanied by a citizenship mark based on a pupil's capacity for growth. This mark includes an evaluation of characteristics that are essential to personal and social development: attitude, effort, and dependability. Attitude - spirit of cooperation within the classroom, effort - be attentive, do what is required, and take advantage of the educational opportunities present, dependability - be recognized in the classroom as a responsible person. Each student will receive a grade using the following guidelines:
O = Outstanding
S = Satisfactory
U = Unsatisfactory
F = Cheating/Plagiarism

=== Grading Policy ===
The following grading system is used at Pottsgrove High School:
A = 100-90
B = 89-80
C = 79-70
D = 69-60
F = 59-0

A student's Final Grade in a course is calculated as follows:
Quarter 1 20% +
Quarter 2 20% +
Mid-Term Exam 10% +
Quarter 3 20% +
Quarter 4 20% +
Final Exam 10% =
Final Grade 100%

=== Graduation Project ===
Students in Pottsgrove School District will complete a graduation project which demonstrates their ability to apply, analyze, synthesize, and evaluate information and to communicate significant knowledge and understanding. This project provides the opportunity for in-depth learning of a self-directed topic involving out-of-class research or community service, an oral/written component, and a project presentation.

=== Graduation Requirements ===
Pottsgrove School District, in compliance with the regulations of the State Board of Education has established the following graduation requirements:

- Students must obtain a minimum of 23 credits
- 4 Credits in English and Social Studies
- 3 Credits in Math and Science
- 2 Credits in Arts or Humanities or both
- 1 Credit in Health and Physical Education
- 0.5 Credits in Computer Technology
- 5.5 Credits in other approved courses
- Successful completion of approved Graduation Project

== Extracurricular Activities ==
Pottsgrove High School offers a wide range of clubs and organizations for their students to join. These include: Art Club, Concert Choir, DECA, Environmental Club, German Club, Key Club (Service Club), Marching Band, Maximi (Literary/Arts Publication), National Honor Society, Pottsgrovian Yearbook, Orchestra, Reading Olympics, Science Olympiad, Show Choir, Spanish Club, Student Government, and Video News Team.

== Athletics ==
Pottsgrove High School competes in the Pioneer Athletic Conference (PAC-10). It has teams in cross country, field hockey, football, boys and girls soccer, boys and girls tennis, golf, boys and girls basketball, swimming, wrestling, winter track, baseball, softball, boys and girls lacrosse, Spring boys and girls track, and cheerleading.

== Notable alumni ==
- Jonas Hampton, distance runner
- Rahsul Faison, college football running back for the South Carolina Gamecocks

== See also ==
- Pottsgrove School District
- Pottstown Senior High School
