= Phoenixville Area School District =

School district in Pennsylvania

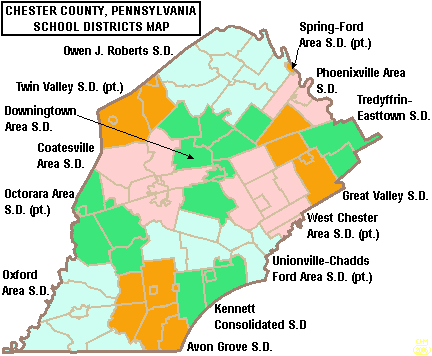
- Map of Chester County, Pennsylvania, public school districts. Phoenixville Area School District is in pink in the northeastern part of the county.

Address
- 386 City Line Avenue Phoenixville, Chester County, Pennsylvania, 19460; United States

District information
- Superintendent: Missy McTiernan

Students and staff
- District mascot: Phantom
- Colors: Purple

Other information
- Website: www.pasd.k12.pa.us

The Phoenixville Area School District (PASD) is a public school district headquartered in Phoenixville, Pennsylvania. The current superintendent is Mrs. Missy McTiernan.

Located in Chester County, PASD serves Phoenixville, East Pikeland Township and Schuylkill Township. The district contains seven schools: Phoenixville Area Early Learning Center, Barkley Elementary, Hares Hill Elementary School, Manavon Elementary, Schuylkill Elementary, Phoenixville Area Middle School, and Phoenixville Area High School. The Phoenixville School District opened Hares Hill Elementary School for the 2025-2026 School Year. The new elementary school is located in East Pikeland Township.

== Litigation ==
Key administrators of the Phoenixville Area School District have been involved in litigation associated with their administrative duties.

=== Former Business Manager ===
On May 17, 2022, Christopher Gehris, 47, Phoenixville, PA, former business manager for the Phoenixville Area School District, was sentenced to one year and two months in prison and three years of supervised release, and was ordered to pay over $94,000 in restitution for embezzling that amount from the Phoenixville Area School District. From 2013 until 2019, Gehris cashed checks made payable to himself and to “cash,” received checks and direct deposits into his personal checking account for “start-up money” for student activities, stole cash from school programs, and obtained gift cards for personal expenditures – all in furtherance of his embezzlement scheme. He also admitted that he hid his thefts by altering receipts and falsifying reports submitted to the Board of School Directors.

=== Current Superintendent ===
Melissa “Missy” McTiernan, the current superintendent, is a defendant in two ongoing lawsuits related to her previous position of Superintendent in the Scranton School District. In the case of Sparacino v. Scranton School District et al, Scranton teacher Jacqueline Sparacino filed a lawsuit against the district, former Superintendent McTiernan, and Northeast Intermediate School Principal Joseph Hanni. She alleges retaliation, discrimination, intentional infliction of emotional distress, and fraud.

In a second lawsuit, Brazil v. Scranton School Board et al, Jeff Brazil, the former Chief Operating Officer of the Scranton School District, claims that Superintendent Melissa McTiernan and former administrator Paul Dougherty pretended to be unaware of the environmental issues to shift the blame away from themselves and persuade the grand jury to indict him.
