= Pope John Paul II High School (Pennsylvania) =

Catholic high school in Upper Providence Township, Pennsylvania

Location
- 181 Rittenhouse Road; Royersford, Montgomery County, Pennsylvania 19468; United States of America; 40°11′53.9″N 75°30′32.2″W

Information
- Type: Private, Coeducational, Alternative
- Motto: Be not afraid to seek the splendor of truth and to live the gospel of life.
- Religious affiliation: Roman Catholic
- Patron saint: Pope John Paul II
- Established: 2010
- School district: Archdiocese of Philadelphia
- President: Stacy Gallagher
- Principal: Kathleen Guyger
- Priest: Rev. Anthony J. Albanese
- Grades: 9-12
- Colors: Blue and Athletic Gold
- Athletics conference: Pac-12
- Mascot: Golden Panther
- Nickname: PJP, PJP II
- Website: pjphs.org

Pope John Paul II High School is a Catholic high school in Upper Providence Township, Montgomery County, Pennsylvania, United States, near Royersford in Montgomery County within the Archdiocese of Philadelphia. The school, named in honor of Pope John Paul II, teaches Catholicism and academic subjects.

== History ==
The school opened in September 2010 as a merger of Kennedy-Kenrick Catholic High School, in Norristown, Pa., and St. Pius X High School, in Lower Pottsgrove Township (Pottstown), Pa., by the Archdiocese of Philadelphia.

== Academics ==
Graduate students need to complete 0.5 art credits, 0.5 technology credits, 1 health and gym credit, 2 language credits (of the same language), 3 mathematics credits, 3 history credits, 3 science credits, 4 ELA credits, 4 Catholic theology credits, and 5 elective credits chosen by the students. To earn 0.5 credits students must pass one semester of a class.

The school offers college courses through Immaculata University.

Languages

Pope John Paul II High School offers 3 languages: French, Spanish, Italian, and Latin for professionals. The school also offers ASL and a full Latin course through the Arrupe Virtual Learning Institute

Levels of Classes

Pope John Paul II High School offers three categories of courses:

College Preparatory - on-level courses

Honors - advanced courses

Advanced Placement - college-level courses

== Religion ==
The school states that it is open to students of all faiths while also giving them materials to learn and deepen their understanding of Catholicism. As a Catholic school, every month it celebrates Mass, and students are offered Mass and Eucharistic adoration during their lunch periods. Students are required to complete 4 years of education in Catholic theology in order to graduate. The school also requires service to the community, which it calls "Christian service". Each year students must complete several hours of service in order to graduate or advance to the next grade.

== Arts ==
The performing arts program, Studio 38, at Pope John Paul II High School is currently headed by Mrs. Marusia Lynn. This department has two major annual performances, the Rhapsodies and the Spring Musicals. The Rhapsodies is a performance by the Pope John Paul II High School Rhapsodies Show Choir in the late fall of each school year. Auditions are open to all students in late spring or early summer. Auditions and practice for the Spring Musical begin in mid to late winter, and the show is performed in early spring. Pope John Paul II High School usually performs a different musical each year. Exceptions are the two performances of both Les Misérables (2011 and 2016) and West Side Story (2014 and 2026), and the two years of Phantom of the Opera, as the first was cut short due to the COVID-19 pandemic.

The school has an art show every year, exhibiting students' paintings, sculptures, and photography.

=== List of Spring Musicals ===
Year	Musical Performed
2011	Les Misérables
2012	Anything Goes
2013	Beauty and the Beast
2014	West Side Story
2015	Mary Poppins
2016	Les Misérables
2017	Crazy for You
2018	Footloose
2019	The King and I
2020	Phantom of the Opera (cancelled)
2021	Phantom of the Oprea
2022	42nd Street
2023	Oklahoma!
2024	Wizard of Oz
2025	Grease
2026	West SIde Story

=== Band ===
The concert band is open to all students that play an instrument and they play at various school events throughout the year. Within the band, there are the subgroups of the Jazz Band, String Ensemble, and Percussion Ensemble. For those who do not know how to play an instrument and are interested in joining the band, the school offers free lessons to their students.

== Athletics ==
PJP offers athletics for their students to participate in. They have fall, winter, and spring sports, with separate teams for the boys and the girls. Each team usually consists of a Junior Varsity and Varsity.

=== Fall sports ===
- Field Hockey
- Football
- Golf
- Soccer
- Girls Tennis
- Volleyball
- Cheer
- Cross Country

=== Winter Sports ===
- Cheer
- Wrestling
- Basketball
- Swimming

=== Spring Sports ===
- Baseball
- Softball
- Track and Field
- Lacrosse
- Boys Tennis
- Flag Football
