= Pottsgrove School District =

School district in Pennsylvania

Address
- 1301 Kauffman Road Pottstown, Pennsylvania, 19464; United States

District information
- Type: Public
- Grades: K–12
- Superintendent: Dr. Gregory Puckett
- NCES District ID: 4219650

Students and staff
- Students: 3,071
- Teachers: 233.3 (FTE)
- Staff: 225.7 (FTE)
- Student–teacher ratio: 13.16

Other information
- Website: www.pgsd.org

Pottsgrove School District is a school district headquartered in Lower Pottsgrove Township, Pennsylvania, United States. The district serves Lower Pottsgrove Township, Upper Pottsgrove Township, and West Pottsgrove Township.

== Schools ==
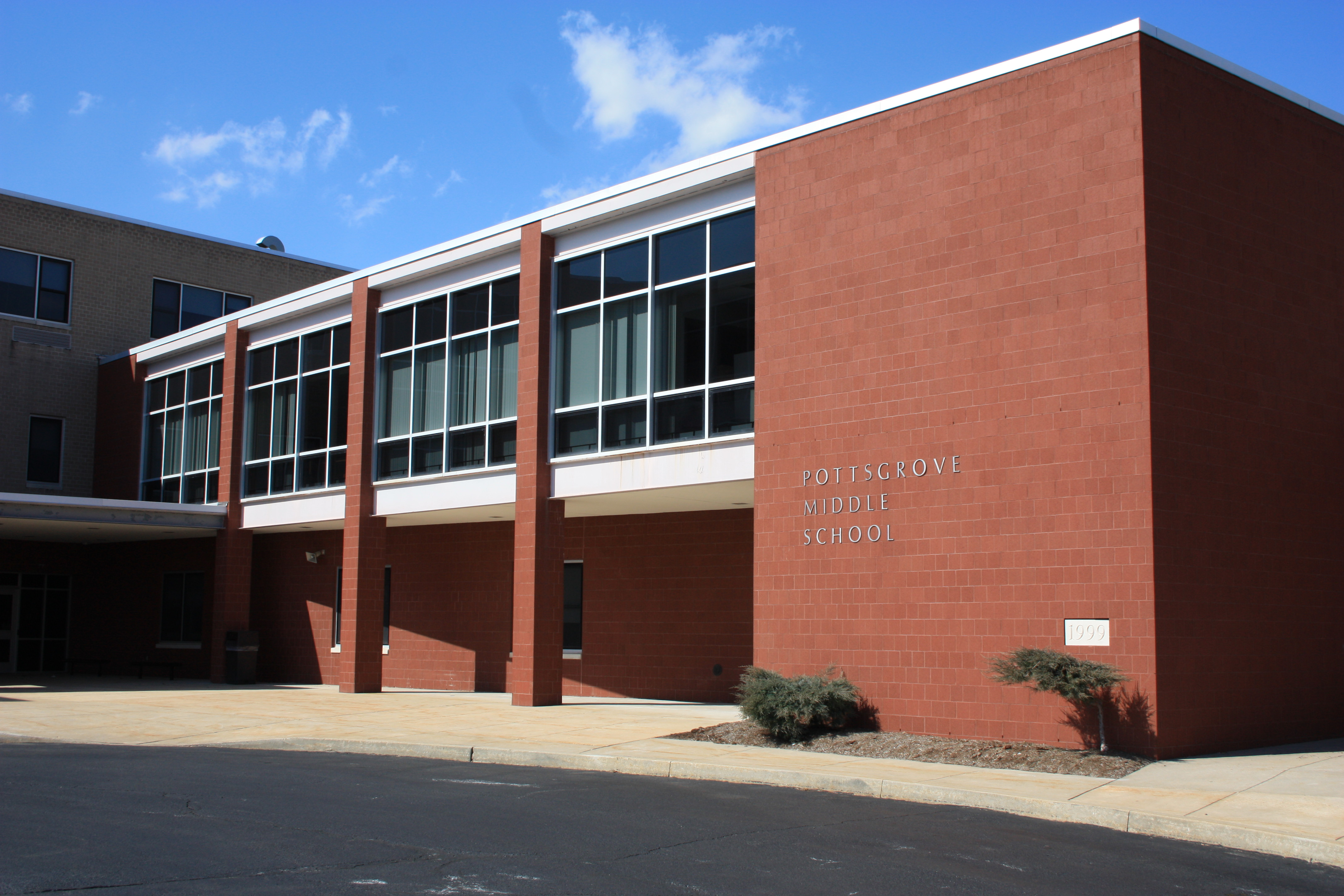
Pottsgrove Middle School

- West Pottsgrove Elementary School (K-2) is in West Pottsgrove Township
- Ringing Rocks Elementary School (K-2) is in Lower Pottsgrove Township
- Lower Pottsgrove Elementary School (3–5) is in Lower Pottsgrove Township
- Pottsgrove Middle School (6–8) is in Upper Pottsgrove Township
- Pottsgrove High School (9–12) is in Lower Pottsgrove Township.

In February 2012 the district passed a vote to rearrange the elementary schools from three K-5 schools into two K-2 schools and one 3-5 school.
