= Lower Pottsgrove Township, Pennsylvania =

Township in Pennsylvania, US

Lower Pottsgrove Township
- Township
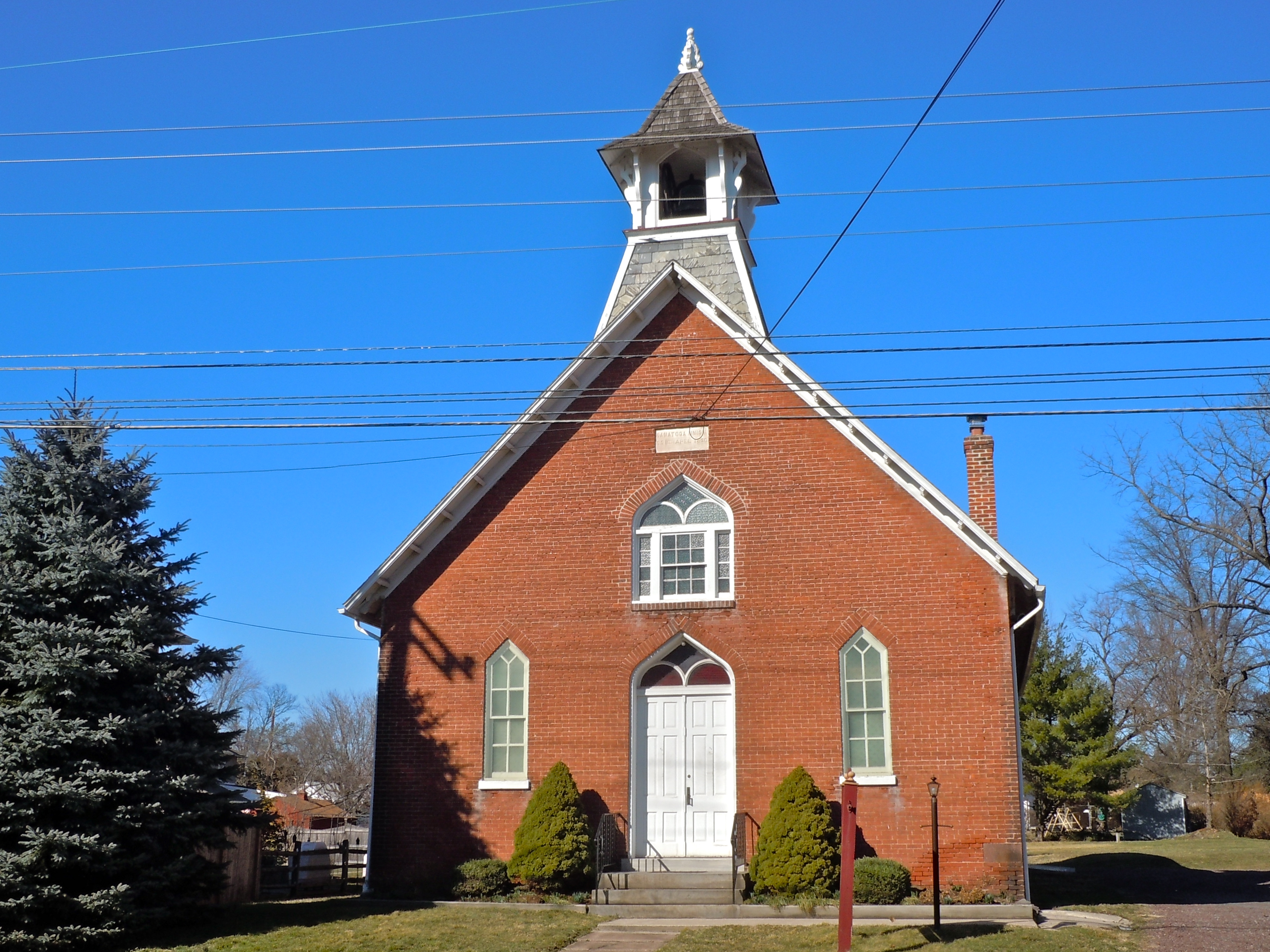
- Former Sanatoga Union Sunday School building

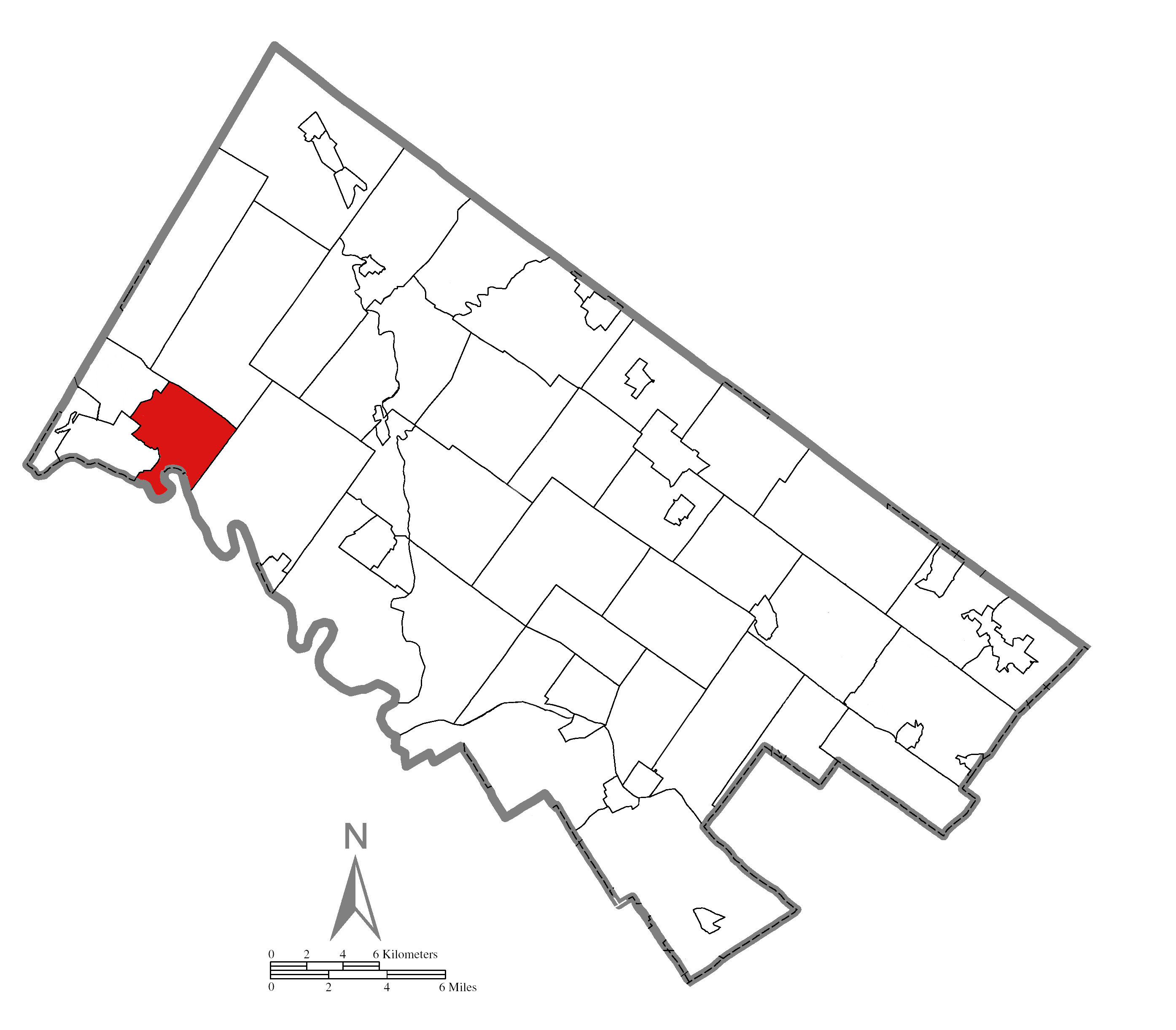
- Location of Lower Pottsgrove Township in Montgomery County

- Location of PA in the United States
- Coordinates: 40°15′32″N 75°35′17″W
- Country: United States
- State: Pennsylvania
- County: Montgomery

Area
  - Total: 8.03 sq mi (20.81 km^{2})
  - Land: 7.92 sq mi (20.50 km^{2})
  - Water: 0.12 sq mi (0.31 km^{2})
- Elevation: 341 ft (104 m)

Population (2010)
  - Total: 12,059
  - Estimate (2016): 12,164
  - Density: 1,536.8/sq mi (593.36/km^{2})
- Time zone: UTC-5 (EST)
  - Summer (DST): UTC-4 (EDT)
- Area code: 610
- Website: www.lowerpottsgrove.org

Lower Pottsgrove Township is a township in Montgomery County, Pennsylvania, United States, approximately 30 miles (51 kilometers) northwest of Philadelphia and 18 miles (30 kilometers) southeast of Reading, along the Schuylkill River. The population was 12,059 at the 2010 census.

== History ==
The name "Pottsgrove" originated from the 18th century estate of John Potts, who built a stone mansion in Stowe (now in West Pottsgrove Township). After the American Revolution's Battle of Brandywine in 1777, part of the Potts Estate became an encampment for George Washington's troops. The encampment, known as Camp Pottsgrove, lasted about two weeks until Washington's troops moved on to the battle of Germantown. The name Camp Pottsgrove stayed even after the troops moved out.

Pottsgrove Township was formed on August 20, 1806, from portions of Douglass and New Hanover Townships. Pottsgrove Township was divided into Lower Pottsgrove and Upper Pottsgrove Townships on December 2, 1889. In 1899, the General Assembly passed a law grouping townships into two classes. At this time, Lower Pottsgrove Township became a township of the second class. Following its split from Upper Pottsgrove, Lower Pottsgrove Township experienced several annexations of territory from the neighboring Pottstown Borough. On January 16, 1931, the Borough of Pottstown annexed two portions of Lower Pottsgrove Township: from Moser to Porter Road and an area bounded by Prospect to Mervine and Adams to Charlotte Streets because Pottstown believed "the township had been taking tax money for years and giving nothing in return." In 1942, Pottstown annexed a little more than five acres bounded by North Hills Boulevard, Mulberry Street and Keim Street.

In November 1953, the voters of Lower Pottsgrove Township supported the Township becoming a first-class Township for the primary purpose of preventing further annexation by the Borough of Pottstown. Lower Pottsgrove Township became a first-class township on January 7, 1954.

The Sanatoga Union Sunday School and Sunnybrook are listed on the National Register of Historic Places.

== Geography ==
According to the United States Census Bureau, the township has a total area of 8.0 square miles (20.8 km^{2}), of which 7.9 square miles (20.5 km^{2}) is land and 0.1 square mile (0.3 km^{2}) (1.50%) is water. It is drained by the Schuylkill River, which separates it from Chester County. The township includes the Pottsgrove CDP and Sanatoga CDP.

=== Climate ===
The township's hardiness zone is 7a. Most of Lower Pottsgrove has a hot-summer humid continental climate (Dfa) except near the river where the climate is humid subtropical (Cfa) like most of Pottstown.

=== Neighboring municipalities ===
- Pottstown (west)
- Upper Pottsgrove Township (northwest)
- New Hanover Township (northeast)
- Limerick Township (southeast)
- East Coventry Township, Chester County (south)

== Demographics ==
Historical population
Census	Pop.	Note	%±
1930	1,225		—
1940	1,226		0.1%
1950	3,389		176.4%
1960	3,824		12.8%
1970	5,157		34.9%
1980	7,319		41.9%
1990	8,808		20.3%
2000	11,213		27.3%
2010	12,059		7.5%
2020	12,217		1.3%

As of the 2010 census, the township was 85.3% White, 10.1% Black or African American, 0.1% Native American, 1.6% Asian, 0.1% Native Hawaiian, and 2.4% were two or more races. 2.7% of the population were of Hispanic or Latino ancestry.

As of the census of 2000, there were 11,213 people, 4,015 households, and 3,091 families residing in the township. The population density was 1,420.2 inhabitants per square mile (548.3/km^{2}). There were 4,127 housing units at an average density of 522.7 per square mile (201.8/km^{2}). The racial makeup of the township was 89.22% White, 8.21% African American, 0.11% Native American, 0.90% Asian, 0.04% Pacific Islander, 0.26% from other races, and 1.27% from two or more races. Hispanic or Latino of any race were 1.22% of the population.

There were 4,015 households, out of which 39.8% had children under the age of 18 living with them, 62.6% were married couples living together, 11.2% had a female householder with no husband present, and 23.0% were non-families. 18.8% of all households were made up of individuals, and 8.1% had someone living alone who was 65 years of age or older. The average household size was 2.75 and the average family size was 3.14.

In the township the population was spread out, with 28.9% under the age of 18, 5.9% from 18 to 24, 31.4% from 25 to 44, 21.9% from 45 to 64, and 11.9% who were 65 years of age or older. The median age was 36 years. For every 100 females there were 94.0 males. For every 100 females age 18 and over, there were 87.9 males.

The median income for a household in the township was $52,100, and the median income for a family was $61,774. Males had a median income of $45,476 versus $32,445 for females. The per capita income for the township was $23,958. About 6.8% of families and 7.7% of the population were below the poverty line, including 12.2% of those under age 18 and 5.4% of those age 65 or over.

== Government and politics ==
Presidential elections results
Year	Republican	Democratic
2020	46.9% 3,285	51.3% 3,595
2016	48.9% 2,792	46.1% 2,634
2012	48.5% 2,731	50.3% 2,836
2008	44.3% 2,565	54.7% 3,169
2004	52.7% 2,720	46.9% 2,423
2000	53.3% 2,110	43.7% 1,729
1996	46.2% 1,560	40.2% 1,357
1992	42.1% 743	31.9% 564

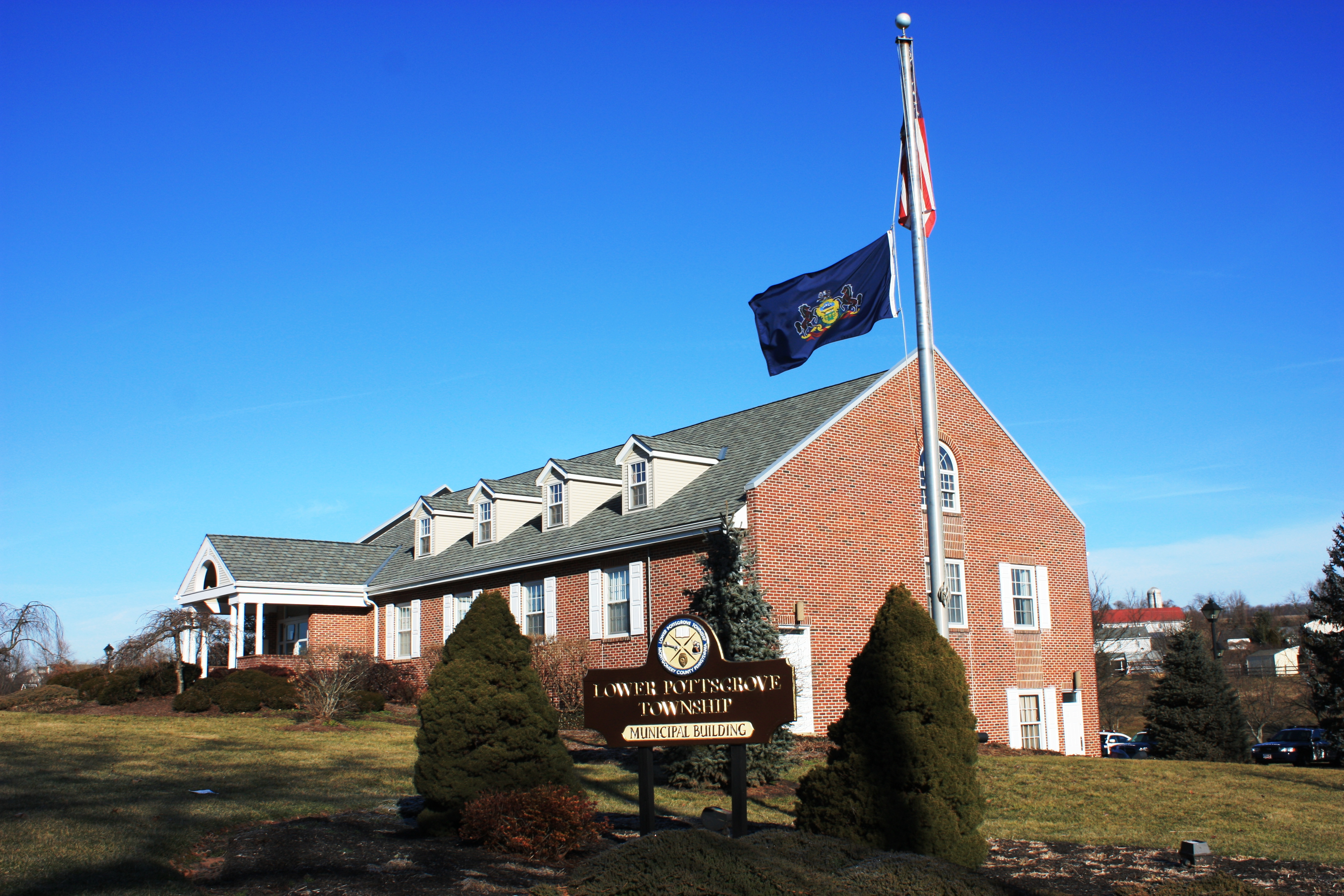
Lower Pottsgrove Township Building

Lower Pottsgrove is a council-manager government with a Township Manager and a five-member Board of Commissioners who are elected at large for four-year staggered terms.

=== Elected Officials ===
==== Board of Commissioners ====
- Raymond W. Lopez, President
- Earl E. Swavely Jr., Vice President
- Bill Keohane
- Robert Mohollen
- Michael J. McGroarty

===== Treasurer / Tax Collector =====
Jennifer Marsteller

===== Volunteer Boards appointed by the Board of Commissioners =====
- Lower Pottsgrove Township Authority
- Zoning Hearing Board
- Planning Commission
- Parks and Recreation Board
- Civil Service Commission

==== Congressional Representatives ====
- PA 4th Congressional District: Representative Madeleine Dean
- 146th State House District: Representative Joe Ciresi
- 24th State Senate District: Senator Tracy Pennycuick

== Transportation ==
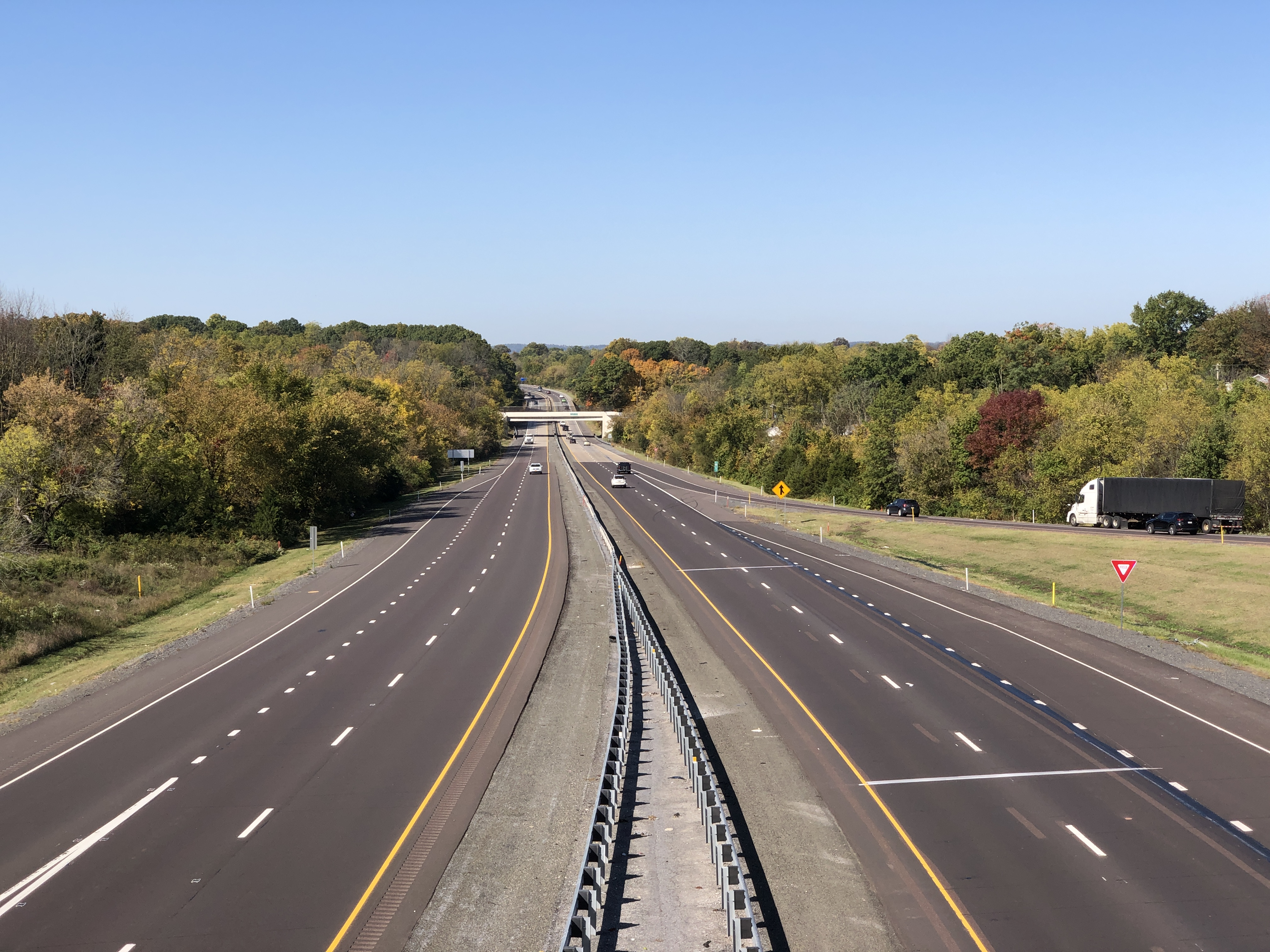
US 422 westbound in Lower Pottsgrove Township

As of 2018 there were 55.80 miles (89.80 km) of public roads in Lower Pottsgrove Township, of which 19.46 miles (31.32 km) were maintained by the Pennsylvania Department of Transportation (PennDOT) and 36.34 miles (58.48 km) were maintained by the township.

The primary highway serving Lower Pottsgrove Township is U.S. Route 422, which follows the Pottstown Expressway along an east–west alignment across the southern portion of the township. Pennsylvania Route 663 also traverses the township, following North Charlotte Street along a northeast–southwest alignment across the northwest corner of the township.

Pottstown Area Rapid Transit (PART) provides bus service to Lower Pottsgrove Township, with the Blue, Purple, and Yellow lines serving points of interest in the township and providing service to Pottstown. SEPTA provides Suburban Bus service to Lower Pottsgrove Township along Route 93, which runs between the Norristown Transportation Center in Norristown and Pottstown.

== Parks and Recreation ==
Lower Pottsgrove's parks have a rich history that deeply impacted its cultural development. More than half of Lower Pottsgrove Township's 220 acres of parks are preserved as open space and natural areas. The Township also offers trails, baseball fields, soccer fields, basketball courts, playground areas, and a band shell for active recreational uses.

=== Ringing Rocks Park ===
The area considered Ringing Rocks is owned by both the Ringing Hill Fire Company and Lower Pottsgrove Township and is renowned for its fields of ringing rocks. The boulders range in size from three pounds to an estimated 25 tons and are igneous plutonic or intrusion rocks, which are formed by molten magma that solidifies underground before it reaches the surface of the earth. These granite rocks, like many other boulder fields in the area, have been exposed by erosion.

In the late 19th, early 20th Century, Ringing Rocks Park was an amusement park owned by the Pottstown Passenger Railway Company. The park contained a carousel; a menagerie with lions, tigers, bears, alligators, and other native wildlife; an observation tower; a spring-fed swimming pond; and a 4,000 foot-long roller coaster. The Pottstown Passenger Railway Company operated a trolley between 1893 and 1937 that served area residents.

Today, the portion of the park owned by the Ringing Hill Fire Company hosts the Fire Company and recreational amenities such as a skating rink, picnic tables and a softball diamond. The portion of the park owned by Lower Pottsgrove Township (approximately 40 acres) is passive open space with a trail system.

=== Sanatoga Park ===
The 54-acre Sanatoga Park currently hosts the man-made Sanatoga Lake, a bandshell, pavilion, playground, soccer field and baseball field. The Pottstown Passenger Railway Company also owned and operated Sanatoga Park, a stop on its trolley line. Sanatoga Park included boat rides, picnic areas, and a natural pathway around Sanatoga Lake. Other amusements included, a swimming pool with a natural sandy bottom, a restaurant, playgrounds, a carousel, a restaurant and a pavilion that hosted concerts. The Alpine Dips roller coaster was the first ride of its kind built in an amusement park. The football/baseball field at Sanatoga Park was where the young Bobby Shantz got his start. Starting in 1939, the park hosted the Sanatoga Speedway, a one-fifth mile flat dirt track from 35 to 38 feet wide, with an area of 4,100 square yards. After the first race, the track was paved due to an enormous dust problem. The Speedway, which was promoted by George Marshman, drew large crowds for a variety of Midget and Stock car races. A 1/2 mile paved Drag Strip was near completion when the track was closed on September 12, 1958. Some of the track can still be seen today. Lower Pottsgrove Township purchased the park in 1965.

=== Gerald Richards Park ===
The 30-acre Gerald Richards Park is the center of Lower Pottsgrove Township's active recreation facilities. It hosts most of the baseball and soccer facilities in the Township. In addition, it includes amenities such as a snack bar, basketball courts, a half-mile fitness trail, and a playground.

=== Other Township Parks ===
Other parks owned by Lower Pottsgrove Township include:

- Alfred B. Miles Park (8.9 acres) – Picnic tables and unpaved trail
- Crimson Lane Park (0.7 acres) – Open space
- Keim Street Open Space (0.2 acres) – Gazebo and garden
- Liberty Hill Open Space (0.3 acres) – Open space
- Pleasantview Park (17.9 acres) – Open space
- Pruss Hill Barn (0.8 acres) – Barn and open space
- Schuylkill River Park (12.3 acres) – Open space, unpaved trails
- Snell and Norton Park (32.1 acres) – Open space
- Sprogels Run Park (22.2 acres) – Open space, unpaved trails

== Education ==
Pottsgrove School District serves Lower Pottsgrove.

Coventry Christian Schools is a Christian school located in Lower Pottsgrove.

Saint Pius X High School of the Roman Catholic Archdiocese of Philadelphia was previously located in Lower Pottsgrove Township. The Saint Pius X High School is now utilized by the Saint Aloysius Elementary School as of September 11, 2017.
