= Upper Merion Area School District =

School district in Pennsylvania, US

The Upper Merion Area School District provides education to Upper Merion Township, Bridgeport, and West Conshohocken in Montgomery County, Pennsylvania. It consists of seven schools.

== Schools ==
- Upper Merion Area High School (grades 9-12)
- Upper Merion Area Middle School (grades 5-8)
- Bridgeport Elementary School (grades K-4)
- Caley Elementary School (grades K-4)
- Candlebrook Elementary School (grades K-4)
- Gulph Elementary School (grades K-4)
- Roberts Elementary School (grades K-4)

The mascot for the Upper Merion Area Middle School and High School is the Viking. School colors are Gold and Navy Blue. The mascot for Caley Elementary School is the Cougar. The mascot for Roberts Elementary School is the Raccoon. The mascot for Candlebrook Elementary school is the Cub. The mascot for Bridgeport Elementary school is the Bear. The mascot for Gulph Elementary School is the Gator. A new middle school was completed in 2006 (and even visited by former president, Barack Obama), as part of the district's plan to replace most school buildings. All five Elementary Schools have been built or rebuilt since 2000.

== Governance ==
In September 1999 the district began a voluntary school uniform pilot program at Roberts Elementary, but superintendent Terry Mancini stated that due to a new principal starting that year, it would be unlikely to be widely adhered to.

The district is governed by a nine-member Board of Directors elected to four-year terms. Since the late 1960s, the district is one of only two in Montgomery County (along with Spring-Ford School District) to have board members elected by region. The district has three regions with two members from each region while three at-large members fill out the remainder of the board. The political breakdown as of December 2017 is 8 Democrats and 1 Republican.
