= Shea's Hippodrome Theatre =

Coordinates: 42.8896°N 78.8739°W

Shea's Hippodrome Theatre was a movie house that opened in 1914 in Buffalo, New York. It was renamed the Center Theater, following a renovation in 1951. In 1983, the theater closed and the building was demolished.

== Early years ==
Shea's Hippodrome Theatre was designed by architect, Leon H. Lempert Jr. and constructed in 1914. It was located at 580 Main Street in downtown Buffalo now known as "Theatre Historic District". The theater was entertainment mogul, Michael Shea's first movie house in Buffalo with 2,800 seats and a staff of nearly 100 employees. It was a state-of-the-art facility for its time and was designed and furnished with little concern for expense. Shea's Hippodrome Theatre was praised for the convenience and comfort it provided for its patrons.

A custom pipe organ was designed and installed in 1922 by The Rudolph Wurlitzer Co., model: Opus 585. In 1957, the organ was sold and changed owners several times in the ensuing decades. In 2005, the organ was purchased and restored by the Theater Organ Society of the Delaware Valley, Inc. for installation in the Colonial Theatre in Phoenixville, Pennsylvania and is currently operational.

== Renovation ==
In 1951, in an effort to modernize the facility, Shea's Hippodrome Theatre underwent a major renovation designed by architect Michael J. DeAngelis. The original marquee was replaced with modern signage and the building was renamed the "Center Theater", after being sold by Shea to Paramount decades earlier. Possibly by design, many of the original architectural details were unable to be seen, due to the darkness of the renovated interior spaces. It remained a movie theater until it closed in 1983.

== Shea's Performing Arts Center ==
Shea's Performing Arts Center is located in Buffalo's Theatre Historic District and is comprised 3 theaters in close proximity to each other on Main Street, where Shea's Hippodrome Theatre once stood. The three theatres are: Shea's Buffalo Theatre, Shea's Smith Theatre, and Shea's 710 Theatre.
