= Peter Urscheler =

Mayor of Phoenixville, Pennsylvania (born 1983)

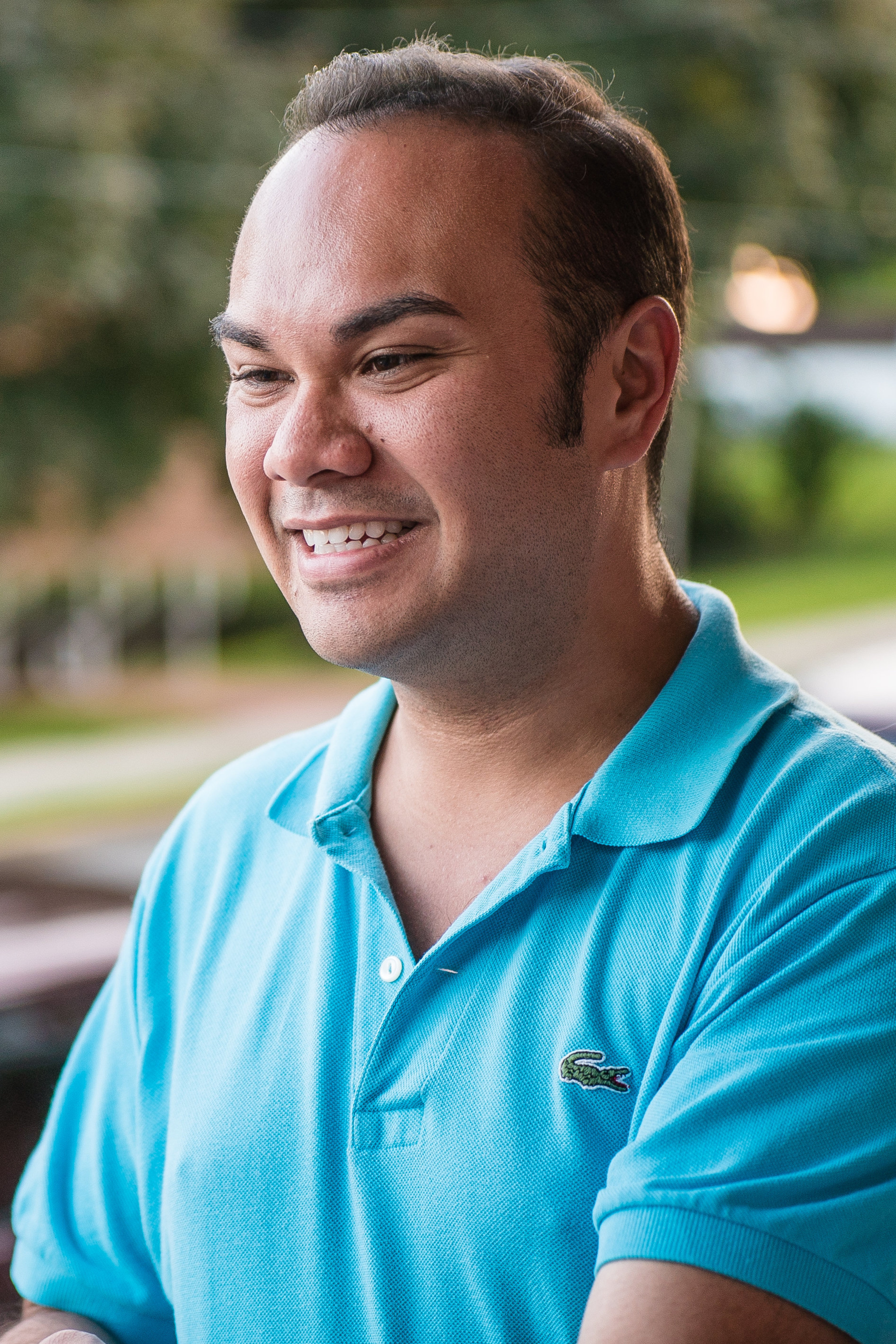

Mayor of Phoenixville, Pennsylvania
- Incumbent
- Assumed office January 2, 2018
- Preceded by: Michael Speck

Personal details
- Born: August 30, 1983 (age 43) Leesburg, Florida, U.S.
- Education: Stetson University (BBA); University of Pennsylvania (MPA)
- Website: phoenixville.org/272/Office-of-the-Mayor

Peter Julian Urscheler (born August 30, 1983) is an American politician and community leader who has served as the Mayor of Phoenixville, Pennsylvania, since January 2, 2018. He is the youngest person to serve in the role and is known for promoting inclusive, nonpartisan community leadership. He has served as Chair of the Chester County Democratic Committee since 2026.

== Early life and education ==
Urscheler was born in Leesburg, Florida, and raised in Tavares. His mother, Norma Bonuel Urscheler, was a Filipina nurse and medical researcher who worked with pioneering heart specialists John Heysham Gibbon, inventor of the heart-lung machine, and Michael DeBakey, a trailblazer in cardiovascular surgery. His father, Emil Urscheler, was a Swiss-born professional footballer and master carpenter from St. Gallen, Switzerland, who played for clubs including FC St. Gallen and Servette FC. Emil worked across Africa and Asia before settling in Australia, where he met Norma. The family frequently traveled to Switzerland and the Philippines, which Urscheler credits with instilling a deep appreciation for cultural diversity.

Urscheler attended Tavares High School and served three terms as class president. He earned a Bachelor of Business Administration from Stetson University with majors in Marketing and Management Information Systems. He served as the youngest-ever Student Government Vice President, and then two terms as President. While at Stetson, he co-led the “Faces of FRAG” campaign to increase funding for the Florida Resident Access Grant (FRAG), helping secure over $17 million in student aid. He was inducted into Beta Gamma Sigma honor society in 2010.

Urscheler later earned a Master of Public Administration from the Fels Institute of Government at the University of Pennsylvania. As a member of the 2026 graduating class, he delivered remarks at the institute's commencement ceremony on public service and democratic responsibility, closing with the line, “history is not something we inherit. We the people... are invited to carry it forward.”

== Career ==
=== Private sector ===
After graduating from college, Urscheler began his career at SEI Investments Company in Oaks, Pennsylvania, working in technology, including extended assignments in London. He eventually became Director of Communications for a major business unit.

=== Community involvement ===
In 2012, while Urscheler's parents were visiting him in Phoenixville for Christmas, his mother was diagnosed with stomach cancer. He became her primary caregiver and asked his parents to remain with him during her treatment. After her death in February 2014, Urscheler invited his father, Emil, to continue living with him in Phoenixville. Inspired by his mother's life and the impact she had on those around her, Urscheler left his corporate career to focus on family and community. He established a local communications consulting firm and became actively involved in civic organizations. He served as president of the Phoenixville Jaycees and later as president of the Pennsylvania Jaycees. Urscheler has also been a longtime volunteer with Hugh O'Brian Youth Leadership Foundation (HOBY) for Eastern Pennsylvania.

== Mayor of Phoenixville ==
Urscheler was elected mayor in 2017 at age 34. He was sworn in on January 2, 2018, with his father present; Emil Urscheler died, in his sleep, later that night.

As mayor, Urscheler oversees a 31-member police force and serves a borough of more than 20,000 residents. His administration has focused on issues including affordable housing, environmental sustainability, educational equity, and LGBTQ nondiscrimination protections.

Under Mayor Urscheler's leadership, Phoenixville has expanded its sustainability efforts. The borough was the first municipality in Pennsylvania to commit to transitioning to 100% clean and renewable energy by 2035, a pledge made shortly before the start of his administration. In 2022, the borough launched PXVNEO, a groundbreaking project to upgrade its wastewater treatment plant with hydrothermal carbonization (HTC) technology. This facility is the first municipally owned HTC plant in North America and aims to transform organic waste into renewable energy and other beneficial byproducts, effectively turning the plant from the borough's largest energy consumer into a potential energy producer. The HTC process not only reduces greenhouse gas emissions but also produces hydrochar, which can be used as a clean fuel or soil amendment, contributing to the borough's sustainability goals.

He was appointed to the Pennsylvania Election Law Advisory Board in 2020 by Governor Tom Wolf.

During the COVID-19 pandemic, Urscheler played a role in local relief efforts, supporting food distribution initiatives and advocating for outdoor dining solutions.

In September 2021, Hurricane Ida caused historic flooding in the Phoenixville area, leading to significant damage in neighboring communities such as Mont Clare. Urscheler, along with his Director of Emergency Management, coordinated relief efforts by mobilizing borough resources and collaborating with local nonprofits to provide aid to affected residents. He emphasized the importance of community solidarity, stating, "A bridge should not stop people from getting resources," highlighting the borough's commitment to assisting neighboring areas across the Schuylkill River. Urscheler also participated in community discussions with Representative Chrissy Houlahan and local leaders to assess the damage and coordinate federal assistance.

Urscheler played a key role in the formation of the Schuylkill River Passenger Rail Authority (SRPRA), which aims to restore passenger rail service between Reading and Philadelphia. He was instrumental in initiating the Mayor’s Task Force on Rail Restoration in Phoenixville in 2018, which laid the groundwork for the SRPRA. Urscheler serves as a founding member and treasurer of the authority.

In 2022, Urscheler was appointed Legislative Committee Co-Chair on the Pennsylvania Municipal League (PML) Board of Directors. In this role, he acts as a spokesperson on League policy, reports pending legislation to the Board, coordinates lobbying and media affairs, and represents the League at public hearings.

== Honors and recognition ==
- Ten Outstanding Young Americans, 2019 – JCI USA
- Outstanding Young Alumni, 2019 – Stetson University
- VISTA Millennial Superstar, 2020 – Vista Today
- BSA VISTA Leadership Megastar, 2024 – Boy Scouts of America
- Outstanding Foreign Worker in Government Service, 2019 – Team United Maharlika Foundation
- Merit Award, 2015 – Phoenixville Regional Chamber of Commerce

== Personal life ==
Urscheler lives in downtown Phoenixville with his two dogs, Ian and Ina. He serves on the boards of the Phoenixville Area Senior Center and the Schuylkill River Heritage Center.
