= Colonial Theatre (Phoenixville, Pennsylvania) =

Theater and movie theater in Phoenixville, Pennsylvania

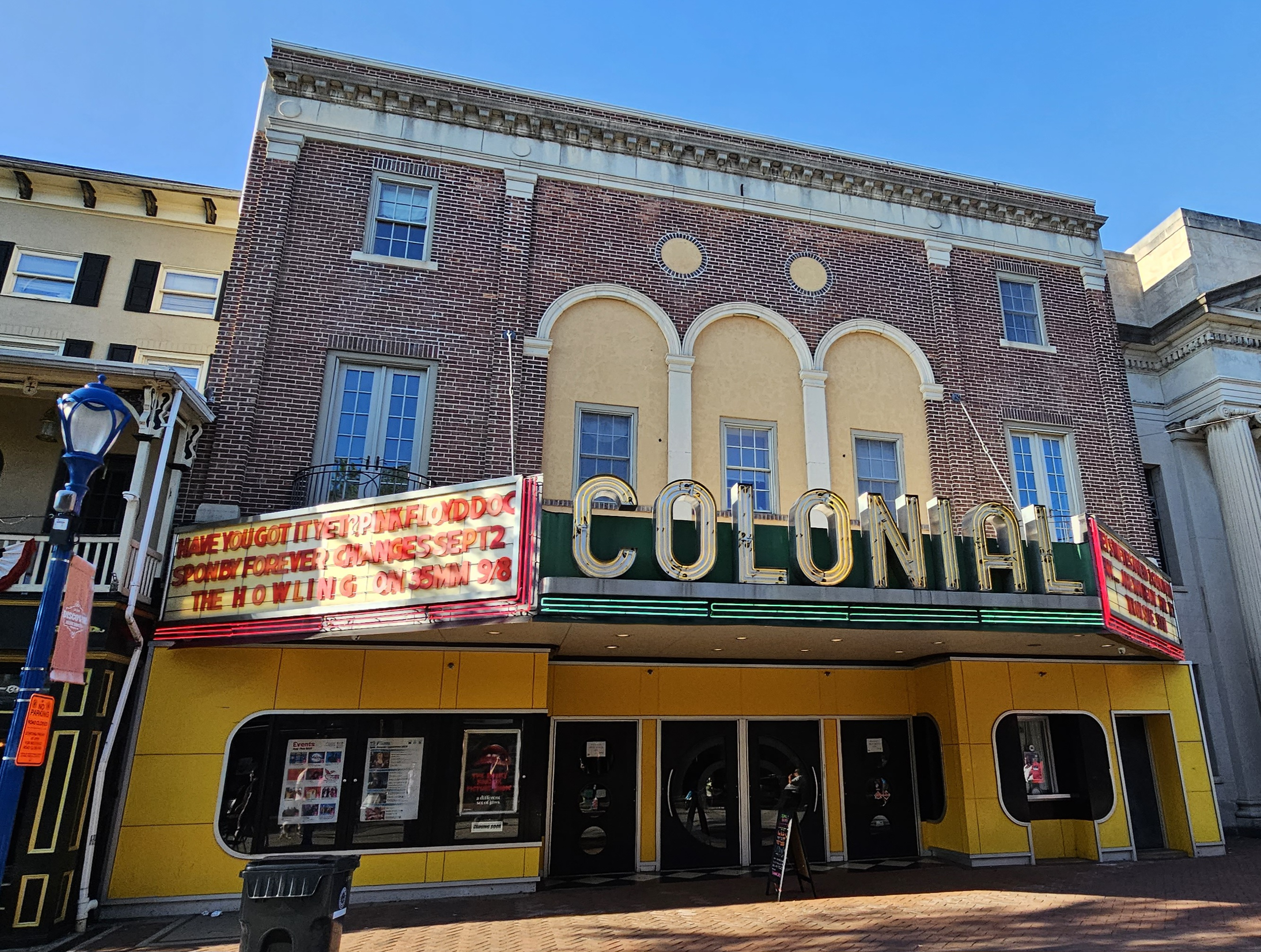
- The Colonial Theatre in 2023
- Interactive map of the Colonial Theatre area

General information
- Type: Theater
- Location: 227 Bridge Street, Phoenixville, Pennsylvania, United States
- Coordinates: 40.1341°N 75.5175°W

The Colonial Theatre is located in Phoenixville, Pennsylvania, at 227 Bridge Street. Built in 1903, the "Colonial Opera House" became a preeminent venue for movies, traveling shows and live entertainment throughout the 20th century. The three-screen venue consists of the original 658-seat ‘vaudeville house’ and two newer additional theatres in the adjacent National Bank of Phoenixville building.

== History ==
Originating as a Beaux-Arts style renovation by architect, Harry Brownback in 1903, the Colonial Theatre was first home to traveling vaudeville acts, live stage shows and musicals. The first stage show, "The Beauty Doctor", debuted in 1903 starring, Fred E. Wright. In 1915, Mary Pickford visited the theatre, and Harry Houdini held a performance, freeing himself from a safe in 1917. Silent films, usually accompanied by a live piano, were shown at the theatre from 1903 until 1928, when The Jazz Singer, the first "talkie" debuted.

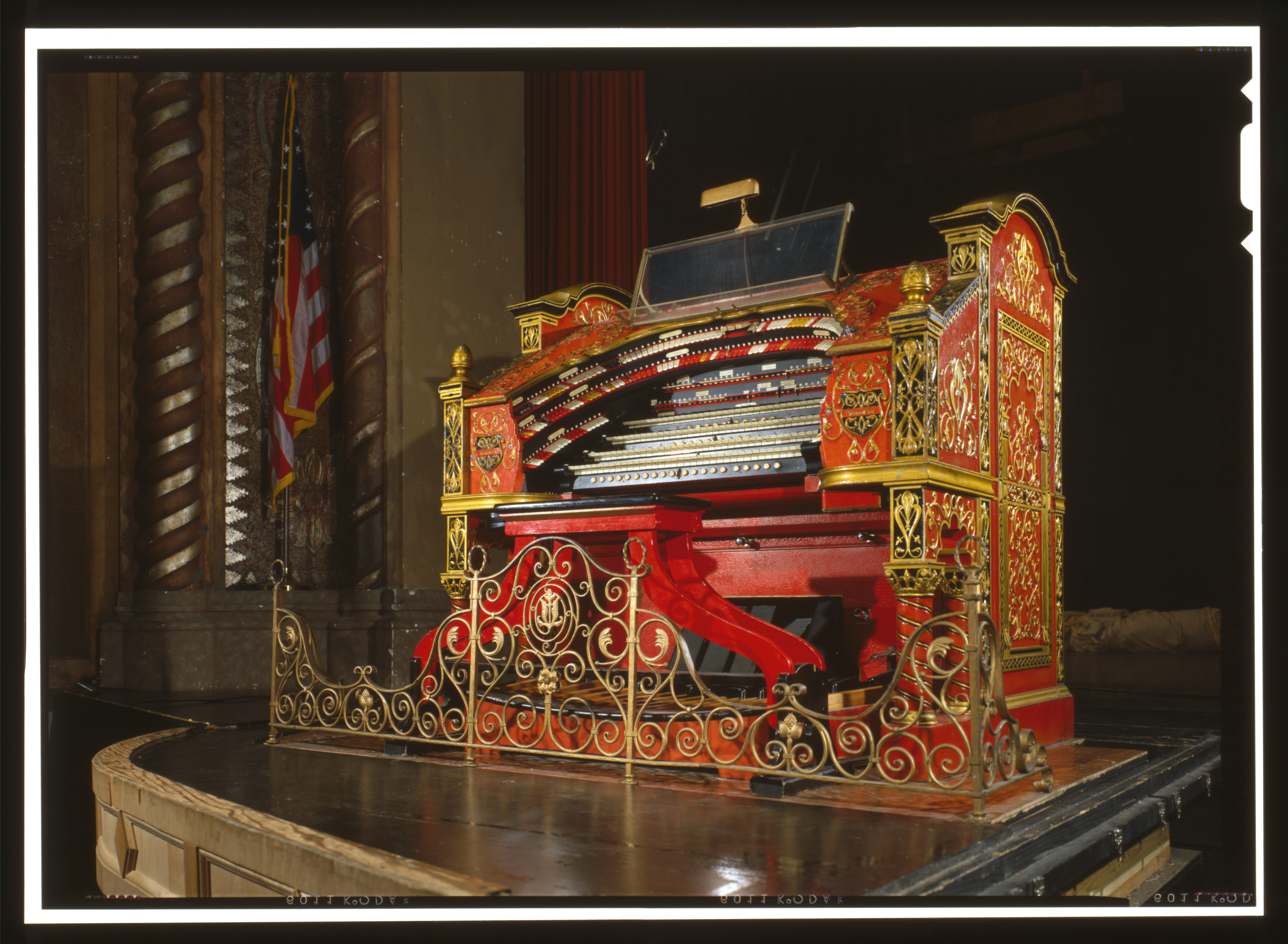
The Colonial's current organ (Wurlitzer Opus 585) which debuted in 2012. It is similar to the theatre's original organ.

=== Pipe organs ===
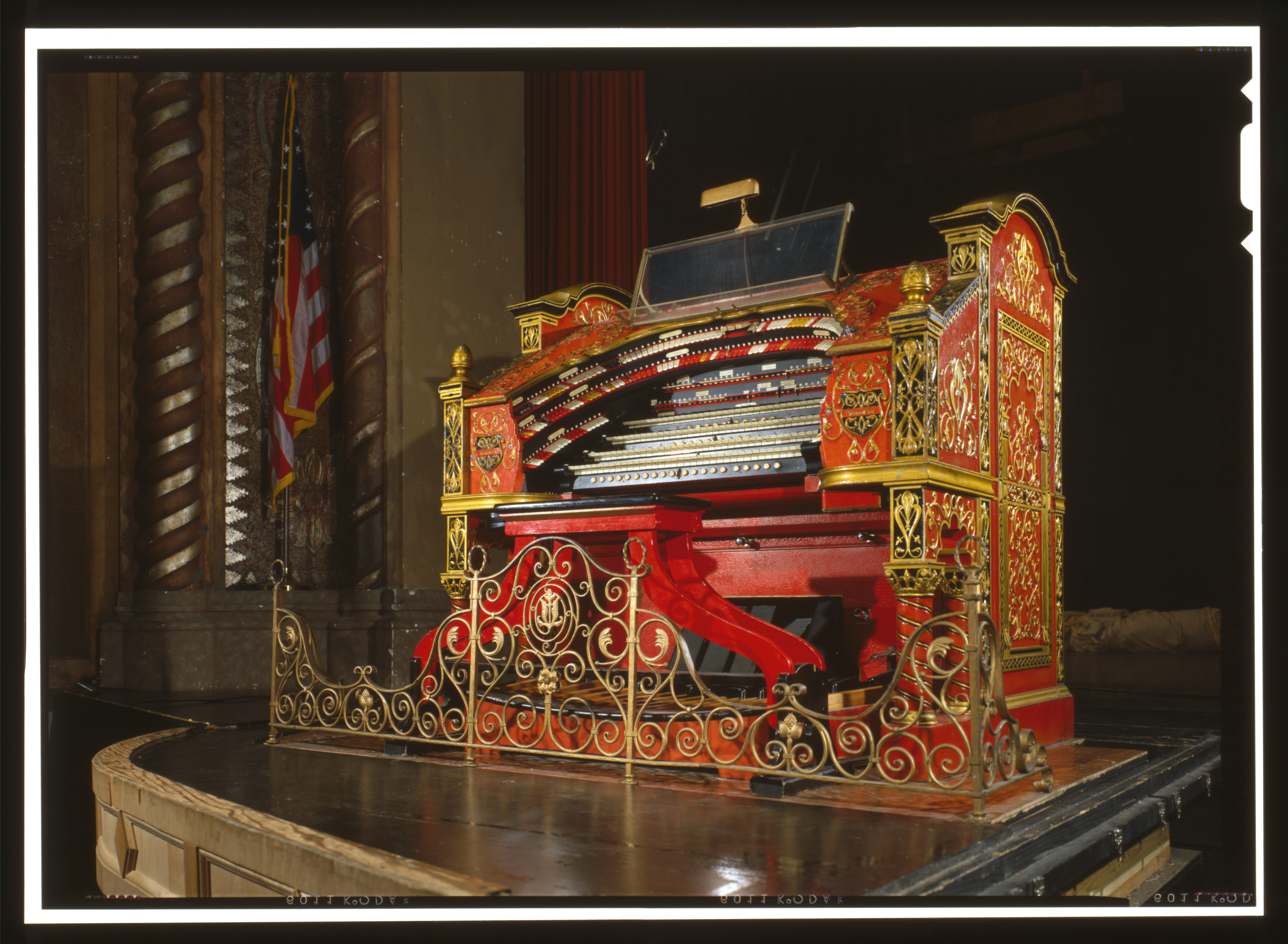
The Colonial's current organ (Wurlitzer Opus 585) which debuted in 2012. It is similar to the theatre's original organ.

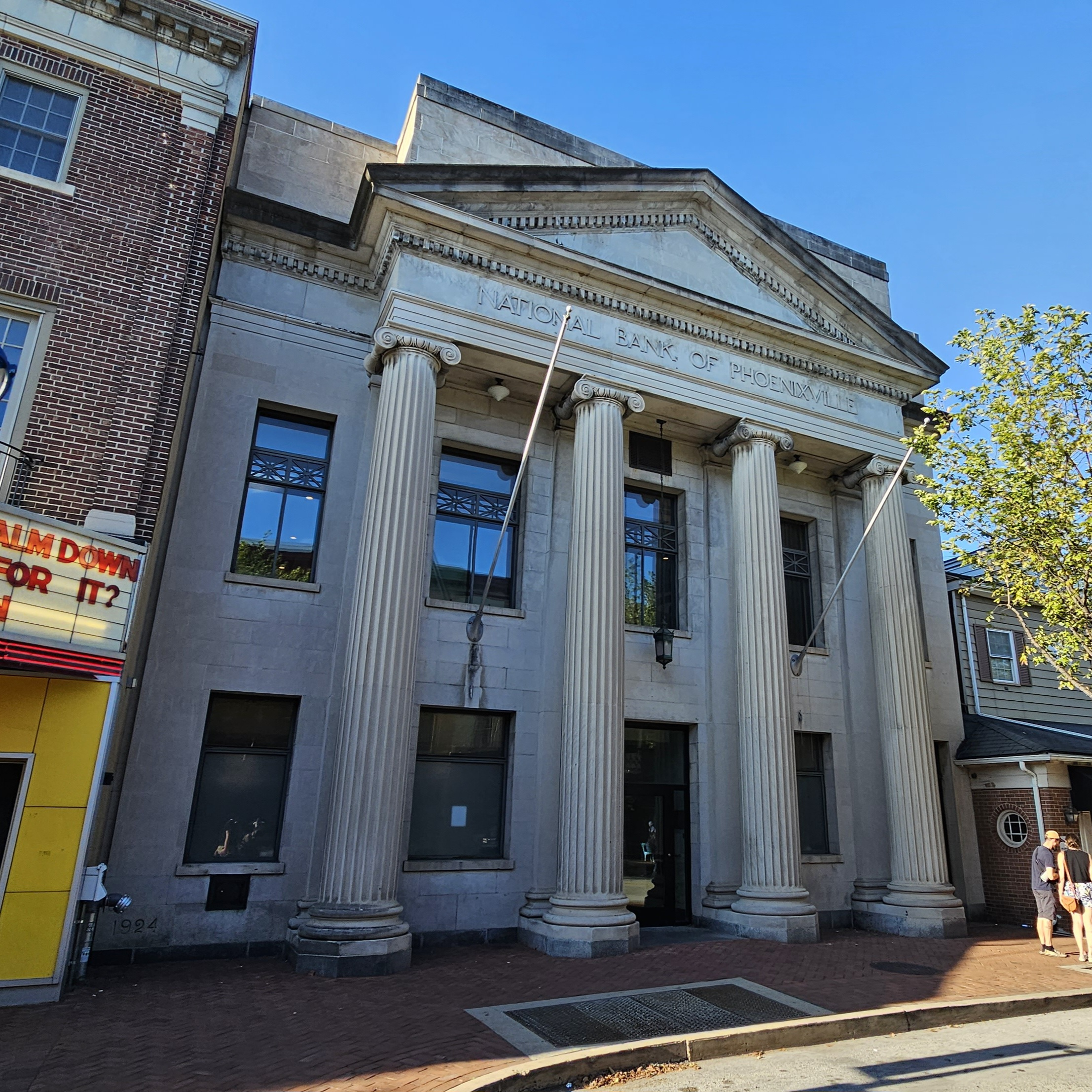
The National Bank of Phoenixville, adjacent to the theater

In 1917, a Wurlitzer organ was installed and used mostly for recitals before news reels. A restored 1929 Kimball pipe organ was installed in the theatre in 1975. Famous organist, Larry Ferrari, once played the organ, calling it a "magnificent instrument." In 2005, the Kimball organ was sold to the Chicago Historical Society and replaced with a Wurlitzer (Opus 585) pipe organ, which was originally installed in Shea's Hippodrome Theatre in Buffalo, New York in 1922. After years of restoration work by The Theatre Organ Society of the Delaware Valley, the first concert with the refurbished Wurlitzer organ was held at The Colonial on September 15, 2012.

=== The Blob ===
In 1958, the classic science fiction movie, The Blob, starring Steve McQueen, was filmed in Phoenixville, Downingtown, Chester Springs, and Royersford. The Colonial Theatre was featured in a pivotal scene of the movie as the creature starts to attack the town. A commemorative plaque is located on the rear wall of the balcony in honor of the film's projection-room scene, in which The Blob oozes through the projection openings. The plaque reads:

"Through this wall in the year 1958 Shorty Yeaoworth's THE BLOB brought the monster into the movie theater and Phoniexville's COLONIALTHEATRE into the annals of film history."

The nearby Downingtown Diner, the location of the final scene, is also currently in operation. In 1978, the Colonial Theatre made a cameo appearance in the movie, Grease, when the trailer of The Blob was shown in the drive-in movie scene.

"Blobfest" is an annual 3-day event each summer, started in 2000, held in downtown Phoenixville that features multiple screenings of The Blob and other horror films. A film competition, scream contest, street fair, and live entertainment are scheduled throughout the weekend. A major part of the festival is a live reenactment of the famous scene filmed at the Colonial, showing screaming movie patrons fleeing through the front doors of the theater.

== 2016 restoration and expansion ==
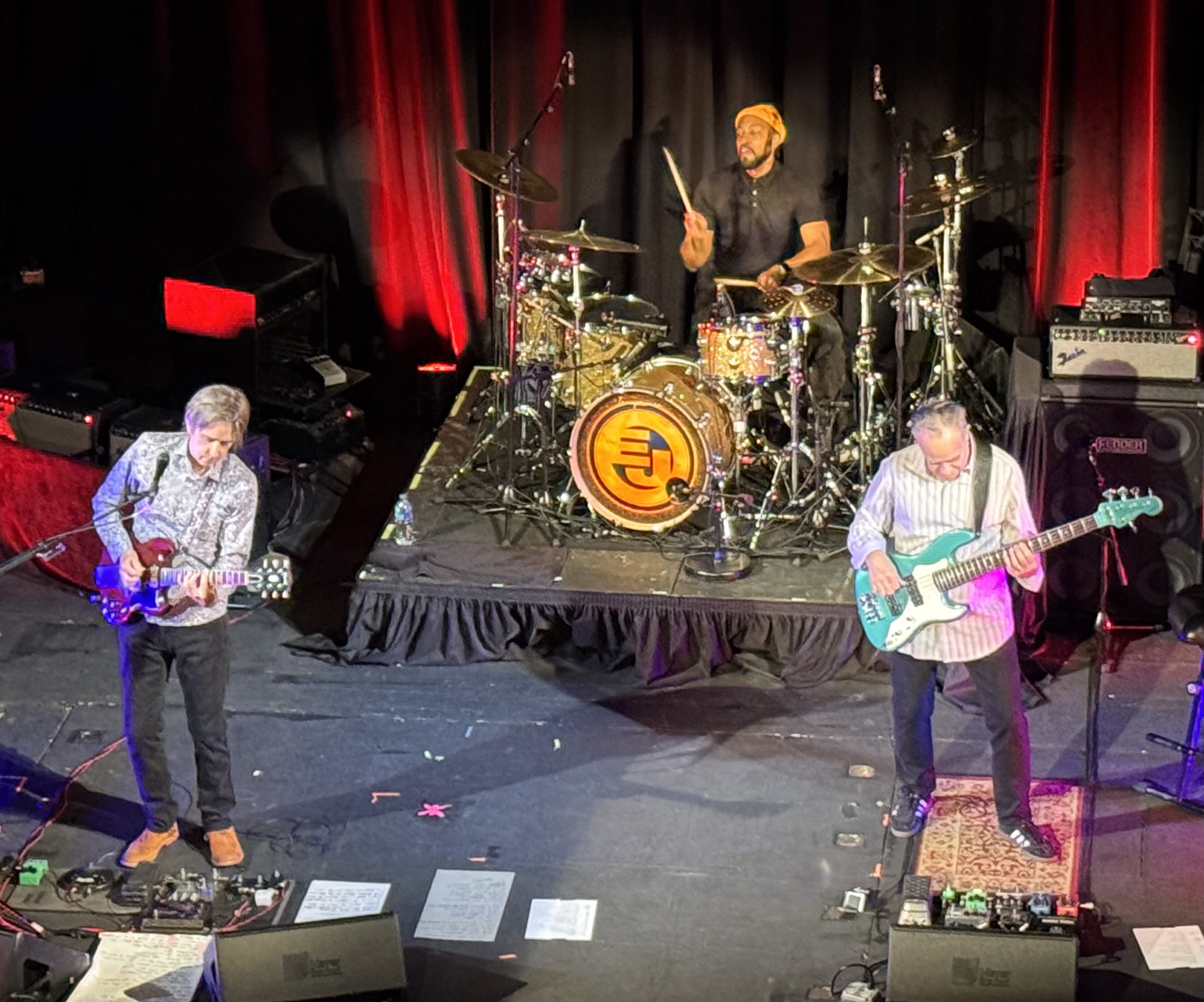
Eric Johnson (left) performing at The Colonial in 2025

The Colonial is the last remaining classic theatre in Phoenixville and all of Chester County. A local group, recognizing the Colonial's historical significance, created the Association for the Colonial Theatre (ACT), a nonprofit corporation committed to the full restoration of The Colonial as a cultural arts center. ACT purchased the theatre on December 8, 1996 and it reopened on October 1, 1999, featuring children's programs, art, and independent and classic films.

On April 4, 2016, a symbolic groundbreaking ceremony was held in front of the theatre, commencing an $8 million expansion and renovation project that served to connect The Colonial with its neighboring building, The National Bank of Phoenixville. The 1925 bank was purchased by ACT in 2011 with the intent of renovating it to provide two additional movie theatres and improved amenities for the theatre, while preserving the historic architecture of the bank building.

The Colonial's expansion opened for business on May 12, 2017. A ribbon-cutting ceremony with the Phoenixville Chamber of Commerce was held on May 17, 2017. The new wing offers a 174-retractable seat stadium-style theatre, an intimate 65-seat screening room-style theatre, and a lobby that showcases a baby grand piano and a 30-foot (9.1 m) concession stand. The expansion also offers dressing rooms for performers, a concession stand for special events, a catering kitchen, and a second floor garden suite with outside deck access.

Current programming includes a variety of film genres including: first-run, independent, and classic, along with concerts, community events, The theater is also available for rent for private events.
