= WPHE =

Radio station in Phoenixville, Pennsylvania, United States

- Phoenixville, Pennsylvania; United States
- Broadcast area: Philadelphia metropolitan area
- Frequency: 690 kHz
- Branding: Radio Salvación

Programming
- Language: Spanish
- Format: Christian radio

Ownership
- Owner: Salvation Broadcasting Co.

History
- First air date: May 29, 1979
- Former call signs: WYIS (1979–1989)

Technical information
- Licensing authority: FCC
- Facility ID: 58738
- Class: D
- Power: 1,000 watts (daytime only)
- Transmitter coordinates: 40°8′8.4″N 75°33′35.7″W

Links
- Public license information: Public file; LMS
- Website: www.radiosalvacion.com

WPHE (690 AM) in Phoenixville, Pennsylvania, is known as Radio Salvación (Salvation Radio), a Spanish Christian radio station. Before it was acquired by the Radio Salvación corporation, it was WYIS Radio 7. Radio 7 was divided in Revista Radio Cultural with its main show El Tiempo Latino in the mornings and summer late evenings, produced and hosted by Frantz St.Iago-Peretz Bennazar and Radio Nuevo Horizonte Spanish religious block in the afternoons led by Rev. José Rivera. Frantz St.Iago-Peretz Bennazar, a Sephardi, provided pastoral care services to the congregation at Hopewell Mennonite Church in Reading, Pennsylvania, from April 3, 2005, until April 3, 2015.

The team of WYIS included Aixa Torregrosa, Rev. José Castro, Gloria Shanely, Juan Carlos Izquierdo and many other well-known radio personalities. In 1988, the station was sold by its owner, Dr. B. Sam Hart, to Rev. Sarrail Salvá. Mr. Salvá was a well-known religious radio announcer in Radio Redentor of Utuado and Radio Felicidad of Peñuelas, Puerto Rico. WYIS was a radio station with diversity in its programming, including almost a whole day in Portuguese and programs in English, Greek, and Hebrew. Today, WPHE is exclusively a fundamentalist evangelical Pentecostal radio station, although its leaders were affiliated with the Lancaster Conference of the Mennonite Church U.S.A. They broke from the Conference to form Koinonia, an Anabaptist association of churches in Philadelphia. Salvá and Juan Carlos Izquierdo were well respected leaders in Philadelphia. Sarraíl Salvá resigned as President of WPHE and from his pastoral role at La Familia. His wife Isabel continues serving as the pastor of Iglesia La Familia. His family left the radio station. Currently, WPHE continues to work with a board of directors.
