= Gay Street School =

- U.S. National Register of Historic Places
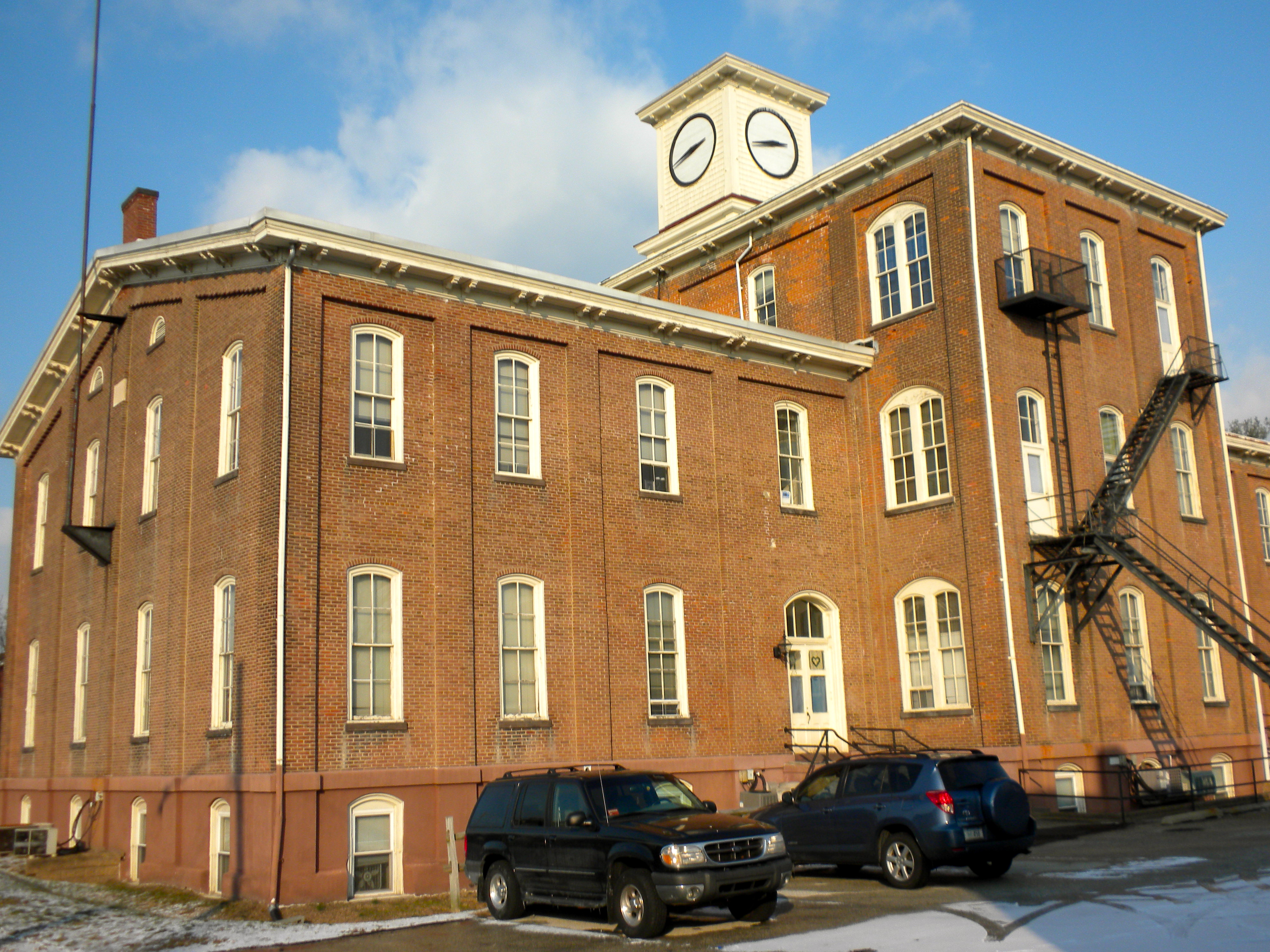
- Gay Street School, January 2010

- Location within Pennsylvania Location within the United States
- Location: Gay and Morgan Sts., Phoenixville, Pennsylvania
- Coordinates: 40°07′50″N 75°31′03″W
- Area: 1.3 acres (0.53 ha)
- Built: 1874
- Architect: Ellis, Col. Nathaniel M.
- NRHP reference No.: 83004202
- Added to NRHP: November 1, 1983

Gay Street School is a historic school building located in Phoenixville, Chester County, Pennsylvania. It has two sections. The older section, the west wing, was built in 1874, and is a two-story, brick structure. The two-story east wing and three-story central section were added in 1883. The building features a clock and bell tower.

It was listed on the National Register of Historic Places in 1983.
