= William George Wilson =

American cinematographer (1917–2007)

William G. Wilson
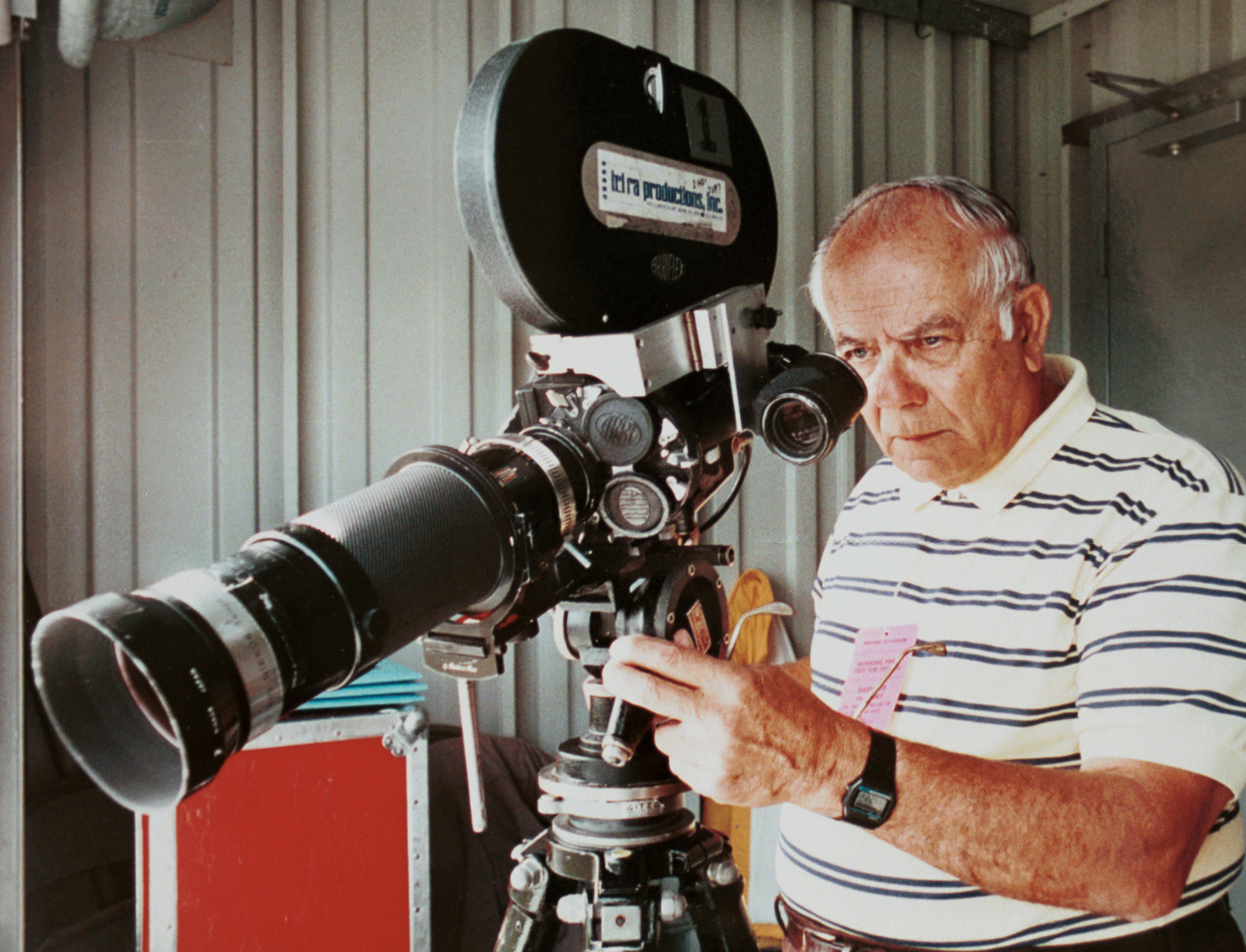
- Bill Wilson shooting Army football highlights at West point
- Born: March 10, 1917; Phoenixville, Pennsylvania, US
- Died: October 28, 2007 (aged 90)
- Occupation: Sports Cinematographer
- Organizations: IATSE, NPPA, ICCA, Phila. Press Photographers Assn., Delaware County Sports Hall of Fame
- Spouse: Jean Hoff Wilson
- Awards: NPPA News Pictures of the Year Competition, First Place, Newsreel Sports, 1956

William G. Wilson (March 10, 1917 – October 28, 2007) was an American cinematographer and Director of Photography (DP) who filmed hundreds of championship sporting events during a career that spanned more than 50 years. Wilson filmed baseball, football, basketball, ice hockey, golf, boxing, horse-racing and auto racing. His pioneering work in television news-filming for WFIL-TV in Philadelphia, the first ABC affiliate station in the nation, set early standards for filming news and sports. During World War II, Wilson served as a combat cameraman and aviator with the United States Marine Corps, filming major action in the South Pacific on the ground and in the air.

== Biography ==
Born in Phoenixville, Pennsylvania, on March 10, 1917, William Wilson grew up on a farm near Kimberton, Pennsylvania. He was one of ten children. His father, William M. Wilson, who owned a plumbing business, served as the mayor of Phoenixville and on borough council for 28 years. Wilson excelled at baseball as a young man and played semi-pro ball as a second-baseman. He was invited to a tryout with the New York Baseball Giants, but the outbreak of war cut short a fledgling athletic career. Shortly after the Japanese attack on Pearl Harbor, Wilson enlisted in the United States Marine Corps, where he served as a combat cameraman and aviator. While on leave in Philadelphia, he met Jean Hoff, serving with the Navy WAVES, whom he married in 1945. They were married for 62 years and raised three children in Folcroft, Delaware County, Pennsylvania where he lived until his death on October 28, 2007.

== Military photography ==
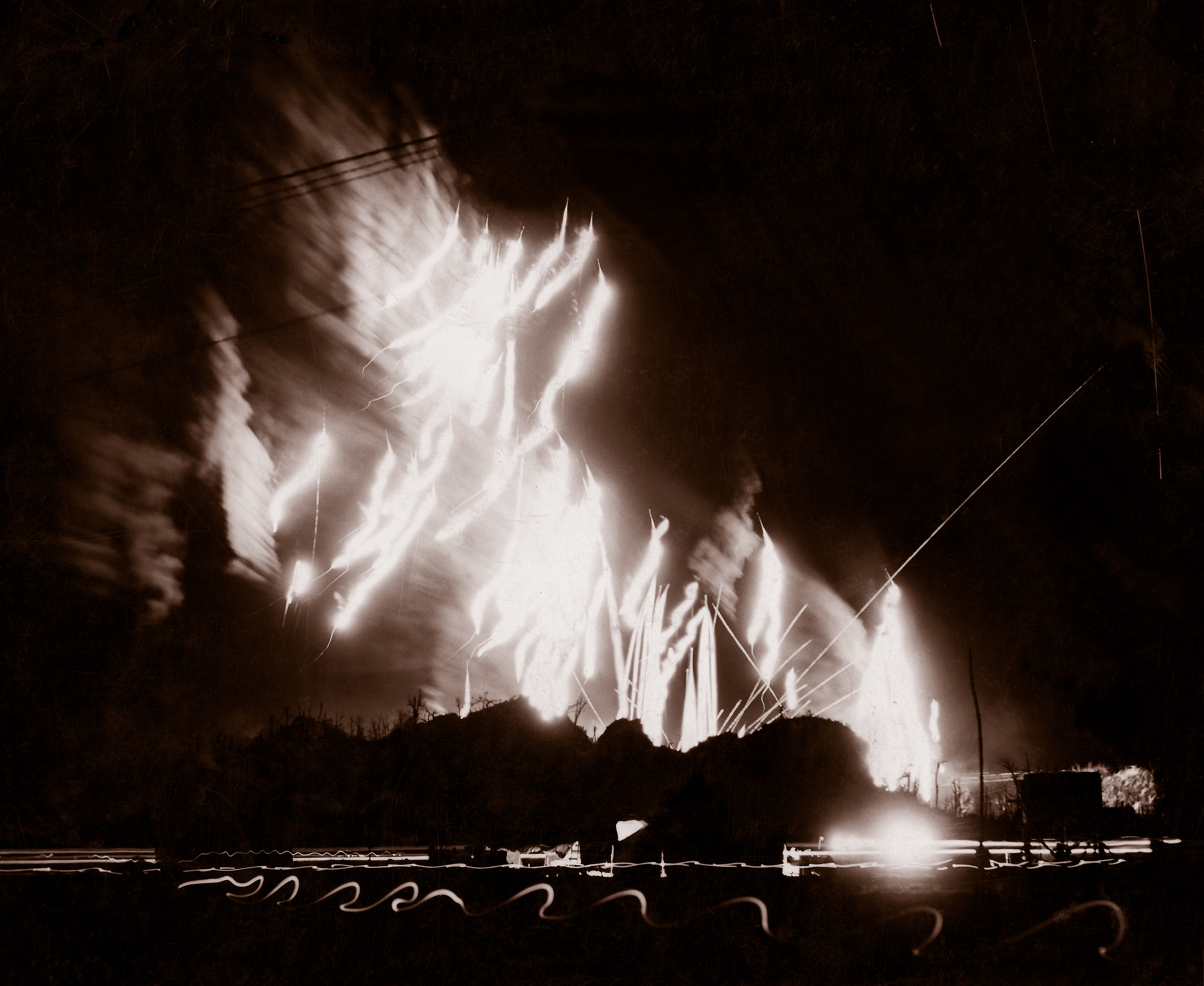
Wilson's time exposure of Japanese attack on Marines at Bloody Nose Ridge, Fall, 1944, with dramatic tracer ammunition fire

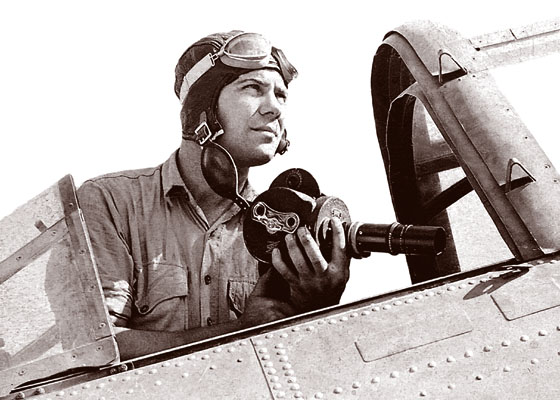
SSgt William G. Wilson, Combat Cameraman with 2nd Marine Air Wing in South Pacific, in 1944.

Wilson began his film career as a combat cameraman with the United States Marine Corps in the South Pacific during World War II. He enlisted in the Marines shortly after the attack on Pearl Harbor and, following boot camp, received specialized photographic training with Severo Antonelli in Philadelphia and at Life Magazine in New York City. Wilson served with the 1st Marine Aircraft Wing and 2nd Marine Aircraft Wing in the South Pacific recording the activities of Marine units on the ground and in the air. He flew numerous combat missions and was a qualified tail-gunner. Attaining the rank of Staff-Sergeant, Wilson saw duty on Guadalcanal, Bougainville, Peleliu, Munda, Espiritu Santo, Rabaul, Leyte Gulf and New Georgia in the British Solomon Islands. He was personally awarded a medal by Admiral Chester W. Nimitz for courage under fire while filming a cargo drop in an exposed position from the open door of an aircraft to determine parachute drift patterns. One of his photographs of a fierce night battle at Bloody Nose Ridge on Peleliu, published in over 500 newspapers, was recognized by Commander Edward Steichen, Chief of Naval Photography, as one of the best pictures depicting action in the Pacific theater.

== Television newsfilming ==
At the conclusion of the war Wilson went to work as a staff cameraman for WFIL-TV, the Philadelphia Inquirer television station. While at WFIL-TV Wilson filmed the screen test for Dick Clark, the iconic host of American Bandstand. In 1956, Wilson was awarded top honors in newsreel sports photography in the 13th Annual News Pictures of the Year Competition by the National Press Photographers Association for innovative techniques filming horse-racing. One of his technical accomplishments involved mounting two 16mm Kodak Cine Special II motion picture cameras side by side on a specially designed plate for filming horse-racing. One camera was equipped with a long telephoto lens to isolate the view to a single horse and the other a shorter focal length lens to show a wider view of the horses. Another innovation was the design of a preset lens aperture control for maintaining proper film exposure between highlight and shadow areas when filming under the challenging lighting conditions in sports stadiums. This was prior to the advent of automatic electronic aperture devices. In addition to his work for WFIL-TV, Wilson also worked as a news cameraman for KYW-TV and WCAU-TV in Philadelphia and for ABC, NBC, CBS and UPI TV News.

== Sports cinematography ==
Wilson's love for sports led him to become one of the most accomplished cinematographers in that category. He worked for Louis W. Kellman's Newsreel Laboratory in Philadelphia and Tel-Ra Productions, two prominent producers of sports programming during the 1950s and 1960s. He was the principle cinematographer for numerous popular television sports programs including Tele-Sports Digest and Gillette Cavalcade of Sports. Tele-Sports Digest was an early forerunner of ABC's Wide World of Sports and other television sports highlight programs. Wilson traveled more than 2,000,000 miles (3,200,000 km), crisscrossing the nation filming major sporting events including 30 baseball World Series, 20 baseball All-Star games, 30 Kentucky Derby horse races, 20 Masters golf tournaments, 15 U.S. Open golf tournaments, 15 Indianapolis 500 auto races, 6 Stanley Cups and hundreds of college and pro football games including 13 NFL Championships and Super Bowl I and Super Bowl II. He filmed numerous boxing championship matches involving Rocky Marciano, Sonny Liston and Jake LaMotta. His cinematography is immortalized in scores of college football highlight films for major universities including Notre Dame, Ohio State, Penn State, Alabama, Boston College and scores of others. He filmed more than 20 college football bowl games. For filming football he typically used a 16mm Arriflex M (Arri) fitted with an 85-250mm Nikkor zoom lens. He was a regular cameraman for Winik & Winik Productions in New York City, Major League Baseball Productions, NCAA Football and the New York Racing Association. He filmed nearly every Army-Navy football game between 1955 and 1995. His cinematography for a Breeders Cup film was nominated for an Emmy. As a cameraman, Wilson was a fixture at World Series games and was so well known around the baseball diamond that former President Richard Nixon once asked him to make introductions to one of his favorite Oakland Athletics players.

== Commercial, industrial, documentary and feature films ==
Wilson filmed scores of television commercials including the technically challenging clean carburetor series for Atlantic Refining Company. He also worked on industrial, educational and documentary films including a production on the construction of the Walt Whitman Bridge, on the Delaware River. That production, The Birth of a Bridge required Wilson climbing to the top of one of the bridge towers by ascending the unprotected suspension cables carrying a motion picture camera and tripod. He worked on a few feature films including The Burglar, director Paul Wendkos' film noir classic starring Jayne Mansfield and Dan Duryea. In that film he even played a bit role as a television stage director. He also was a cinematographer, along with Morris Kellman, on the popular children's television show Diver Dan. Wilson continued as an active cinematographer well into his seventies, filming college football highlights for the United States Military Academy at West Point. Mr. Wilson was a lifelong member of IATSE, the International Alliance of Theatrical Stage Employees, Local 644 (now 600), the craft union of motion picture cameramen. He was also a member of the Philadelphia Press Photographers Association and International Association of Combat Cameramen until his death in 2007 at age 90.

== Awards ==
- National Press Photographers Association, 13th Annual News Pictures of the Year Competition, 1956, First Place, Newsreel Sports.
- Delaware County Sports Hall of Fame, inducted 1999.
