= Phoenixville Historic District =

Historic district in Pennsylvania, United States

- U.S. National Register of Historic Places
- U.S. Historic district
- The center of the Phoenixville Historic District, looking southwest across the Phoenix Iron Works site and French Creek

- Location within Pennsylvania Location within the United States
- Location: Roughly bounded by Penn St., RR tracks, Fourth Ave., and Wheatland St., Phoenixville, Pennsylvania
- Coordinates: 40°08′00″N 75°31′00″W
- Area: 296.9 acres (120.2 ha)
- Built: 1765
- Architect: Grover, T.D.; Et al.
- Architectural style: Italianate, Greek Revival, Second Empire
- NRHP reference No.: 87000378
- Added to NRHP: March 17, 1987

The Phoenixville Historic District is a national historic district located at Phoenixville, Chester County, Pennsylvania. The district consists of the older part of Phoenixville, especially the former Phoenix Iron Works site and its employee and owner housing.

At the time of nomination (c. 1987), the district contained 908 contributing buildings, 52 non-contributing buildings and one contributing structure (bridge). The district is "roughly bounded by Penn St., RR tracks, Fourth Ave., and Wheatland St." This historic district is the largest in Chester County.
