= Phoenix Iron Works (Phoenixville, Pennsylvania) =

American iron and steel manufacturer

Mid-19th-century engraving of the Phoenix Iron Works

The Phoenix Iron Works, also known as the Phoenix Iron Company, Phoenix Iron & Steel Company, and Phoenix Steel Corporation, was a manufacturer of iron and related products during the 19th and 20th centuries. Located in Phoenixville, Pennsylvania, Phoenix Iron Company was a major producer of cannons for the Union Army during the American Civil War. The company also produced the Phoenix column, an advance in construction material. Company facilities are a core component of the Phoenixville Historic District, a National Register of Historic Places site that was in 2006 recognized as a historic landmark by ASM International.

== History ==
Founded in 1790 to produce nails and purchased in 1812 by New Jersey industrialist Robert Waln, the Phoenix Iron Company produced pig iron, wrought iron, and other iron-related materials and end products. As the complex grew, it featured a huge blast furnace and puddling furnace, an adjacent iron foundry, warehouses, ancillary buildings, and associated equipment. In 1825, the company was the first to generate steam by burning anthracite coal. Other innovations followed, as engineers at the foundry invented a power-driven rolling method to weld and forge wrought iron, a process that enabled the iron company to begin producing cannons for the United States Army.

In the late 20th century, the company declined along with the steel and iron industry of Pennsylvania. By 1984, production in Phoenixville had ceased. In 1986, the new management of the renamed Phoenix Steel Corporation announced plans to close its remaining production plants in Claymont, Delaware. The following year, the rolling mill closed, all production of steel ceased, Phoenix made its last shipment of steel, and its remaining production and maintenance employees were laid off. Throughout 1987, a number of investors approached Phoenix about acquiring the Claymont mill, and in 1988, Phoenix sold it to CITIC, a state-owned investment company of the People's Republic of China for $13 million.

In 1998, the Phoenixville Area Economic Development Corporation (PAEDCO) took ownership of the building. Under the guidance of the National Park Service, PAEDCO undertook exterior renovations and constructed the Schuylkill River Heritage Center which occupies 1,600 sq.ft. of the historic Foundry Building. The museum tells the story of the Phoenix Iron & Steel Company and also provides information about the industrial legacy of the Schuylkill River.(www.phoenixvillefoundry.org) The Hankin Group acquired the Phoenix Foundry property from PAEDCO in 2006 to create an 18,000 square feet (1,700 m^{2}) event space.

As of 2012, the Phoenix Steel site is empty. Most of its buildings were dismantled. Only the old foundry and company office buildings remain from the once-sprawling complex; both have been restored and put to other uses.

== Products ==
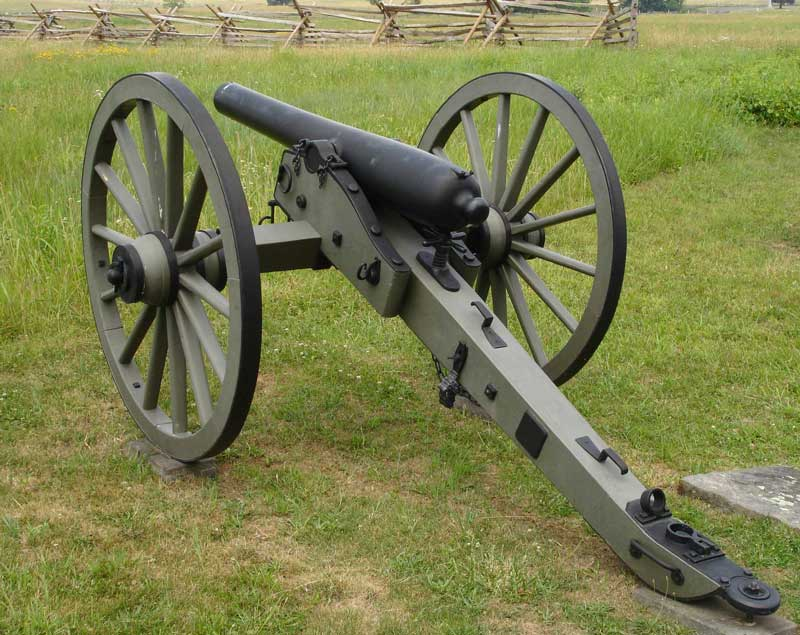
3-Inch Ordnance Rifle

Besides the Griffen Gun and the Phoenix Column, the company produced iron for rails for the Pennsylvania Railroad and other eastern railroad lines, wrought iron for fencing and home decorative usage, and similar applications, as well as steel products. The Eiffel Tower in Paris used puddled iron from Phoenixville.

=== Griffen Gun ===
In 1855 John Griffen Jr.developed the famous Griffen Gun while he was at the Safe Harbor Iron Works, a large rolling mill, located in Safe Harbor, Pennsylvania and was operated by the firm Reeves, Abbott & Co. of Philadelphia. In 1855, the Phoenix Iron Works foundry began producing six-pounder smoothbore artillery pieces known as Griffen Guns, after inventor John Griffen Jr. Hundreds were turned out before production shifted in 1861 to other Griffen designs. Company owner Daniel Reeves spent much money on equipment and processes to modernize the factory and make it one of America's leading producers of iron and steel.

During the Civil War, the factory manufactured over 1,000 Griffen-designed 3-inch Ordnance rifles, the lion's share of the more than 1,400 similar guns eventually bought by the Army. Produced by the company's unique rolling process, the 820 lb (370 kg) wrought iron barrels were durable and resisted bursting, unlike the cast iron gun tubes of Phoenixville's smaller competitors. At its peak, the factory was producing fifty rifles a week.

Many of these rifled guns are in private collections, municipal parks, and at battlefields across the country, including the Gettysburg Battlefield. They are distinguished by the letters PIC (for Phoenix Iron Company) stamped on the muzzle.

=== Phoenix column ===
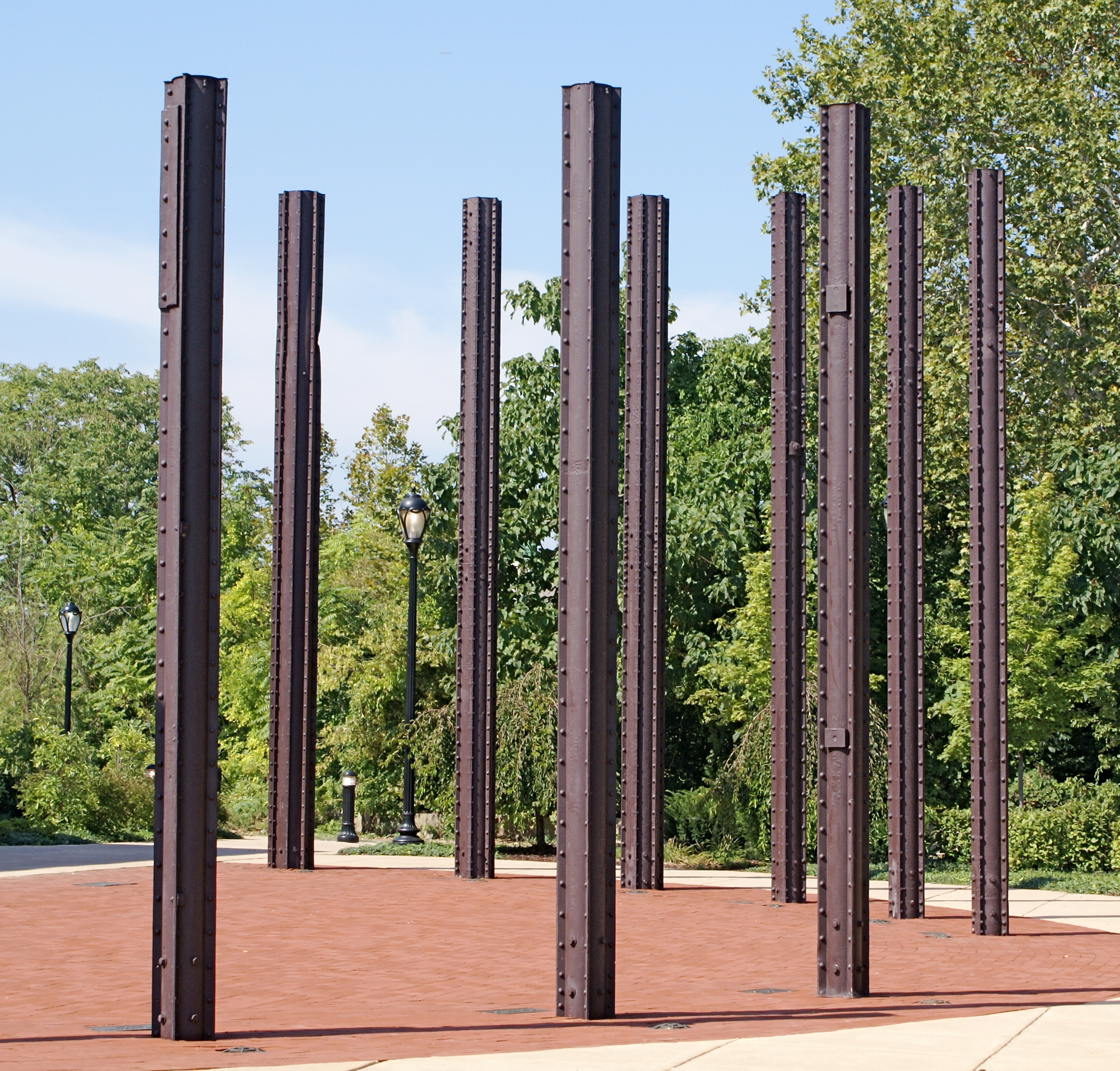
An arc of Phoenix Columns adorns a plaza outside the old foundry building.

The Phoenix Column, patented by Samuel Reeves in 1862, was a hollow cylinder composed of four, six, or eight wrought iron segments riveted together. The resulting column was much lighter and stronger than the solid cast iron columns of the day. It allowed the construction of massive structures by lightening their load-bearing walls. Taller buildings could be built on narrow urban plots, advancing the development of the skyscraper and high-stress-load-bearing bridges.

== Phoenix Bridge Company ==
The success of the Phoenix column led to the formation of a construction subsidiary named Clarke, Reeves & Co. Later renamed the Phoenixville Bridge Works and finally the Phoenix Bridge Company, the firm ultimately built some 4,200 bridges, primarily wrought iron truss railway bridges. Phoenix Bridge helped build the Manhattan Bridge, the Walnut Street Bridge in Harrisburg, Pennsylvania, and the Calhoun Street Bridge, between Trenton, New Jersey, and Morrisville, Pennsylvania, and projects as far away as Chile, Russia and China. In 1900, the Bridge Company was awarded the contract for the Quebec Bridge across the St. Lawrence River, which collapsed while under construction in 1907. Despite the blow to its reputation, Phoenix Bridge lived on for another half-century, ultimately closing in 1962. A number of the company's works are listed on the U.S. National Register of Historic Places.

Works include:

- Boston University Bridge, between Cambridge, Massachusetts and Boston, Massachusetts built in 1927.
- Bridge in West Fallowfield Township, Ross Fording Road over Octoraro Creek, near Steelville, West Fallowfield Township, Pennsylvania, NRHP-listed
- Bridge in Upper Frederick Township, Fagleysville Rd. over Swamp Creek, Fagleysville, Pennsylvania (Phoenix Bridge Co.), NRHP-listed
- Brocton Arch, jct. of Main St. with Lake and Highland Aves., Brocton, New York (Phoenix Bridge Co.), NRHP-listed
- County Line Bowstring, over West Creek, Northwest of Hollis, Hollis, Kansas, and Wayne, Kansas (Phoenix Bridge Co.), NRHP-listed
- Etters Bridge, Green Lane Dr. and Yellow Breeches Creek, Fairview Township, Pennsylvania, and Lower Allen Township, Pennsylvania (Phoenix Bridge Co.), NRHP-listed
- Phoenix Bridge, Northwest of Eagle Rock off Virginia 615 over Craig Creek, Eagle Rock, Virginia (Phoenix Bridge Co.), NRHP-listed
- Trenton City/Calhoun Street Bridge, spans Delaware River between Morrisville, Pennsylvania, and Trenton, New Jersey (Phoenix Bridge Co.), NRHP-listed
- Mill City Oregon Railroad Bridge, now a pedestrian bridge. A Phoenix Column bridge, manufactured in 1888, moved to San Jose, CA then Lake Oswego Oregon then to Mill City Oregon, Installed 1919. Abandoned by Southern Pacific railroad around 1967 and used as a pedestrian and bike bridge. Current restoration being undertaken by 'Save our Bridge"
- Dingman's Ferry Bridge, in Dingman Township, Pennsylvania and Sandyston Township, New Jersey was built in 1900 using Phoenix columns and other steel from another Phoenix bridge
- Raven Rock Road Bridge, Hunterdon County, New Jersey, built in 1878, NRHP-listed

Works in Brazil:

- Complexo FEPASA, in Jundiaí, São Paulo, Brazil. The railway workshop shed structure was bought in 1890.
- Recife's Bridge at Capibaribe river, was built in 1884.

=== Phoenix Wheel ===
In 1893, the Phoenix Bridge Company constructed four Ferris wheels, known as "Phoenix Wheels". One of which was given to the town of Asbury Park, New Jersey, where it operated near the town's boardwalk until 1988. It was briefly moved to an amusement park in Mississippi before being disassembled and returned to Phoenixville in 2008, though by then the Phoenix Bridge Company and Phoenix Iron Company as a whole had gone defunct. In 2026, the wheel was restored and reassembled in downtown Phoenixville. It is the oldest active Ferris wheel in the world, though it does not currently operate.

== Gallery ==
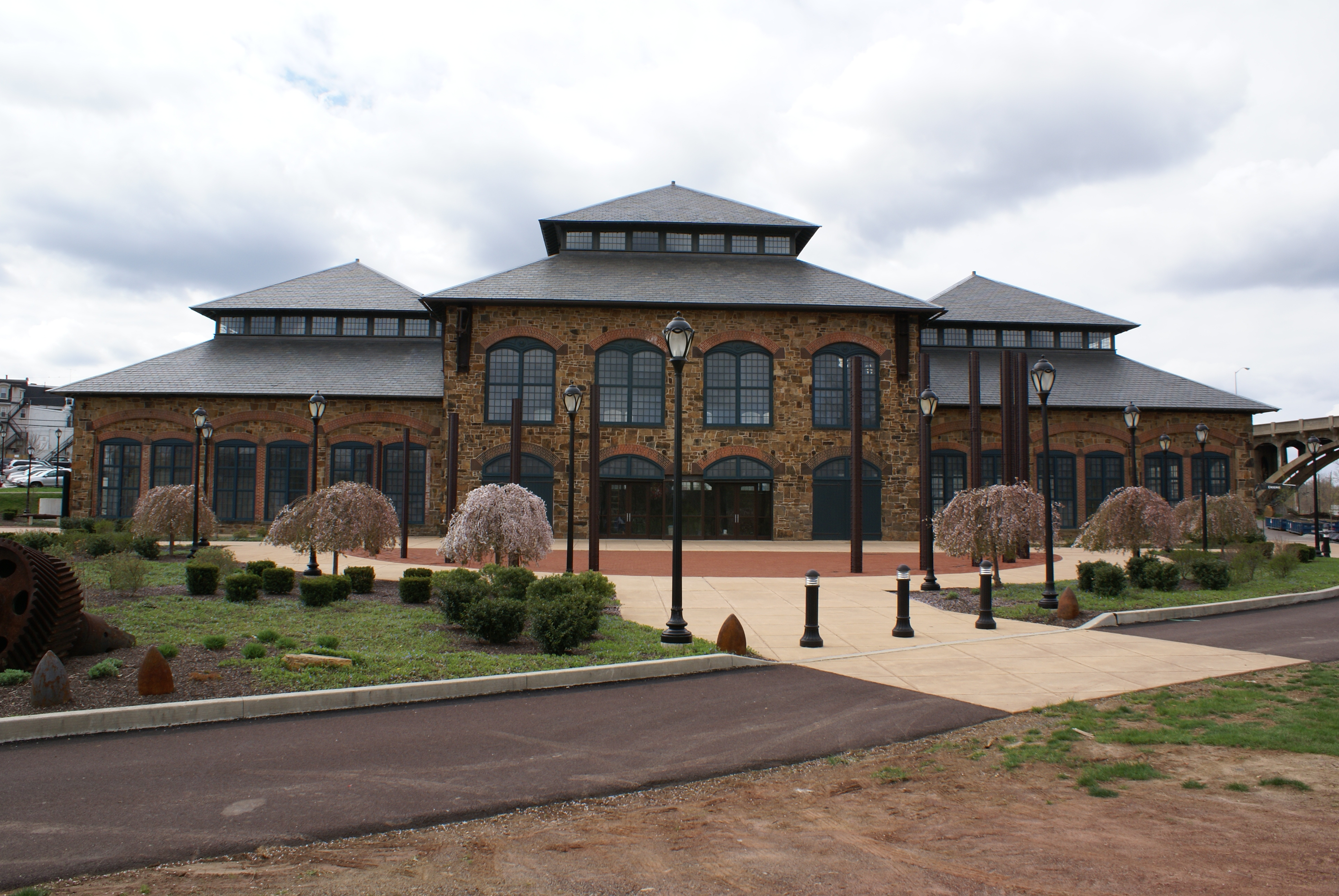
Restored Phoenix Iron Works foundry building.
40°08′06″N 75°31′03″W

Restored company office building.
40°08′04″N 75°30′47″W

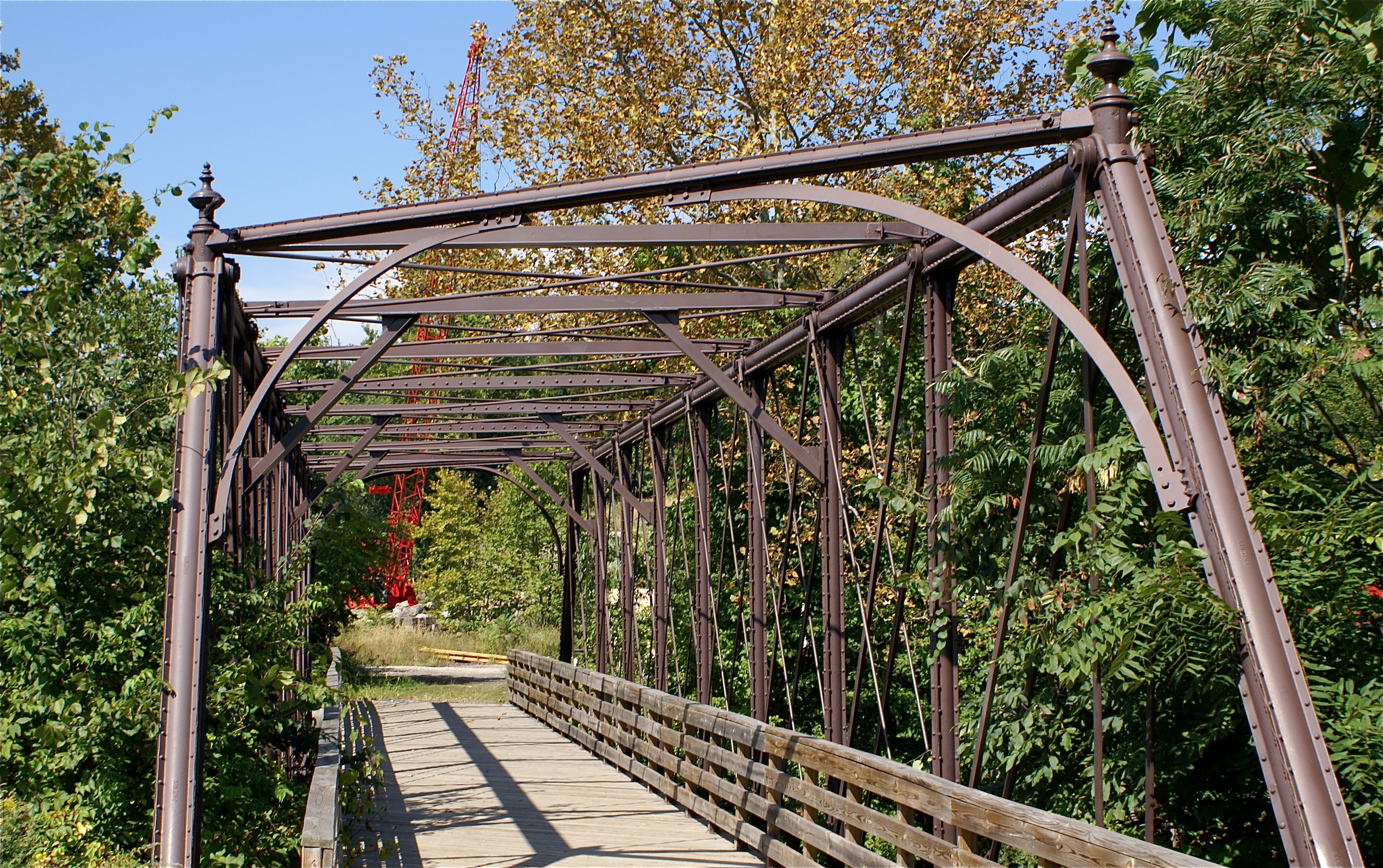
Bridge on the Works site, crossing French Creek (once carrying a spur from the Pickering Valley Railroad), constructed with Phoenix columns.
40°08′08.4″N 75°31′03″W

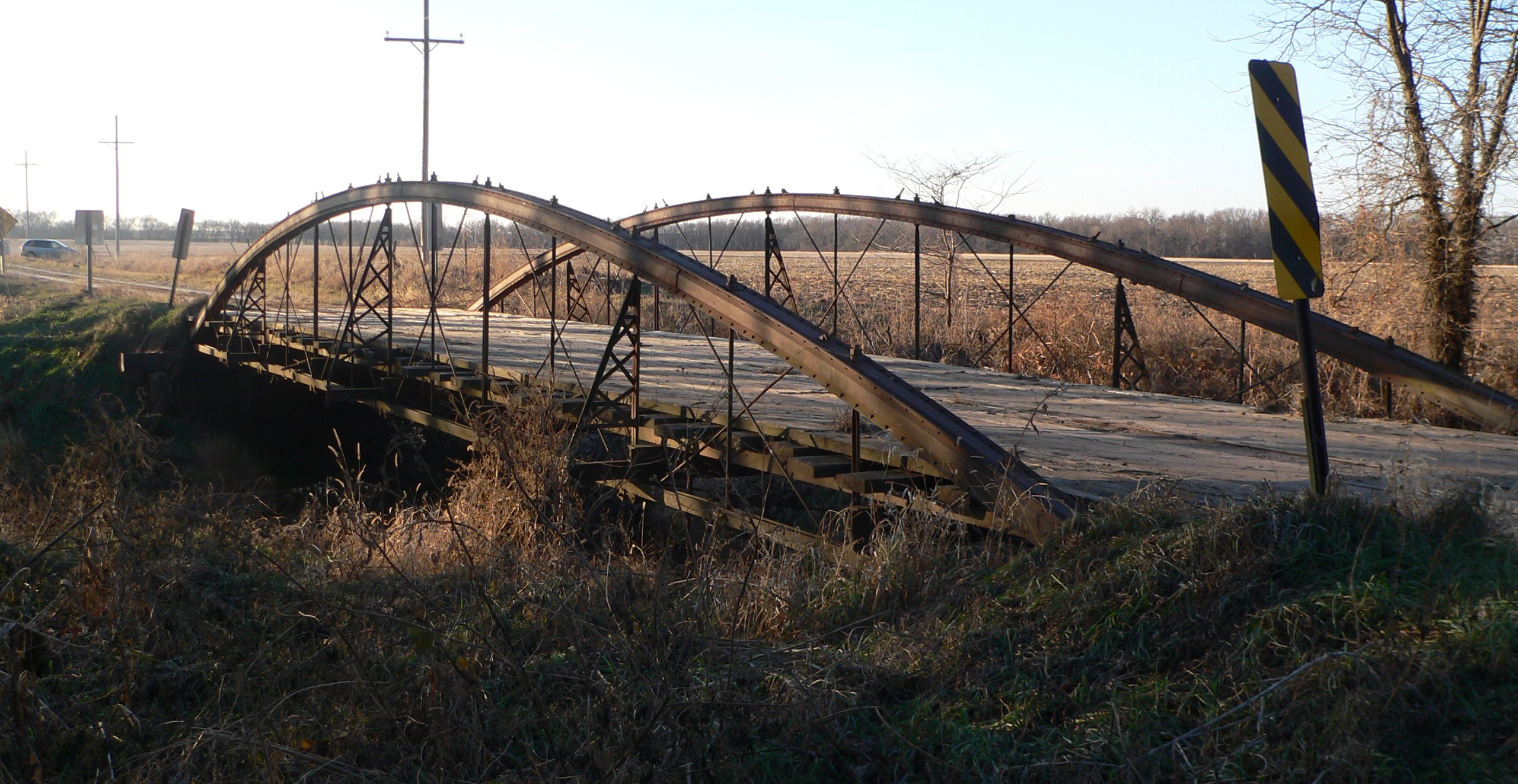
County Line Bowstring near Hollis, Kansas
39°39′14″N 97°34′23″W

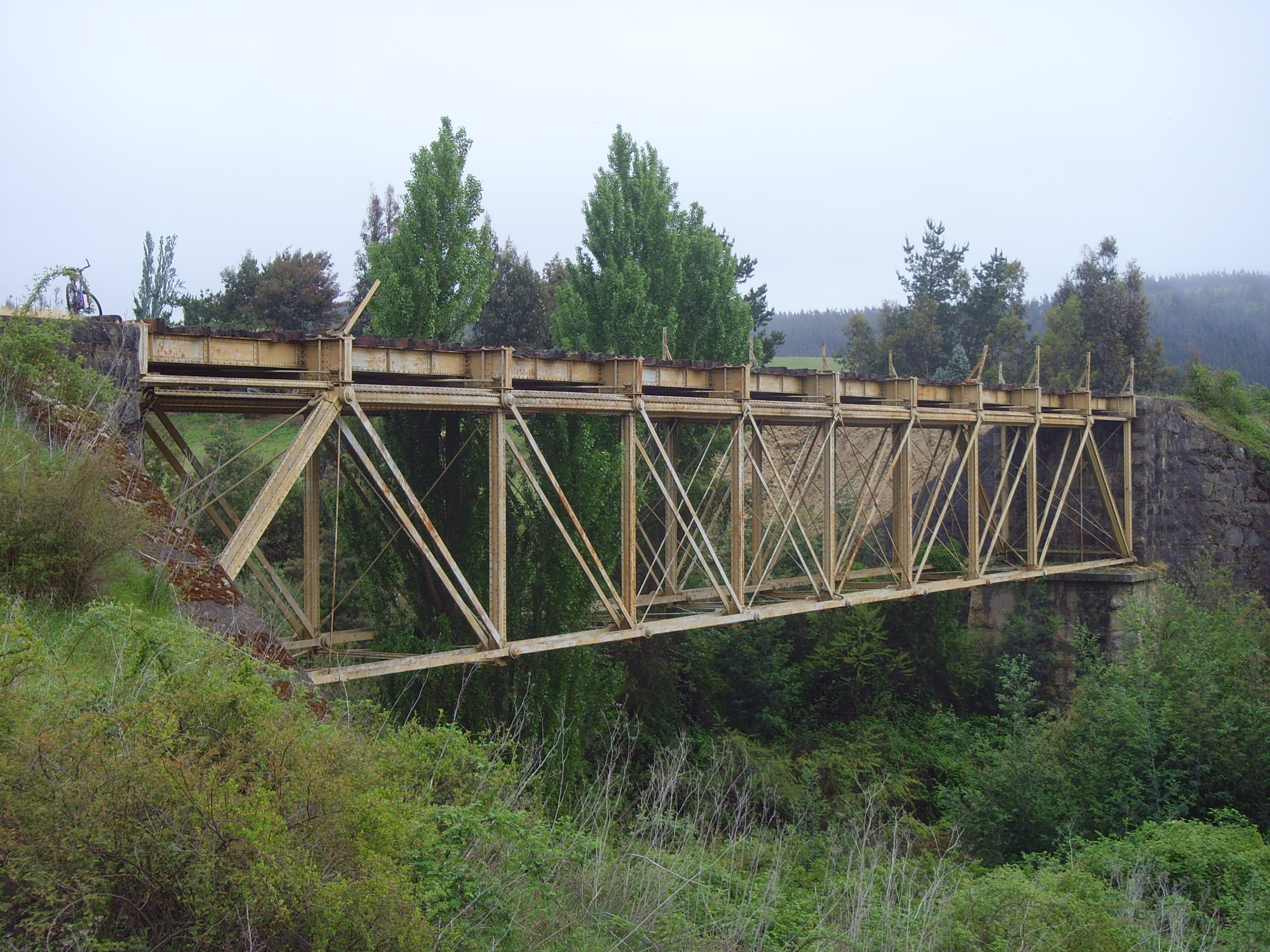
Disused railway bridge, Rehue river, Angol, Chile

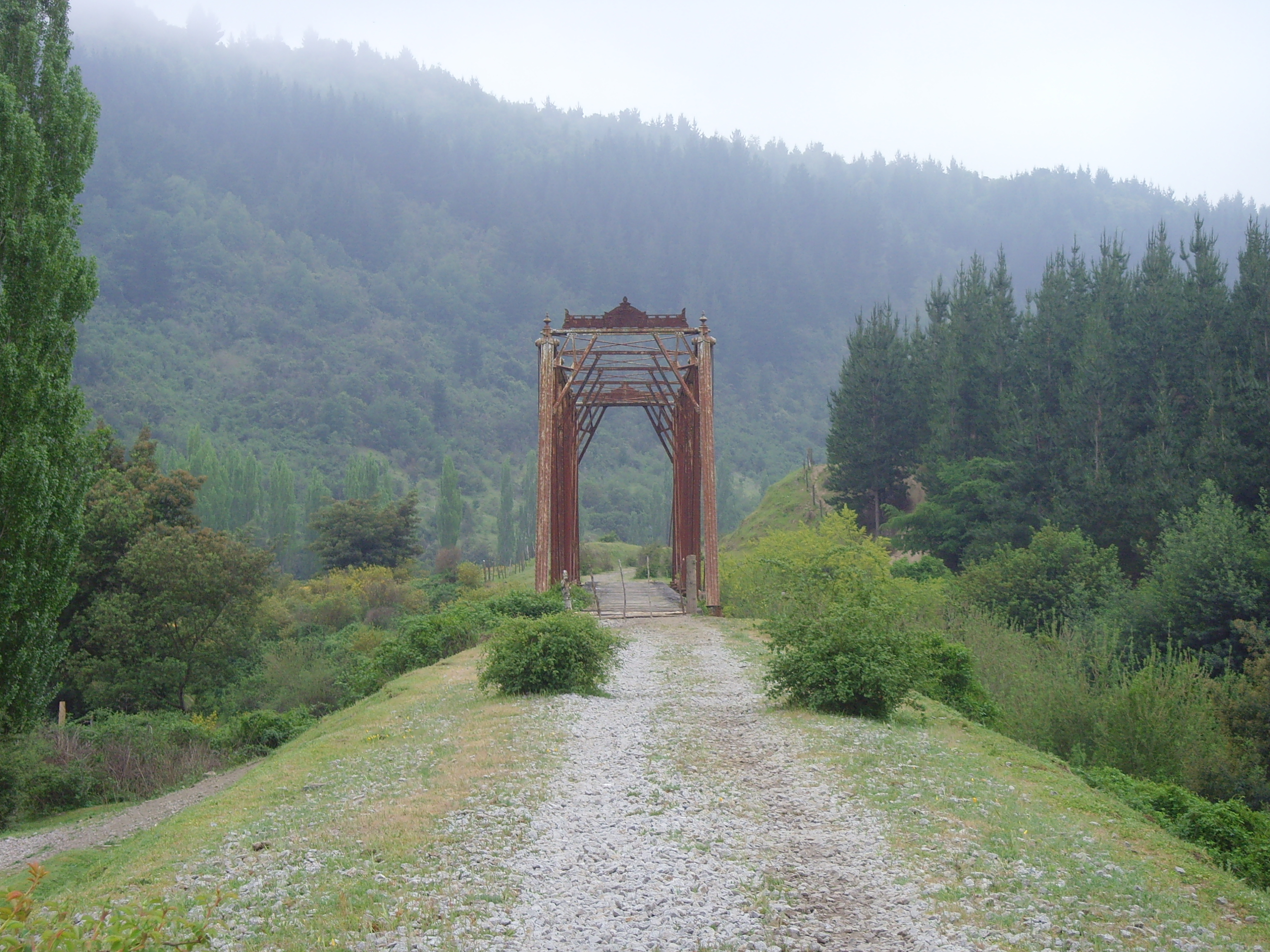
Disused railway bridge, Rehue river, Angol, Chile

== See also ==
- Hayden Bridge (Springfield, Oregon)
