= Phoenixville, Pennsylvania =

Borough in Pennsylvania, US

- Borough
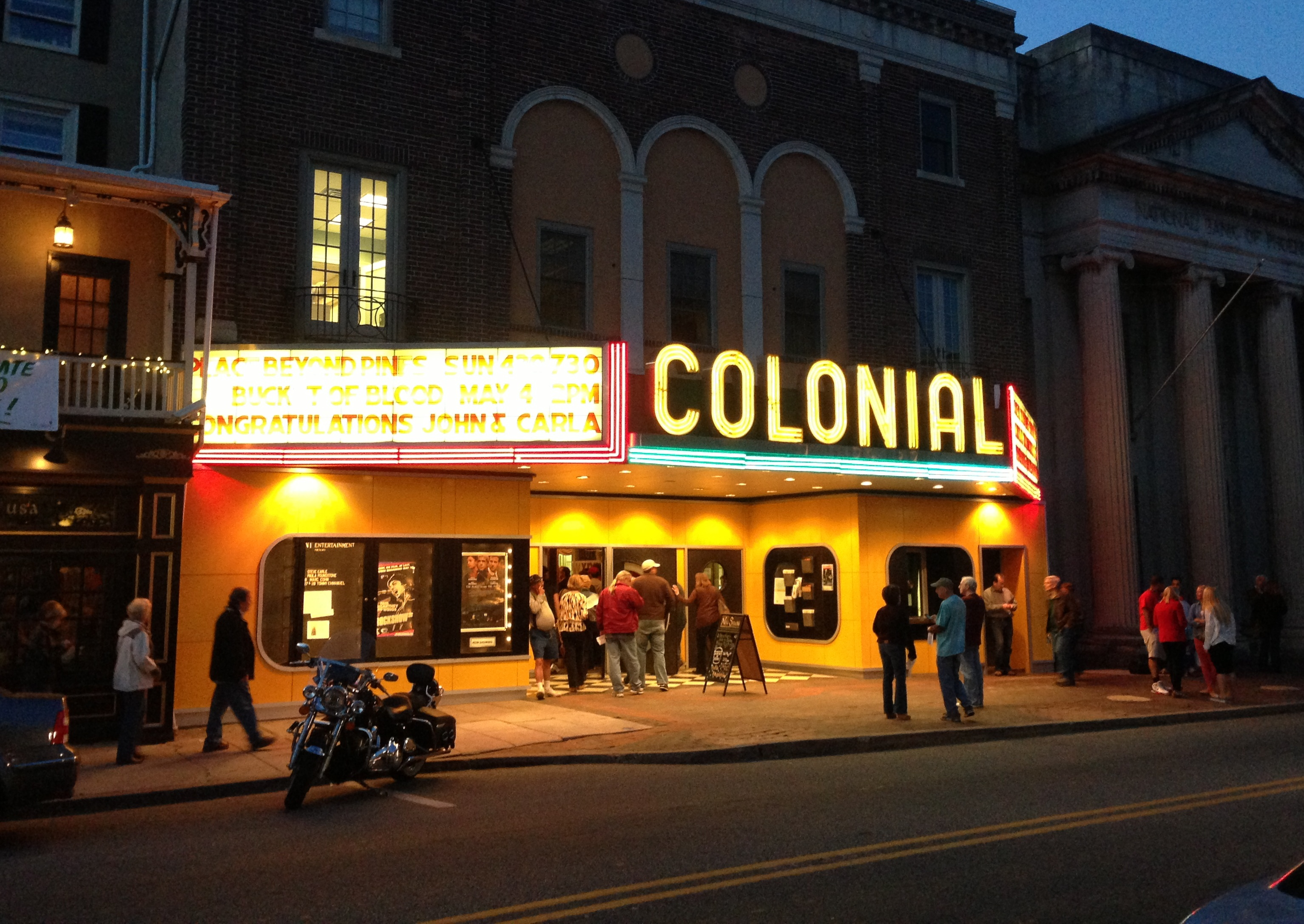
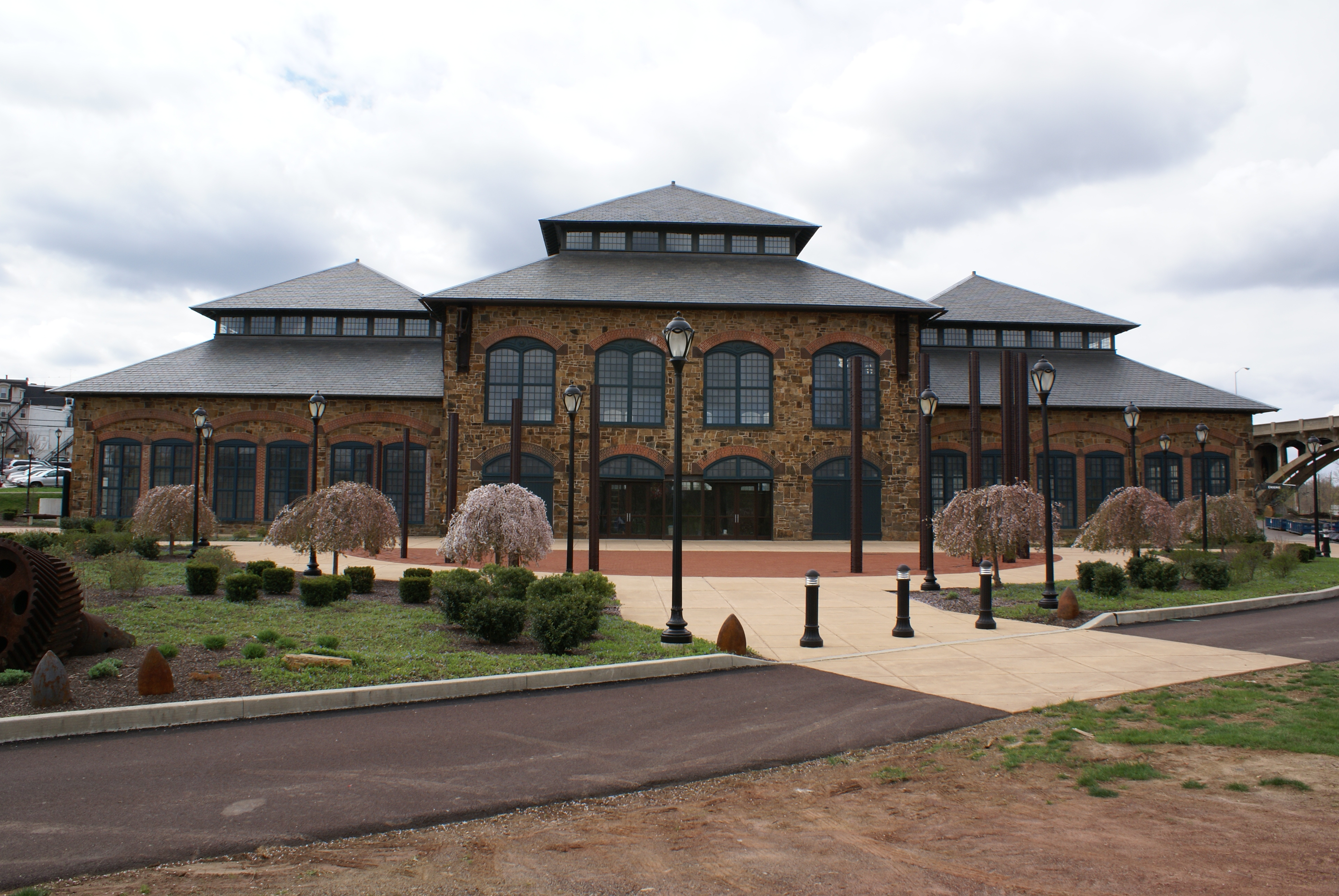
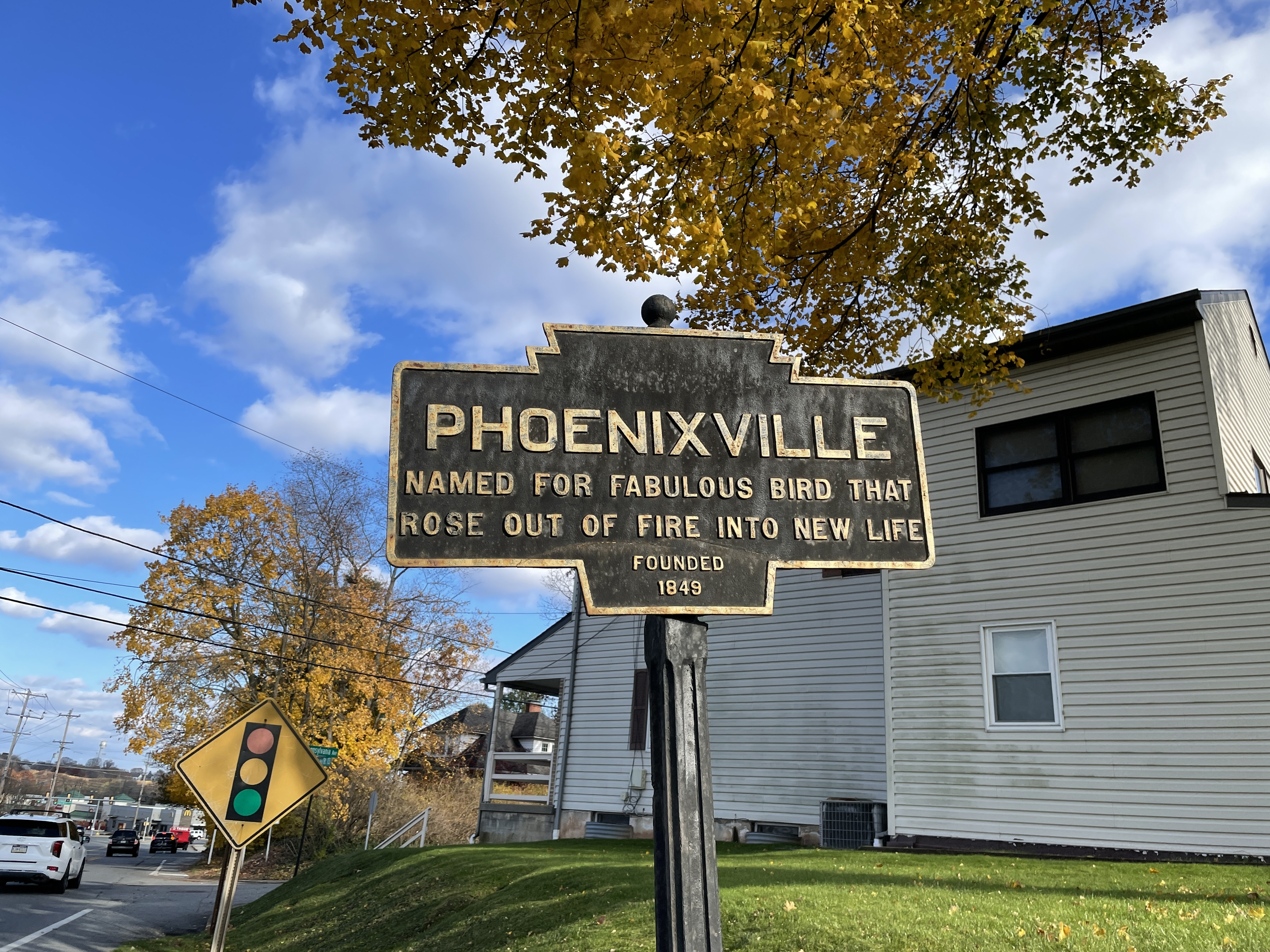
- Top to bottom: Phoenixville Historic District, The Colonial Theatre, Phoenixville Foundry, Phoenixville Keystone Marker

- Location of Phoenixville in Chester County and the state of Pennsylvania

- Location of Phoenixville in Pennsylvania Phoenixville (the United States)
- Coordinates: 40°08′07″N 75°31′22″W
- Country: United States
- State: Pennsylvania
- County: Chester
- Settled: 1732
- Incorporated: March 6, 1849
- Named for: Phoenix Iron Works

Government
  - Mayor: Peter Urscheler

Area
  - Total: 3.72 sq mi (9.63 km^{2})
  - Land: 3.51 sq mi (9.09 km^{2})
  - Water: 0.21 sq mi (0.54 km^{2})
- Elevation: 138 ft (42 m)

Population (2020)
  - Total: 18,602
  - Density: 5,299.7/sq mi (2,046.2/km^{2})
- Time zone: UTC−5 (EST)
  - Summer (DST): UTC−4 (EDT)
- ZIP Code: 19460
- Area codes: 610 and 484
- FIPS code: 42-60120
- Website: www.phoenixville.org

Phoenixville is a borough in Chester County, Pennsylvania, United States. Located in the Philadelphia metropolitan area, the borough is situated at the junction of French Creek and the Schuylkill River. The population was 18,602 at the 2020 census.

For much of its history, Phoenixville was known for being home to the Phoenix Iron Works. Following the company's closure in the 1980s and the resulting economic downturn, the town has been noted in recent years for the economic revitalization that has since taken place.

== History ==
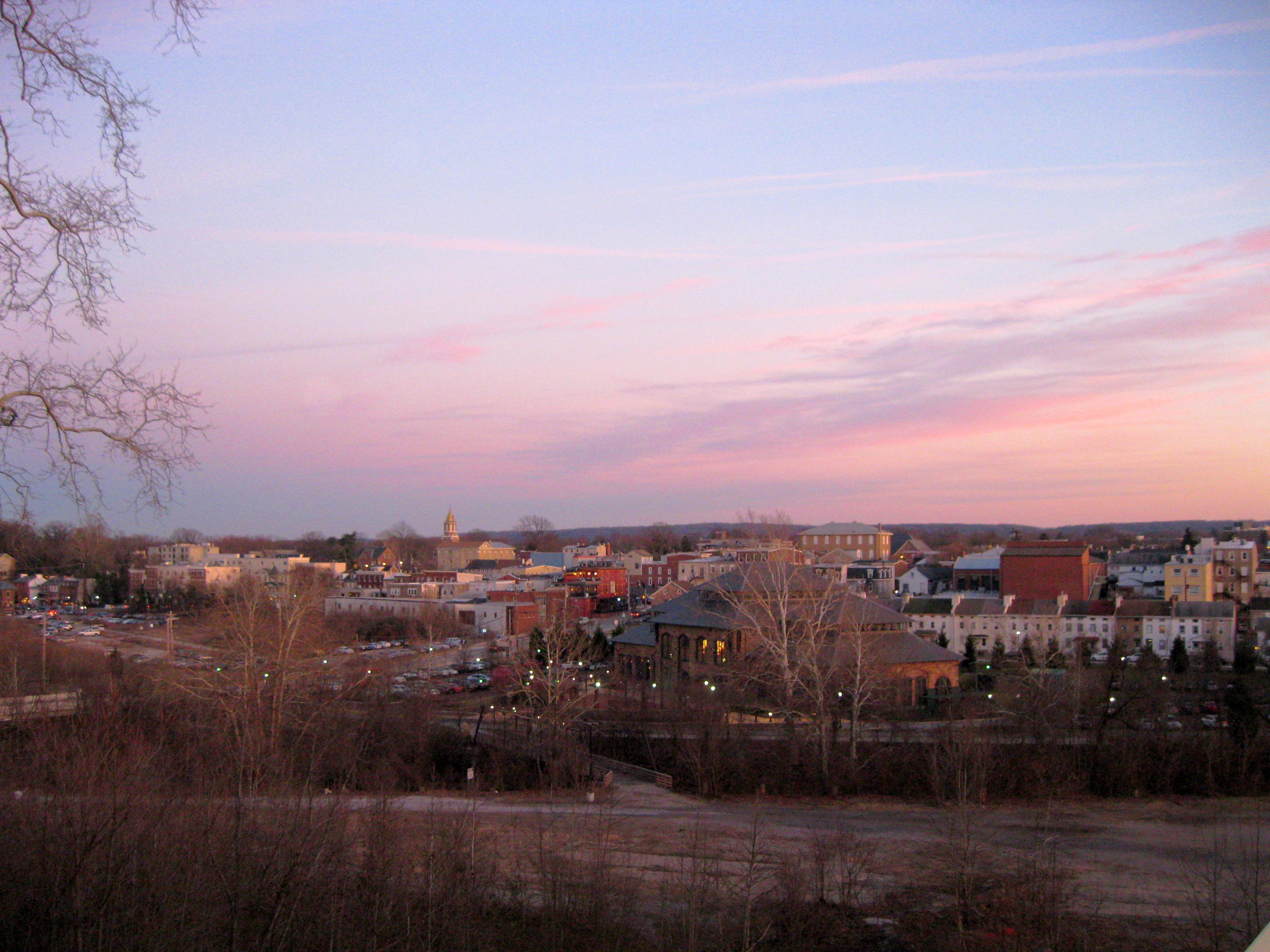
Phoenixville skyline

The Phoenixville area was originally known as Manavon, after early-Chester County judge and politician David Lloyd bought a tract of land he named "Manavon" (believed to have come from Lloyd's home parish of Manafon in Wales) in 1713. The town was originally settled in 1732, and was situated within Charlestown Township. In its early years, Manavon developed around a grist mill situated upon the banks of the French Creek. In 1790, the French Creek Nail Works (later the Phoenix Iron Works) opened as the first nail factory in the United States, and would become the economic center of the town for nearly the next two centuries, producing notable products such as the Griffen gun and the Phoenix column.

During the early 19th century, Manavon saw an influx of Irish immigrants, mainly from County Donegal, who would construct a neighborhood on the banks of the Schuylkill River named "Sceilp Level" (an Irish term meaning "water flowing over rock's edge"). These immigrants would help in the construction of the Schuylkill Canal in 1827 and the Black Rock Tunnel in 1838, which gave the north side of the town the name "Tunnel Hill". On March 6, 1849, despite public opposition, Manavon was incorporated as a borough and was renamed "Phoenixville", officially separating from Schuylkill Township, which itself had separated from Charlestown Township in 1826.

In the late 19th century and into the early 20th century, Phoenixville experienced the arrival of a second wave of immigrants, this time mainly Poles, Italians, Ukrainians, and Slovaks. By the early 20th century, other manufacturing and retail industries would arrive in Phoenixville, joining with the Phoenix Iron Company (formerly the Phoenix Iron Works). One notable type of manufacturing in Phoenixville during this time was of the famous (and now highly collectible) Etruscan majolica pottery.

After World War II, the Phoenix Iron Company (now renamed the Phoenix Steel Corporation) began to fail, and by the mid-1980s, the company was no longer producing iron and steel. The company closed permanently in 1987. The closure of the long-time hub of the town's economy resulted in an economic downturn, but beginning in the early 21st century, a town revitalization plan was put into effect which resulted in the creation of new businesses such as breweries, restaurants, and other retail outlets. The accompanying growth in population gave rise to an increase in the construction of new housing such as townhomes and apartment buildings.

Much of this history was recognized in 1987 by the creation of the Phoenixville Historic District, the largest National Register of Historic Places site in Chester County. The Black Rock Bridge, Gay Street School, and Schuylkill Navigation Canal, Oakes Reach Section are also listed on the National Register of Historic Places.

=== Etymology ===
Phoenixville is named after the Phoenix Iron Works, the major employer in the town until its closure in 1987. Originally founded in 1790 as the French Creek Nail Works, in 1813, German engineer Lewis Wernwag bought the Nail Works and renamed it the Phoenix Iron Works after he described seeing a resemblance to the mythical phoenix bird in the heat from the factory furnaces. When the borough was incorporated in 1849, it took the name of the iron works.

== Attractions ==
Phoenixville is home to the Colonial Theatre, which opened in 1903. The Colonial hosts events such as concerts and special movie showings year-round. The Colonial is celebrated for being the location of a scene in the 1958 science fiction horror film The Blob. Blobfest is celebrated every July in Phoenixville, during which attendees have the opportunity to reenact the scene from the film in which moviegoers flee the theatre in terror of the Blob loose inside. In 2017, a major expansion of the theatre incorporating the neighboring historic bank property was completed.

The Phoenixville Dogwood Festival has been celebrated in Phoenixville each May since 1943. The tradition dates back to when former Army Major General Edward C. Shannon planted a dogwood tree in Reeves Park in Phoenixville as a memorial to honor those in the Armed Forces. Each year, the festival features amusement rides, food vendors, the Dogwood Parade, and the crowning of the Dogwood Queen.

Each December since 2004, Phoenixville has held the annual Firebird Festival, a celebration of the "rebirth" of the town with the burning of a large wooden phoenix bird. The bonfire at the festival is used to harden clay birds crafted over the preceding weeks.

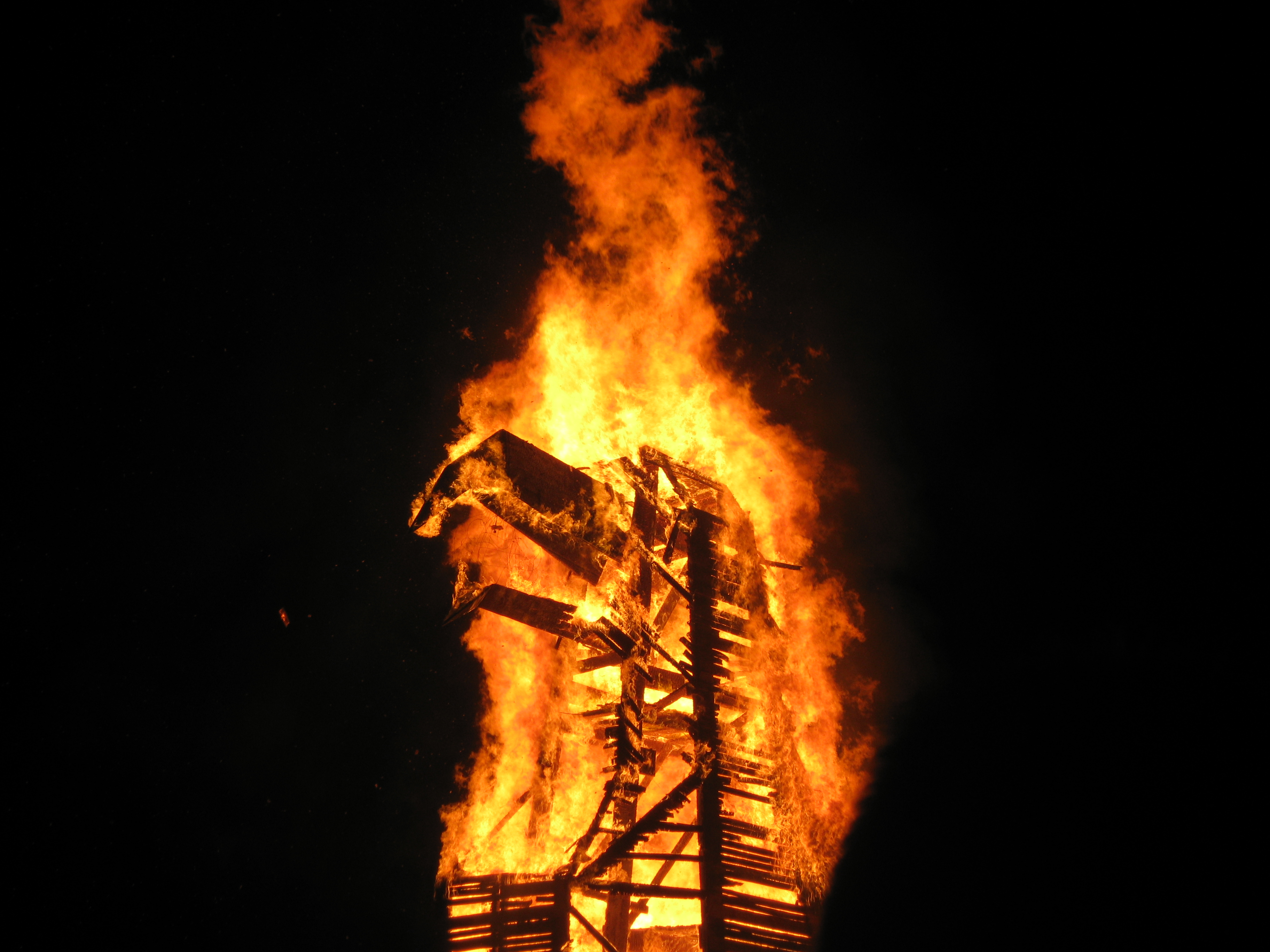
Burning of the phoenix at the Firebird Festival

Firebird: Built to Burn, an award-winning documentary that follows a year in the life of Phoenixville and the Firebird Festival, was released on Amazon Prime Video and Apple TV+ in early 2025.

A Whole Lot of LuLu, a biannual vintage and handmade flea market, is held in Phoenixville.

Phoenixville is home to over 16 parks and nature trails, including Reeves Park, Reservoir Park, Veterans Park, Pasquale "Pat" Nattle Sr. Field, and Andre Thornton Park, named after the Major League Baseball player. The borough also provides access to regional nature destinations such as Black Rock Sanctuary and the Schuylkill River Trail. Phoenixville is also near Valley Forge National Historical Park and the Perkiomen Trail.

== Economy ==
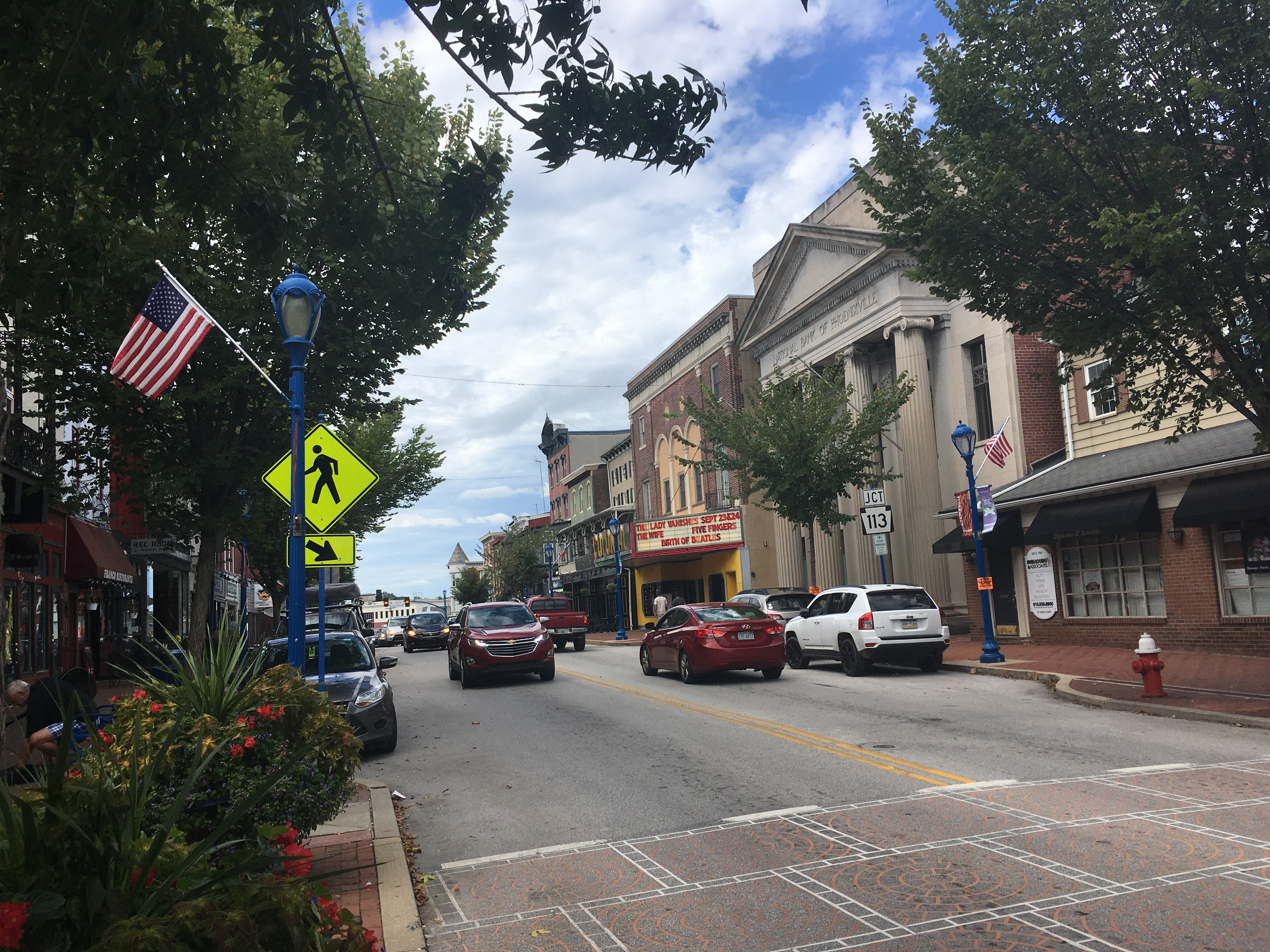
Bridge Street

For much of its history, Phoenixville's economy was centered around the Phoenix Iron Works, as much of the town's population was employed by the company. After the company's closure in 1987, the town experienced an economic downturn, as many of the former steel workers were left without jobs. Beginning in the early 21st century, plans were made to revitalize the town. Although attempts were unsuccessful at first, by the early 2010s, new restaurants, shops, and apartment buildings were constructed, mainly in the downtown area.

One result of Phoenixville's revitalization has been the arrival of several new craft breweries and distilleries. The presence of so many craft breweries has made Phoenixville a "destination-brewery location".

One impact of Phoenixville's economic revitalization has been an increase in the cost of living for residents, partially the result of increased demand for housing caused by the growth of local restaurants, breweries and boutiques in town. As a result of these issues, the Phoenixville Borough Council created the Phoenixville Affordable Housing Task Force in 2017, which then evolved into the Phoenixville Council on Affordable Housing in 2018.

In 2025, Phoenixville was ranked first on a list by Travel + Leisure magazine titled "10 Best Small Towns to Live in the U.S."

== Geography ==
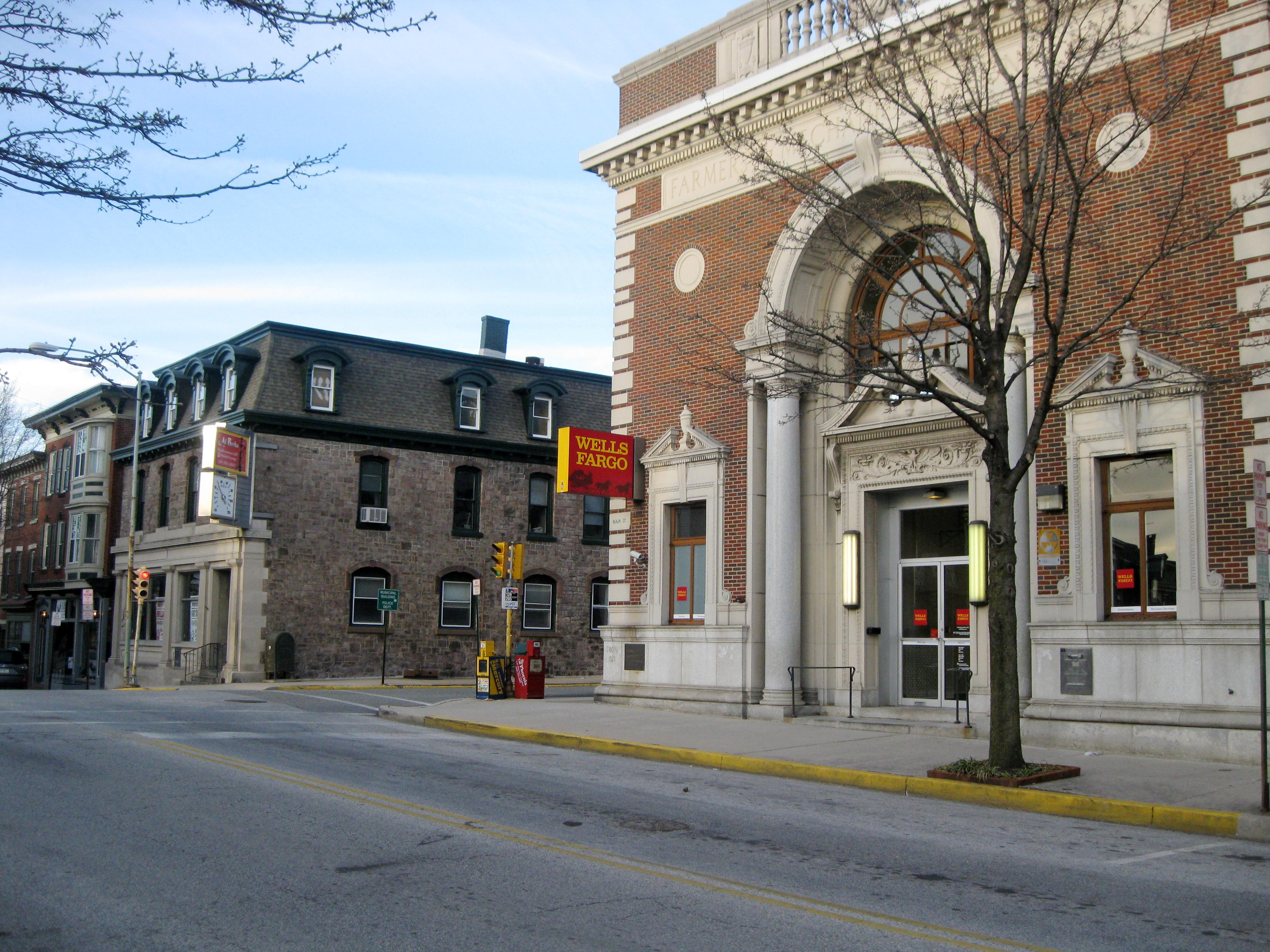
Church and Main Streets

Phoenixville is located at 40°08′07″N 75°31′22″W (40.135201, -75.522699). According to the United States Census Bureau, the borough has a total area of 3.8 square miles (9.8 km^{2}), of which 3.51 square miles (9.1 km^{2}) is land and 0.21 square miles (0.54 km^{2}) (4.27%) is water.

Phoenixville borders East Pikeland Township to the west, Schuylkill Township to the south and east, and Upper Providence Township to the north and east.

The Schuylkill River forms most of the northern and eastern borders of the borough. French Creek branches off from the Schuylkill on the eastern end of the borough and runs directly through the center of the borough. The creek is considered the dividing line between the north and south sides of the borough.

=== Climate ===
Phoenixville lies on the Dfa (humid continental) climate zone of the Köppen climate classification, immediately bordering upon the Cfa (humid subtropical) zone.

Phoenixville is located in USDA Plant Hardiness Zone 6b.

Annual precipitation averages 43.3 inches (110 cm), and annual snowfall averages 16.3 inches (41 cm).

Phoenixville is home to the highest recorded temperature in Pennsylvania history, 111 °F (44 °C), set on July 10, 1936.

Climate data for Phoenixville 1 E, Pennsylvania (1991–2020 normals, extremes 1893–present)
Month	Jan	Feb	Mar	Apr	May	Jun	Jul	Aug	Sep	Oct	Nov	Dec	Year
Record high °F (°C)	77 (25)	79 (26)	90 (32)	95 (35)	99 (37)	104 (40)	111 (44)	104 (40)	105 (41)	100 (38)	86 (30)	77 (25)	111 (44)
Mean daily maximum °F (°C)	41.0 (5.0)	43.7 (6.5)	52.6 (11.4)	65.1 (18.4)	75.1 (23.9)	83.3 (28.5)	87.7 (30.9)	86.0 (30.0)	79.0 (26.1)	67.3 (19.6)	55.7 (13.2)	45.4 (7.4)	65.2 (18.4)
Daily mean °F (°C)	31.9 (−0.1)	33.8 (1.0)	41.9 (5.5)	53.1 (11.7)	63.0 (17.2)	72.1 (22.3)	76.9 (24.9)	75.2 (24.0)	67.6 (19.8)	55.7 (13.2)	45.1 (7.3)	36.4 (2.4)	54.4 (12.4)
Mean daily minimum °F (°C)	22.8 (−5.1)	23.8 (−4.6)	31.2 (−0.4)	41.0 (5.0)	51.0 (10.6)	60.9 (16.1)	66.1 (18.9)	64.3 (17.9)	56.3 (13.5)	44.2 (6.8)	34.4 (1.3)	27.3 (−2.6)	43.6 (6.4)
Record low °F (°C)	−19 (−28)	−16 (−27)	−2 (−19)	11 (−12)	27 (−3)	33 (1)	42 (6)	34 (1)	28 (−2)	18 (−8)	−1 (−18)	−8 (−22)	−19 (−28)
Average precipitation inches (mm)	3.15 (80)	2.87 (73)	3.67 (93)	3.52 (89)	3.30 (84)	3.85 (98)	4.57 (116)	4.37 (111)	4.43 (113)	3.91 (99)	3.41 (87)	4.08 (104)	45.13 (1,146)
Average precipitation days (≥ 0.01 in)	9.3	8.7	9.8	10.3	9.8	9.3	9.8	8.4	7.5	8.1	7.7	10.2	108.9
Source: NOAA

== Demographics ==
Historical population
Census	Pop.	Note	%±
1850	2,670		—
1860	4,886		83.0%
1870	5,292		8.3%
1880	6,682		26.3%
1890	8,514		27.4%
1900	9,196		8.0%
1910	10,473		13.9%
1920	10,484		0.1%
1930	12,029		14.7%
1940	12,282		2.1%
1950	12,932		5.3%
1960	13,797		6.7%
1970	14,823		7.4%
1980	14,165		−4.4%
1990	15,066		6.4%
2000	14,788		−1.8%
2010	16,440		11.2%
2020	18,602		13.2%
2022 (est.)	19,354	▲	4.0%

=== 2020 census ===
As of the 2020 census, Phoenixville had a population of 18,602. The median age was 35.2 years. 19.2% of residents were under the age of 18 and 12.4% of residents were 65 years of age or older. For every 100 females there were 102.6 males, and for every 100 females age 18 and over there were 102.0 males age 18 and over.

100.0% of residents lived in urban areas, while 0.0% lived in rural areas.

There were 8,444 households in Phoenixville, of which 23.8% had children under the age of 18 living in them. Of all households, 35.6% were married-couple households, 25.8% were households with a male householder and no spouse or partner present, and 28.4% were households with a female householder and no spouse or partner present. About 37.3% of all households were made up of individuals and 10.5% had someone living alone who was 65 years of age or older.

There were 8,888 housing units, of which 5.0% were vacant. The homeowner vacancy rate was 0.8% and the rental vacancy rate was 5.5%.

Racial composition as of the 2020 census
Race	Number	Percent
White	14,051	75.5%
Black or African American	1,121	6.0%
American Indian and Alaska Native	107	0.6%
Asian	594	3.2%
Native Hawaiian and Other Pacific Islander	4	0.0%
Some other race	1,204	6.5%
Two or more races	1,521	8.2%
Hispanic or Latino (of any race)	2,035	10.9%

=== 2010 census ===
As of the census of 2010, there were 16,440 people, 7,590 households. There were 6,793 housing units at an average density of 1,892.6/sq mi (730.6/km^{2}).

The racial makeup of the borough was 78.0% White, 8.6% African American, 0.2% American Indian, 3.5% Asian, 0.2% Pacific Islander, 2.6% two or more races, and Hispanic or Latino of any race were 7.4% of the population.

=== Income and poverty ===
The median income for a household in the borough was $56,704, and the median income for a family was $71,005.

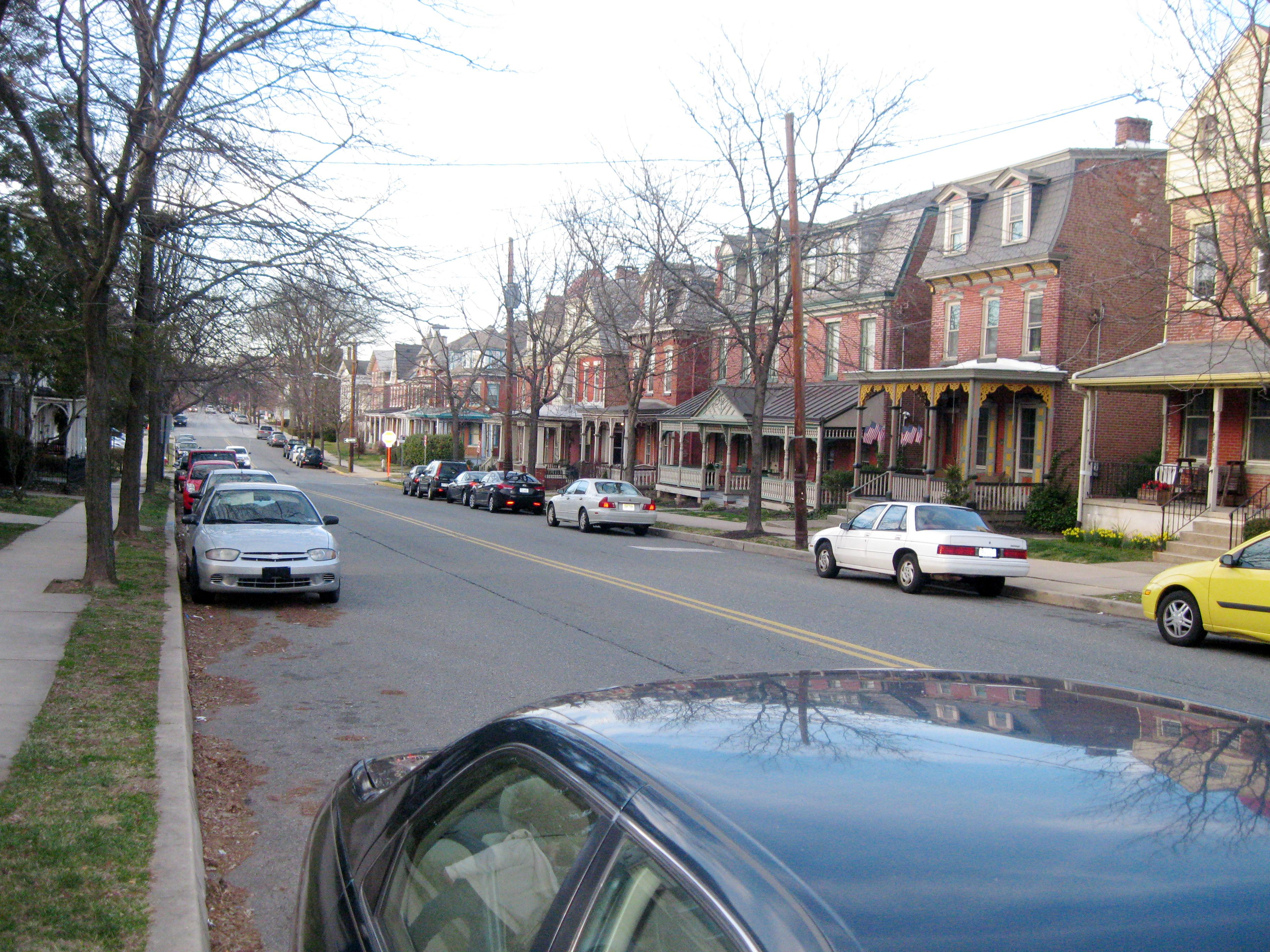
Residential area on Main Street

== Transportation ==
=== Roads and highways ===
As of 2019, there were 53.89 miles (86.73 km) of public roads in Phoenixville, of which 7.10 miles (11.43 km) were maintained by Pennsylvania Department of Transportation (PennDOT) and 46.79 miles (75.30 km) were maintained by the borough.

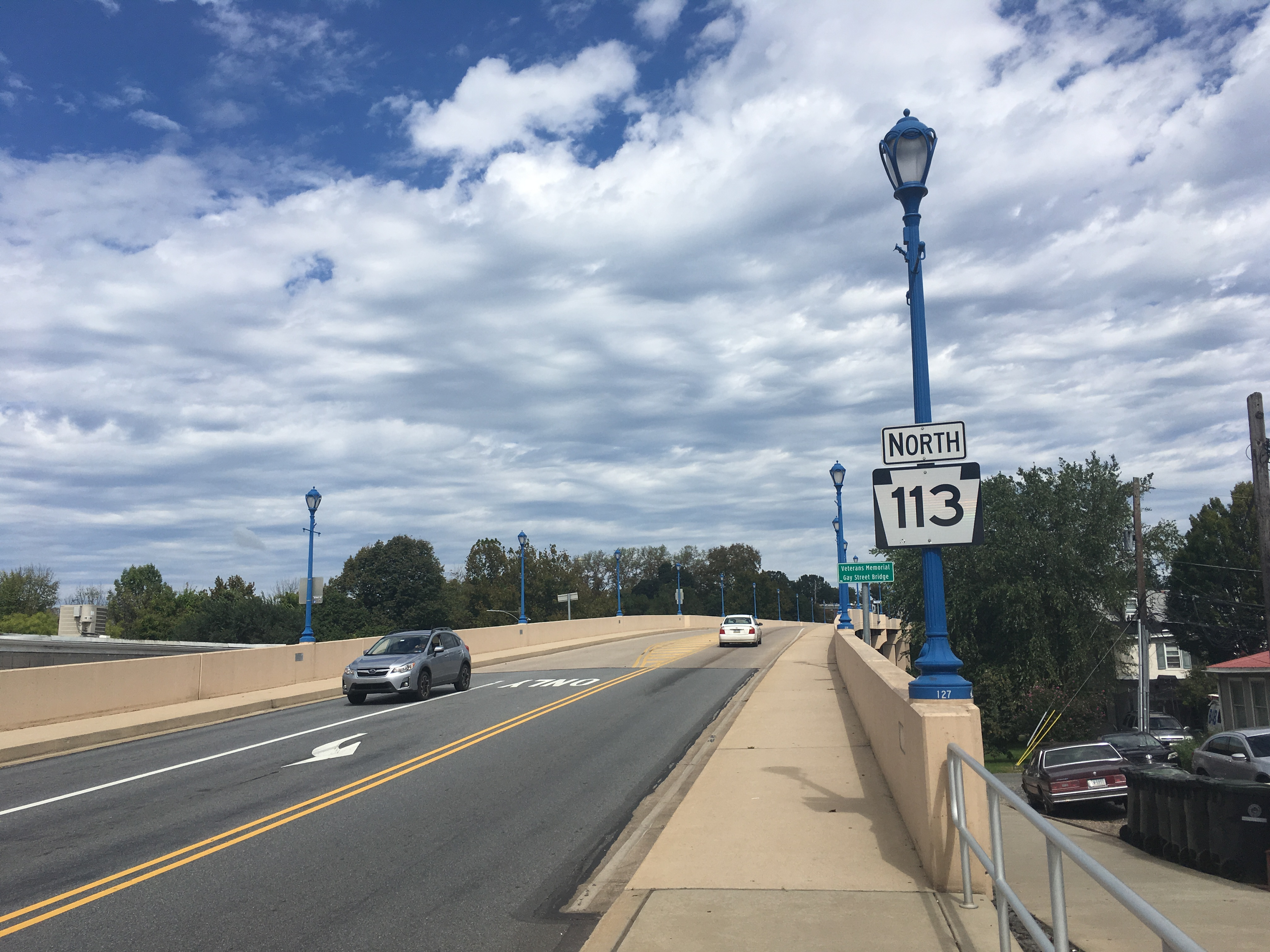
PA 113 crossing French Creek at the Gay Street Bridge

Phoenixville is served by three state highways: Pennsylvania Route 23, Pennsylvania Route 113, and Pennsylvania Route 29. PA 23 follows a northwest-to-southeast alignment through western and southern sections of the borough via Nutt Road. PA 23 heads northwest to Elverson and southeast to King of Prussia. PA 113 follows a southwest-to-northeast alignment through western and northern parts of the borough via Kimberton Road, Nutt Road, Bridge Street, Gay Street, Franklin Avenue, Emmett Street, Dayton Street, Freemont Street and Black Rock Road. PA 113 heads southwest to Downingtown, and northeast to Trappe. PA 23 and PA 113 share a short concurrency in the western portion of the borough on Nutt Road. Finally, PA 29 follows a southwest-to-northeast alignment through southern and eastern sections of the borough via Main Street, Manavon Street, Starr Street and Bridge Street. PA 29 heads southwest to Malvern, providing access to the Pennsylvania Turnpike, and northeast to Collegeville, providing access to U.S. Route 422. Less than a mile northwest of the Phoenixville borough is the eastern terminus of Pennsylvania Route 724 at an intersection with PA 23. Although not within the borders of the borough, PA 724 provides a connection for the Phoenixville area to Pottstown.

=== Public transportation ===
Phoenixville is currently served by two of SEPTA's Suburban Division bus routes. The Route 99 bus connects Phoenixville with the Manayunk/Norristown Line Regional Rail service at the Norristown Transportation Center, and the Route 139 bus connects Phoenixville with the King of Prussia Mall and Limerick.

Several major railroads once served Phoenixville. The Reading Company Main Line entered the east side of town via a station above Bridge Street. The line passes under the north side of town in the Black Rock Tunnel, the third railroad tunnel constructed in the United States. Regular commuter trains last stopped at the Phoenixville station in 1981, when SEPTA ceased operating non-electrified commuter lines, and the former station is now used as an event space. Norfolk Southern Railway (NS) currently utilizes the line on a daily basis as part of its Harrisburg Line. Phoenixville was also where the former Pickering Valley Railroad joined the Reading. The Pickering Valley was operated as a subsidiary of the Reading that connected Phoenixville to Byers, near Eagle. In 1906, the railroad was formally merged into the Reading, and became the Pickering Valley Branch of that railroad. The branch was closed in the late 20th century, and most of the track has been removed.

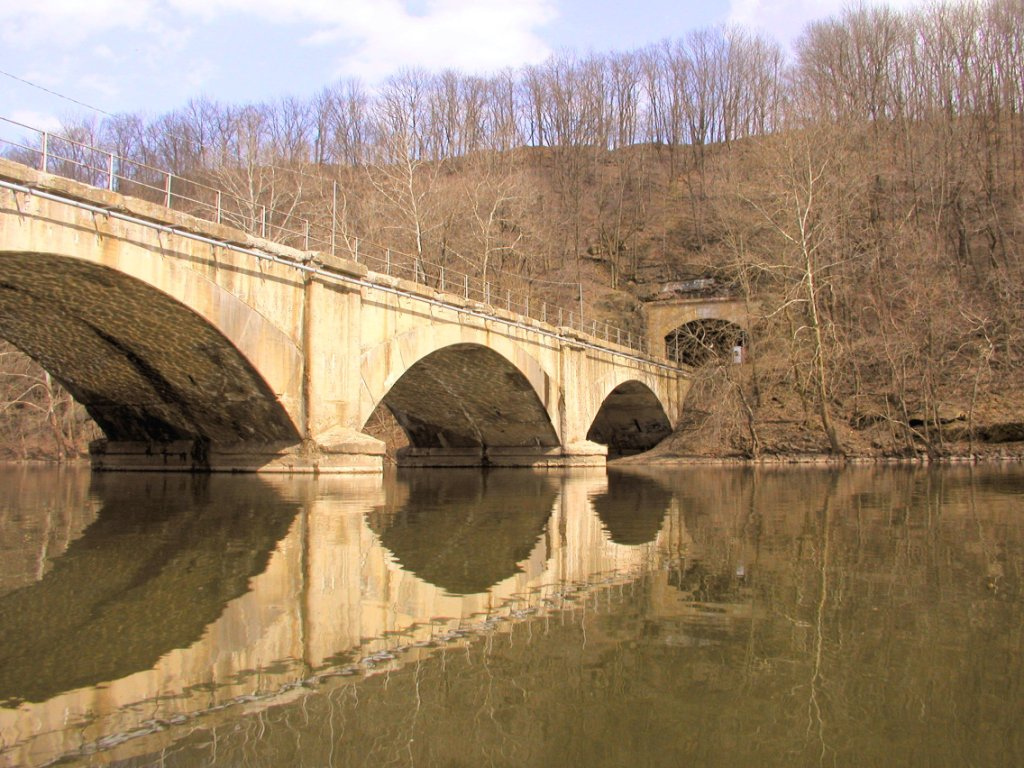
North portal of the Black Rock Tunnel

The Pennsylvania Railroad (PRR) Schuylkill Branch also served Phoenixville. The line enters town crossing the Schuylkill River from neighboring Mont Clare on a high bridge, north of French Creek. The line passes along the north side of the former Phoenix Iron Works site. The station southwest of the intersection of Vanderslice and Gay Street, no longer exists. Past the Iron Works, the line splits, with the main fork turning north and passing through the now abandoned Phoenixville Tunnel, which partially collapsed in the 1990s, and continuing northwest of the town toward Reading. The other fork, which served as the former Phoenixville Branch of the PRR, turns southwest, continuing along the Pickering Creek Valley and joining the former PRR Main Line in Frazer. A section of the line remains in place, and is currently known as the Phoenixville Industrial Track (owned by Norfolk Southern). Passenger service on the line had ceased by the end of the 20th century, and regular freight service on the line ceased in 2004. During the 2008 replacement of the Gay Street Bridge, the line was severed at its crossing of Main Street and the rail bridge over Main Street was later raised by 14 inches to allow better access for emergency vehicles.

Former Reading Company station

Beginning in 2000, interest to resume passenger rail service in Phoenixville was spurred by the Schuylkill Valley Metro (SVM) project, which would have connected Phoenixville to Reading and Philadelphia. However, funding for the project was ultimately rejected in 2006. Shortly after, another project called the Greenline, led by the group Citizens for the Train, was proposed as an alternative to the SVM. It would have utilized the Phoenixville Industrial Track and the former Phoenixville Branch of the Pennsylvania Railroad to give Phoenixville a rail connection to Oaks and Paoli, which could then be used to connect to Philadelphia via the Paoli/Thorndale Line of SEPTA Regional Rail. However, no funding was ever allocated to move the project forward.

In mid-2018, Phoenixville began a study to restore SEPTA passenger rail service to connect Phoenixville to Norristown, which would then connect to Philadelphia. In 2020, PennDOT finalized a study to extend passenger rail service from Norristown to Reading, which would include a stop in Phoenixville. In 2021, Amtrak revealed a similar plan that would allow rail service from Reading to New York City, which would also include a stop in Phoenixville. In 2022, the Schuylkill River Passenger Rail Authority was created to advance the project forward, with Phoenixville mayor Peter Urscheler serving as one of three authority members for Chester County.

== Government ==
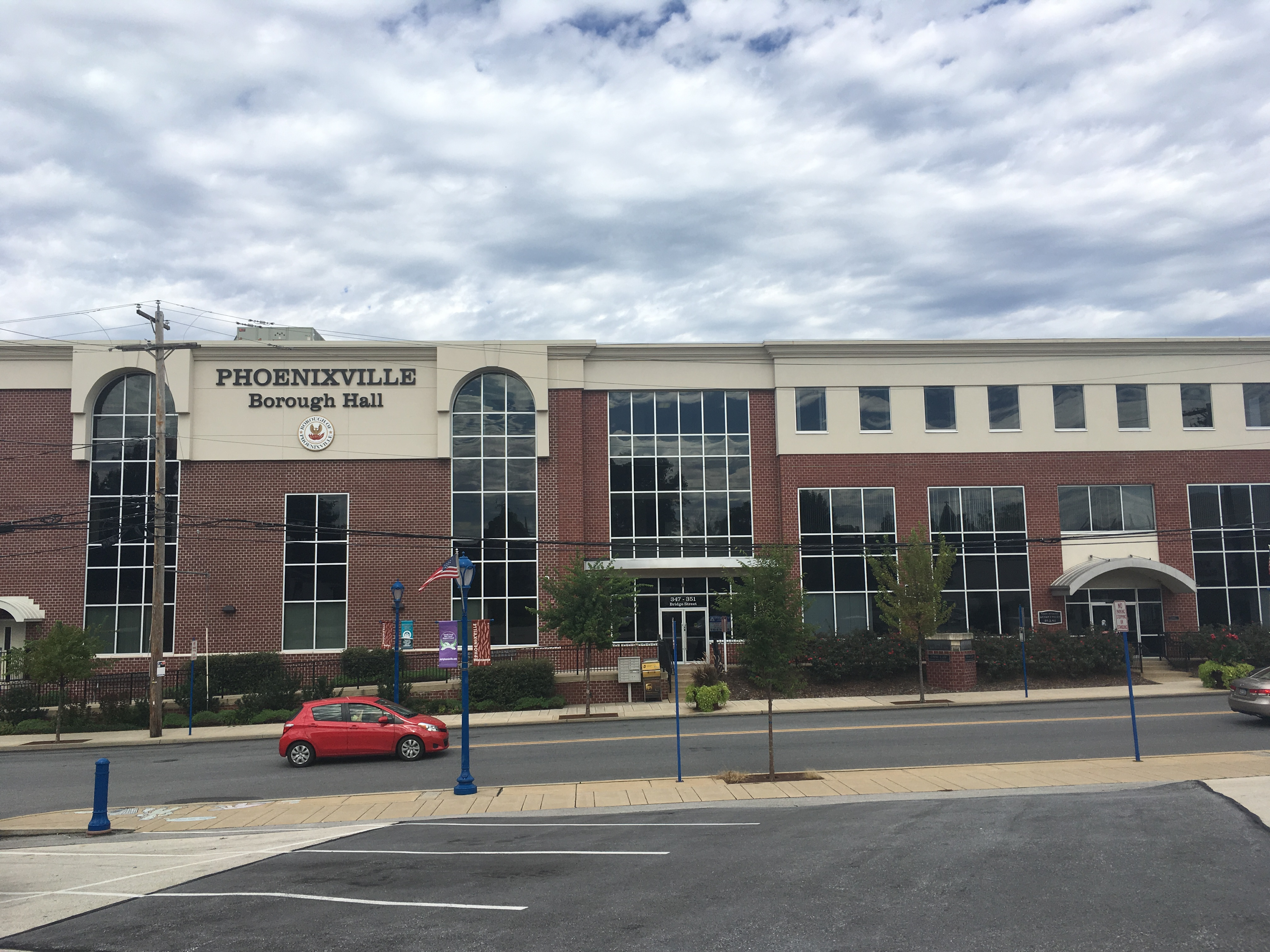
Phoenixville Borough Hall

Phoenixville is governed by a mayor and a borough council. The Borough Council consists of eight members, two for each of four wards: North, East, Middle, and West. Each ward is further divided into three numbered election precincts.

In Pennsylvania boroughs, the Borough Council serves as the legislative body, responsible for enacting ordinances, adopting budgets, and setting policies for the borough. The Mayor oversees the police department, directing the time, place, and manner in which the police perform their duties. The Borough Manager, appointed by the council, handles the day-to-day administration of borough departments.

The current mayor of Phoenixville is Peter Urscheler, having served since January 2, 2018.

=== Borough Council members ===
As of June 1, 2026

Ward	Council member	Party	Position	Term ends
Middle	Jonathan M. Ewald	Democratic	President	2027
Middle	Beth Burckley	Democratic	Vice President	2029
West	Brian Moore	Democratic	Assistant Secretary	2027
East	Tanya Vogel	Democratic		2029
West	Dana Dugan	Democratic		2029
North	Koretta McGhee	Democratic		2029
North	Klemintina Budnik	Democratic		2027
East	Brian Weiss	Democratic		2027

Phoenixville is part of Pennsylvania's 6th congressional District (represented by Chrissy Houlahan), District 26 of the Pennsylvania House of Representatives (represented by Paul Friel), and District 44 of the Pennsylvania Senate (represented by Katie Muth).

== Education ==
=== Public school ===
Phoenixville is served by the Phoenixville Area School District, which also serves the surrounding municipalities of East Pikeland and Schuylkill Townships. The district has an early learning center and three elementary schools, Barkley, Manavon, and Schuylkill, each serving sections of the borough. Phoenixville Area Middle School and Phoenixville Area High School serve the entire borough and school district for secondary education. High school students can choose to attend the Chester County Intermediate Unit (CCIU) Technical College High School Pickering Campus for specific hands-on training in particular fields of study.

=== Private schools ===
Holy Family School, a K–8 school of the Roman Catholic Archdiocese of Philadelphia, is located in the borough. It opened in 1922, and has an enrollment of 255 as of 2021.

=== Charter schools ===
Renaissance Academy Charter School, a K-12 charter school, is located in the borough. It opened in 2000 and moved to its current location on the north side in 2015. The enrollment of the school is approximately 1060 students.

=== Higher education ===
The campus of the University of Valley Forge, which has a Phoenixville postal address, is located partially in Charlestown Township, and partially in Schuylkill Township. It is less than 1 mile (1.6 km) outside the border of the Phoenixville borough.

The Phoenixville campus of the Lansdale School of Business is located in the borough.

=== Public libraries ===
Phoenixville Public Library serves as the community library. It is a Carnegie library, and today it is one of 18 libraries in the Chester County Library System. As of 2022, the library owned 57,537 physical items (not including electronic resources).

== Media ==
=== Newspapers ===
The Daily Local News is a newspaper that covers local news throughout Chester County, including Phoenixville.

=== Radio ===
WPHE-AM (690), branded as Radio Salvación, is a Spanish Christian radio station that broadcasts from Phoenixville.

=== Television ===
Voxipop is an online television channel that produces original programming and news based around the Phoenixville area.

== Notable people ==
=== Sports ===
- Rick Allain, former ice hockey player and coach
- Creighton Gubanich, former Major League Baseball player with the Boston Red Sox
- Hadley Hartmetz, professional ice hockey player for the Boston Fleet
- Rich Kraynak, former linebacker for the Philadelphia Eagles
- Rob Lohr, football player
- Kevin Negandhi, ESPN anchor
- Neal Olkewicz, football player
- Mike Piazza, Hall of Fame MLB catcher
- John Smiley, MLB pitcher
- André Thornton, former Major League Baseball player; recipient of the 1979 Roberto Clemente Award
- Jake Walker, racing driver
- Frank Zinn, baseball player

=== Entertainment ===
- Kevin Bacon, actor from Philadelphia, spent weekends at his grandmother's home in Phoenixville
- Terry Gilkyson, song composer, writer of "Memories Are Made of This", "Greenfields", "The Cry of the Wild Goose"
- Jerry Spinelli, writer
- Jack Wall, video game soundtrack composer
- David White, actor
- William George Wilson, sports cinematographer

=== Other ===
- Everett W. Anderson, soldier who received Medal of Honor during the American Civil War
- Raymond P. Coffman, USMC Major general, served with 1st Marine Division during World War II
- James F. Crow, prominent population geneticist and Professor Emeritus at the University of Wisconsin
- Elizabeth Wendell Ewing, Civil War nurse
- Levi B. Kaler (1828–1906), businessman and member of the Pennsylvania House of Representatives
- Samuel W. Pennypacker, soldier, writer and 23rd Governor of Pennsylvania
- Rebecca Lane Pennypacker Price, Civil War nurse, philanthropist

== In popular culture ==
- Parts of the borough, including the Colonial Theatre, Barkley Elementary School, and a home on the corner of South Main Street and 3rd Avenue, were featured in the 1958 science fiction horror film The Blob, starring Steve McQueen.
- The "G" Lodge, a diner in Phoenixville off PA 23, was featured in a scene in the 2008 thriller film The Happening, starring Mark Wahlberg and directed by M. Night Shyamalan, who was raised in neighboring Montgomery County.
- The Fisherman Restaurant, a now-closed seafood diner in Phoenixville off PA 23, was featured in a scene in the 2016 psychological thriller film Split, starring James McAvoy and directed by M. Night Shyamalan.
