= List of tunnels in Pennsylvania =

The following is a list of tunnels in Pennsylvania.

== Rail tunnels ==
- Acheson Tunnel, Pittsburgh and West Virginia Railway, Washington County
- Allegheny River Tunnel, Pittsburgh Light Rail, Pittsburgh
- Benford Tunnel, CSX Transportation, Confluence, daylighted in 2012
- Big Savage Tunnel, 3,294 feet (1,004 m) Wellersburg, was Western Maryland Railway, now Rails-to-trails
- Bow Ridge Tunnel (1864), Pennsylvania Railroad, Westmoreland County
- Bow Ridge Tunnel (1907), Pennsylvania Railroad, 630 feet (190 m) Westmoreland County
- Buxton Tunnel, Pittsburgh and West Virginia Railway, Avella, Washington County, one mile east of the West Virginia border
- Black Rock Tunnel, 1,931 feet (589 m), Phoenixville, Reading Railroad
- Broad Street Tunnel, carrying the Broad Street Subway under Broad Street but over submerged US 1.
- Brook Tunnel, CSX Transportation
- Buck Mountain Coal Company Gravity Railroad Tunnel, 135 feet (41 m), Carbon County (abandoned)
- Carr's Tunnel Pennsylvania Railroad Greensburg, Pennsylvania
- Catasauqua Tunnel, Lehigh and New England Railroad (abandoned), Catasauqua, Lehigh County, both portals covered, 735 feet
- Center City Commuter Connection Tunnel, Philadelphia, SEPTA
- Coburn Tunnel, Centre County, Pennsylvania Railroad (abandoned, now part of Penns Creek Trail)
- Columbia Tunnel, Columbia, Pennsylvania Railroad (Columbia Branch) (abandoned)
- Conococheague Mountain Tunnel, Path Valley Railroad, Perry County (incomplete, abandoned 100 feet (30 m) from north portal)
- Cork Run Tunnel, Pennsylvania Railroad, Pittsburgh
- Craighead Tunnel, Pittsburgh and West Virginia Railway, Avella, Washington County, 2 miles (3.2 km) east of the West Virginia border near Buxton and Stateline Tunnels.
- Crown Avenue Tunnel, 4,747 feet (1,447 m), Scranton, Lackawanna and Wyoming Valley Railroad (now Electric City Trolley)
- Dillinger Tunnel, Emmaus, Reading Railroad (Perkiomen Branch)
- Factoryville Tunnels, 2,250 feet (690 m), east tunnel built in 1851, west tunnel built in 1883, both abandoned in 1915. (Delaware, Lackawanna, and Western Railroad,) Factoryville to Nicholson
- Falls Cut Tunnel, CSX Transportation
- Flat Rock Tunnel, 937 feet (286 m), Gladwyne, Reading Railroad (aside of and visible from the Schuylkill Expressway)
- Friendship Tunnel, Clearfield County, New York Central Railroad (abandoned)
- Fulton Tunnel, Clearfield, New York Central Railroad
- Gallitzin Tunnel, 3,605 feet (1,099 m), Pennsylvania Railroad, through Allegheny Mountain and under the Eastern Continental Divide
- Girard Tunnel, Girardville and Big Mine Run, Pennsylvania, Mill Creek Mine Railroad (abandoned)
- Grays Ferry Tunnel, CSX, Grays Ferry, Philadelphia
- Greer Tunnel, Norfolk Southern, Washington County
- Gwynedd Tunnel, North Wales, Pennsylvania, North Pennsylvania Railroad, daylighted by the Reading Company when electrified in 1931.
- Hauto Tunnel, Lansford, Lehigh and New England Railroad (abandoned), 3800 feet
- Hickory Tunnel, Pittsburgh and West Virginia Railway, Washington County
- Hogback Tunnel, Centre County, Beech Creek Railroad
- Howard Tunnel, Northern Central Railway, New Salem, second oldest active U.S. railroad tunnel, constructed in 1837, now on the York County Heritage Rail Trail
- Hoyt Tunnel, Clearfield County, New York Central Railroad (abandoned)
- Jacks Mountain Tunnel, Adams County, was Western Maryland Railway, now CSX
- Jeddo Rail Road Tunnel, Hazle Brook, Reading and Northern Railroad (former Lehigh Valley Railroad)
- J&L Tunnel, CSX Transportation, Pittsburgh
- Karthaus Tunnel, Karthaus, Clearfield County, New York Central Railroad
- Lake Shore Tunnel, Oil City (abandoned)
- Lofty Tunnel, 1,100 feet (340 m), Schuylkill County, Reading Railroad, under Broad Mountain and the divide between the Delaware and Susquehanna River watersheds (abandoned)
- Mahanoy Tunnel, 4,000 feet (1,200 m), Mahanoy City, Reading Railroad, under Broad Mountain and the divide between the Delaware and Susquehanna River watersheds
- Market Street Tunnel (West Philadelphia and Center City Philadelphia), carrying rapid transit and streetcars under Market Street and the Schuylkill River
- Market Street Tunnel (West Philadelphia), carrying commuter rail trains under 32nd Street, and including an abandoned branch
- McGugin Tunnel, Pittsburgh and West Virginia Railway, Washington County
- Montour Tunnel, Montour Railroad, Washington County abandoned.
- Mount Cobb Tunnel, 755 feet (230 m), constructed 1850, used until 1885. Pennsylvania Coal Company Gravity Railroad, Mt. Cobb, Lackawanna County (abandoned)
- Nay Aug Tunnel, Dunmore, Delaware, Lackawanna, and Western Railroad
- Negro Mountain Tunnel, initial construction done for the South Pennsylvania Railroad, but later omitted from the Pennsylvania Turnpike.
- Nicholson Tunnel, Built by Delaware, Lackawanna, and Western Railroad in 1915, Factoryville to Nicholson Still used by Canadian Pacific Railway, and Norfolk Southern Railway trackage rights trains.
- Panther Hollow Tunnel, CSX Transportation, Pittsburgh
- Peale Tunnel, 1,277 feet (389 m), Centre County, Beech Creek Railroad (abandoned - now part of Snow Shoe Rail-Trail)
- Penobscot Mountain Tunnel, Wilkes-Barre and Hazleton Railway, Nuangola, Pennsylvania (2,700 feet (820 m), abandoned, north portal filled below I-81)
- Perkasie Tunnel, Perkasie, Reading Railroad (Bethlehem Branch)
- Pinkerton Tunnel, Pinkerton, Somerset County, Western Maryland Railway (abandoned - now part of Great Allegheny Passage) rail-trail
- Pinkerton Tunnel, Pinkerton, Somerset County, B&O Railroad, now CSX Transportation was daylighted in 2012
- Phoenixville Tunnel (a.k.a. Fairview Tunnel), 811 feet (247 m), Phoenixville, Pennsylvania Railroad (Schuylkill Valley Branch) (abandoned)
- Poe Paddy Tunnel, Centre County, Pennsylvania Railroad (abandoned - now part of Penns Creek Trail)
- Pottsville Tunnel, Pottsville, Pennsylvania Railroad (Schuylkill Valley Branch) (abandoned)
- Pulpit Rock Tunnel, 1,637 feet (499 m), Port Clinton, Reading Railroad (abandoned), constructed 1838
- Quemahoning Mountain Tunnel, Pittsburgh, Westmoreland and Somerset Railroad, omitted from the Pennsylvania Turnpike
- Radebaugh Tunnel, west of Greensburg, Pennsylvania Railroad, daylighted
- Rockport Tunnel, Rockport, Carbon County, Lehigh Valley Railroad (in Lehigh Gorge State Park, south portal visible from towpath across the river)
- Sabula Tunnels, Pennsylvania Railroad and Baltimore and Ohio Railroad, Clearfield County (go under the Eastern Continental Divide)
- Saint Clair Tunnel, St. Clair, Pennsylvania Railroad (abandoned)
- Saltsburg Tunnel, Norfolk Southern Railway, Saltsburg
- Sand Patch Tunnel, Somerset County, under the Eastern Continental Divide:
  - First tunnel (1871), 4,777 feet (1,456 m), Pittsburgh and Connellsville Railroad (later Baltimore and Ohio Railroad) (abandoned)
  - Second tunnel (1913), 4,475 feet (1,364 m), Baltimore and Ohio Railroad (now CSX Transportation)
- Schenley Tunnel, P&W Subdivision, Pittsburgh
- Shawville Tunnel, Shawville, Clearfield County, New York Central Railroad
- Shoofly Tunnel, CSX Transportation, daylighted in 2012, Confluence
- Shuman Tunnel, Mainville, Columbia County, Reading Railroad (Catawissa Branch) (abandoned)
- Sideling Hill Tunnel, 6,782 feet (2,067 m), former Pennsylvania Turnpike, Fulton County
- Sideling Hill Tunnel (1874), 830 feet (250 m), East Broad Top Railroad, Huntingdon County
- Spruce Creek Tunnels, Pennsylvania Railroad, Huntingdon County
- Staple Bend Tunnel, first U.S. railroad tunnel, 901 feet (275 m), Allegheny Portage Railroad, Conemaugh Township, Cambria County (abandoned but now part of the historic Allegheny Portage Railroad)
- State Line Tunnel, Pittsburgh and West Virginia Railway, Washington County
- Tamaqua Tunnel, Tamaqua, Reading and Northern Railroad (former Reading Company)
- Temple Tunnel, Wheeling & Lake Erie Railway, Fallowfield Township, Washington County.
- Turn Hole Tunnel, Jim Thorpe, Central Railroad of New Jersey (at the Glen Onoko access, abandoned but popular with Lehigh Gorge State Park guests) Closed to all access by the Pennsylvania Department of Conservation and Natural Resources, the owners of the tunnel, in 2023 because of rocks falling from the ceiling.
- Vosburg Tunnel, Lehigh Valley Railroad, Vosburg, Wyoming County
- Wabash Tunnel, Pittsburgh and West Virginia Railway, Pittsburgh
- Wadesville Tunnel, Wadesville, Danville and Pottsville Railroad (destroyed by strip mining), second U.S. railroad tunnel
- White Cottage Tunnel, Pennsylvania Railroad, near Holbrook, Greene County
- White Haven Tunnel, White Haven, Central Railroad of New Jersey
- White Tunnel, Buffalo and Pittsburgh Railroad, Indiana
- Whitehall Tunnel originally B&O Railroad, Allegheny County, Pennsylvania
- Windsor Castle Tunnel, Allentown Railroad, Windsor Castle, Berks County, Pennsylvania (incomplete/abandoned)
- Wrays Hill Tunnel, 1,138 feet (347 m), East Broad Top Railroad, Huntingdon County
- Yatesville Tunnel, Yatesville, Lackawanna and Wyoming Valley Railroad (abandoned)

== Road tunnels ==
Name	Location	Carries	Crosses	Length	Opened	Notes
26th Street Tunnel	Philadelphia	PA 291	Intersection of Passyunk and Oregon Avenues just south of interchange with Schuylkill Expressway			
Allegheny Mountain Tunnel	Somerset County	I-70 / I-76 / Penna Turnpike	Eastern Continental Divide	6,070 feet (1,850 m)	1939, 1965	
Armstrong Tunnel	Pittsburgh	Motor Vehicles	Duquesne University	1,320 feet (400 m)	1927	
Berry Street Tunnel	Pittsburgh	West Busway		2,800 feet (850 m)	1865	oldest road tunnel in the United States, originally a rail tunnel
Blue Mountain Tunnel	Lurgan Township, northern Franklin County	I-76 / Penna Turnpike		4,339 feet (1,323 m)		
Corliss Tunnel	Pittsburgh	Corliss Street	Norfolk Southern Railroad	420 feet (130 m)	1914	
Fort Pitt Tunnel	Pittsburgh	I-376 (Penn-Lincoln Parkway)	Mount Washington	3,614 feet (1,102 m)	1960	
"Ghost Tunnel"	Curtisville	Dawson Road	Bessemer & Lake Erie Railroad			
Penn's Landing Tunnel	Philadelphia	I-95 (Delaware Expressway)			1979	
Kittatinny Mountain Tunnel	Lurgan and Fannett Townships, northern Franklin County	I-76 / Penna Turnpike		4,727 feet (1,441 m)		
Laurel Hill Tunnel	Cook and Jefferson Townships	Pennsylvania Turnpike (abandoned)		4,541 feet (1,384 m)	1940	
Lehigh Tunnel	Lehigh and Carbon counties	I-476 / Penna Turnpike NE Extension	Blue Mountain	4,400 feet (1,300 m)	1957, 1991	
Liberty Tunnel	Pittsburgh	Crosstown Boulevard	Mount Washington	5,889 feet (1,795 m)	1924	
Mount Washington Transit Tunnel	Pittsburgh	Pittsburgh Light Rail and Port Authority of Allegheny County buses	Mount Washington	3,500 feet (1,100 m)	1904	
Negro Mountain Tunnel	Somerset County	South Pennsylvania Railroad				Never used and omitted from the Pennsylvania Turnpike
Rays Hill Tunnel		Pennsylvania Turnpike (abandoned)	Rays Hill	3,532 feet (1,077 m)	1940	
Sideling Hill Tunnel		Pennsylvania Turnpike (abandoned)	Sideling Hill	6,782 feet (2,067 m)	1940	
Squirrel Hill Tunnel	Pittsburgh	I-376 (Penn-Lincoln Parkway)	Squirrel Hill	4,225 feet (1,288 m)	1953	
Spring Garden Street Tunnel	Philadelphia	Spring Garden Street	Philadelphia Museum of Art			
Tuscarora Mountain Tunnel	Franklin and Huntingdon counties	I-76 / Penna Turnpike	Tuscarora Mountain	5,326 feet (1,623 m)		
Twin Tunnels	Downingtown	Valley Creek Road				
University City Tunnel	Philadelphia	I-76 (Schuylkill Expressway)	30th Street Station and several blocks of streets with the University of Pennsylvania on the west and openings toward the Schuylkill River on the east			
Wabash Tunnel	Pittsburgh	Motor Vehicles	Mount Washington	3,342 feet (1,019 m)	2004	originally open from 1903 to 1946 as a rail tunnel, now serves HOV traffic

== Other transportation tunnels ==
- Auburn Tunnel on the Schuylkill Canal, 450 feet (140 m), Auburn, daylighted in 1857
- Union Canal Tunnel, 0.6 miles (0.97 km), Lebanon

== See also ==
- List of tunnels documented by the Historic American Engineering Record in Pennsylvania
- List of tunnels in the United States
