= Crafton station =

Crafton
- A G2 Bus pulls into Crafton station

General information
- Location: West Busway at Crennell Avenue; Crafton, Pennsylvania
- Coordinates: 40°25′34″N 80°04′22″W
- Owner: Pittsburgh Regional Transit (PRT)
- Platforms: 2 side platforms
- Connections: PRT: 29

Construction
- Structure type: Elevated
- Parking: 106 spaces
- Accessible: Yes

History
- Opened: September 2000

Passengers
- 2019: 419 (weekday boardings)

Services
Preceding station	Pittsburgh Regional Transit	Following station
Idlewood toward Carnegie	West Busway	Ingram toward Sheraden
Location

Crafton station is an elevated busway station operated by Pittsburgh Regional Transit in Crafton, Pennsylvania. The station is located on the West Busway and is served by routes 28X, G2, G3 and G31.

The station has a 106-space park and ride lot.
