= Ingram station =

Ingram

General information
- Location: West Busway at East Prospect Avenue; Ingram, Pennsylvania
- Coordinates: 40°25′34″N 80°04′22″W
- Owner: Pittsburgh Regional Transit (PRT)
- Platforms: 2 side platforms
- Connections: PRT: 26, 27

Construction
- Structure type: Below-grade
- Accessible: Yes

History
- Opened: September 2000

Passengers
- 2019: 281 (weekday boardings)

Services
Preceding station	Pittsburgh Regional Transit	Following station
Crafton toward Carnegie	West Busway	Sheraden Terminus
Location

Ingram station is a below grade busway station operated by Pittsburgh Regional Transit in Ingram, Pennsylvania. The station is on the West Busway and is served by routes 28X, G2, G3 and G31. The station is slightly below grade as the Berry Street Tunnel is just north of the station.
