= Idlewood station =

Idlewood
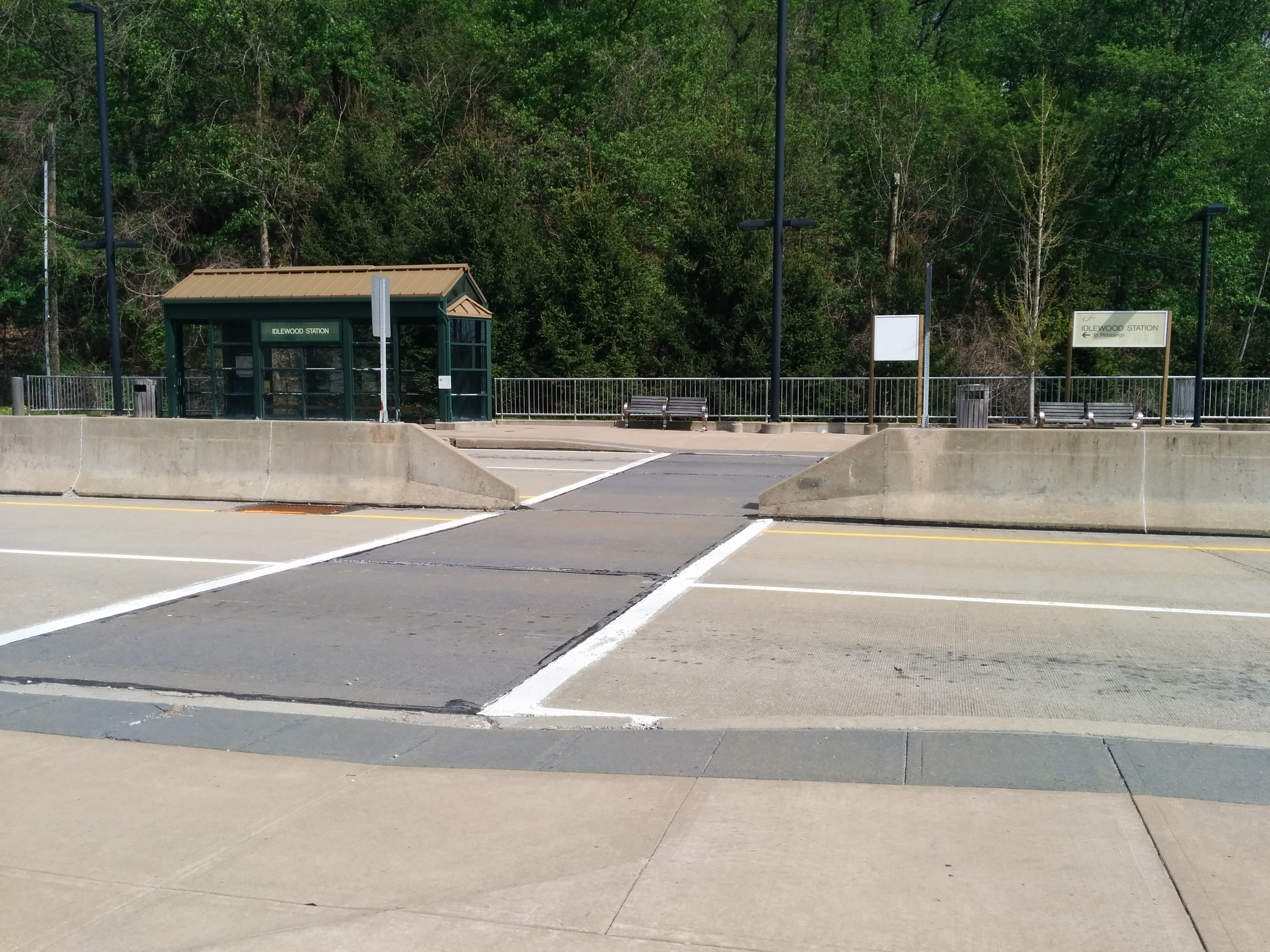
- Inbound shelter at Idlewood station

General information
- Location: West Busway at Morange Road; Pittsburgh, Pennsylvania
- Coordinates: 40°25′34″N 80°04′22″W\
- Owner: Pittsburgh Regional Transit (PRT)
- Platforms: 2 side platforms

Construction
- Structure type: Elevated
- Parking: 33 spaces
- Accessible: Yes

History
- Opened: September 2000

Passengers
- 2019: 123 (weekday boardings)

Services
Preceding station	Pittsburgh Regional Transit	Following station
Bell toward Carnegie	West Busway	Crafton toward Sheraden
Location

Idlewood station is an elevated busway station operated by Pittsburgh Regional Transit near the East Carnegie and Oakwood neighborhoods of Pittsburgh, Pennsylvania. The station is located on the West Busway and is served by routes 28X, G2, G3 and G31. The station is named for the nearby Idlewood Road.

The station has a 33-space park and ride lot.
