= Idlewood =

Idlewood may refer to:

- The former name of Evanston, Cincinnati, a neighborhood in Ohio
- Idlewood, a district of Kitchener, Ontario
- The former name of the City of University Heights, Ohio
- Idlewood station, an elevated busway station in Pittsburgh, Pennsylvania
