= List of Delta Chi chapters =

Delta Chi (ΔΧ) is a North American collegiate social fraternity. It was formed in 1890 at Cornell University as a professional fraternity for law students, becoming a social fraternity in 1922.

== Collegiate chapters ==
In the following list, active chapters are indicated in bold and inactive chapters and institutions are in italics.

Chapter	Charter date and range	Institution	Location	Status	Ref.
**Cornell**	October 13, 1890 – 2003; 2007	Cornell University	Ithaca, New York	Active	
New York	1891–1949	New York University	New York City, New York	Inactive	
Albany	1892–1894	Albany Law School	Albany, New York	Inactive	
**Minnesota**	1892	University of Minnesota	Minneapolis, Minnesota	Active	
DePauw	1892–1894, 1928–2011	DePauw University	Greencastle, Indiana	Inactive	(Note: In 1928, the chapter reformed from Kappa Phi Sigma, established in 1922.)
Michigan	1892–1934, 1948-2026	University of Michigan	Ann Arbor, Michigan	Inactive (suspended)	
Northwestern	1893–1894, 1897–1910, 1999–2020	Northwestern University	Evanston, IL	Inactive	
Dickinson	1893–1933	Dickinson College	Carlisle, PA	Inactive	
Kent	1896–1934	Chicago-Kent College of Law	Chicago, IL	Inactive	
Buffalo	1897–1935, 1979–1991	University at Buffalo	Buffalo, NY	Inactive	
Osgoode Hall	1897–1975	University of Toronto	Toronto, ON	Inactive	
**Syracuse**	1899–1917, 1967–1970, 2004	Syracuse University	Syracuse, NY	Active	(Note: Chapter formed from the Syracuse Law Club, established in 1898.)
Union	1901–1994	Union College	Schenectady, NY	Inactive	(Note: Chapter absorbed Alpha Gamma Phi.)
West Virginia	1902–1908, 2021–2022	West Virginia University	Morgantown, WV	Inactive	(Note: Chapter was suspended and can be reinstated in 2025.)
**Ohio State**	1902–1983, 1989–2004, 2011-present	Ohio State University	Columbus, OH	Active	(Note: Chapter formed from Delta Zeta Chi, established in 1902.)
New York	1902–1905	New York Law School	New York, NY	Inactive	
Chicago	1903–1929	University of Chicago	Chicago, IL	Inactive	(Note: Chapter formed from Inner Temple, established in 1902.)
Georgetown	1903–1949	Georgetown University	Washington, D.C.	Inactive	
Pennsylvania	1904–1917, 1929–1949	University of Pennsylvania	Philadelphia, PA	Inactive	(Note: Chapter was reestablished from Delta Phi Sigma, established in 1923.)
Virginia	1905–1936	University of Virginia	Charlottesville, VA	Inactive	
Stanford	1905–1970	Stanford University	Palo Alto, CA	Inactive	(Note: Chapter formed from Stephen Field Club, established in 1905.)
Texas	1907–1970, 1989–2019	University of Texas	Austin, TX	Inactive	(Note: Chapter formed from the Texas Law Club. After going dormant, it reformed as a Provisional Chapter in 1986.)
**Washington**	1908–2018, 2023–present	University of Washington	Seattle, WA	Colony	(Note: Chapter reformed as a colony in 2022.)
Nebraska	1909–1934, 1947–1953	University of Nebraska	Lincoln, NE	Inactive	(Note: Chapter formed from the John Marshall Law Club.)
Southern California	1910–2016	University of Southern California	Los Angeles	Inactive	(Note: Chapter formed from the Lew Chambers Law Club.)
Abracadabra	1910–1969, 1978–1993, 2003–2019	University of California, Berkeley	Berkeley, CA	Inactive	(Note: Chapter formed from the Field Law Club. It later absorbed Abracadabra. After going dormant, it reformed as a Provisional Chapter in 1975 and 2001.)
**Iowa**	1912–2019	University of Iowa	Iowa City, IA	Colony	(Note: Chapter formed from the Mace Club, established in 1912. After going dormant, it reformed as a colony in 2025.)
Kentucky	1913–1954, 1975–2007	University of Kentucky	Lexington, KY	Inactive	
**Wisconsin**	1921–1949, 1992–1995, 2016	University of Wisconsin-Madison	Madison, WI	Active	(Note: Chapter formed from Middle Temple, established in 1920.)
Columbia	1923–1950	Columbia University	New York, NY	Inactive	(Note: Chapter formed from Beta Nu, established in 1920.)
**Kansas**	1923	University of Kansas	Lawrence, KS	Active	(Note: Chapter formed from Sigma Phi Sigma, established in 1912.)
**Iowa**	1923–2001, 2014	Iowa State University	Ames, IA	Active	(Note: Chapter formed from Hau Ki, established in 1917. It absorbed Sigma Sigma in 1933. After going dormant, it reformed as a Provisional Chapter in 2012.)
**Illinois**	1923	University of Illinois	Champaign, IL	Active	(Note: Chapter formed from Beta Delta Sigma, established in 1913.)
Idaho	1924–2012	University of Idaho	Moscow, ID	Inactive	(Note: Chapter formed from Kappa Delta, established in 1922.)
**Arizona**	1925–20xx ?; 2024	University of Arizona	Tucson, AZ	Active	(Note: Chapter formed from Delta Nu, established in 1923.) (Note: Provisional Chapter formed in 2022)
**Indiana**	1925–2002, 2009–2019, 2023-present	Indiana University Bloomington	Bloomington, IN	Colony	(Note: Chapter formed from Beta Xi, established in 1924. After going dormant in 2019, it reformed as a colony in 2025.) (Note: Chapter was suspended.)
**Florida**	1926–1941, 1946–2001, 2008	University of Florida	Gainesville, FL	Active	(Note: Chapter formed from Chi Delta, established in 1922. After going dormant, it reformed as a Provisional Chapter in 1946 and 2006.)
**Alabama**	1927	University of Alabama	Tuscaloosa, AL	Active	(Note: Chapter forme from Theta Sigma, established in 1925.)
**Purdue**	1927–2020, 2024-present	Purdue University	West Lafayette, IN	Active	(Note: Chapter formed from Sigma Delta Epsilon, established in 1925. After going dormant, it reformed as a colony in 2024.)
Oklahoma	1927–1961, 1985–1991, 2012–2015	University of Oklahoma	Norman, OK	Inactive	(Note: Chapter formed from Kappa Theta, established in 1923. After going dormant, it reformed as a Provisional Chapter in 1983 and 2003.)
S.M.U.	1927–1985	Southern Methodist University	Dallas, TX	Inactive	(Note: Chapter formed from Chi Delta Alpha, established in 1923.)
**Penn State**	1929	Pennsylvania State University	State College, PA	Active	(Note: Chapter formed from Delta Pi, established in 1919.)
**Oregon State**	1931–2000, 2006	Oregon State University	Corvallis, OR	Active	(Note: Chapter formed from Theta Delta Nu, established in 1917.)
**Miami**	1932	Miami University	Oxford, OH	Active	(Note: Chapter formed from Delta Theta Chi, established in 1919.)
U.C.L.A.	1934–1959	University of California, Los Angeles	Los Angeles, CA	Inactive	(Note: Chapter formed from Alpha Delta Chi, established in 1930.)
Michigan State	1935–2018	Michigan State University	East Lansing, MI	Inactive	(Note: Chapter formed from Aetheon, established in 1915.)
**L.S.U.**	1941–1956, 1984–2002, 2006	Louisiana State University	Baton Rouge, LA	Active	
Rollins	1941–1970	Rollins College	Winter Park, FL	Inactive	(Note: Chapter formed from Sigma Phi Sigma, established in 1937.)
Washington State	1943–1972, 1988–2020	Washington State University	Pullman, WA	Inactive	(Note: Chapter formed from Delta Sigma Sigma, established in 1928.)
**Hobart**	1948	Hobart College	Geneva, NY	Active	
Oklahoma State	1948–2009	Oklahoma State University	Stillwater, OK	Inactive	
Arizona State	1949–1971, 1988–199x ?, 2003–2018	Arizona State University	Tempe, AZ	Inactive	(Note: Chapter formed from Tau Sigma Phi, established in 1933.)
**Lake Forest**	1950–1966, 1997	Lake Forest College	Lake Forest, IL	Active	(Note: Chapter formed from Alpha Sigma Kappa, established in 1926.)
**Missouri**	1951–1966, 1979–1985, 1988	University of Missouri	Columbia, MO	Active	(Note: Chapter formed from Chi Delta, established in 1950. After going dormant, it reformed as a Provisional Chapter in 1975 and 1987.)
**Auburn**	1951–1985, 1988	Auburn University	Auburn, AL	Active	
Miami	1950–1953	University of Miami	Miami, FL	Inactive	
**Lehigh**	1952–1998, 2011	Lehigh University	Bethlehem, PA	Active	(Note: Chapter formed from Rho Eta, established in 1949. After going dormant, it reformed as a Provisional Chapter in 2009.)
West. Michigan	1955–1971, 1984–2015	Western Michigan University	Kalamazoo, MI	Inactive	(Note: Chapter formed from Sigma Alpha Delta, established in 1950. Later, it reformed from Delta Alpha Gamma.)
Connecticut	1955–2011	University of Connecticut	Storrs, CT	Inactive	(Note: Chapter formed from Delta Sigma, established in 1952.)
Southern Illinois	1955–1972, 1976–1998, 2005–2020	Southern Illinois University	Carbondale, IL	Inactive	(Note: Chapter formed from Delta Epsilon Chi, established in 1954.)
Houston	1956–1977	University of Houston	Houston, TX	Inactive	(Note: Chapter formed from Lambda Alpha Chi, established in 1955.)
Missouri K.C.	1956–2002	University of Missouri-Kansas City	Kansas City, MO	Inactive	(Note: Chapter formed from the Bounders, established in 1938.)
Wayne	1956–1974	Wayne State University	Detroit, MI	Inactive	(Note: Chapter formed from Chega, established in 1922.)
**Ball State**	1958–2003, 2024	Ball State University	Muncie, IN	Active	(Note: Chapter formed from Cardinal, established in 1955.)
Northern Arizona	1959–1976, 1986–2024	Northern Arizona University	Flagstaff, AZ	Inactive	(Note: Chapter formed from Kappa Kappa, established in 1958. Charter revoked in 2024 by national organization.)
T.E.P.	1961–1966	University of Texas El Paso	El Paso, TX	Inactive	
**Florida State**	1961–1967, 1979–1998, 2012	Florida State University	Tallahassee, FL	Active	
Oregon	1963–1971	University of Oregon	Eugene, OR	Inactive	
**Mississippi State**	1964	Mississippi State University	Starkville, MS	Active	
**Kansas State**	1964–1981, 1994–2008, 2013	Kansas State University	Manhattan, KS	Active	(Note: Chapter formed form D.D.C., established in 1958.)
Parsons	1965–1972	Parsons College	Fairfield, Iowa	Inactive	(Note: Chapter formed from Sigma Alpha Upsilon, established in 1962. It closed when the college closed.)
Georgia	1965–1983, 1999–2009	University of Georgia	Athens, GA	Inactive	
Troy	1966–2021	Troy State University	Troy, AL	Inactive	
**Livingston**	1967–2006, 2011	University of West Alabama	Livingston, AL	Active	
Fullerton	1967–19xx ?; 2002–2021	California State University, Fullerton	Fullerton, CA	Inactive	(Note: Chapter formed from Phi Kappa Chi, established in 1964.)
**Eastern Illinois**	1967–2004, 2013	Eastern Illinois University	Charleston, IL	Active	
**Long Beach**	1968	California State University, Long Beach	Long Beach, CA	Active	(Note: Chapter formed from Theta Beta Pi, established in the 1960s.)
**Jacksonville**	1968	Jacksonville State University	Jacksonville, AL	Active	
**Valdosta**	1968	Valdosta State University	Valdosta, GA	Active	
**Massachusetts**	1969–2001, 2013	University of Massachusetts Amherst	Amherst, MA	Active	
Gorham	1969–2011	University of Southern Maine	Gorham, ME	Inactive	
**San Diego**	1969–1996, 2021	San Diego State University	San Diego, CA	Active	
**Oshkosh**	1969–1980, 1986–2011 ,2016–2023	University of Wisconsin–Oshkosh	Oshkosh, WI	Inactive	
**Tri-State**	1969	Trine University	Angola, IN	Active	(Note: Chapter formed from Beta Phi Theta, established in 1929.)
**Denison**	1969–199x ?, 2003	Denison University	Granville, OH	Active	(Note: Chapter formed from American Association Comm. Cl., established in 191.)
**Whitewater**	1970–1981, 1987–2004, 2010	University of Wisconsin–Whitewater	Whitewater, WI	Active	
Youngstown	1970–1976	Youngstown State University	Youngstown, OH	Inactive	(Note: Chapter formed from Phi Theta, established in 1968.)
Northern Iowa	1970–2003	University of Northern Iowa	Cedar Falls, IA	Inactive	(Note: Chapter formed from Phi Chi Omega, established in 1967.)
Idaho State	1970–1981	Idaho State University	Pocatello, ID	Inactive	
Milwaukee	1970–1973	University of Wisconsin–Milwaukee	Milwaukee, WI	Inactive	
**Creighton**	1970–1981, 1987–2020, 2023	Creighton University	Omaha, NE	Active	(Note: Chapter formed from Delta Chi Delta, established in 1967.)
**Cal. Poly**	1970–1973, 1989	California Polytechnic State University	San Luis Obispo, CA	Active	(Note: Chapter formed from Delta Tau, established in 1955.)
Sacramento	1971–1973, 1983–2002, 201x ?–2019	California State University, Sacramento	Sacramento, CA	Inactive	(Note: Chapter formed from Beta Phi, established in 1968.)
Windsor	1971–2020	University of Windsor	Windsor, ON	Inactive	
Northeastern	1971–1983	Northeastern University	Boston, MA	Inactive	(Note: Chapter formed from Phi Alpha Rho, established in 1960.)
**Gannon**	1971	Gannon University	Erie, PA	Active	(Note: Chapter formed from Beta Phi, established in 1968.)
**Central Missouri**	1971	University of Central Missouri	Warrensburg, MO	Active	
NW Missouri	1971–2014	Northwest Missouri State University	Maryville, MO	Inactive	
**Embry Riddle**	1972	Embry-Riddle Aeronautical University, Daytona Beach	Daytona Beach, FL	Active	(Note: Chapter formed from Pi Sigma Phi, established in 1967.)
West Liberty	1972–1994	West Liberty State College	West Liberty, WV	Inactive	
Montevello	1972–2012	University of Montevallo	Montevallo, AL	Inactive	(Note: Chapter formed from Delta Kappa, established in 1961.)
**Johnstown**	1972	University of Pittsburgh at Johnstown	Johnstown, PA	Active	(Note: Chapter formed from Phi Delta Psi, established in 1962.)
**Georgia Southern**	1972–1973, 1979–1987, 2005	Georgia Southern University	Statesboro, GA	Active	
**Illinois State**	1973–1986, 1990–2000, 2005–2017, 2024	Illinois State University	Normal, IL	Active	
East Texas	1973–1981	East Texas A&M University	Commerce, TX	Inactive	(Note: Texas A&M University at Commerce changed its name to East Texas A&M University on 7 November 2024.)
**Edwardsville**	1974–1979, 2019	Southern Illinois University Edwardsville	Edwardsville, IL	Active	
California Pennsylvania	1974–2018	California University of Pennsylvania	California, PA	Inactive	(Note: Chapter formed from Red & Buff, established in 1973.)
Missouri West	1976–1979	Missouri Western State University	Saint Joseph, MO	Inactive	
**SE Missouri**	1977	Southeast Missouri State University	Cape Girardeau, MO	Active	
**Marquette**	1977	Marquette University	Milwaukee, WI	Active	(Note: Chapter formed from Pi Sigma Epsilon, established in 1962.)
**Huntsville**	1977	University of Alabama in Huntsville	Huntsville, AL	Active	
**NE Missouri**	1978	Truman State University	Kirksville, MO	Active	
Jacksonville	1979–1986	Jacksonville University	Jacksonville, FL	Inactive	
Columbus	1980–1986	Columbus College	Columbus, GA	Inactive	
New Haven	1981–2016	University of New Haven	West Haven, CT	Inactive	
Louisville	1982–1994	University of Louisville	Louisville, KY	Inactive	
**Texas Tech**	1983–1992, 2006	Texas Tech University	Lubbock, TX	Active	
**Colorado**	1983–1996, 200x ?–2010	University of Colorado Boulder	Boulder, CO	Colony	(Note: Chapter reformed as a colony in 2021.)
**Augusta**	1983	Augusta University	Augusta, GA	Active	
**Augusta**	1983	West Virginia University Institute of Technology	Montgomery, WV	Active	
**Northern Colorado**	1984	University of Northern Colorado	Greeley, CO	Active	
Eastern Washington	1984–2000, 2012–2016	Eastern Washington University	Cheney, WA	Inactive	
**Appalachian State**	1986	Appalachian State University	Boone, NC	Active	
Clarion	1986–1994	Clarion University of Pennsylvania	Clarion, PA	Inactive	
New Hampshire	1986–1992	University of New Hampshire	Durham, NH	Inactive	
**S.W. Missouri**	1986	Missouri State University	Springfield, MO	Active	
Chico	1987–2010, 2020–2023	California State University, Chico	Chico, CA	Inactive	
**Louisiana Tech**	1987	Louisiana Tech University	Ruston, LA	Active	
Texas A&M	1988–2012	Texas A&M University	College Station, TX	Inactive	
Central Michigan	1988–2013	Central Michigan University	Mount Pleasant, MI	Inactive	
**Tarleton**	1988	Tarleton State University	Stephenville, TX	Active	
**Northern Illinois**	1989–2005, 2011	Northern Illinois University	Dekalb, IL	Active	
Behrend	1990–2021	Penn State Erie, The Behrend College	Erie, PA	Inactive	(Note: Chapter formed from Beta Upsilon Nu, established in 1987.)
**Clemson**	1990	Clemson University	Clemson, SC	Active	
**Kent**	1990–2010, 2019	Kent State University	Kent, OH	Active	
N.C. State	1990–2002	North Carolina State University	Raleigh, NC	Inactive	
Maryland	1990–2015	University of Maryland	College Park, MD	Inactive	
**Montclair**	1990	Montclair State University	Upper Montclair, NJ	Active	
**Bryant**	1990	Bryant University	Smithfield, RI	Active	
**Georgia Tech**	1991	Georgia Institute of Technology	Atlanta, GA	Active	
Western Ontario	1991–2001	University of Western Ontario	London, ON	Inactive	
Frostberg	1991–2011	Frostburg State University	Frostburg, MD	Inactive	
Elmhurst	1991–2000	Elmhurst College	Elmhurst, IL	Inactive	
Virginia Commonwealth	1991 – May 28, 2021	Virginia Commonwealth University	Richmond, VA	Inactive	
**Fredonia**	1991	State University of New York at Fredonia	Fredonia, NY	Active	
Edinboro	1991–1995	Edinboro University of Pennsylvania	Edinboro, PA	Inactive	
Reno	1992–2008	University of Nevada, Reno	Reno, NV	Inactive	
**Virginia Tech**	1992–2008, 2020	Virginia Tech	Blacksburg, VA	Active	
**Mankato**	1992	Minnesota State University, Mankato	Mankato, MN	Active	(Note: Chapter formed from Alpha Omega, established in 1989.)
Northern Michigan	1992–2000	Northern Michigan University	Marquette, MI	Inactive	
East Carolina	1992–2018	East Carolina University	Greenville, NC	Inactive	
Florida International	1992–1998	Florida International University	Miami, FL	Inactive	
American	1992–2022	American University	Washington, DC	Inactive	
Davis	1993–2001, 2008–2017	University of California, Davis	Davis, CA	Inactive	
Western Illinois	1993–2005	Western Illinois University	Macomb, IL	Inactive	
**Hayward**	1993	California State University, East Bay	Hayward, CA	Active	
**Duquesne**	1994	Duquesne University	Pittsburgh, PA	Active	
S.W. Texas	1994–2010	Texas State University–San Marcos	San Marcos, TX	Inactive	
Old Dominion	1994–2002	Old Dominion University	Norfolk, VA	Inactive	
Wyoming	1994–2003	University of Wyoming	Laramie, WY	Inactive	
Western Carolina	1994–2006	Western Carolina University	Cullowhee, NC	Inactive	
**Rowan**	1995–2010, 2022	Rowan University	Glassboro, NJ	Active; Sub rosa	(Note: This chapter is presently unrecognized by its university.)
Memphis	1995–1998	University of Memphis	Memphis, TN	Inactive	(Note: Chapter formed from Sigma Beta Tau, established in 1983.)
**West Chester**	1996–2005, 2010	West Chester University	West Chester, PA	Active	
**Radford**	1997	Radford University	Radford, VA	Active	(Note: Chapter formed from Gamma Psi, established in 1994.)
**Alberta**	April 5, 1997	University of Alberta	Edmonton, AB	Active	
New Mexico State	1998–2008	New Mexico State University	Las Cruces, NM	Inactive	
**Kettering**	1998	Kettering University	Flint, MI	Active	
**Las Vegas**	1998–2011, 2019	University of Nevada, Las Vegas	Las Vegas, NV	Active	
Ferris	1999–2011	Ferris State University	Big Rapids, MI	Inactive	(Note: Chapter formed from Gamma Iota Gamma, established in 1992.)
**Rutgers**	1999	Rutgers University	New Brunswick, NJ	Active	
South Florida	2000–2018	University of South Florida	Tampa, FL	Inactive	
James Madison	2001–2013	James Madison University	Harrisonburg, VA	Inactive	
Bowling Green	2002–2022	Bowling Green State University	Bowling Green, OH	Inactive	
Stephen Austin	2002–2015	Stephen F. Austin State University	Nacogdoches, TX	Inactive	
**Colorado State**	2002–2012; 2022	Colorado State University	Fort Collins, CO	Active	(Note: Reformed as a Provisional Chapter in 2016 and chartered in 2022.)
**South Dakota State**	2004	South Dakota State University	Brookings, SD	Active	
Pittsburgh	2003–20xx ?	University of Pittsburgh	Pittsburgh, PA	Inactive	
**William & Mary**	2005	College of William & Mary	Williamsburg, VA	Active	
West Georgia	2005–2014	University of West Georgia	Carrollton, GA	Inactive	
**Rhode Island**	2005	University of Rhode Island	Kingston, RI	Active	
**Coastal Carolina**	2005–2013; 2023	Coastal Carolina University	Conway, SC	Active	
Binghamton	2006–2013	Binghamton University	Binghamton, NY	Inactive	
Cortland	2007–2017	State University of New York at Cortland	Cortland, NY	Inactive	
Hofstra	2008–2022	Hofstra University	Hempstead, NY	Inactive	
Washburn	2008–2014	Washburn University	Topeka, KS	Inactive	
**George Mason**	2008	George Mason University	Fairfax, VA	Active	
Marshall	2009–2015	Marshall University	Huntington, WV	Inactive	
**North Alabama**	2010	University of North Alabama	Florence, AL	Active	
**East Stroudsburg**	2010	East Stroudsburg University of Pennsylvania	East Stroudsburg, PA	Active	
Corpus Christi	2010–2017	Texas A&M University-Corpus Christi	Corpus Christi, TX	Inactive	
**Kennesaw**	2010	Kennesaw State University	Kennesaw, GA	Active	
Albany	2010–2011	University at Albany, SUNY	Albany, New York	Inactive	
**Wilmington**	2011	University of North Carolina Wilmington	Wilmington, NC	Active	
**U.S.P.**	2011	University of the Sciences	Philadelphia, PA	Active	
**Hamilton**	2011	Hamilton College	Clinton, NY	Active	
**Livingston**	2011	University of West Alabama	Livingston, AL	Active	
**Case Western**	2012	Case Western Reserve University	Cleveland, OH	Active	
**Riverside**	2012	University of California Riverside	Riverside, CA	Active	
**Spring Hill**	2013	Spring Hill College	Mobile, AL	Active	
Charlotte	2013–2017	University of North Carolina at Charlotte	Charlotte, NC	Inactive	
**Aldelphi**	2013	Adelphi University	Garden City, NY	Active	
**North Georgia**	2015	University of North Georgia	Dahlonega, GA	Active	
**Ferrum**	2015	Ferrum College	Ferrum, VA	Active	
Beaufort	2016–2020	University of South Carolina Beaufort	Beaufort, SC	Inactive	
**Little Rock**	2016	University of Arkansas - Little Rock	Little Rock, AR	Active	
**Edwardsville**	2017	Southern Illinois University in Edwardsville	Edwardsville, IL	Active	
**Kingsville**	2018	Texas A&M University - Kingsville	Kingsville, TX	Active	
**Chico**	February 28, 2018	California State University, Chico	Chico, CA	Active	
**Delaware**	2019	University of Delaware	Newark, DE	Active	
**San Antonio**	2020	Texas A&M University-San Antonio	San Antonio, TX	Active	
**Denver**	2020	University of Denver	Denver, CO	Active	
**Chapel Hill**	2021	University of North Carolina at Chapel Hill	Chapel Hill, NC	Active	
**Omaha**	2022	University of Nebraska Omaha	Omaha, NE	Active	
**Temple**	2022	Temple University	Philadelphia, PA	Active	
**Southern Arkansas**	2022	Southern Arkansas University	Magnolia, AR	Active	
**High Point**	2020	High Point University	High Point, NC	Active	(Note: Provisional Chapter formed in 2020.)
**Villanova**	2022	Villanova University	Villanova, PA	Active	
**Tennessee**	2023	University of Tennessee, Knoxville	Knoxville, TN	Active	
**Quinnipiac**		Quinnipiac University	Hamden, CT	Colony	(Note: Provisional Chapter formed in 2021.)
**South Carolina**		University of South Carolina	Columbia, SC	Active	(Note: Provisional chapter (colony) established in 2024.)
**Utah**		University of Utah	Salt Lake City, UT	Colony	

== Alumni chapters ==
The following is a list is in alphabetical order, with active chapters in bold and inactive chapters are in italics.

Chapter	Charter date and range	Location	Status	Ref.
**Alberta**		Alberta, Canada	Active	
**Arizona Valley**		Arizona	Active	
**Arkansas**		Arkansas	Active	
**Atlanta Area**	2017	Atlanta, Georgia	Active	
Augusta Area		Augusta, Georgia	Inactive	
Austin		Augstin, Texas	Inactive	
**Baton Rouge**		Baton Rouge, Louisiana	Active	
**Boston Area**		Boston, Massachusetts	Active	
**Cape Fear Area**		Wilmington, North Carolina	Active	
**Capital Area**		Washington, D.C., Maryland, Delaware, and Virginia	Active	
Central Florida		Orlanda, Florida	Inactive	
**Charlotte**		Charlotte, North Carolina	Active	
**Chicago Area**	2019	Chicago, Illinois	Active	
**Colorado Front Range**		Boulder, Denver, Colorado Springs, and Pueblo, Colorado	Active	
**Columbus**		Columbus, Ohio	Active	
**Connecticut Area**		Connecticut	Active	
**Dallas/Fort Worth**		Dallas/Fort Worth, Texas	Active	
Edmonton, Alberta		Edmonton, Alberta, Canada	Inactive	
**Greater Wisconsin Area**		Wisconsin	Active	
Gurnet Point, MA		Gurnet Point, Massachusetts	Inactive	
**Houston Area**		Houston, Texas	Active	
Illinois		Illinois	Inactive	
**Kansas City Area**		Kansas City, Missouri and Kansas City, Kansas	Active	
**Las Vegas Alumni**		Las Vegas, Nevada	Active	
**Los Angeles**		Los Angeles, California	Active	
Miami Area		Miami, Florida	Inactive	
**Monongahela Valley/Golden Triangle**		Mineral Point, Pennsylvania	Active	
Myrtle Beach		Myrtle Beach, South Carolina	Inactive	
**Nashville**		Nashville, Tennessee	Active	
New Orleans		New Orleans, Louisiana	Inactive	
New York City		New York City, New York	Inactive	
**Northeast Ohio Area**	c. 2000–20xx ?; October 25, 2016	Northeast Ohio	Active	
Oakland, NJ		Oakland, New Jersey	Inactive	
**Omaha**		Omaha, Nebraska	Active	
**Orange County**		Orange County, California	Active	
**Philadelphia Area**		Philadelphia, Pennsylvania	Active	
**Rio Grande Area**		South Texas	Active	
**Sacramento Area**		Sacramento, California	Active	
**St. Louis**		St. Louis, Missouri	Active	
**San Antonio**		San Antonio, Texas	Active	
**San Diego**		San Diego, California	Active	
**Seattle**	20xx ?	Seattle, Washington	Active	
**Tampa Bay Area**		Tampa Bay area, Florida	Active	
**Tennessee Valley**		Knoxville and Chattanooga, Tennessee	Active	
**Three Rivers**		Greater Pittsburgh, Pennsylvania	Active	
**Troy Area**		Troy, New York	Active	
**Twin Cities Area**		Minneapolis-Saint Paul, Minnesota	Active	
**West Virginia**		West Virginia	Active	
**Windsor/Detroit**		Detroit–Windsor, Michigan	Active	
