= Mineral Point =

Mineral Point is the name of places in the United States.

- Mineral Point, Missouri, a village
- Mineral Point, Pennsylvania, an unincorporated community
- Mineral Point, Wisconsin, a city
- Mineral Point (town), Wisconsin, a town
- Mineral Point, Green County, Wisconsin, an unincorporated community
