= Bell station (Pittsburgh Regional Transit) =

Bell

General information
- Location: West Busway at Rosslyn Avenue; Carnegie, Pennsylvania
- Coordinates: 40°24′56″N 80°04′58″W
- Owner: Pittsburgh Regional Transit (PRT)
- Platforms: 2 side platforms

Construction
- Structure type: Elevated
- Parking: 34 spaces
- Accessible: Yes

History
- Opened: September 2000

Passengers
- 2019: 142 (weekday boardings)

Services
Preceding station	Pittsburgh Regional Transit	Following station
Carnegie Terminus	West Busway	Idlewood toward Sheraden
Location

Bell station is an elevated busway station operated by Pittsburgh Regional Transit in Carnegie, Pennsylvania. The station is located on the West Busway and is served by routes 28X G2, G3 and G31. The station is located at the busway's crossing over Rosslyn Avenue and is named for nearby Bell Avenue.

Just south of this station, routes 28X Airport Flyer and G3 Moon Flyer connect with Interstate 376 via dedicated ramps.

The station has a 34-space park and ride lot.
