= List of tunnels documented by the Historic American Engineering Record in Pennsylvania =

This is a list of tunnels documented by the Historic American Engineering Record in the U.S. state of Pennsylvania.

== Tunnels ==
Survey No.	Name (as assigned by HAER)	Built	Documented	Carries	Crosses	Location	County	Coordinates
PA-70	Pittsburgh & Steubenville Extension Railroad Tunnel	1865	1985	Pittsburgh Light Rail	Forbes Avenue and other streets	Pittsburgh	Allegheny	40°26′28″N 79°59′48″W
PA-127-F	East Broad Top Railroad and Coal Company, Sideling Hill Tunnel	1874	1986	Former East Broad Top Railroad and Coal Company	Sideling Hill	Rockhill Furnace	Huntingdon	
PA-127-J	East Broad Top Railroad and Coal Company, Wray's Hill Tunnel		1986	Former East Broad Top Railroad and Coal Company	Rays Hill	Robertsdale	Huntingdon	
PA-240	Staple Bend Tunnel	1834	1990	Former Allegheny Portage Railroad	Allegheny Mountains	Geistown	Cambria	40°21′33″N 78°51′19″W
PA-269	Pennsylvania Railroad, Bow Ridge Tunnel	1907	1987	Former Pennsylvania Railroad	Bow Ridge	Derry Township	Westmoreland	40°27′42″N 79°21′59″W
PA-357	Sand Patch Tunnel	1912	1992	CSX Transportation	Negro Mountain	Larimer Township	Somerset	39°48′17″N 78°57′55″W
PA-382	Cork Run Tunnel	1856	1995	West Busway	Berry Street	Pittsburgh and Ingram	Allegheny	40°26′56″N 80°03′44″W
PA-514	Perkasie Tunnel	1857	2000	East Penn Railroad	Landis Ridge	Perkasie	Bucks	40°22′49″N 75°17′37″W
PA-515	Allegheny Tunnel	1854	2000	Norfolk Southern Railway	Allegheny Mountains	Gallitzin	Cambria	40°28′45″N 78°32′16″W
PA-516	Gallitzin Tunnel	1904	2000	Norfolk Southern Railway	Allegheny Mountains	Gallitzin	Cambria	40°28′45″N 78°32′16″W
PA-520	Black Rock Tunnel	1837	2000	Norfolk Southern Railway	Black Rock Hill	Phoenixville	Chester	40°08′45″N 75°30′56″W
PA-539	Flat Rock Tunnel	1840	2000	Norfolk Southern Railway	Flat Rock Hill	Manayunk	Montgomery	40°02′07″N 75°14′39″W

== See also ==
- List of bridges documented by the Historic American Engineering Record in Pennsylvania
