= Staple Bend Tunnel =

Railroad tunnel in Pennsylvania, United States

- U.S. National Register of Historic Places
- U.S. National Historic Landmark
- Pennsylvania state historical marker
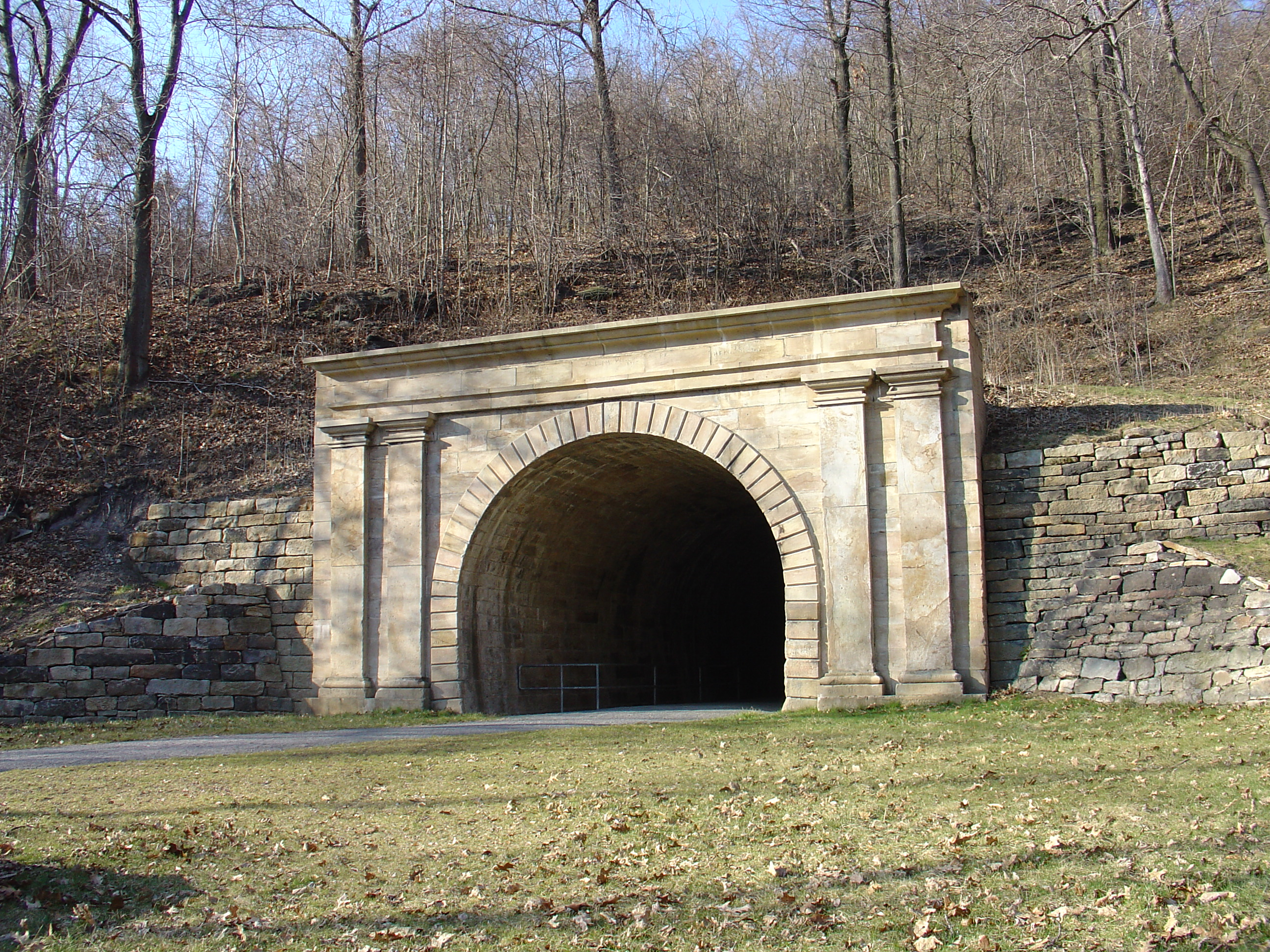
- Staple Bend Tunnel

- Location within Pennsylvania Location within the United States
- Location: Mineral Point, Conemaugh Township, Cambria County, Pennsylvania
- Coordinates: 40°21′33″N 78°51′19″W
- Built: 1833
- Architect: Sylvester Welch, J. & E. Appleton Builders
- MPS: Allegheny Portage Railroad MPS
- NRHP reference No.: 94001187

Significant dates
- Added to NRHP: April 19, 1994
- Designated NHL: April 19, 1994
- Designated PHMC: August 19, 1947

The Staple Bend Tunnel, about 4 miles (6.4 km) east of Johnstown, Pennsylvania, in a town called Mineral Point, was constructed between 1831 and 1834 for the Allegheny Portage Railroad. Construction began on April 12, 1831. This tunnel, at 901 feet (275 m) in length, was the first railway tunnel constructed in the United States. It is rock-bored and stone-lined.

Finished in June 1833, the Staple Bend Tunnel was advertised as the first railroad tunnel in the United States. It was the third tunnel of any kind built in the U.S.; the first two tunnels were for canals in Pennsylvania.

== History ==
Work began on November 21, 1831, and often occurred during inclement conditions. The men were paid $13 per month plus room and board for 12-hour days, 6 days per week. Workers chipped and blasted 901 feet (275 m) of solid rock to make the tunnel.

Approximately 14,900 cubic yards (11,400 m^{3}) of bedrock was removed using black powder blasting. This was done by drilling three-foot (0.91 m)-long holes and packing them with powder. Drilling one typical hole took up to three hours of hard effort using a three-man crew. Nine to ten holes, each one inch (25 mm) in diameter and 36 inches (910 mm) in length, were made before blasting. One pound (0.45 kg) of explosive powder wrapped in paper was pushed into each hole, tamped down, punctured with a sharp needle, and a fuse added. Fuses were lit with explosions to occur at mealtime. Workers would eat while the dust settled; then get to work cleaning (mucking) the tunnel. Of the 36-inch hole drilled only 18 inches (460 mm), or half of the hole, was blasted.

The tunnel grew about 18 inches (460 mm) each day, with both sides moving toward the center. On December 21, 1832, the workmen broke through the final barrier and connected the two ends of the tunnel. There was much celebration with speeches and toasts. The full tunnel excavation was completed in April 1833.

The ends of the Staple Bend Tunnel were lined with cut stone for safety. Rock and dirt might fall due to rain or other weather, or from the effects of the Portage Railroad going through the tunnel. The fancy entrances to the tunnel were to impress the travelers and the general public. The style was described as a "Roman Revival style with low relief lintel supported by Doric pilasters on each side." Of the total $37,498.85 spent, nearly half was to build the fancy entrance ways. After a few years of operation, the Allegheny Portage Railroad, including the tunnel, was sold to the Pennsylvania Railroad in 1857.

== After the Portage ==
In 1907, Henry Storey wrote that the east entrance facade of the tunnel had been removed for building purposes. He gave no indication of a date or the building on which the stones were used. The west entrance facade remains and has been restored to its former grandeur.

After the demise of the old Portage Railroad the tunnel had other uses. Neither the "new Portage" nor the Pennsylvania Railroad used the tunnel. It was instead a popular carriage route until the Johnstown Flood in 1889. Afterward, flood damage and other concerns made the tunnel a less desirable driving spot although local residents continued to visit, and even go courting at the tunnel until the 1940s.

In the 1940s a concrete liner was added to the east portal of the tunnel and large water lines as well as a water vault structure were built. The Manufacturer's Water Company closed the tunnel to the public and the water lines were used by Bethlehem Steel.

The tunnel was designated a National Historic Landmark in 1994, and in 2001 became part of the Allegheny Portage Railroad National Historic Site, administered by the National Park Service. Rock bolts, shoring posts, and other reinforcements were added as well as a thin mortar between the historic blocks. The tunnel is now open to the public for use as part of the Staple Bend Tunnel Trail.

== Gallery ==
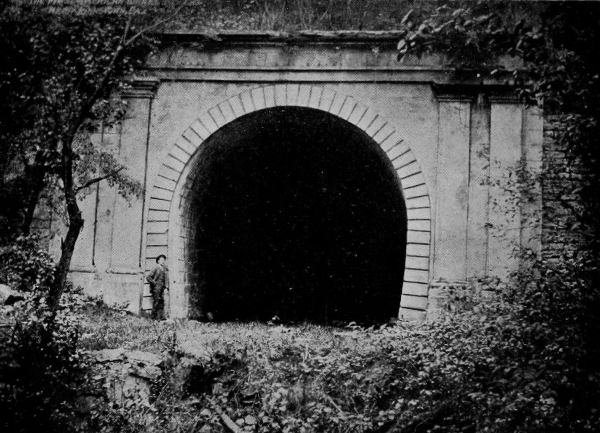
View of the abandoned tunnel, ca. 1911. A man stands to the left for a height comparison.

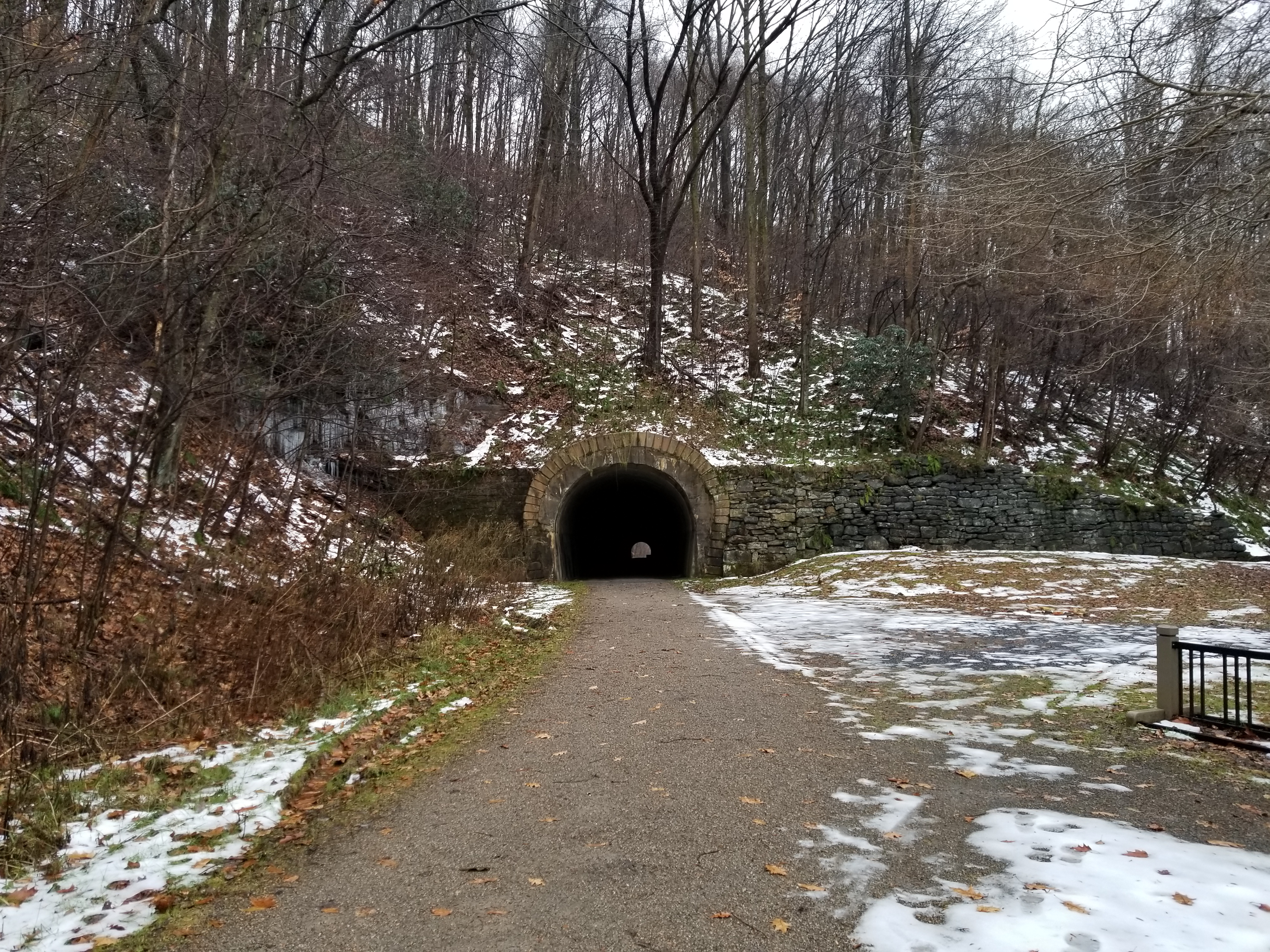
East portal

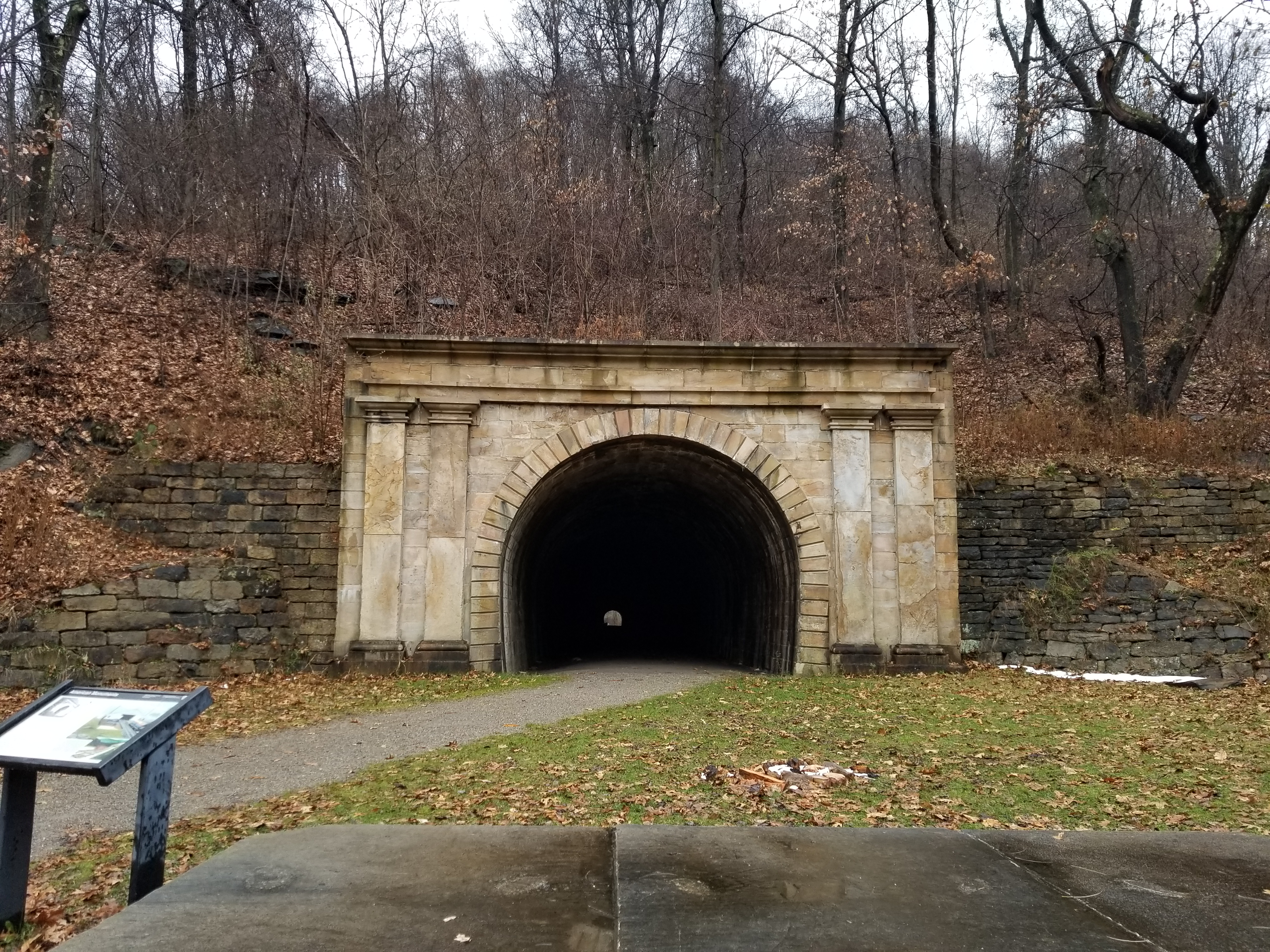
West portal

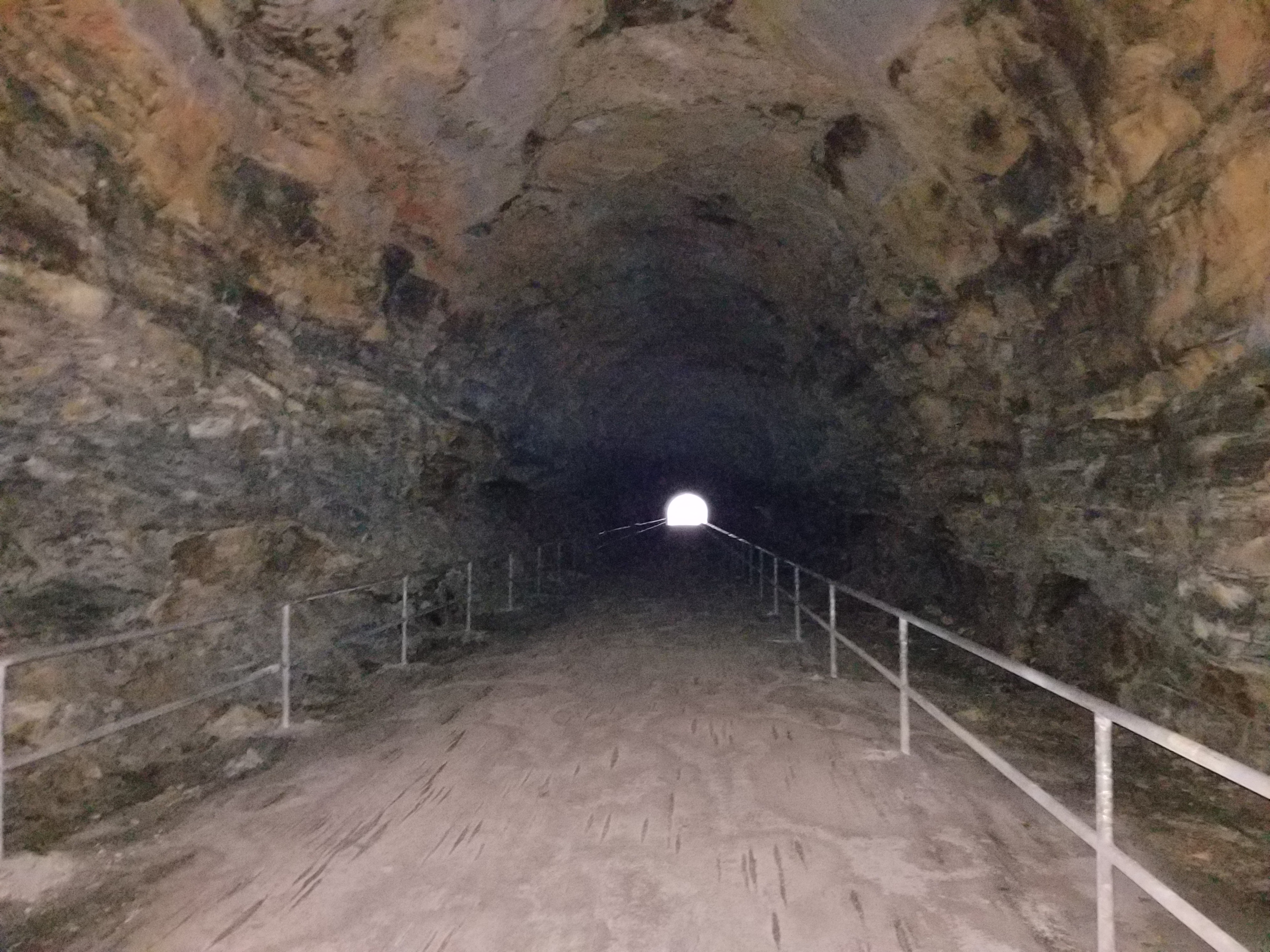
Tunnel interior

== See also ==
- List of tunnels documented by the Historic American Engineering Record in Pennsylvania
