= J&L Tunnel =

- Interactive map of J&L Tunnel

Overview
- Line: Pittsburgh Subdivision
- Location: SouthSide Works, Pittsburgh, Pennsylvania
- Coordinates: 40.42826°N 79.96467°W
- System: CSX Transportation

Operation
- Constructed: August 1, 1882 – August 19, 1883

Technical
- Length: 1,626 ft (496 m)
- No. of tracks: 1
- Track gauge: 4 ft 8 1/2 in (1,435 mm) standard gauge
- Width: 24 ft (7.3 m)

J&L Tunnel is a tunnel on CSX Transportation's Pittsburgh Subdivision, at the former location of Jones and Laughlin Steel Company (now the SouthSide Works).

The tunnel was used to allow trains on the Pittsburgh and Lake Erie Railroad to bypass the Jones and Laughlin steel mill, by passing under it.

Starting in 2011, work was performed, as part of CSX Transportation's National Gateway project, to raise the clearance inside the tunnel, allowing double-stacked container trains to pass through the tunnel.

Above the tunnel is a small park called Tunnel Park.
