= Phoenixville Tunnel =

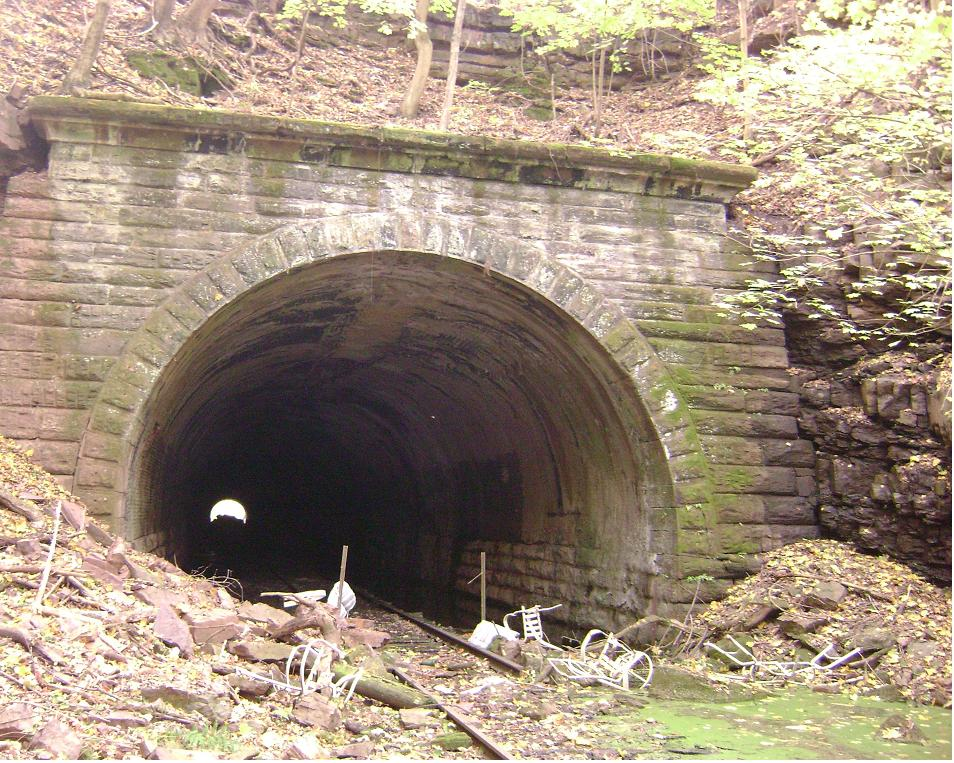
- North portal of the tunnel.
- Interactive map of Phoenixville Tunnel

Overview
- Line: Schuylkill Branch
- Location: Phoenixville, Pennsylvania
- Coordinates: 40.144008°N 75.526420°W
- System: Pennsylvania Railroad; Conrail
- Start: 1884

Operation
- Constructed: Stone; Brick

Technical
- Length: 809.75 ft (246.81 m)
- No. of tracks: Double, later single

The Phoenixville Tunnel, originally called the Fairview Tunnel, was part of the Pennsylvania Schuylkill Valley Railroad in Phoenixville, Pennsylvania.

The ends of the Phoenixville Tunnel are located at 40°08′36″N 75°31′36.6″W and 40°08′30.8″N 75°31′39.9″W.

== History ==
The tunnel was built in 1884. It is approximately 809.75 feet long and 24 feet 8 inches wide. The tunnel, which was later acquired by the Pennsylvania Railroad, runs parallel to the west of Fairview Street, underneath Fillmore Street.

After the First World War increasing competition from automobiles and trucks led to passenger train services being discontinued in 1928. However, freight services continued to use the line. The line, which was used by Conrail from Kimberton to Phoenixville, was abandoned in the 1980s.

It is near the 1835 Phoenixville Black Rock Tunnel 40.147833°N 75.518497°W, the third railroad tunnel to be built in the United States.

== Present day ==
The tunnel is now abandoned. The original brick construction is in poor repair. A large part of the ceiling has collapsed directly under Fillmore Street prompting a three-ton gross vehicle weight limit on the road above. Both ends of the tunnel have been closed and the approaches have been filled in.

The Pennsylvania Schuylkill Valley Railroad rail right of way has been developed into the Schuylkill River Trail, a multi-use recreational / bicycle trail. A fairly steep hill parallels the abandoned tunnel. The ditch that was part of the original railbed can be seen from the trail.

== Gallery ==
The tunnel after its opening in 1884

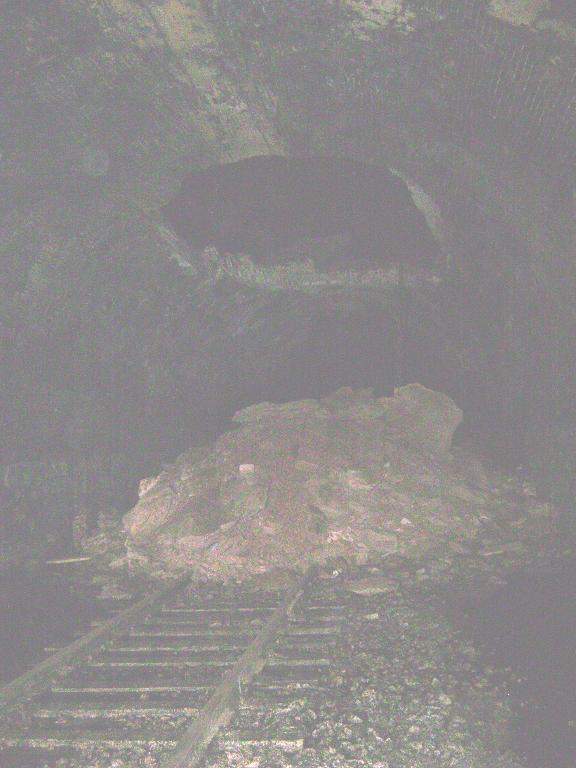
Partial collapse under Fillmore Street
