= Black Rock Tunnel =

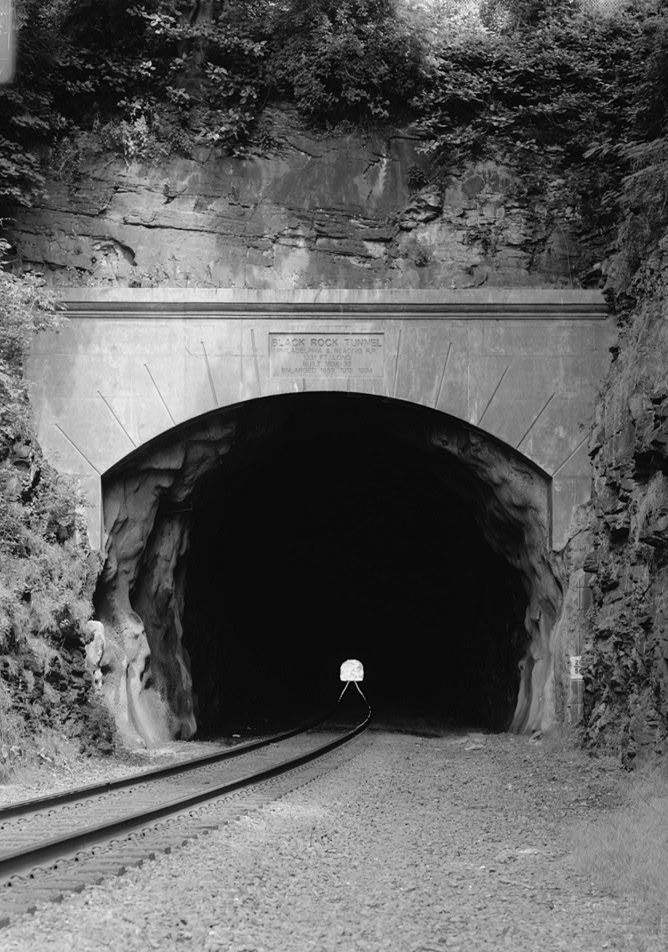
- East end of tunnel, looking NW
- Interactive map of Black Rock Tunnel

Overview
- Location: Phoenixville, Pennsylvania
- Coordinates: 40°08′45″N 75°30′56″W
- Status: Active
- System: Reading Railroad (original); Norfolk Southern (current)

Operation
- Constructed: 1835–1837
- Opened: 1838
- Character: Freight

Technical
- Length: 1,932 feet (589 m)
- No. of tracks: Double (original); Single (current)
- Track gauge: 4 ft 8 1/2 in (1,435 mm)
- Tunnel clearance: 17 feet (5.2 m)

The Black Rock Tunnel is an active rail road tunnel of the old Reading Railroad. The 1835 tunnel was the third rail tunnel constructed in the United States, and is the third oldest still in use. The tunnel is also notable as being the first for which shafts were sunk during construction. The tunnel is cut through a hill in Phoenixville, Pennsylvania, United States. The tunnel and line are now owned by Norfolk Southern as part of its Harrisburg Line.

The Black Rock Tunnel was constructed between 1835 and 1837 and opened in 1838. W. Hasell Wilson was the resident engineer in charge. The tunnel was originally 1,932 feet (589 m) long, 19 feet (5.8 m) wide, and 17 feet (5.2 m) high. The tunnel passes 122 feet (37 m) below the top of the hill. A then-unique feature of the tunnel's construction was the sinking of six, 7-foot (2.1 m) diameter shafts, tangent to the tunnel cross section. These shafts were spaced at 100-foot (30 m) intervals to correct errors in the tunnel alignment. Construction of the tunnel cost an estimated $178,992, equal to $5,411,711 today.

Noted local miner, geologist and paleontologist Charles M. Wheatley examined the rock excavated from the tunnel and identified many previously unknown fossilized species, some of which now bear his name.

In 1858 and 1859 the Black Rock and Flat Rock Tunnels were widened to accommodate the wider rolling stock from the Lebanon Valley Branch. The spacing between the tracks was increased from 4 feet (1.2 m) to 6 feet (1.8 m). The widening of the tunnel was the first project to employ electric detonation of multiple explosive charges.

The northern end of the tunnel is high on a steep bank of the Schuylkill River so the rail line makes a dramatic transition from tunnel to bridge. The ends of the Black Rock Tunnel are located at 40°08′51″N 75°31′06″W and 40°08′39″N 75°30′46.5″W.

== See also ==
- List of tunnels documented by the Historic American Engineering Record in Pennsylvania
- Phoenixville Tunnel
