= Spring Garden Street Tunnel =

Vehicular tunnel under the Philadelphia Art Museum

Coordinates: 39.966°N 75.182°W

The Spring Garden Street Tunnel is a vehicular tunnel under the Philadelphia Museum of Art. The tunnel once carried the SEPTA Route 43 trolley.

== Gallery ==
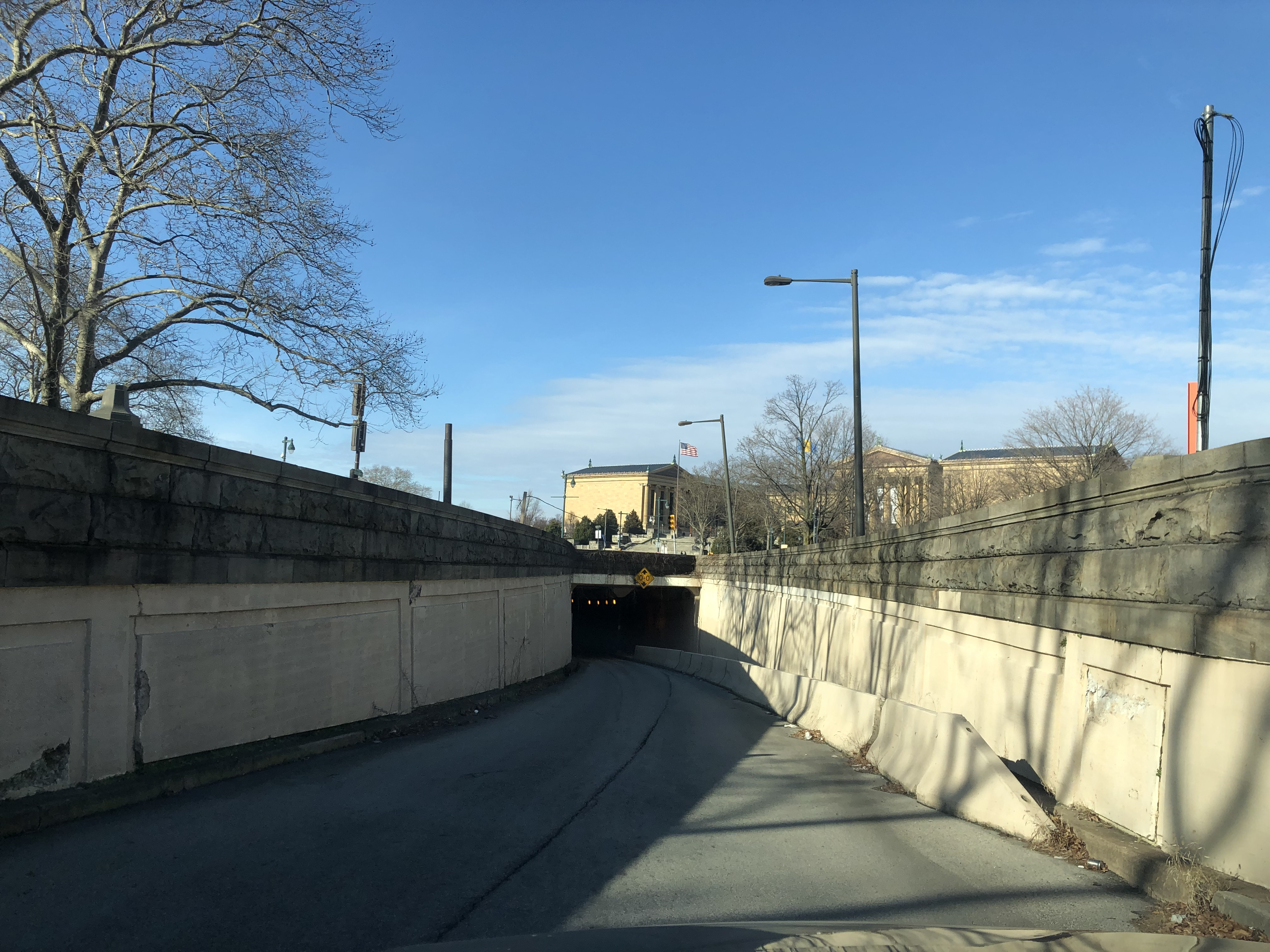

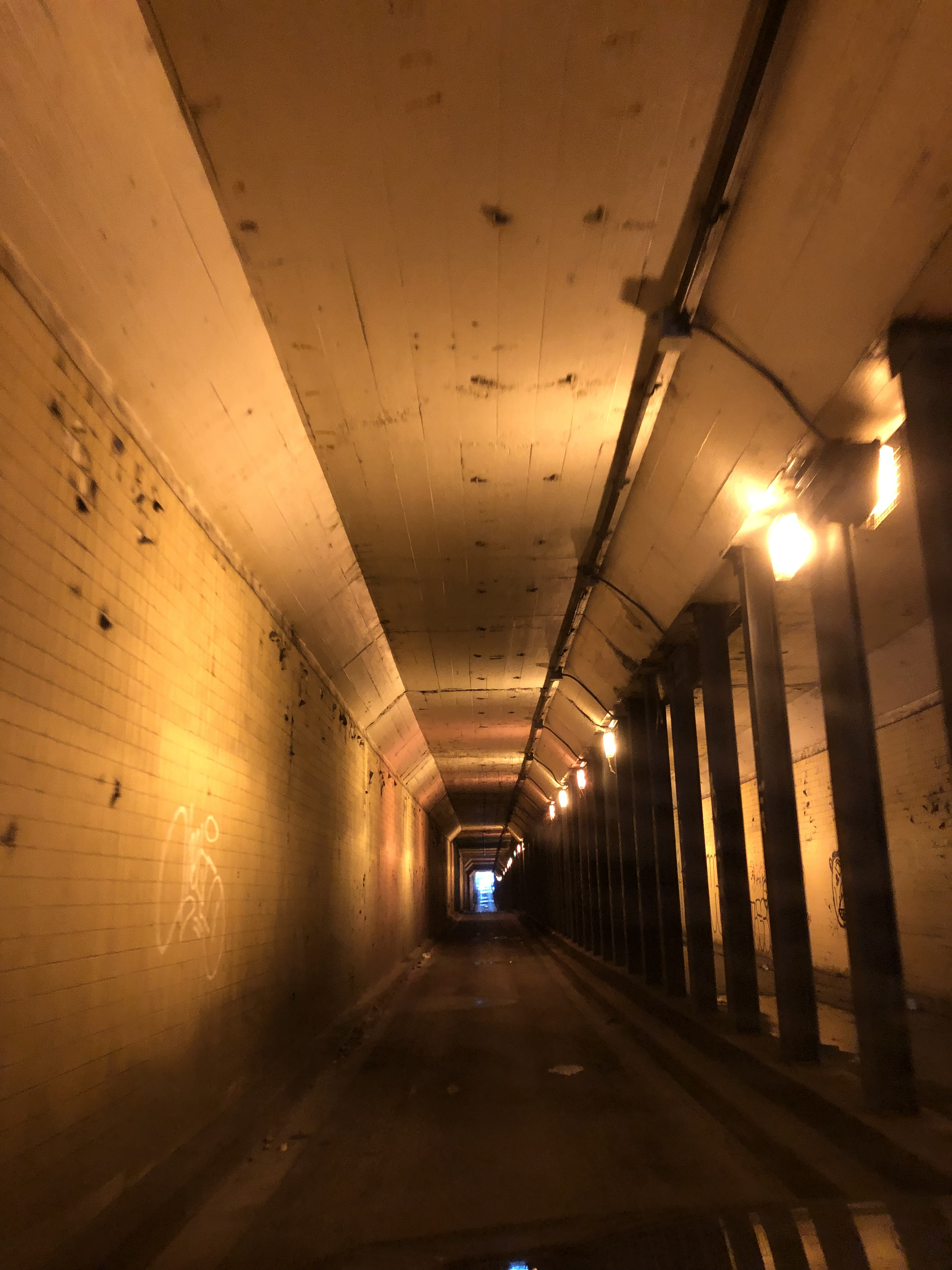
