= Flat Rock Tunnel =

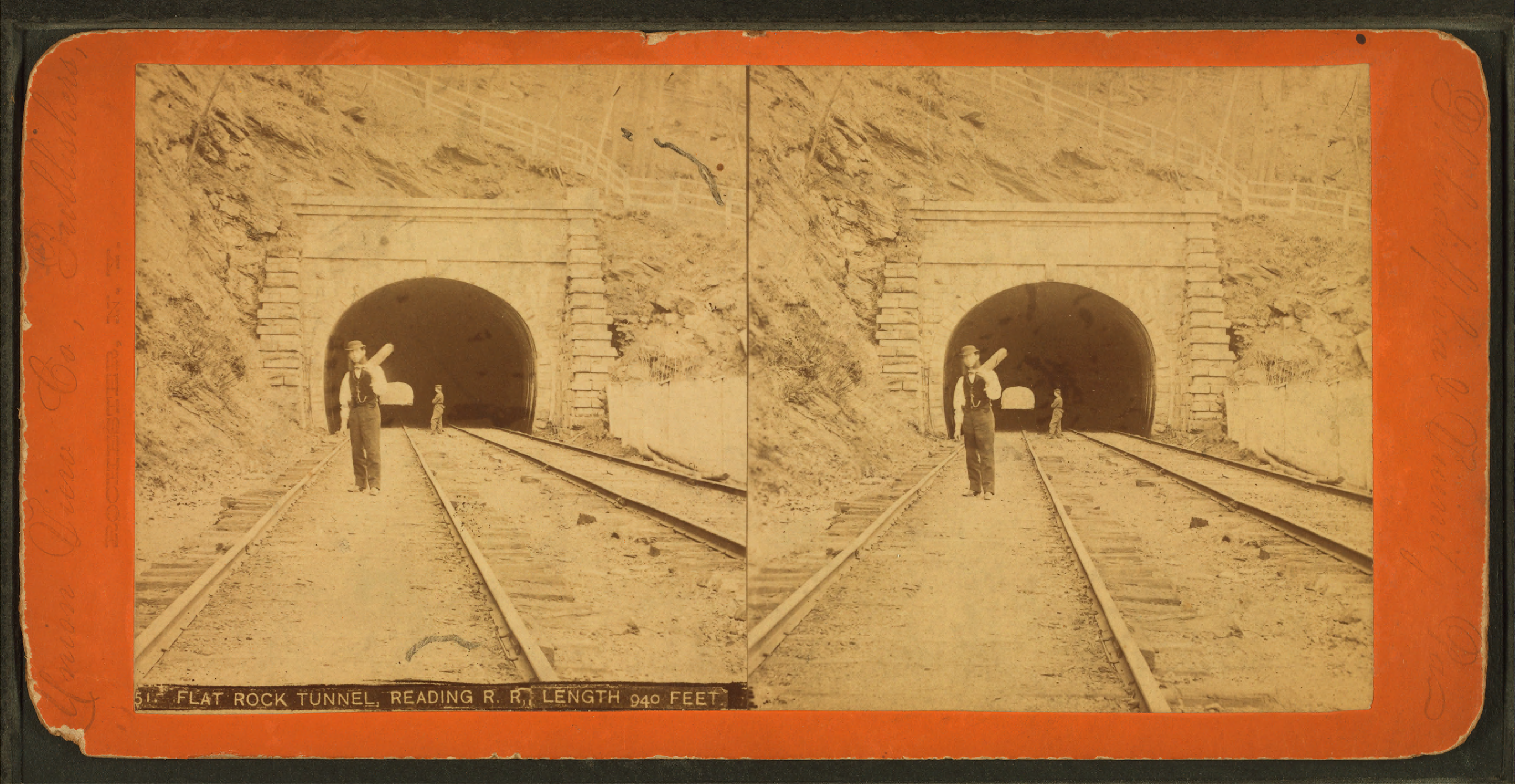
- Stereo pair view
- Interactive map of Flat Rock Tunnel

Overview
- Location: Lower Merion, Montgomery County, near Manayunk, Pennsylvania
- Coordinates: 40°02′07″N 75°14′39″W
- Status: Active
- System: Originally Reading Railroad; Now Norfolk Southern

Operation
- Work began: 1836
- Opened: 1840

Technical
- Length: 940 feet (290 m)
- No. of tracks: Originally Double; Now Single
- Track gauge: 4 ft 8 1/2 in (1,435 mm)

The Flat Rock Tunnel is an active railroad tunnel located on Norfolk Southern's Harrisburg Line near Manayunk, Pennsylvania, United States. The tunnel was built by the Reading Railroad for its line along the Schuylkill River.

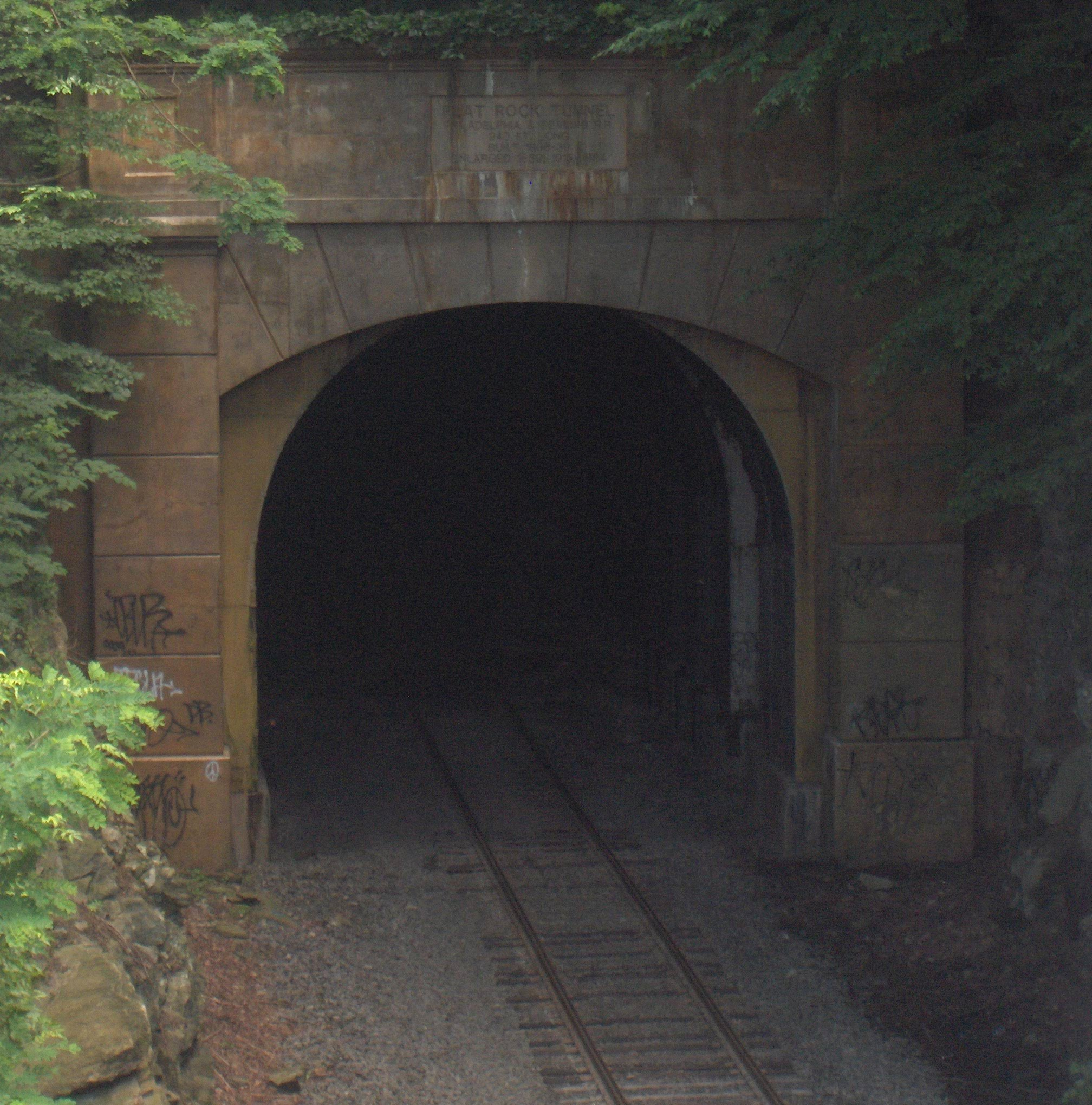
Flat Rock Tunnel in Pennsylvania, western portal

Construction of the tunnel started in 1836 and it opened in 1840. In 1858-9 the Flat Rock and Black Rock Tunnels were widened to accommodate the wider rolling stock from the Lebanon Valley Branch. The spacing between the tracks was increased from 4 feet (1.2 m) to 6 feet (1.8 m). The widening of the tunnel was the first project to employ electric detonation of multiple explosive charges.

== See also ==
- List of tunnels documented by the Historic American Engineering Record in Pennsylvania
