= Carr's Tunnel =

Abandoned railway tunnel in Pennsylvania, US

Coordinates: 40.310°N 79.467°W

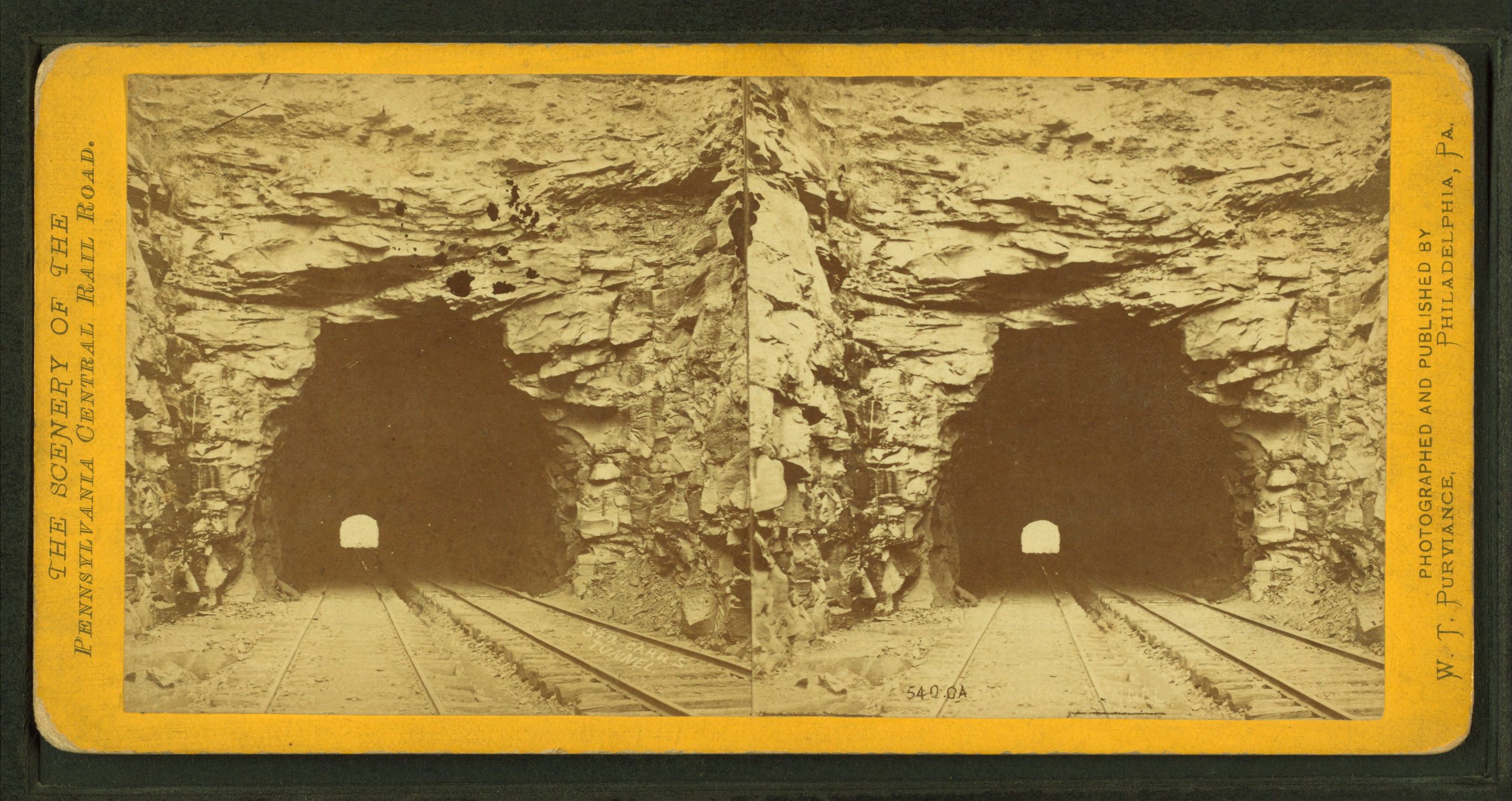
- Stereoscopic view of the tunnel
- Interactive map of Carr's Tunnel

Overview
- Location: Greensburg, Pennsylvania
- Status: abandoned

Operation
- Constructed: rock bored, brick lined
- Opened: January, 1856
- Owner: Pennsylvania Railroad

Technical
- Length: 825 ft (251 m)
- No. of tracks: double

Carr's Tunnel is an abandoned railway tunnel in Greensburg, Pennsylvania. Known locally as Witches' Tunnel, (commonly used by children and residents in the area), it was originally built in 1856 for the Pennsylvania Railroad. It was brick-lined in 1868–1869. The railway line it was associated with, now dismantled, once ran from Donohoe Station to the now-vanished Carney Station, near the Carney coal mine, and on to Latrobe.

In recent years single-family residences have been built directly adjacent to the abandoned tunnel.

== Gallery ==
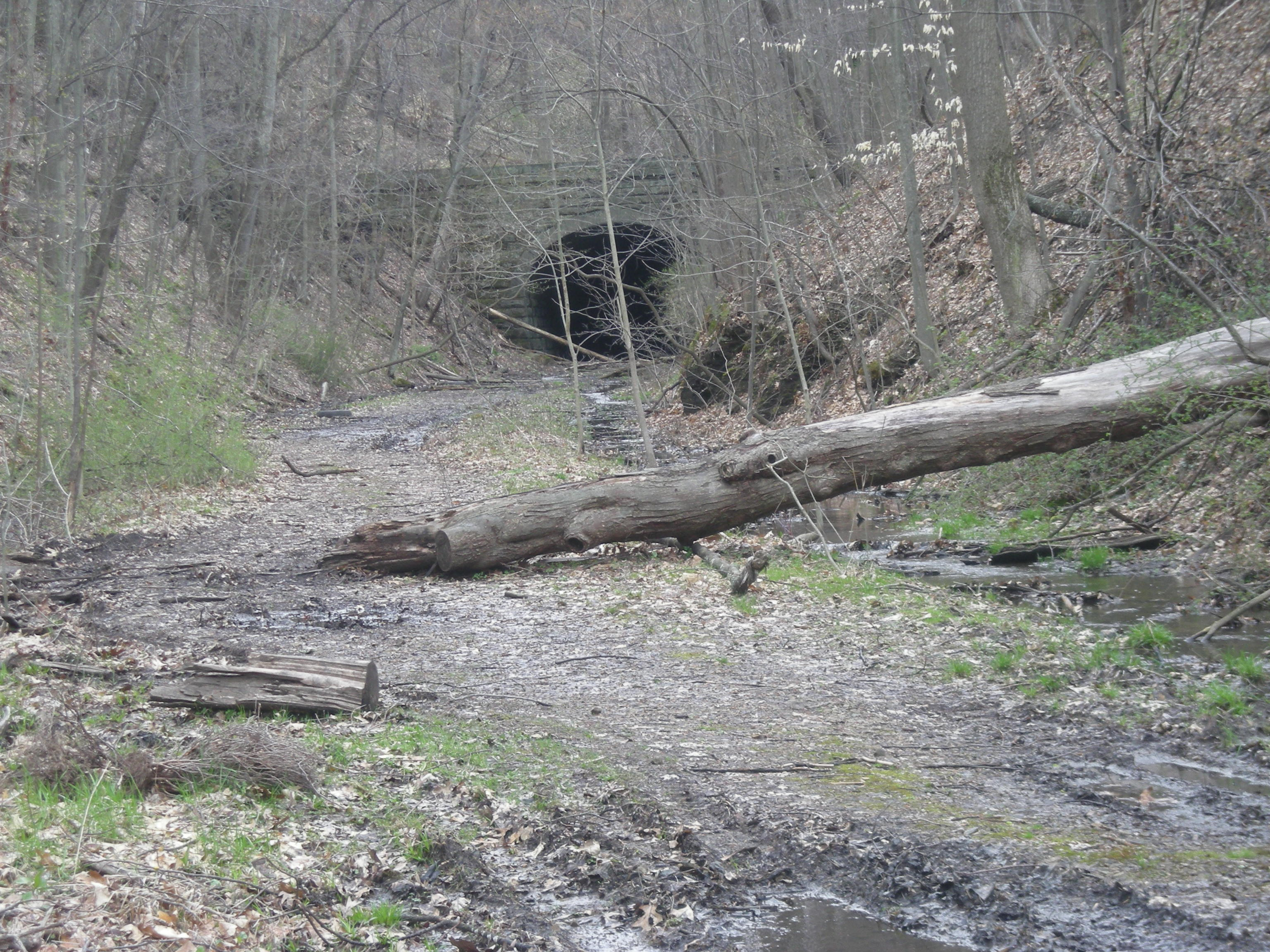
Carr's Tunnel in 2013

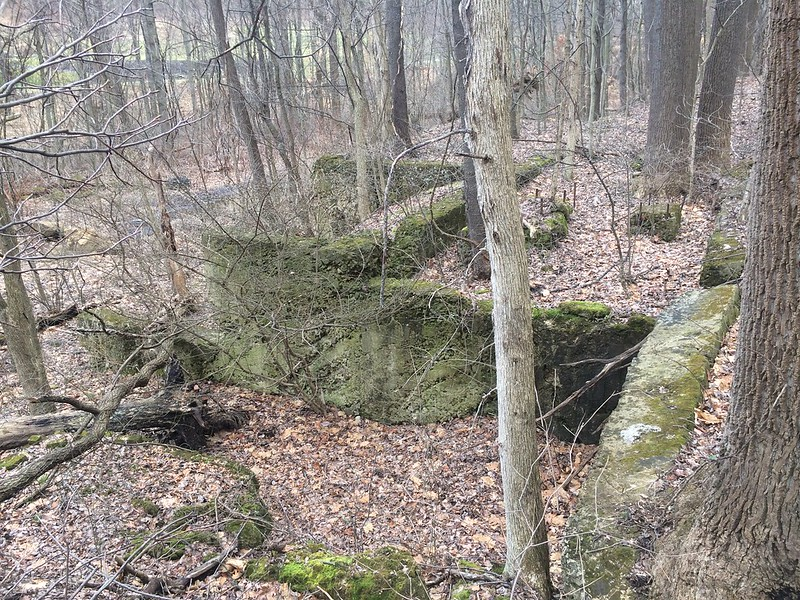
Remains of Carney Mine adjacent to Carr's Tunnel
