= Conemaugh Township, Cambria County, Pennsylvania =

Township in Pennsylvania, US

Coordinates: 40°19′46″N 78°53′20″W

- Township
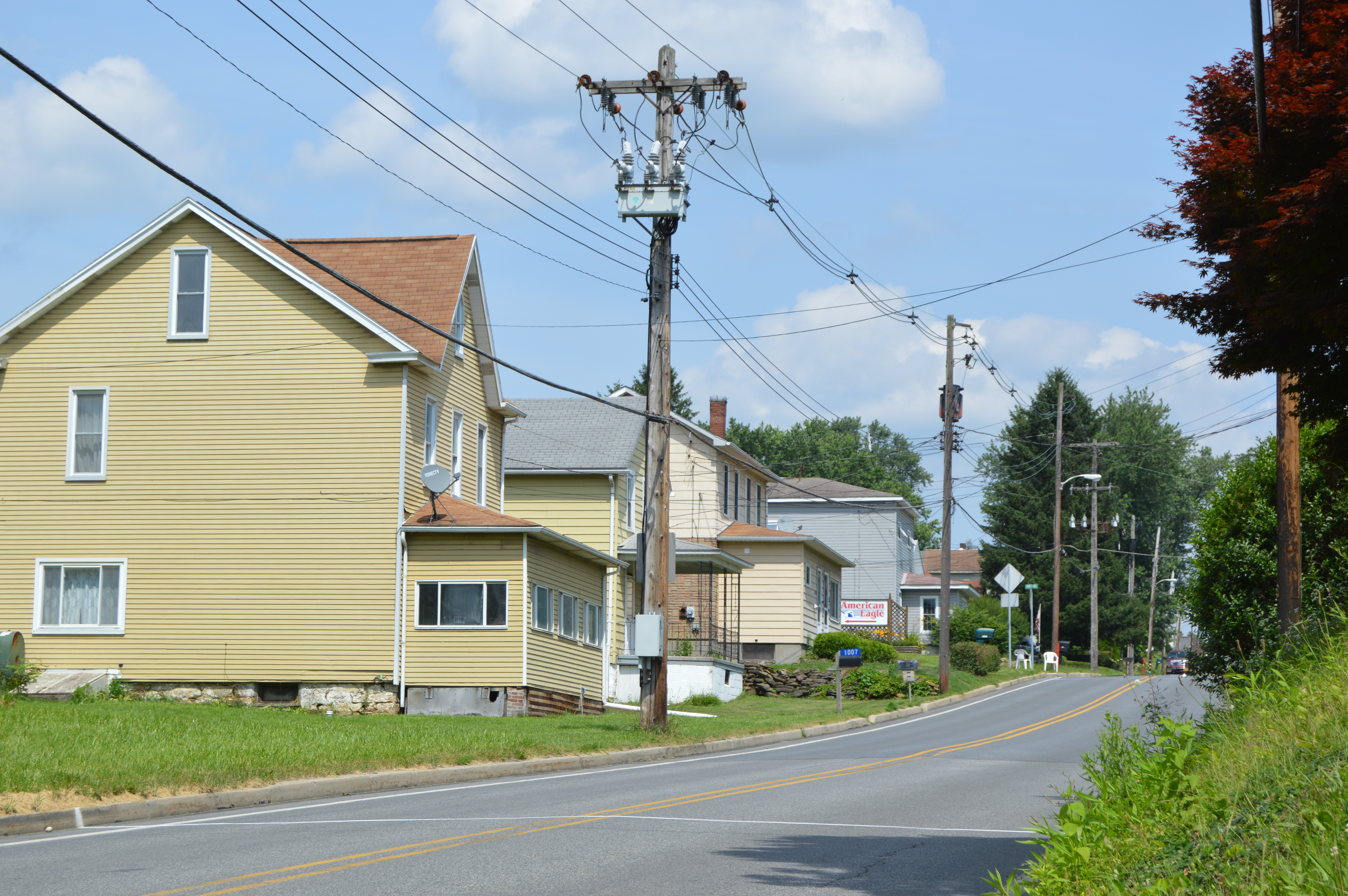
- Houses on Frankstown Road, near Daisytown

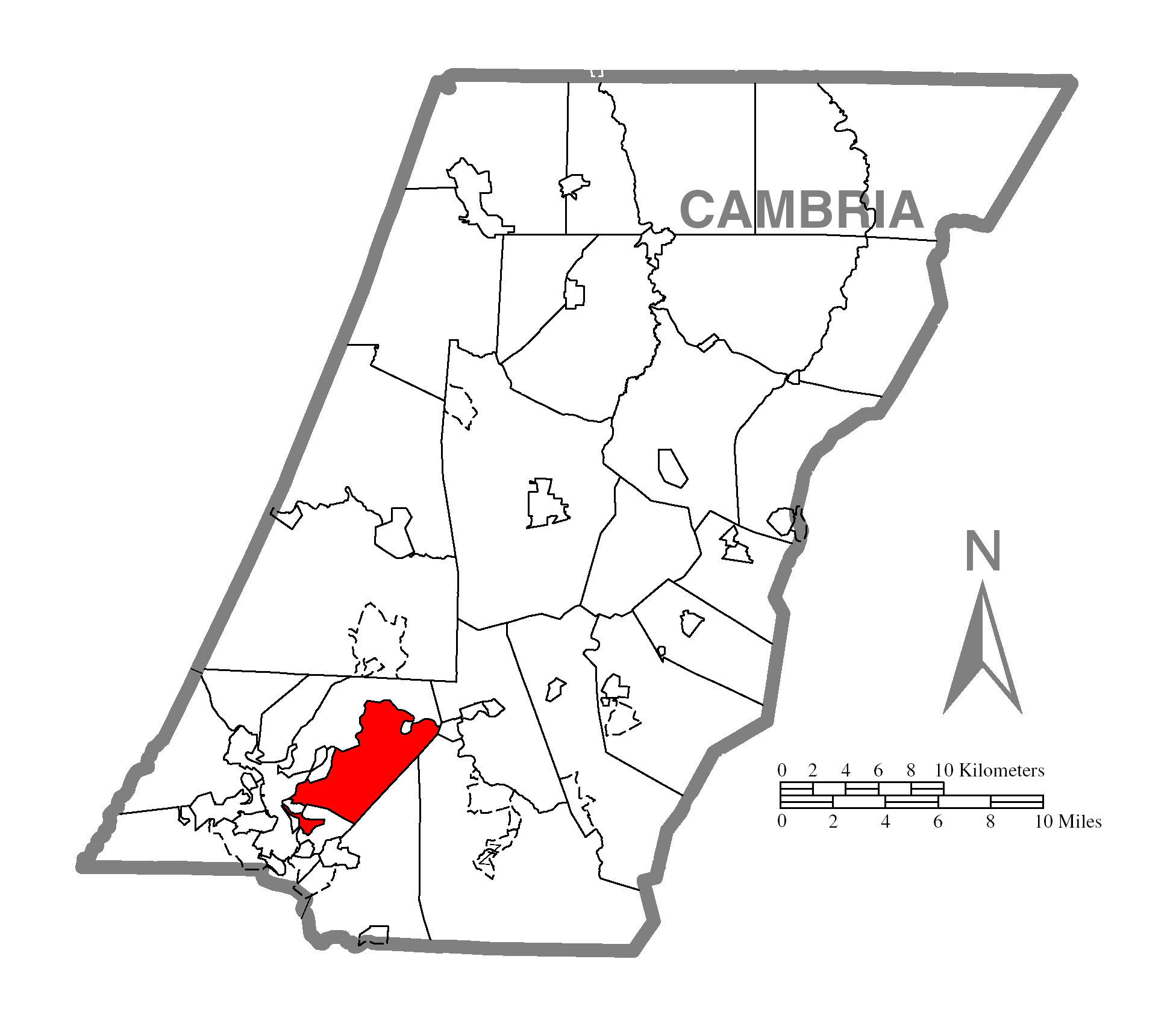
- Map of Cambria County, Pennsylvania highlighting Conemaugh Township

- Map of Cambria County, Pennsylvania
- Country: United States
- State: Pennsylvania
- County: Cambria
- Incorporated: 1801

Area
  - Total: 11.37 sq mi (29.46 km^{2})
  - Land: 11.29 sq mi (29.23 km^{2})
  - Water: 0.089 sq mi (0.23 km^{2})

Population (2020)
  - Total: 1,943 ▼
  - Estimate (2021): 1,924
  - Density: 168.6/sq mi (65.11/km^{2})
- Time zone: UTC-5 (Eastern (EST))
  - Summer (DST): UTC-4 (EDT)
- Area code: 814
- FIPS code: 42-021-15552

Conemaugh Township is a township in Cambria County, Pennsylvania, United States. The population was 1,943 as of the 2020 census. It is part of the Johnstown, Pennsylvania Metropolitan Statistical Area.

== History ==
A portion of the Allegheny Portage Railroad National Historic Site surrounding Staple Bend Tunnel is located in Conemaugh Township and was listed on the National Register of Historic Places in 1966. The tunnel itself was listed in 1994.

== Geography ==
Conemaugh Township is located in southwestern Cambria County and is bordered to the west by the city of Johnstown. The Little Conemaugh River forms the northern and northwestern edge of the township, except where the township borders the borough of Franklin. The borough of Daisytown touches the southwestern corner of the township, and South Fork touches the northeastern corner. Unincorporated communities within the township include Bon Air, Parkstown, and Cover Hill.

According to the United States Census Bureau, the township has a total area of 11.4 square miles (29.5 km^{2}), of which 11.3 square miles (29.2 km^{2}) is land and 0.08 square miles (0.2 km^{2}), or 0.79%, is water.

== Communities ==
=== Unincorporated communities ===
- Bonair
- Newtown
- Parkstown
- Wissingertown

== Demographics ==
Historical population
Census	Pop.	Note	%±
2000	2,145		—
2010	2,012		−6.2%
2020	1,943		−3.4%
2021 (est.)	1,924		−1.0%
U.S. Decennial Census

As of the census of 2000, there were 2,145 people, 856 households, and 632 families living in the township. The population density was 189.8 inhabitants per square mile (73.3/km^{2}). There were 889 housing units at an average density of 78.7 per square mile (30.4/km^{2}). The racial composition of the township was 98.69% White, 0.89% African American, 0.19% Asian, and 0.23% from two or more races. Hispanic or Latino of any race were 0.70% of the population.

There were 856 households, out of which 26.8% had children under the age of 18 living with them, 63.2% were married couples living together, 5.8% had a female householder with no husband present, and 26.1% were non-families. 23.1% of all households were made up of individuals, and 13.6% had someone living alone who was 65 years of age or older. The average household size was 2.51 and the average family size was 2.94.

In the township the population was spread out, with 21.0% under the age of 18, 5.7% from 18 to 24, 26.7% from 25 to 44, 26.7% from 45 to 64, and 19.9% who were 65 years of age or older. The median age was 43 years. For every 100 females, there were 95.5 males. For every 100 females age 18 and over, there were 95.5 males.

The median income for a household in the township was $29,805, and the median income for a family was $38,867. Males had a median income of $26,473 versus $19,563 for females. The per capita income for the township was $14,157. About 8.2% of families and 8.7% of the population were below the poverty line, including 13.1% of those under age 18 and 5.2% of those age 65 or over.
