= Sheraden station =

Sheraden
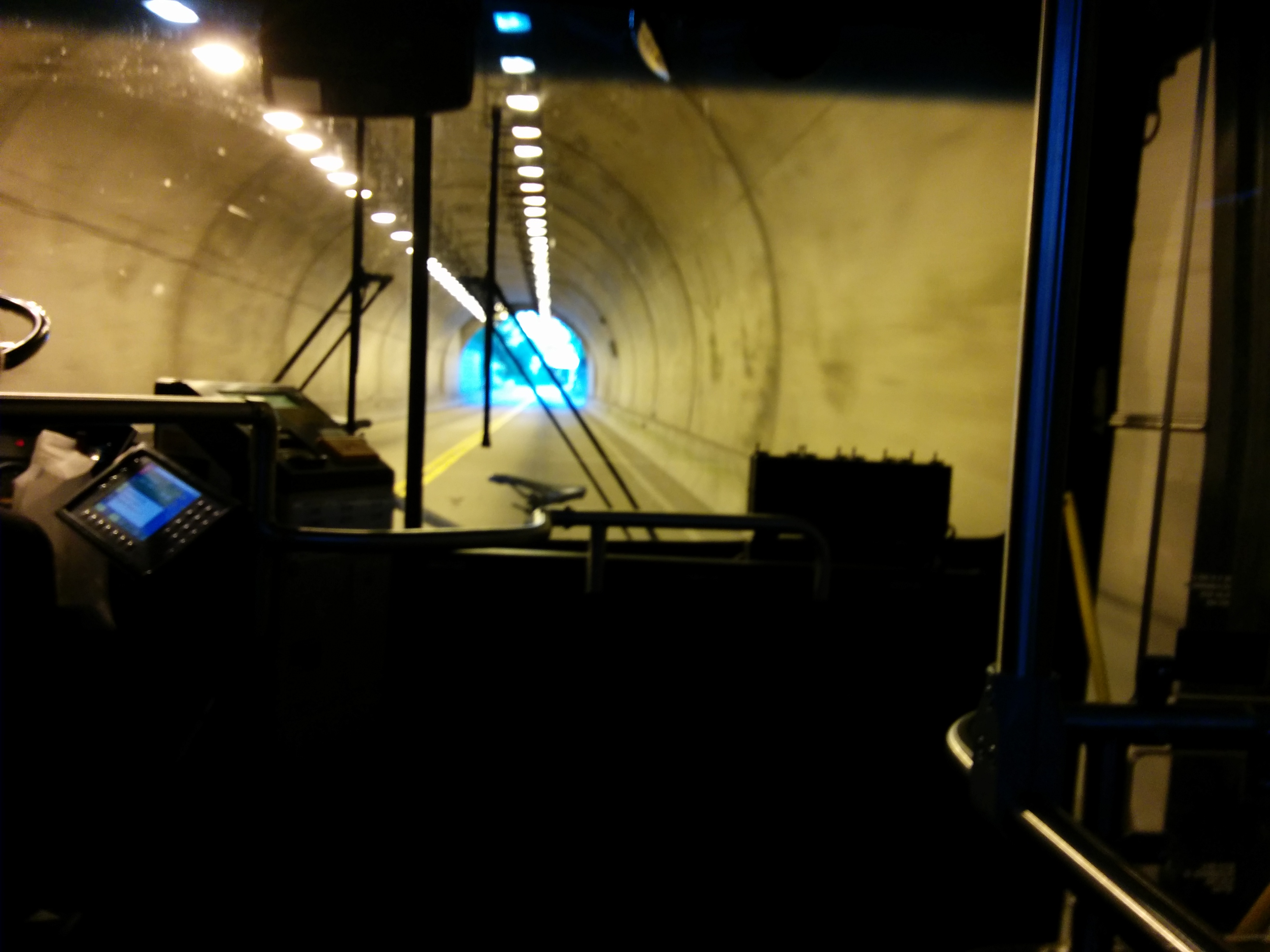
- East side of Cork Run Tunnel connects to the Sheraden station

General information
- Location: West Busway at Chartiers Avenue; Pittsburgh, Pennsylvania
- Coordinates: 40°27′10″N 80°03′11″W
- Owner: Pittsburgh Regional Transit (PRT)
- Platforms: 2 side platforms
- Connections: PRT: 26; PRT: 28X (to Airport/Downtown)

Construction
- Structure type: Below-grade
- Parking: 177 spaces
- Accessible: Yes

History
- Opened: September 2000

Passengers
- 2019: 681 (weekday boardings)

Services
Preceding station	Pittsburgh Regional Transit	Following station
Ingram toward Carnegie	West Busway	Terminus
Location

Sheraden station is a below-grade busway station operated by Pittsburgh Regional Transit in the Sheraden neighborhood of Pittsburgh, Pennsylvania. The station is located on the West Busway and is served by routes 28X, G2, G3 and G31. The station is located slightly below grade as the Berry Street Tunnel is located just south of the station. This is the northernmost station on the busway. Just north of the station, the dedicated roadway connects with Pennsylvania Route 51, which routes use to connect with Downtown Pittsburgh.

The station has a 177-space park and ride lot. Despite being the last inbound station on the busway, it has the most use, seeing 681 weekday boardings in 2019.
