= West Busway =

Busway in Pittsburgh, Pennsylvania

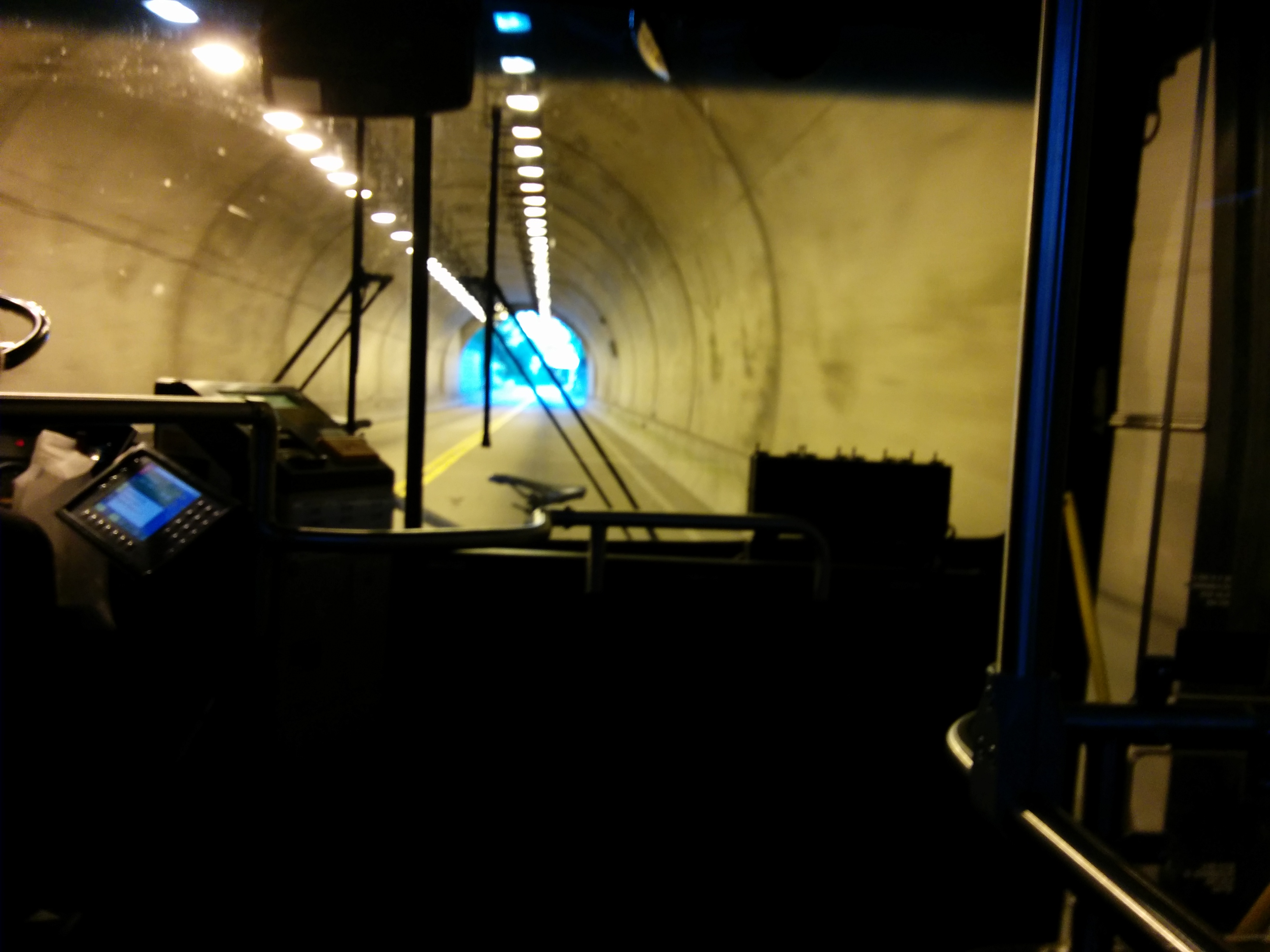
- Cork Run Tunnel portion of the West Busway

Overview
- Locale: Pittsburgh
- Termini: Sheraden; Carnegie
- Stations: 6

Service
- Type: Bus rapid transit
- System: Pittsburgh Regional Transit

History
- Opened: September 2000

Technical
- Line length: 5.1 mi (8.2 km)
- Operating speed: 50 mph (80 km/h) (top)
Route map
West Busway highlighted in green

The West Busway is a two-lane bus rapid transit highway serving the western portions of the city of Pittsburgh and several western suburbs. The busway runs for 5.1 miles (8.2 km) from the southern shore of the Ohio River near Downtown Pittsburgh to Carnegie, following former railroad right-of-way on the Panhandle Route. It broke ground on October 27, 1994 and is owned and maintained by Pittsburgh Regional Transit, the public transit provider for Allegheny County and the Pittsburgh region. The transit thoroughfare was opened in September 2000. Following the naming convention of each busway being designated by a color, bus routes that use the West Busway begin with a "G" for green.

In addition to running along the abandoned railroad right of way, the West Busway also reuses the historic Cork Run Tunnel, also known as the Berry Street Tunnel, which was heavily refurbished for the busway

The Institute for Transportation and Development Policy (ITDP), under its BRT Standard, has classified the West Busway as a "Basic BRT" corridor.

== Routes ==
Four Pittsburgh Regional Transit bus routes currently serve the West Busway.

One route, G2 West Busway–All Stops travels the length of the busway and also serves Downtown Pittsburgh, connecting with the East Busway, via West Carson Street (PA 51) and the Fort Pitt Bridge. Buses operate every 30 minutes.

Another important route is the 28X Airport Flyer which uses the West Busway as far south as Bell Station where dedicated ramps connect the Busway to Interstate 376. The Airport Flyer has a stop restriction with buses outbound to the Airport only stopping to pick up passengers, with drop-offs along the busway prohibited. Buses operate every 30 minutes.

Following the naming convention of each busway being designated by a color, most bus routes that use the West Busway begin with a "G" for green.

Route	Route Name	Destination	Service	Notes
28X	Airport Flyer	Pittsburgh International Airport	Daily, stop restrictions	Additional stops near Robinson Towne Center.
G2	West Busway–All Stops	Carnegie to Steel Plaza station	Daily	Does not go to East Busway
G3	Moon Flyer	Moon to East Busway at Penn Station	Weekday peak periods	Makes stops along Cherrington Parkway
G31	Bridgeville Flyer	Bridgeville to East Busway at Penn Station	Weekday peak periods	Makes stops along Washington Pike

== Stations ==
Station Name	Neighborhood/Borough	Routes	Notes
Sheraden	Sheraden	28X G2 G3 G31	Park and ride: 177 spaces
Ingram	Ingram	28X G2 G3 G31	
Crafton	Crafton	28X G2 G3 G31	Park and ride: 106 spaces
Idlewood	Crafton	28X G2 G3 G31	Park and ride: 33 spaces
Bell	Carnegie	28X G2 G3 G31	Park and ride: 34 spaces
Carnegie	Carnegie	G2	Park and ride: 163 spaces G31 stops nearby off-busway
