= Mineral Point, Pennsylvania =

Unincorporated community in Pennsylvania, US

- Unincorporated community
- Location within Pennsylvania Location within the United States
- Coordinates: 40°22′46″N 78°50′07″W
- Country: United States
- State: Pennsylvania
- County: Cambria
- Township: East Taylor
- Elevation: 1,375 ft (419 m)

Population
  - Total: 102
- Time zone: UTC-5 (Eastern (EST))
  - Summer (DST): UTC-4 (EDT)
- Area code: 814
- GNIS feature ID: 1181316

Mineral Point is an unincorporated community in Cambria County, Pennsylvania, United States.

== Great Flood of 1889 ==
Mineral Point was destroyed in the Great Flood of 1889 on May 31 when the South Fork Dam failed, located on the south fork of the Little Conemaugh River. Mineral Point, located approximately one mile (1.6 km) below the Conemaugh Viaduct, was the second populated place, after South Fork, to be hit by the rapid waters from the former Lake Conemaugh. About 30 families lived within the village of Mineral Point. After the flood, there were no structures, no topsoil, no sub-soil – only the bedrock was left. Approximately 16 citizens of Mineral Point perished in the flood.
