= Carnegie station (Pittsburgh Regional Transit) =

Busway station in Carnegie, Pennsylvania, US

Carnegie

General information
- Location: West Busway at Jefferson Street; Carnegie, Pennsylvania
- Coordinates: 40°24′22″N 80°05′24″W
- Owner: Pittsburgh Regional Transit (PRT)
- Platforms: 2 side platforms
- Connections: PRT: G31

Construction
- Structure type: At-grade
- Parking: 215 spaces
- Accessible: Yes

History
- Opened: September 2000

Passengers
- 2019: 578 (weekday boardings)

Services
Preceding station	Pittsburgh Regional Transit	Following station
Terminus	West Busway	Bell toward Sheraden
Location

Carnegie station is an at-grade busway station operated by Pittsburgh Regional Transit in Carnegie, Pennsylvania. The station is located at the southern terminus of the West Busway and is only served by route G2 West Busway-All Stops. Route G31 Bridgeville Flyer enters and exits the busway just north of this station at Campbells Run Road/Chartiers Avenue and makes stops nearby.

The station has a 215-space park and ride lot.
