= Cork Run Tunnel =

Tunnel in Pittsburgh and Ingram, Pennsylvania

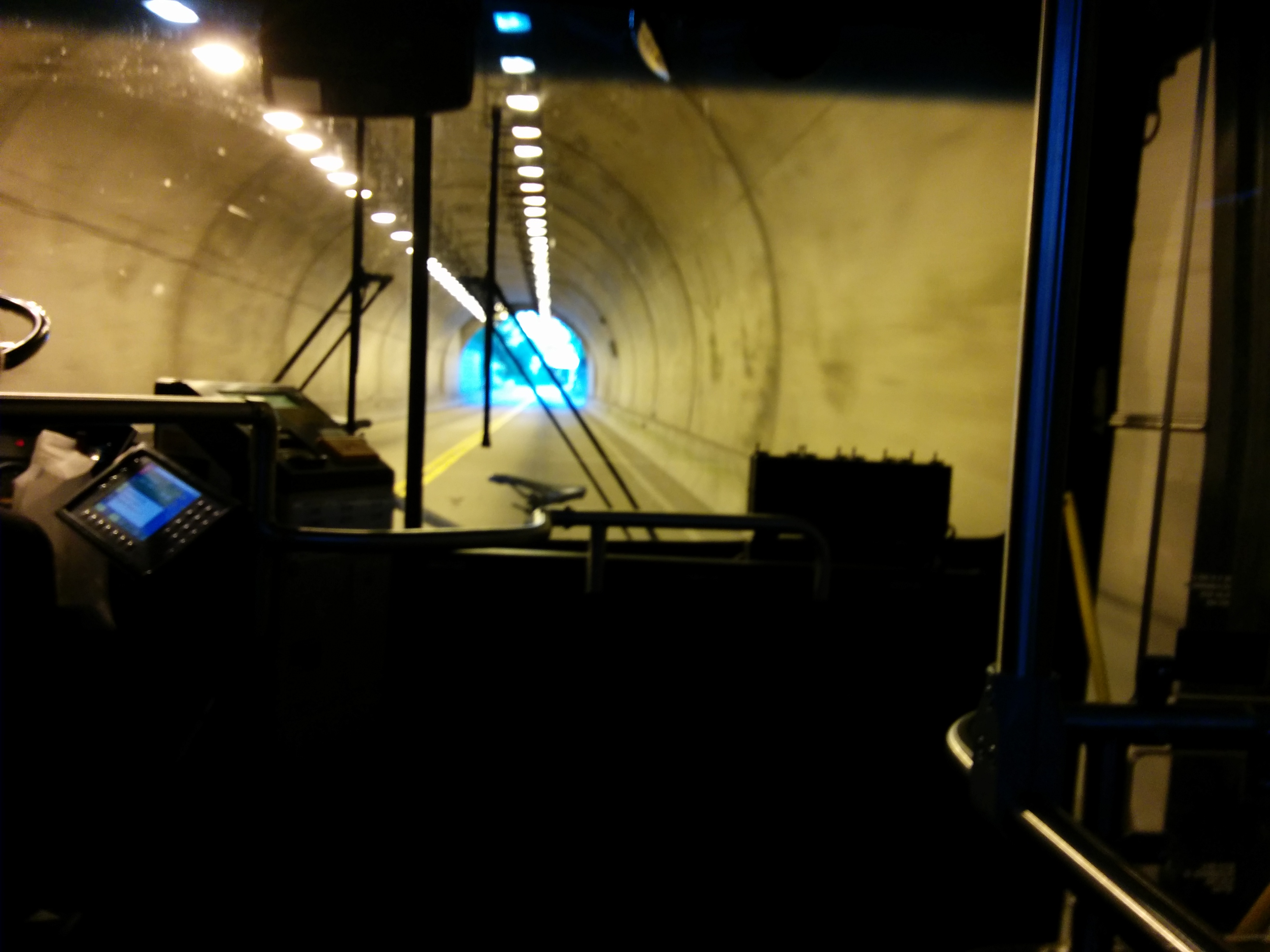
- Interior of the tunnel as seen from a bus, July 2015
- Interactive map of Cork Run Tunnel

Overview
- Location: Pittsburgh, Pennsylvania
- Coordinates: 40.44889°N 80.06232°W
- Status: In use, part of the West Busway

Operation
- Work began: 1851
- Opened: 1865
- Reopened: 2000
- Owner: Pittsburgh Regional Transit

Technical
- Length: 2,100 ft (640 m)
- No. of tracks: 1 (1865–1873); 2 (1873–)
- Track gauge: 4 ft 8 1/2 in (1,435 mm) (1865–1980)
- Tunnel clearance: 22 ft (6.7 m), 16.5 ft (5.0 m) clearance
- Width: 34 ft (10 m), 30 ft (9.1 m) at roadway

The Cork Run Tunnel, also known as the Berry Street Tunnel, is one of nine tunnels built in Pittsburgh, Pennsylvania on the original Pittsburgh and Steubenville Railroad. The tunnel was built beginning in 1851 as a single-track bore 2,100 feet (640 m) long, approached by deep open cuts, to connect central Pittsburgh with points to the west, on the south side of the Ohio River. A shaft was sunk from the overlying ridge to a point near the midpoint of the tunnel to speed construction and to provide ventilation. Work was suspended in 1856 due to financial troubles, and resumed in 1862. The tunnel was completed in 1865.

Immediately upon completion it was apparent that the tunnel needed two lines. The originally 12-foot-wide (3.7 m) tunnel was widened to 25 feet (7.6 m) starting in 1870 for two tracks, and was completed in 1873. Nevertheless, the tunnel continued to represent a bottleneck, since large cars could not pass each other without causing derailments, which happened frequently. By 1889 work began on the Ohio Connecting Railway to relieve the tunnel. At the same time, the Cork's Run valley was filled in to build the Sheraden Yards, feeding the Cork Run Tunnel.

By 1906 the tunnel lining had deteriorated, becoming unstable and requiring almost continuous repair. Since the tunnel was so narrow, workers had to take shelter as trains passed. At least one fatal work accident happened, and several cave-ins closed the tunnel. Around 1900 a 300-foot (91 m) section of the tunnel was cut open to the sky at the Pittsburgh end. By 1947 the Cork Run Tunnel was the only tunnel in the railroad's Panhandle Route that had not been fully "daylighted", or cut open to the sky along its entire length.

Between 1996 and 1997 tunnel was refurbished and widened again to 34 feet (10 m) using the New Austrian tunneling method. It re-opened in September 2000 to serve as the link between Pittsburgh's Sheraden neighborhood and the community of Ingram on the Pittsburgh Regional Transit's West Busway.

== Gallery ==
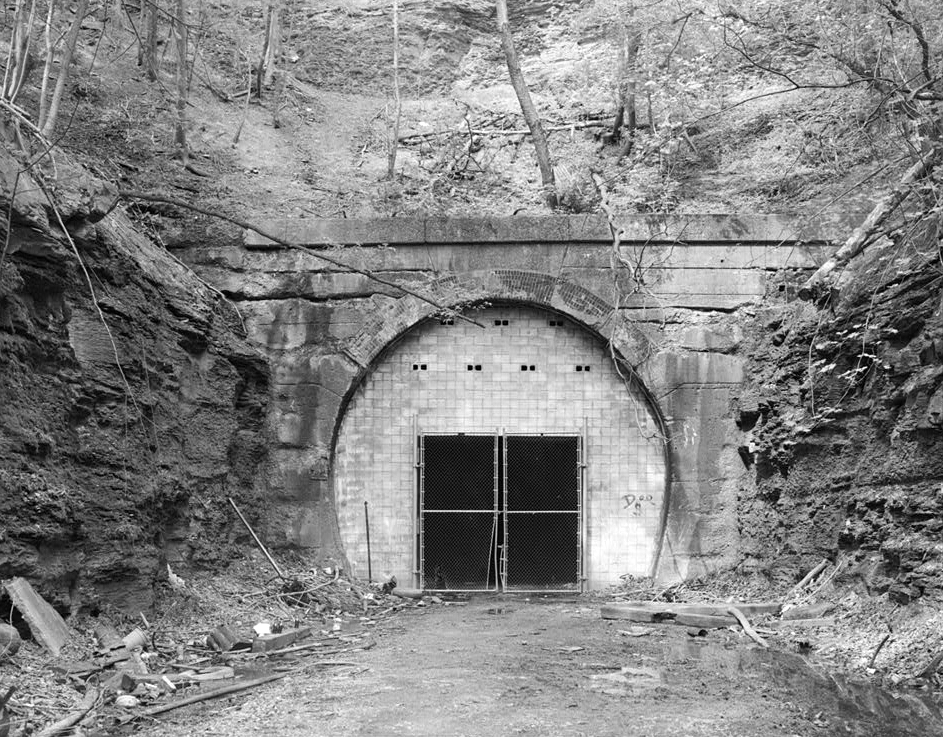
Ingram portal, 1995

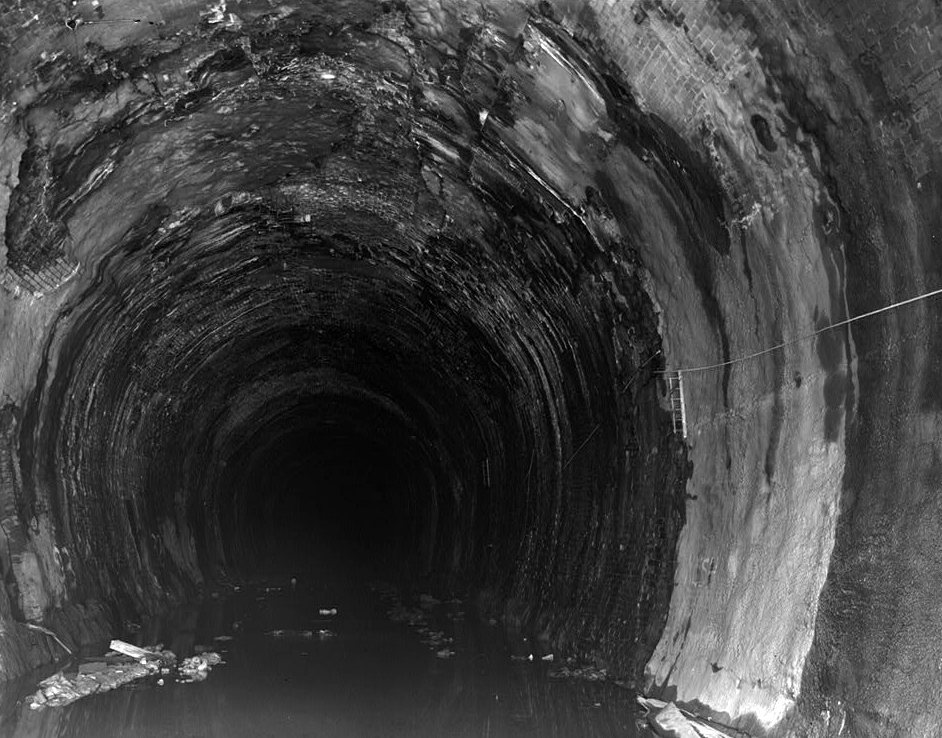
Interior, 1995

== See also ==
- List of tunnels documented by the Historic American Engineering Record in Pennsylvania
