= Sassamansville, Pennsylvania =

Unincorporated community in Pennsylvania, US

- Unincorporated community
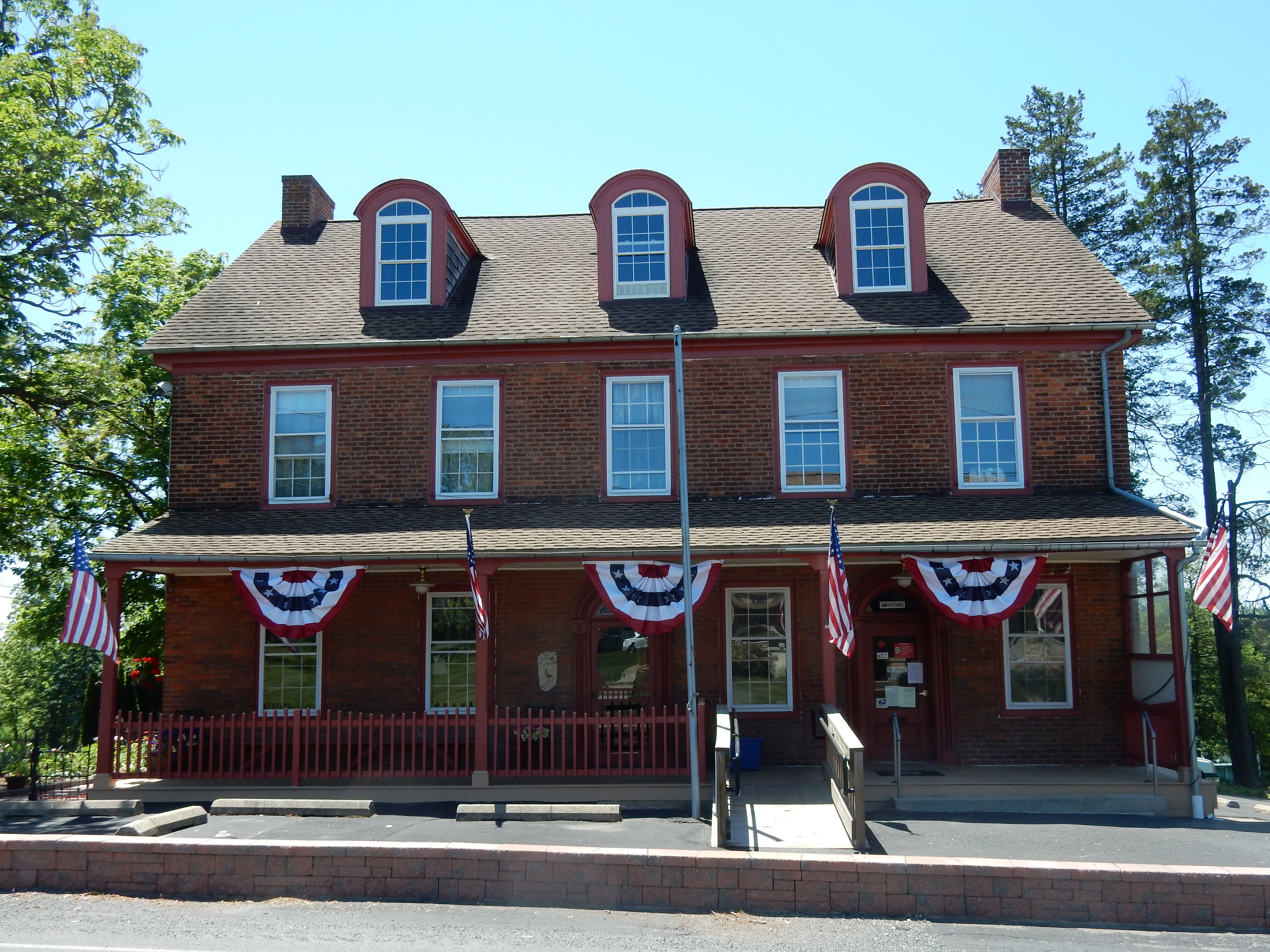
- Sassamansville Post Office

- Location within Pennsylvania
- Coordinates: 40°20′31″N 75°34′20″W
- Country: United States
- State: Pennsylvania
- County: Montgomery
- Township: Douglass and New Hanover
- Elevation: 351 ft (107 m)
- Time zone: UTC-5 (Eastern (EST))
  - Summer (DST): UTC-4 (EDT)
- ZIP code: 19472
- Area codes: 610 and 484
- GNIS feature ID: 1186995

Sassamansville (SAS-a-minz-vil) is an unincorporated community in northwestern Montgomery County, Pennsylvania, United States on Hoffmansville Road, approximately 1 1/2 miles northwest of Route 663.

It is served by the Boyertown Area School District.

== History ==
The community is home to The Bauman Family fruit butter factory.

== Geography ==
This community is located mainly in New Hanover Township, but is also partly in Douglass Township. It is drained by the Swamp Creek into the Perkiomen Creek. The Sassamansville telephone exchange uses area code 610.

While the village has its own box post office with the zip code of 19472, portions of Sassamansville are served by the Barto, Gilbertsville, and Perkiomenville post offices with zip codes of 19504, 19525, and 18074, respectively.

== Gallery ==
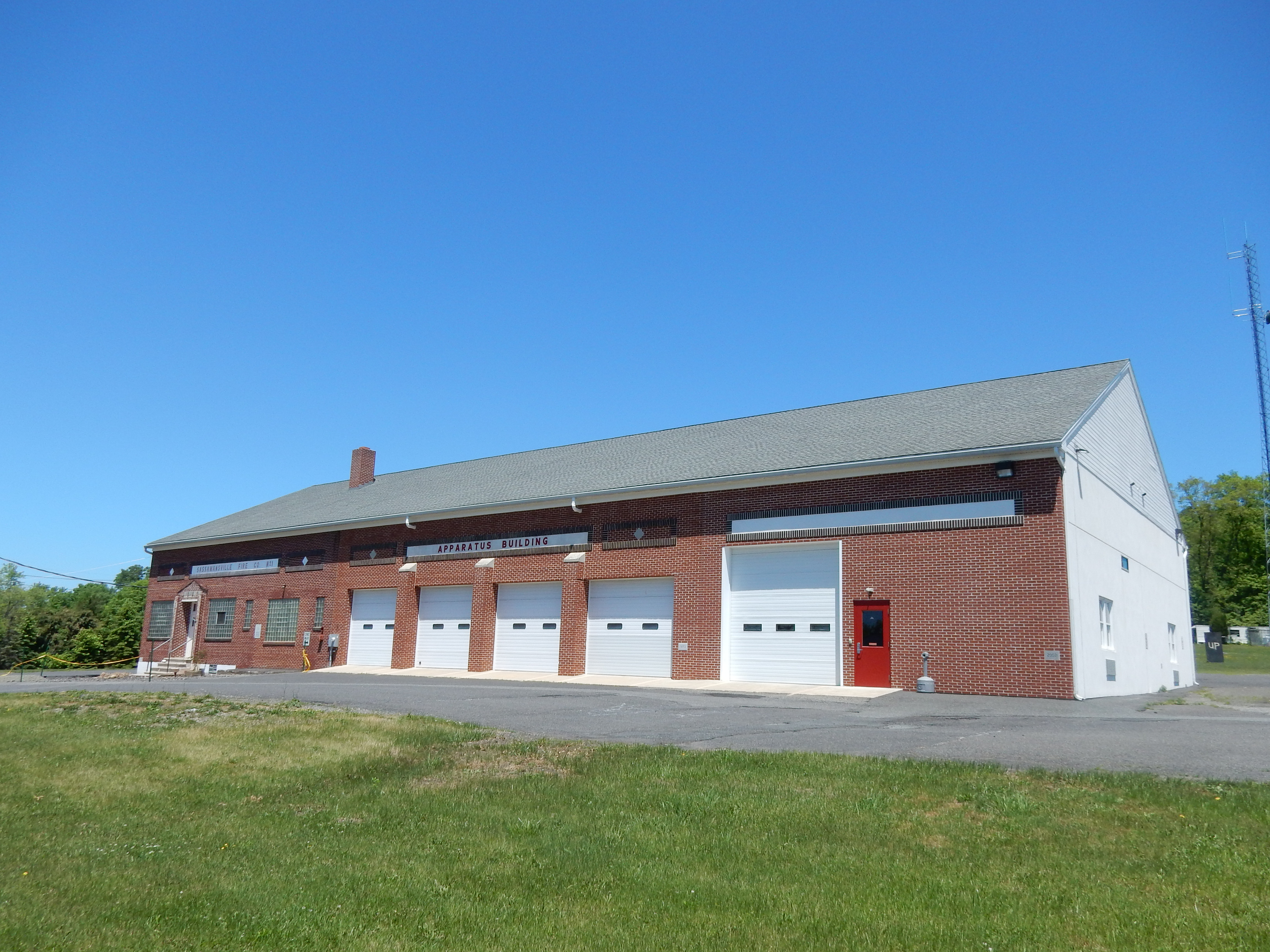
Sassamansville Fire Co. No. 1

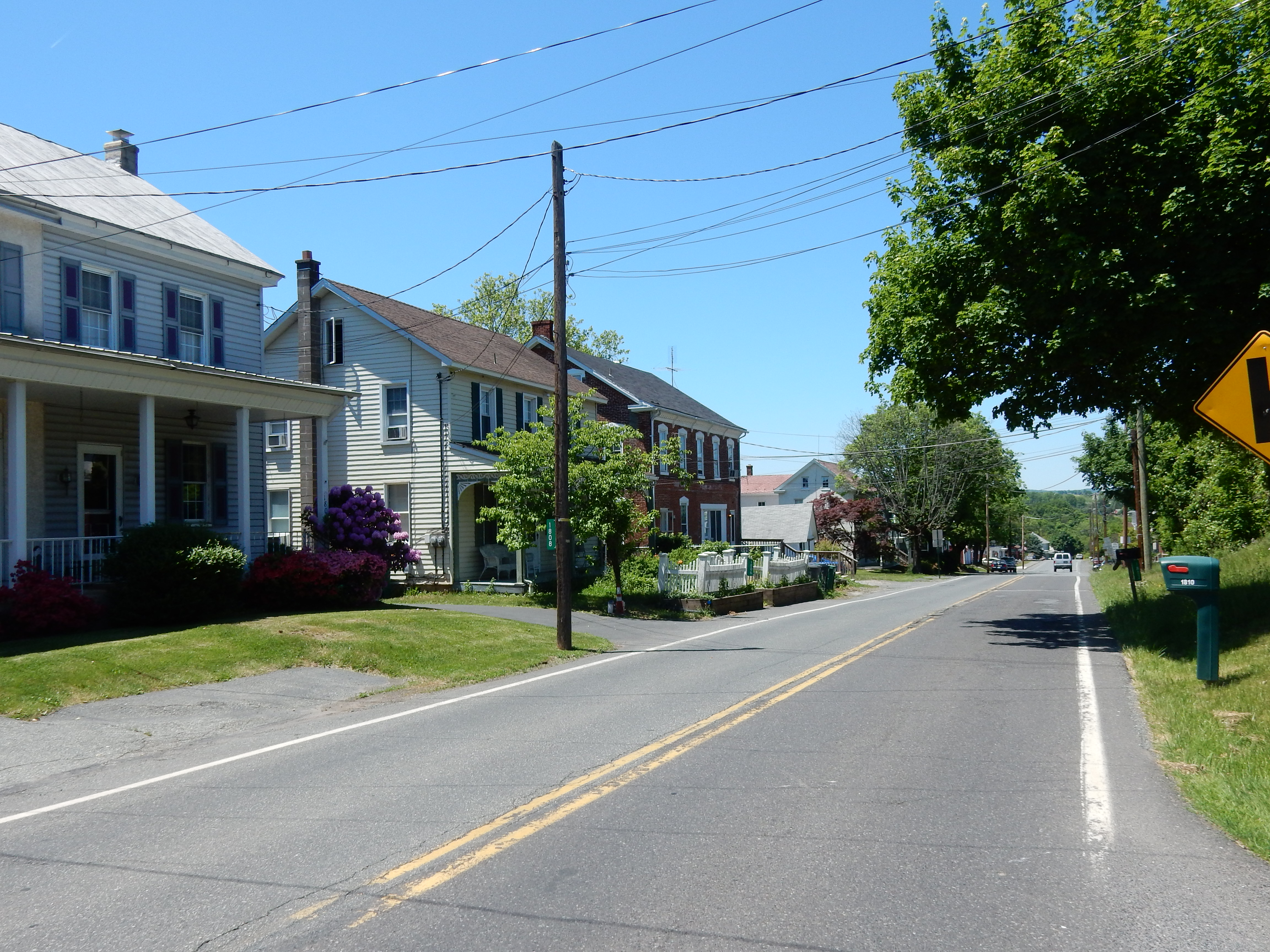
Hoffmansville Rd. in Sassamansville

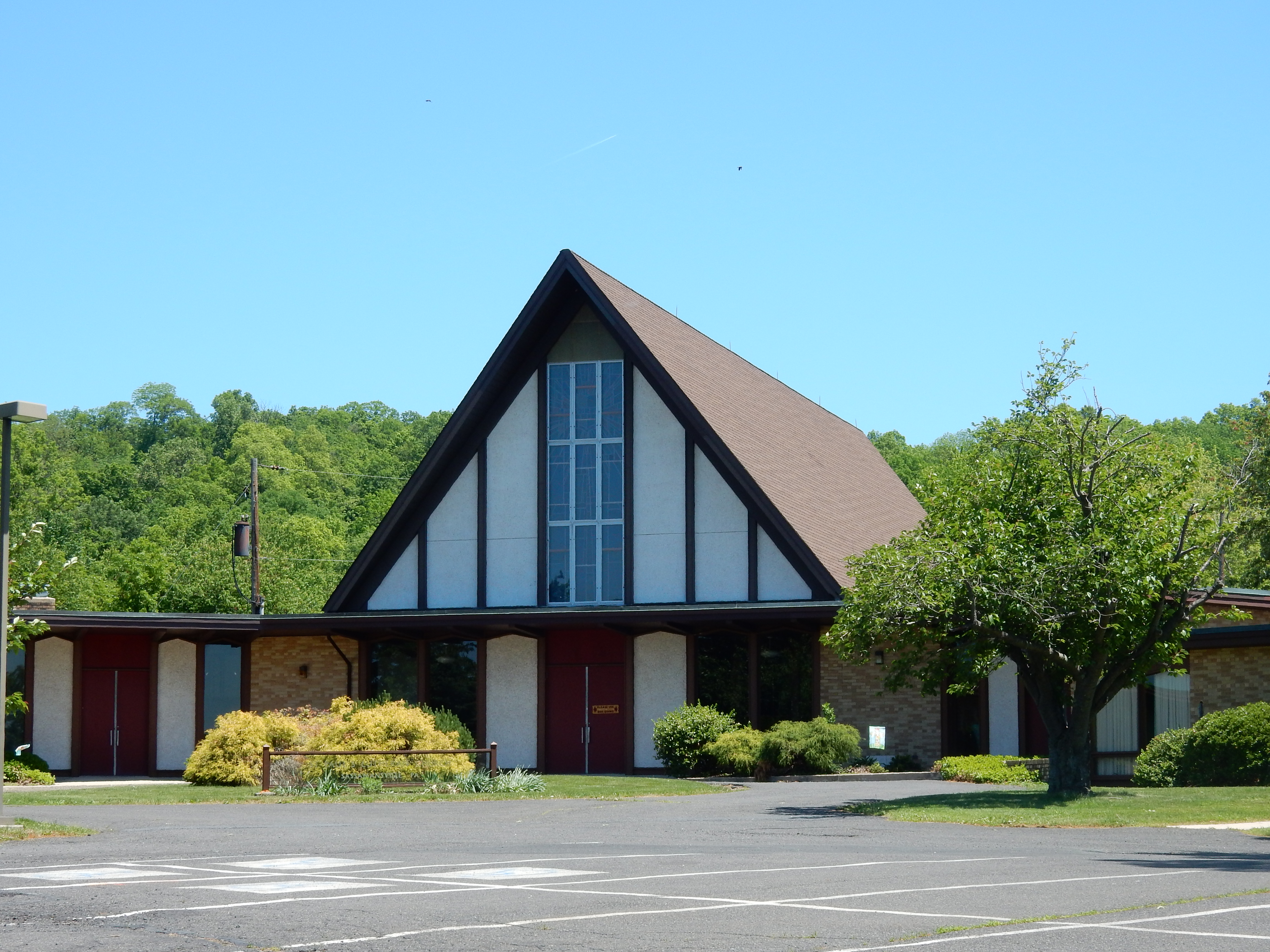
St. Paul's Lutheran Church
