= New Hanover Township =

New Hanover Township may refer to:

- New Hanover Township, New Jersey
- New Hanover Township, Pennsylvania
