= Layfield, Pennsylvania =

Unincorporated community in Pennsylvania, U.S.

Coordinates: 40°19′04″N 75°34′10″W

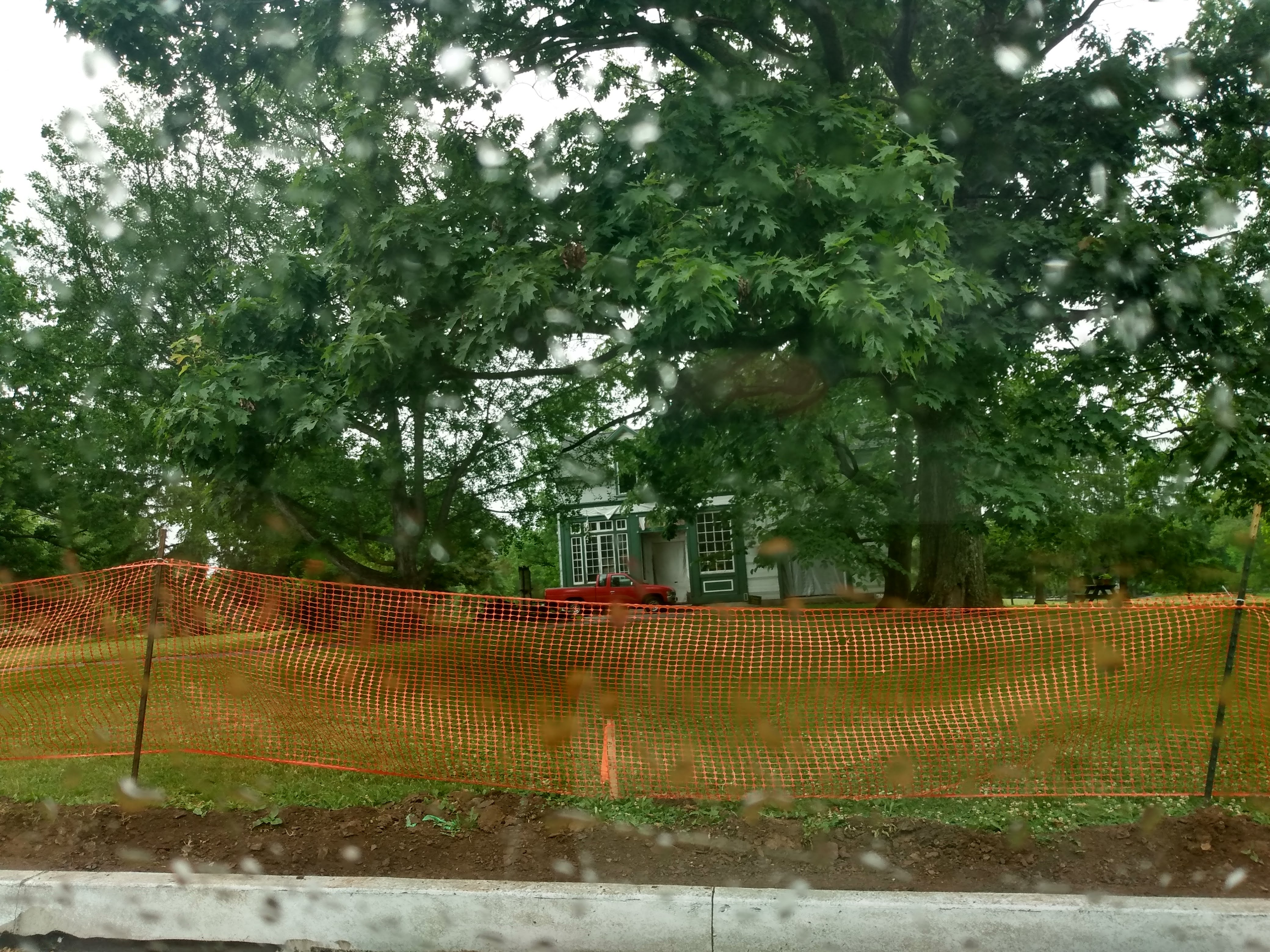
House in Layfield

Layfield is an unincorporated community in northwestern Montgomery County, Pennsylvania, on Route 73 and Route 663. It is located in New Hanover Township on the Swamp Creek, a tributary of the Perkiomen Creek. For a fraction of a mile 663 follows 73 (Big Road) in Layfield. 663 coming from Pennsburg is Layfield Road and coming from Pottstown is North Charlotte Street. Layfield is split between the Gilbertsville and Perkiomenville post offices, which use the zip codes of 19525 and 18074, respectively.
