= New Hanover Square, Pennsylvania =

Unincorporated community in Pennsylvania, U.S.

Coordinates: 40°18′38″N 75°32′19″W

New Hanover Square is an unincorporated community in northwestern Montgomery County, Pennsylvania, United States, situated on Route 73. It is located in New Hanover Township and the Scioto Creek, which forms its natural northeastern boundary, drains it into the Swamp Creek, a tributary of the Perkiomen Creek. Route 73 (Big Road) has a five-way intersection in New Hanover Square with Hoffmansville Road, New Hanover Square Road, and Renninger Road. The village is split among the Gilbertsville, Perkiomenville, and Zieglerville post offices, which use the ZIP codes of 19525, 18074, and 19492, respectively.
