= Spinnerstown, Pennsylvania =

Unincorporated community in Pennsylvania, US

Coordinates: 40°26′20″N 75°26′14″W

- Census-designated place
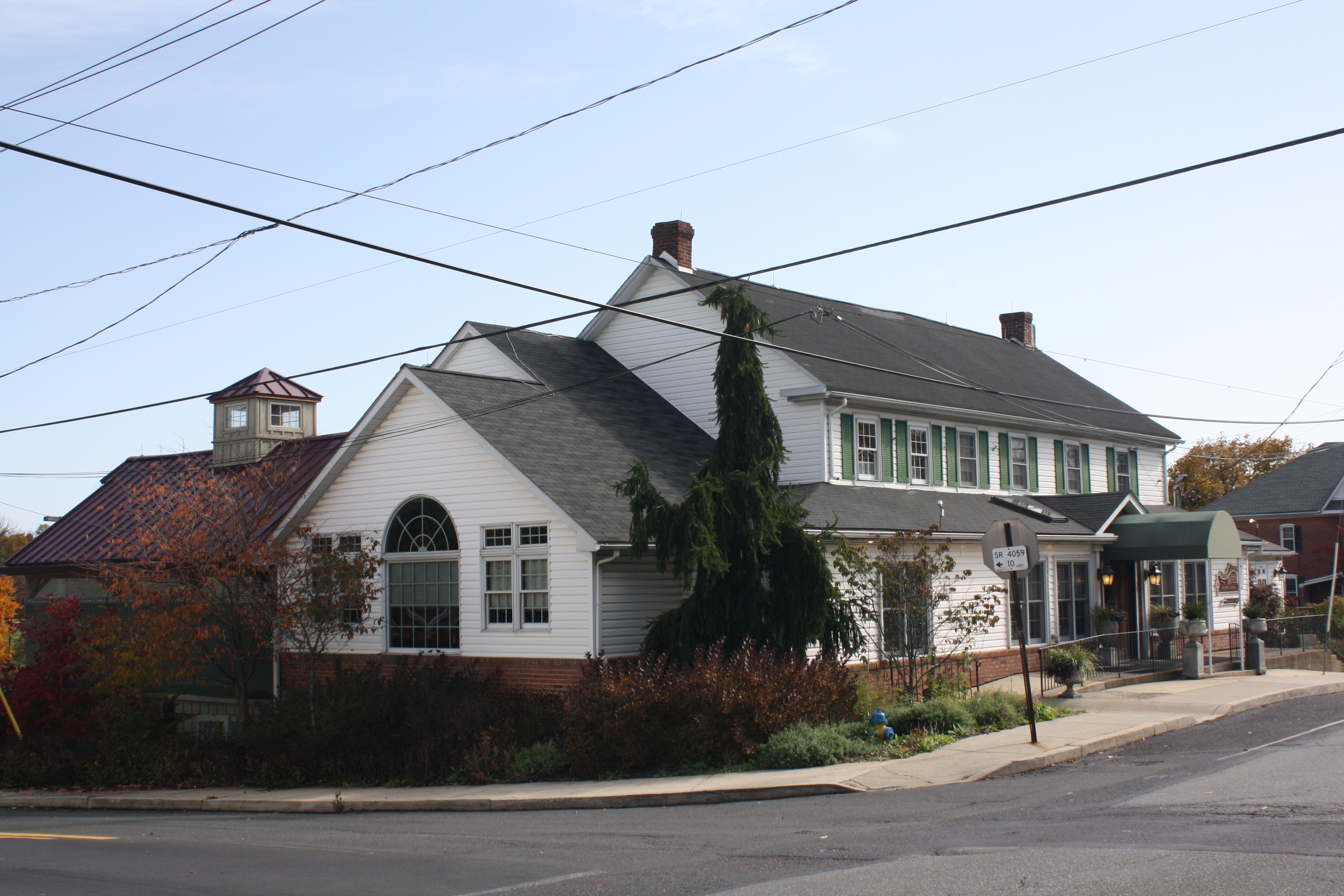
- Spinnerstown Hotel at the corner of Spinnerstown and Sleepy Hollow Rds.

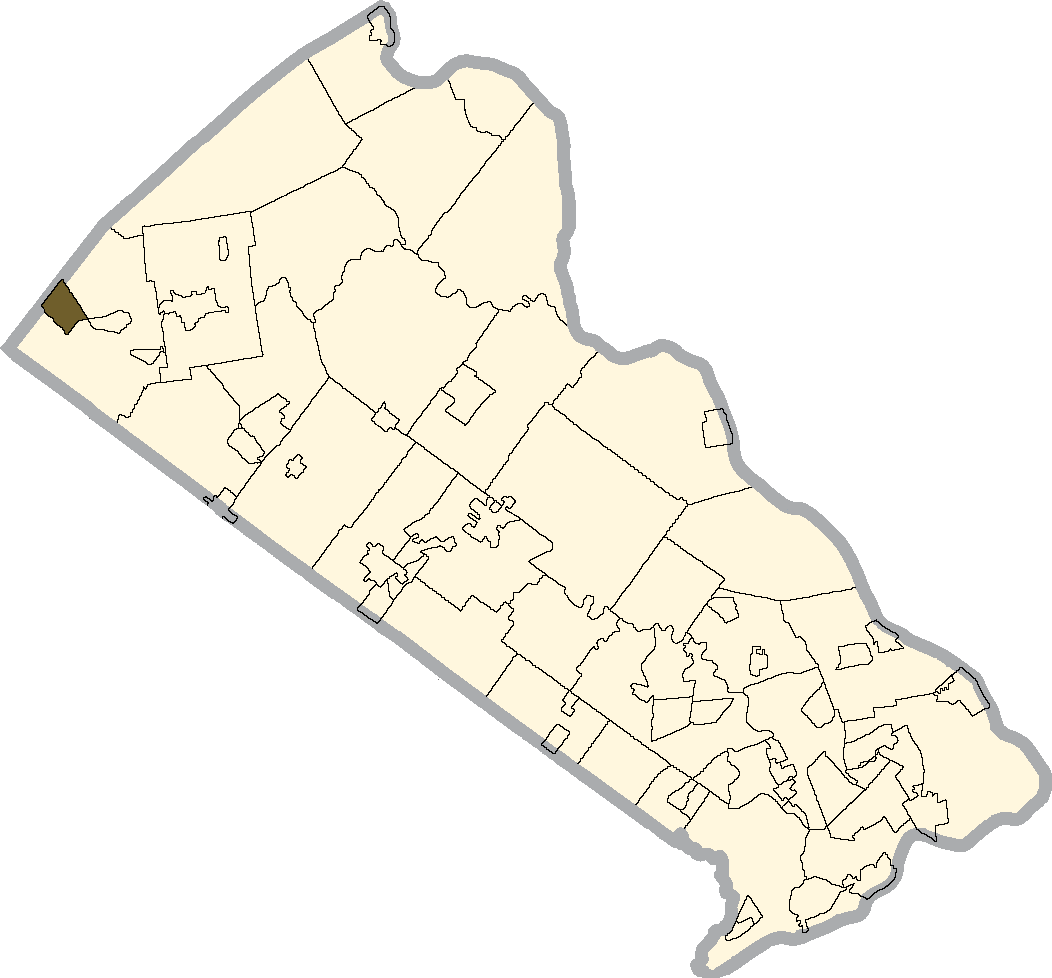
- Location of Spinnerstown in Bucks County, Pennsylvania
- Country: United States
- State: Pennsylvania
- County: Bucks
- Township: Milford

Population (2020)
  - Total: 1,671
- Time zone: UTC-5 (Eastern (EST))
  - Summer (DST): UTC-4 (EDT)
- ZIP Codes: 18968, 18951
- Area codes: 215, 267 and 445

Spinnerstown is a census-designated place in Milford Township, Bucks County, Pennsylvania, United States. It is located just northwest of the Quakertown interchange of I-476 with Route 663. As of the 2020 census, the population was 1,671 residents.

The community was named for the Spinner family, which settled in 1753. While the village has a PO Box post office with the zip code of 18968, the surrounding area uses the Quakertown zip code of 18951. It is located on the Molasses Creek, which drains via the Unami Creek into the Perkiomen Creek. Milford Township's government centre is located at 2100 Krammes Road, just southeast of the village.

The Spinner House was added to the National Register of Historic Places in 1978.

== Climate ==
Spinnerstown has a hot-summer humid continental climate (Dfa) and average monthly temperatures range from 28.8 °F in January to 73.2 °F in July. The local hardiness zone is 6b.

== Education ==
It is in the Quakertown Community School District.
