= The Bauman Family =

Pennsylvania based fruit butter producer

The Bauman Family is a fruit butter producer in the United States. The fruit butters are produced at a red brick factory in Sassamansville, Douglass Township, Pennsylvania. The business was established in 1892 by John Bauman. It also sells apple cider.

== Website ==
- The Bauman Family website
