= Spinner House =

Historic house in Pennsylvania, United States

- U.S. National Register of Historic Places
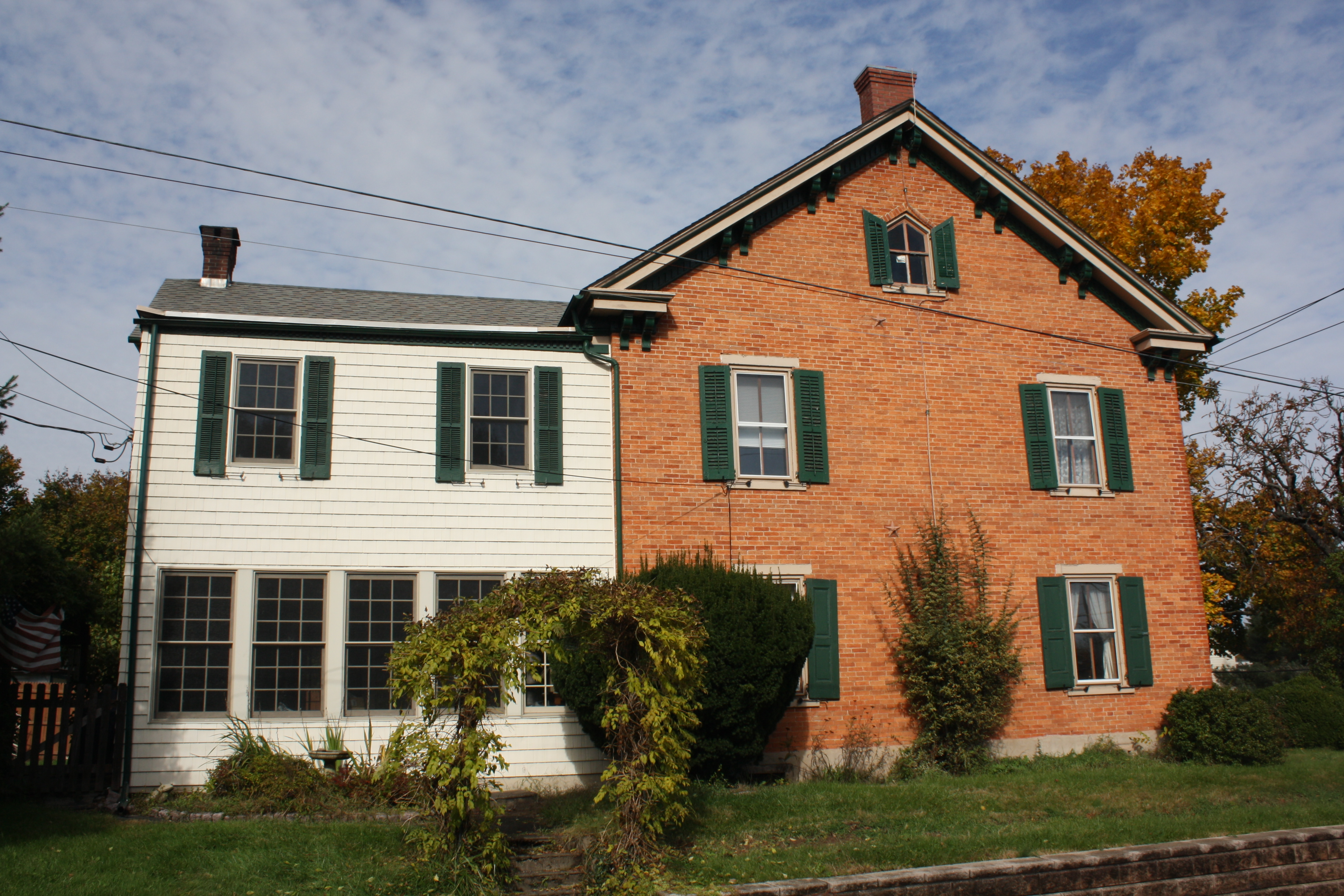
- Spinner House (view from Sleepy Hollow Rd.). October 2012.

- Location within Pennsylvania Location within the United States
- Location: Spinnerstown and Sleepy Hollow Rds., Spinnerstown, Pennsylvania
- Coordinates: 40°26′20″N 75°26′16″W
- Area: 0.5 acres (0.20 ha)
- Built: c. 1860
- Architectural style: Italianate
- NRHP reference No.: 79002175
- Added to NRHP: June 22, 1979

Spinner House is a historic home located at Spinnerstown, Bucks County, Pennsylvania. It was built about 1860, and is a 2 1/2-story, three bay by two bay, frame and brick dwelling with a gable roof and 2-story rear addition. Three sides of the house are covered in shiplap siding, and the fourth in brick. It is in the Italianate style. The interior features notable stencil work.

It was added to the National Register of Historic Places in 1978.

== Gallery ==
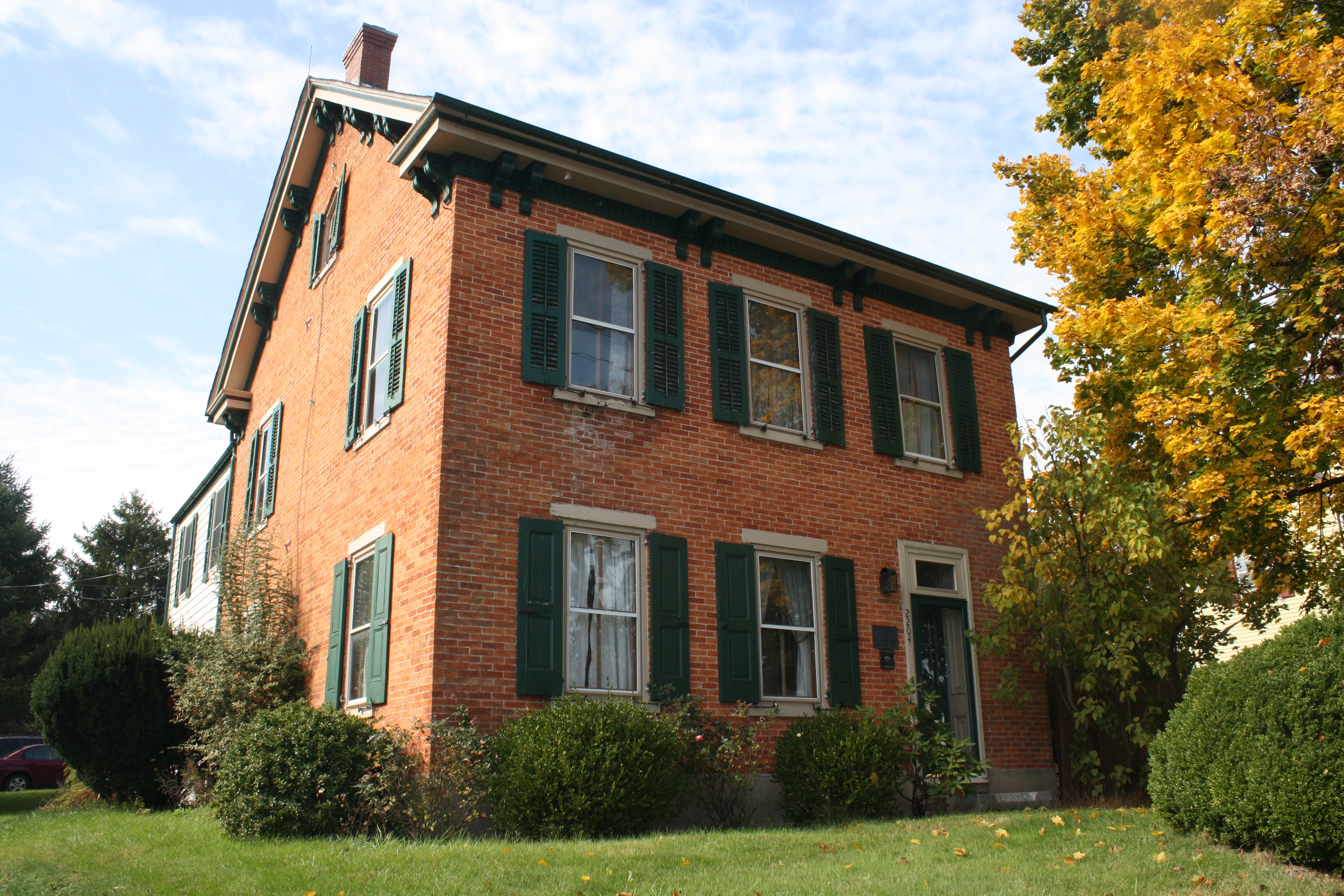
Spinner House.

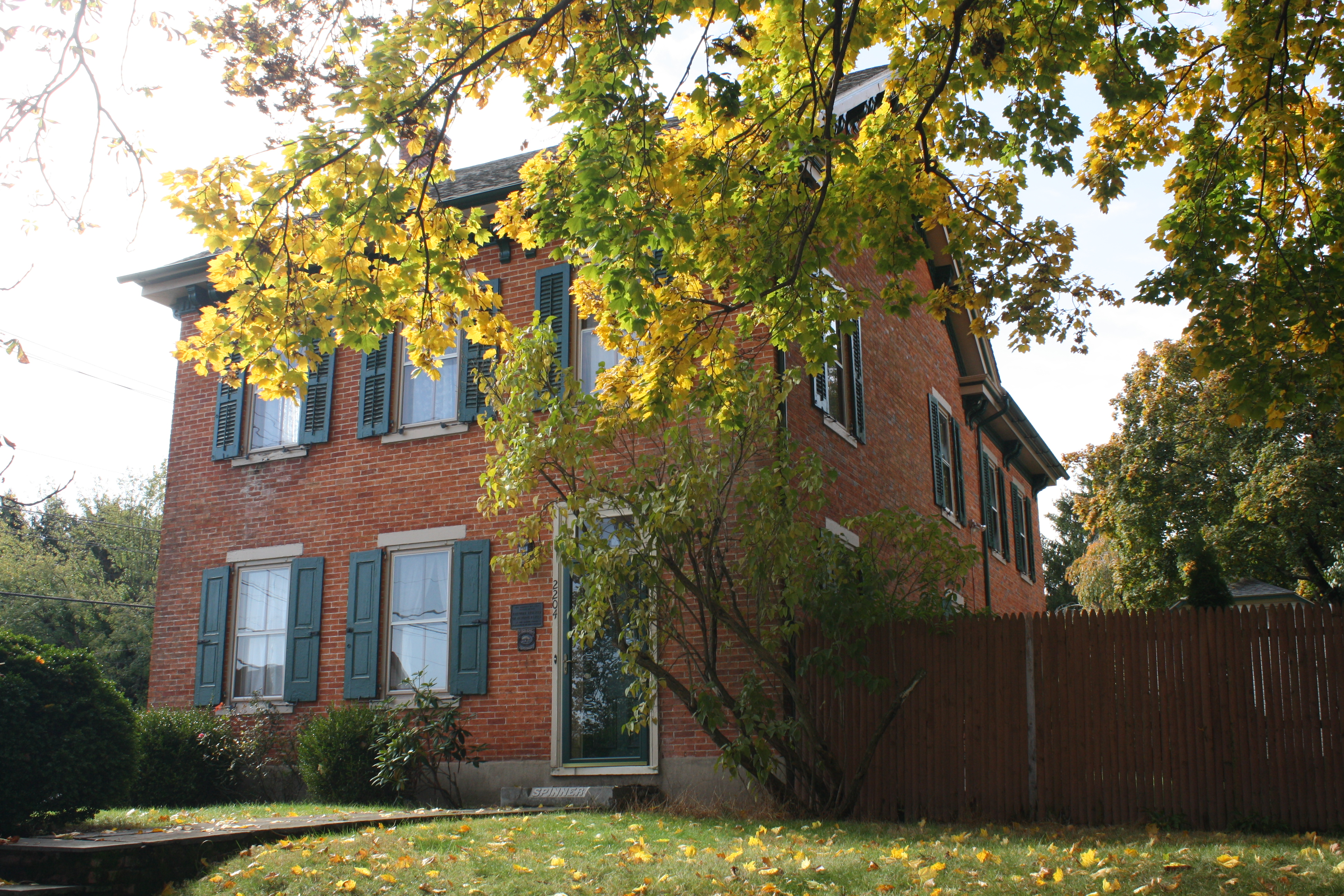
View from Spinnerstown Rd.

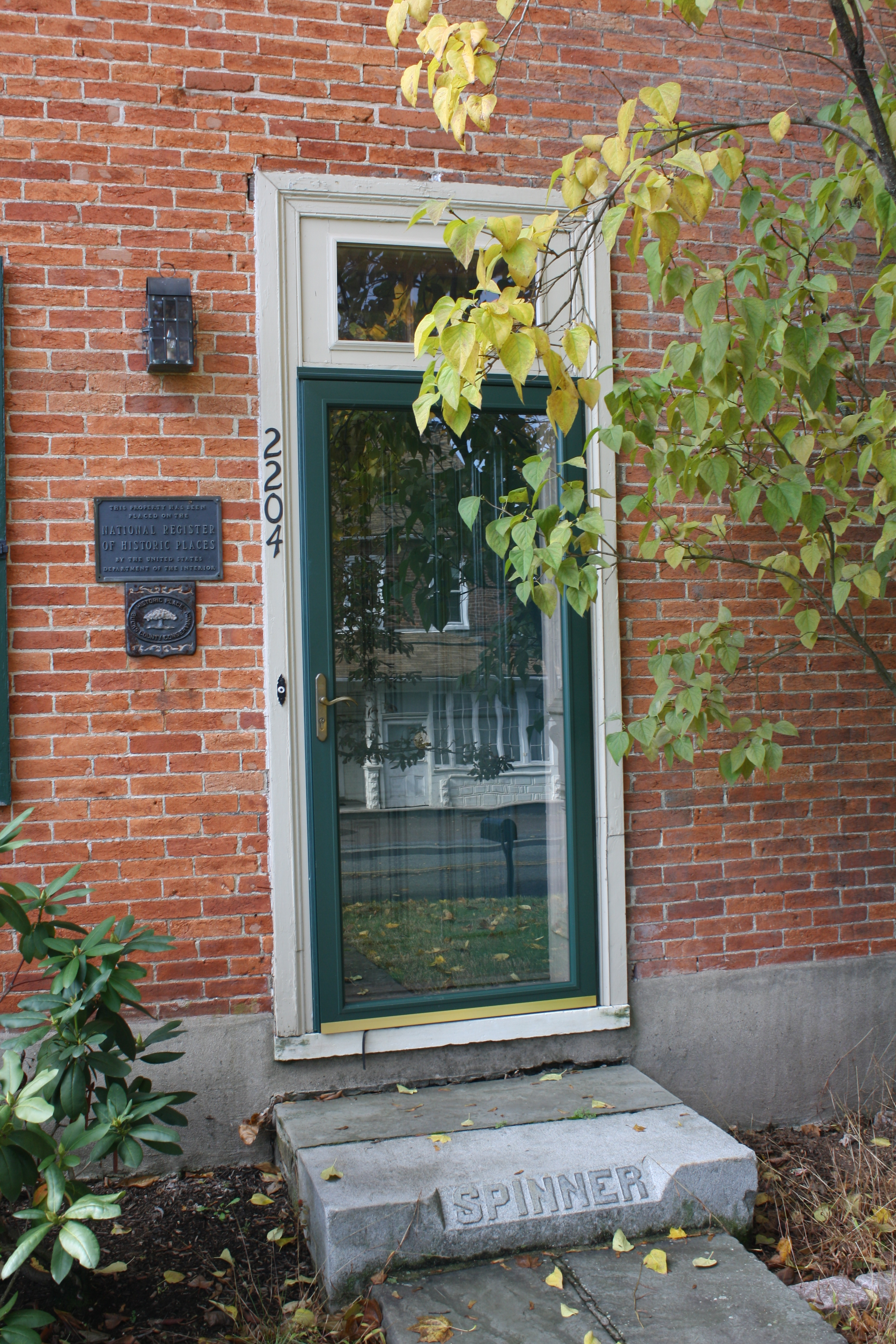
Spinner House. Front door.

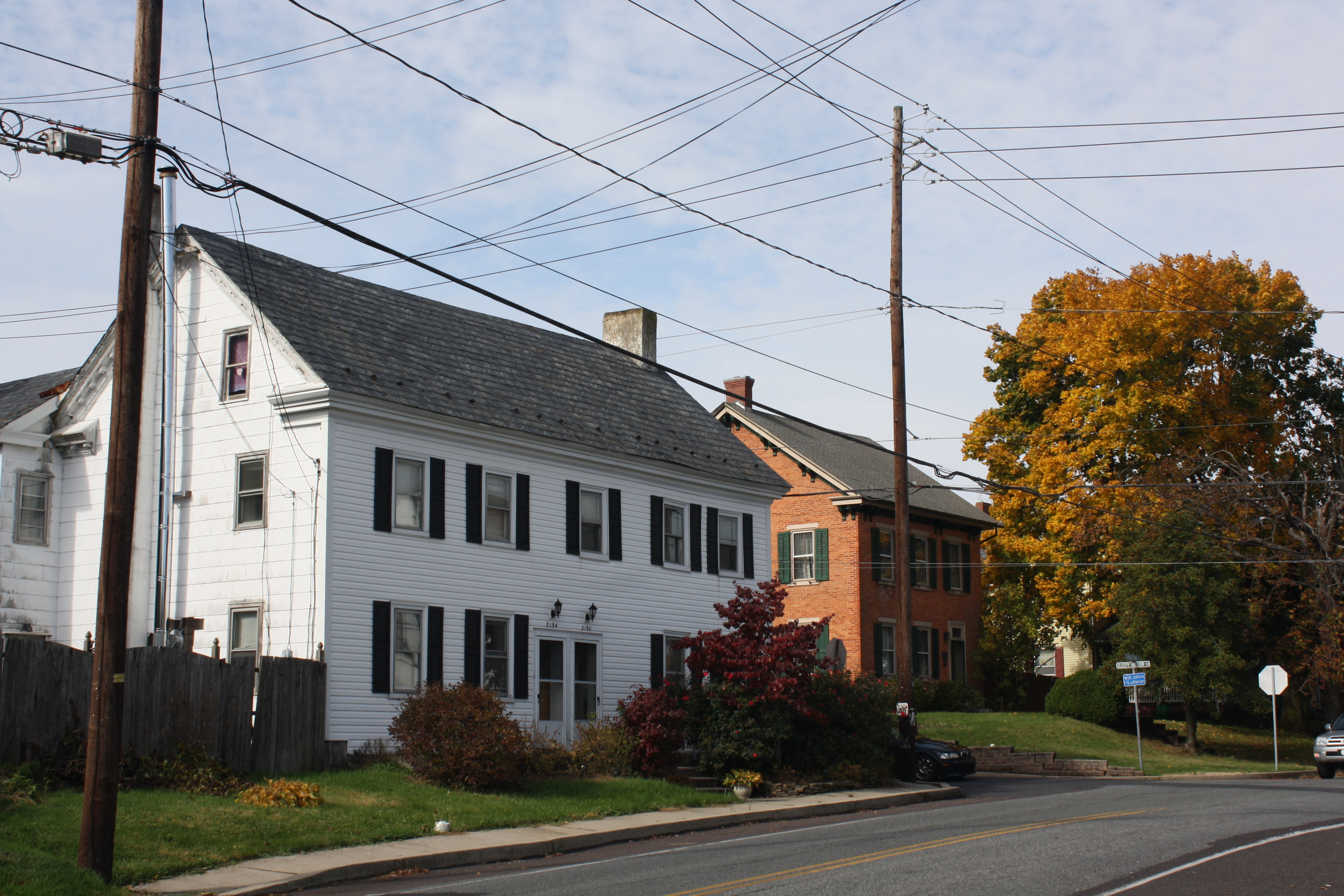
Spinnerstown Road.

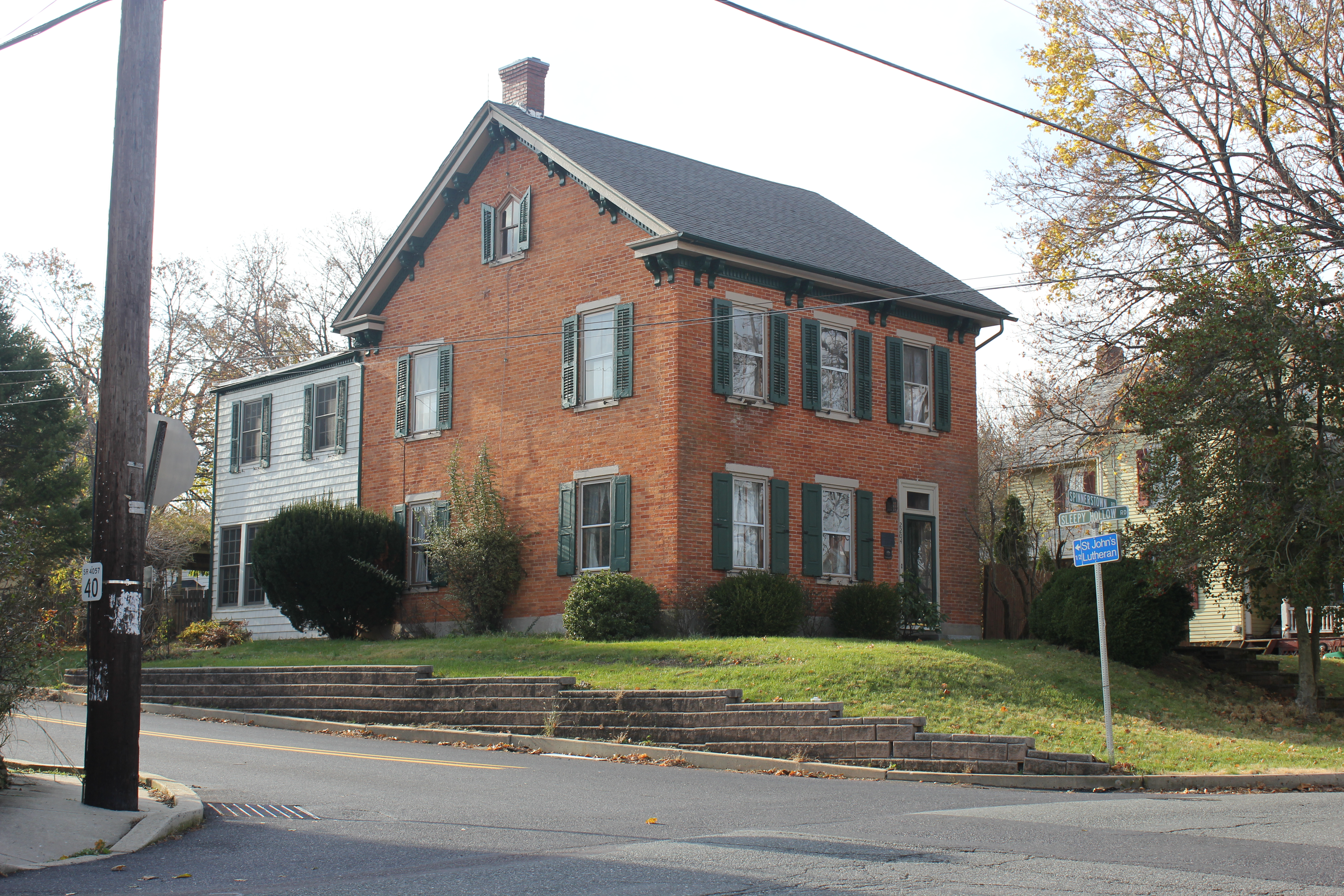
