= Pennsylvania Route 663 =

State highway in Pennsylvania, US

Pennsylvania Route 663
- Map of northern Montgomery County and western Bucks County with PA 663 highlighted in red

Route information
- Maintained by PennDOT
- Length: 22.134 mi (35.621 km)
- Existed: 1930–present

Major junctions
- South end: PA 100 in Pottstown
- PA 73 in New Hanover Township; PA 29 in Pennsburg; I-476 Toll / Penna Turnpike NE Extension near Quakertown
- North end: PA 309 / PA 313 in Quakertown

Location
- Country: United States
- State: Pennsylvania
- Counties: Montgomery, Bucks

Highway system
- Pennsylvania State Route System; Interstate; US; State; Scenic; Legislative
| ← PA 662 | → PA 664 |

Pennsylvania Route 663 (PA 663) is a 22.13-mile-long (35.61 km) state highway in Montgomery and Bucks counties in southeast Pennsylvania, United States. Its southern terminus is at PA 100 in the borough of Pottstown and its northern terminus is at PA 309 and PA 313 in the borough of Quakertown, where the road continues east as PA 313. Along the way, PA 663 also passes through the borough of Pennsburg. It is known as John Fries Highway between Pennsburg and Quakertown. It has an interchange with Interstate 476 (Pennsylvania Turnpike Northeast Extension) at exit 44 west of Quakertown. The route was assigned in 1930, and it has had several realignments since its commissioning, including two major ones.

== Route description ==
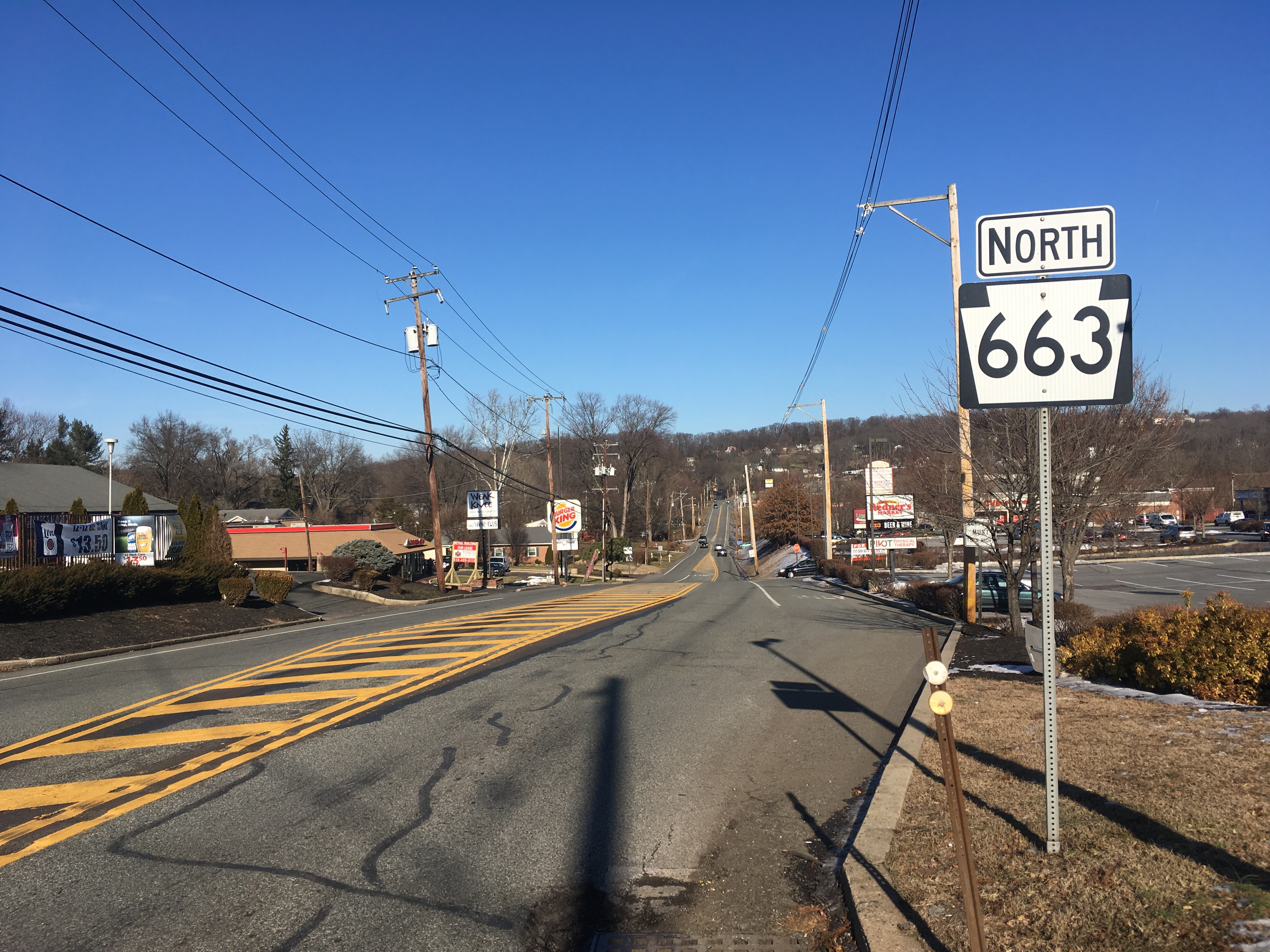
PA 663 northbound just north of Pottstown

PA 663 begins at an intersection with PA 100 in the borough of Pottstown in Montgomery County, heading east on four-lane undivided West King Street. The road passes between commercial areas to the north and the Pottsgrove Manor historic house museum to the south, crossing the Colebrookdale branch operated by the Colebrookdale Railroad at-grade and Manatawny Creek. The route becomes two-lane undivided King Street and is lined with residences. PA 663 turns north onto North Charlotte Street and continues past homes, curving to the northeast. The road crosses Mervine Street and becomes the border between Upper Pottsgrove Township to the northwest and Lower Pottsgrove Township to the southeast, running through a mix of residential and commercial areas. The route turns east to fully enter Lower Pottsgrove Township before it curves back to the northeast, again following the border between Upper Pottsgrove Township and Lower Pottsgrove Township past the Keim Street intersection. PA 663 continues through wooded areas with a few homes and enters New Hanover Township. The road runs through more rural areas with some development and comes to the Swamp Pike intersection in the community of New Hanover.

Farther northeast, PA 663 intersects PA 73 in the community of Layfield and turns east to form a concurrency with that route on Big Road. The road crosses Swamp Creek before PA 663 splits from PA 73 by heading northeast on Layfield Road. The route runs through farmland and woodland with some development, passing through the community of Hoffmansville. Farther northeast, the road heads into Upper Hanover Township and crosses the Green Lane Reservoir along the Perkiomen Creek. PA 663 heads into the borough of Pennsburg, where it becomes Pottstown Avenue and runs past homes and a few businesses, passing east of the terminus of an East Penn Railroad line. In the center of the borough, the route intersects PA 29. Past this intersection, the road name changes to Quakertown Avenue and it passes more development before leaving Pennsburg for Upper Hanover Township again. At this point, the route becomes John Fries Highway and heads through farm fields and woods.

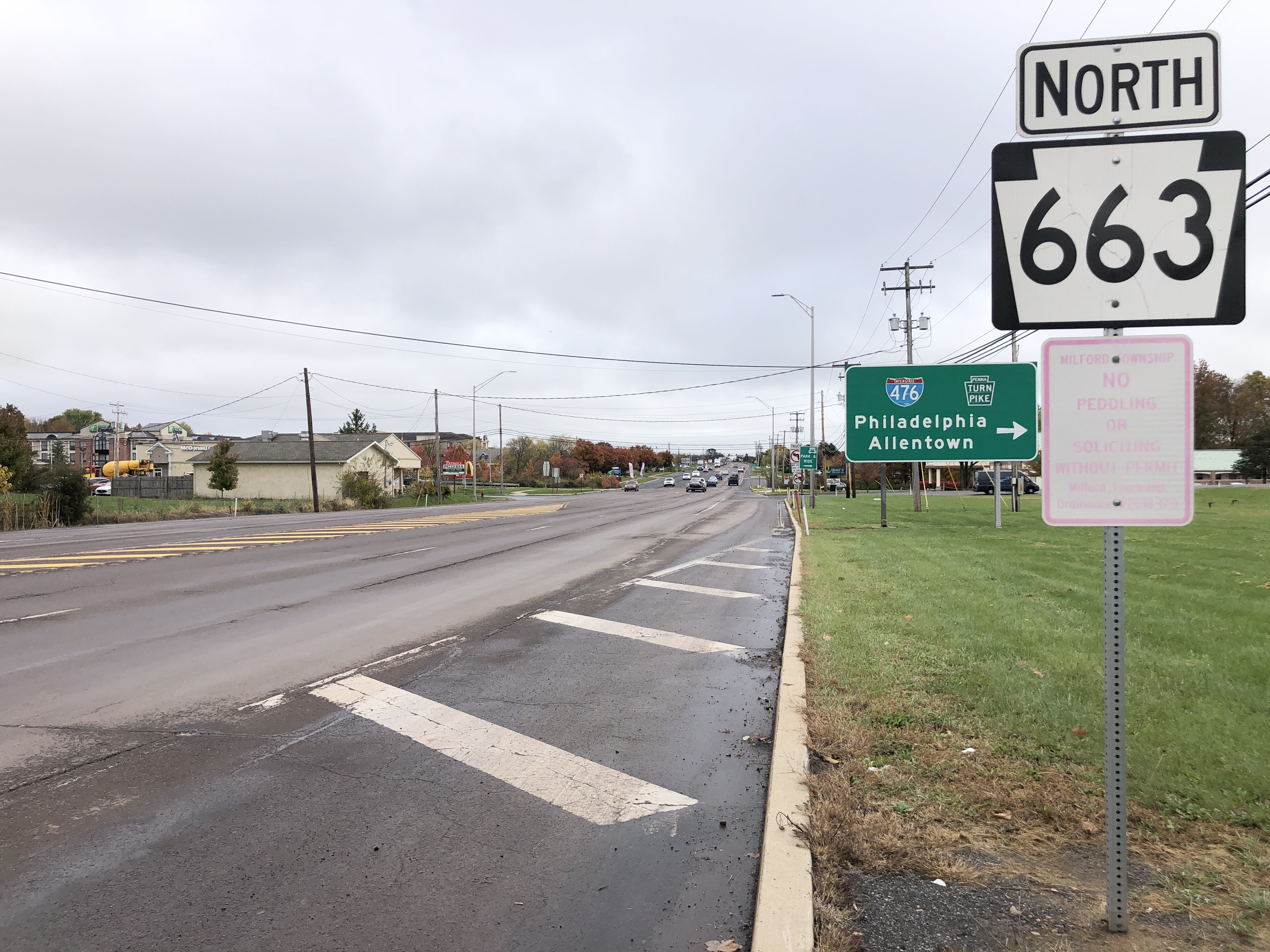
PA 663 northbound at the I-476 interchange in Milford Township

Past the Geryville Pike intersection, PA 663 enters Milford Township in Bucks County and continues through more rural areas. The road passes to the southeast of the community of Spinnerstown and widens into a four-lane divided highway at the Spinnerstown Road/Krammes Road intersection, where it curves to the east. The route becomes undivided and comes to the Quakertown interchange with I-476 (Pennsylvania Turnpike Northeast Extension). A park and ride lot is located south of the road at this interchange within the northbound reverse jughandle for the interchange ramp. PA 663 turns into a divided highway again and runs past businesses. The route becomes a two-lane undivided road again and continues back into rural areas, where it crosses Allentown Road and Unami Creek as it passes to the north of the community of Milford Square. The road runs near some development, heading south of St. Luke's Hospital–Upper Bucks Campus. The route enters Richland Township at the Portzer Road intersection and passes homes, becoming the border between Richland Township to the north and the borough of Quakertown to the south at the Milford Square Pike intersection, with the name changing to West Broad Street. PA 663 heads into commercial areas and fully enters Quakertown, where it widens back into a four-lane divided highway and comes to its northern terminus at an intersection with PA 309. Past this intersection, the road continues east as PA 313.

== History ==
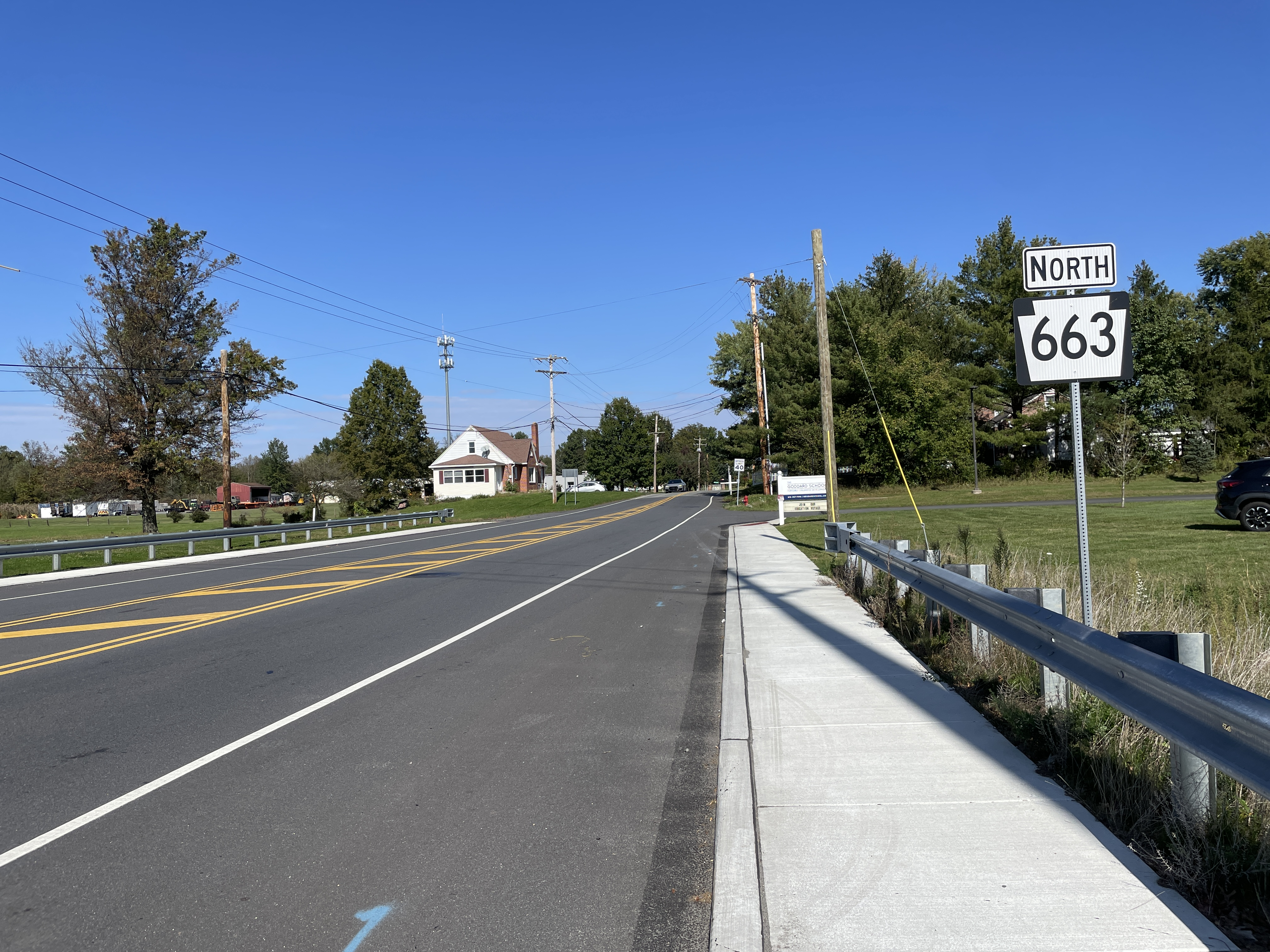
PA 663 northbound in New Hanover Township

PA 663 was once part of the Steinsburg and Milford Square Turnpike. The turnpike was chartered in March 1858. When Pennsylvania legislated routes in 1911, what is now PA 663 was not given a number. PA 663 was designated in 1930 to run from in U.S. Route 422 (US 422, High Street) in Pottstown north to PA 73 in New Hanover Township. At this time, the entire length of the route was paved, along with the unnumbered road between PA 73 and Quakertown. In 1936, PA 663 was extended north to an intersection with US 309 (now PA 309) and PA 212 (now PA 313) in Quakertown. The route followed its current alignment between PA 73 and Pennsburg before it followed Quakertown Road and Sleepy Hollow Road to Spinnerstown, where it turned east and followed Spinnerstown Road and Milford Square Pike to Quakertown. By 1967, the southern terminus of PA 663 was rerouted to PA 100 in Pottstown, heading west on King Street. In the 1960s, PA 663 was shifted from Milford Square Pike to a new alignment to the north between the Pennsylvania Turnpike Northeast Extension and Quakertown. After construction began in 1973, a new alignment of PA 663 to the south from Pennsburg to the Pennsylvania Turnpike Northeast Extension opened a year later, with the route moved off Quakertown Road, Sleepy Hollow Road, and Spinnerstown Road.

== Major intersections ==
| County | Location | mi | km | Destinations | Notes |
|---|---|---|---|---|---|
| Montgomery | Pottstown | 0.000 | 0.000 | PA 100 (Pottstown Pike) | Southern terminus |
| Montgomery | New Hanover Township | 7.037 | 11.325 | PA 73 west (Big Road) – Gilbertsville | Southern end of PA 73 concurrency |
| Montgomery | New Hanover Township | 7.273 | 11.705 | PA 73 east (Big Road) – Zieglerville | Northern end of PA 73 concurrency |
| Montgomery | Pennsburg | 13.936 | 22.428 | PA 29 (Main Street) – East Greenville, Red Hill | |
| Bucks | Milford Township | 18.760 | 30.191 | I-476 Toll / Penna Turnpike NE Extension – Philadelphia, Allentown | Exit 44 (Quakertown) on I-476 / Penna Turnpike NE Extension |
| Bucks | Quakertown | 22.134 | 35.621 | PA 309 (West End Boulevard) / PA 313 east (West Broad Street) – Allentown, Sellersville, Quakertown | Northern terminus; western terminus of PA 313 |
1.000 mi = 1.609 km; 1.000 km = 0.621 mi: Concurrency terminus; Electronic toll collection

== PA 663 Alternate Truck ==
=== Pottstown ===
PA Route 663 Alternate Truck
- Location: Pottstown, Pennsylvania
- Length: 2.6 mi (4.2 km)
- Existed: 2013–present

Pennsylvania Route 663 Alternate Truck is a truck route around a weight-restricted bridge over the Manatawny Creek in Pottstown, on which trucks over 15 tons are prohibited. It follows PA 100, North State Street, and Manatawny Street and was signed in 2013. In October 2020, work began to replace the bridge, and traffic was diverted along local streets. Construction is expected to be completed in Spring 2022.

=== Upper Hanover Township ===
PA Route 663 Alternate Truck
- Location: Upper Hanover Township, Pennsylvania
- Length: 14.8 mi (23.8 km)
- Existed: 2013–2018

Pennsylvania Route 663 Alternate Truck was a truck route around a weight-restricted bridge over a branch of the Perkiomen Creek in Upper Hanover Township, on which trucks over 36 tons and combination loads over 40 tons are prohibited. It followed PA 73, PA 100, and Kutztown Road; it was signed in 2013 but decommissioned in 2018 following a bridge repair.
