= Long Meadow Farm (Schwenksville, Pennsylvania) =

- U.S. National Register of Historic Places
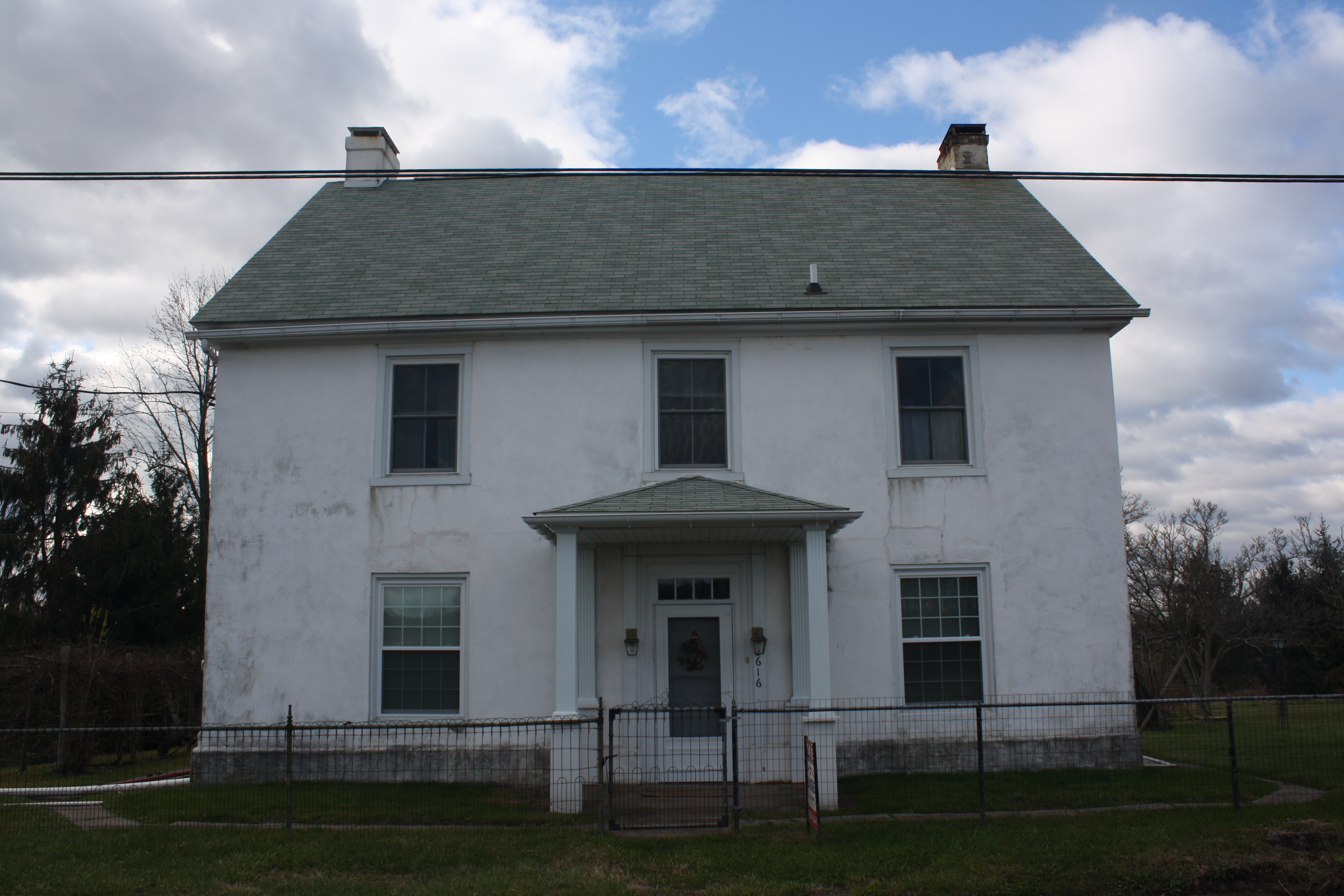
- Long Meadow Farmhouse. November 2012.

- Location within Pennsylvania Location within the United States
- Location: Northwest of Schwenksville on Pennsylvania Route 73, New Hanover Township, Pennsylvania
- Coordinates: 40°18′34.3″N 75°32′16.4″W
- Area: 13 acres (5.3 ha)
- Architectural style: Georgian, Germanic style
- NRHP reference No.: 73001652
- Added to NRHP: June 19, 1973

The Long Meadow Farm, also known as the Plank House and Barn, is an historic home and barn complex that is located in New Hanover Township, Montgomery County, Pennsylvania, United States.

It was added to the National Register of Historic Places in 1973.

== History and architectural features ==
The house is a 2 1/2-story, stuccoed brick, Germanic-style residence with a 2 1/2-story addition. The interior has Georgian-style details. The barn dates to the mid-nineteenth century.

== Gallery ==
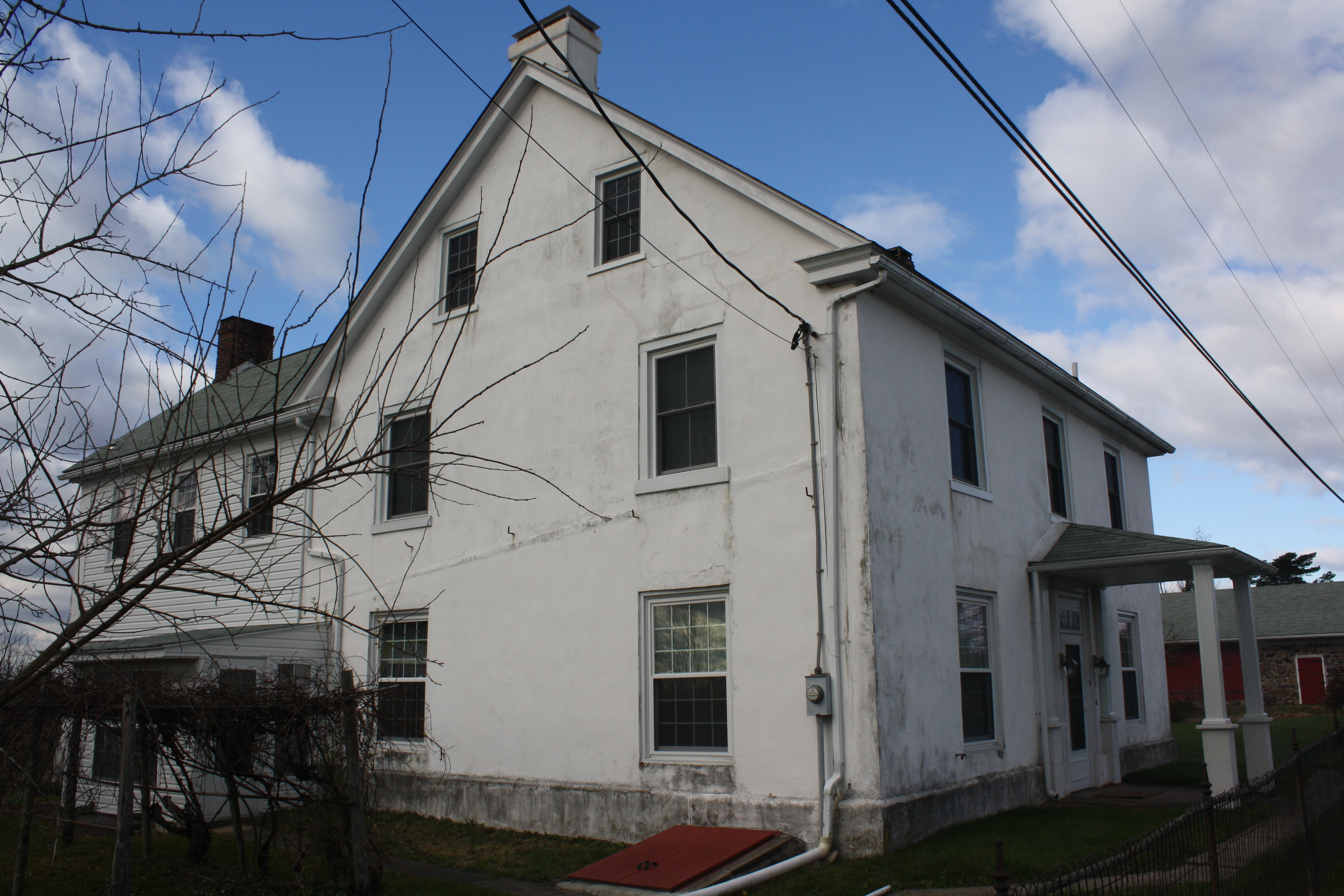
Farm House.

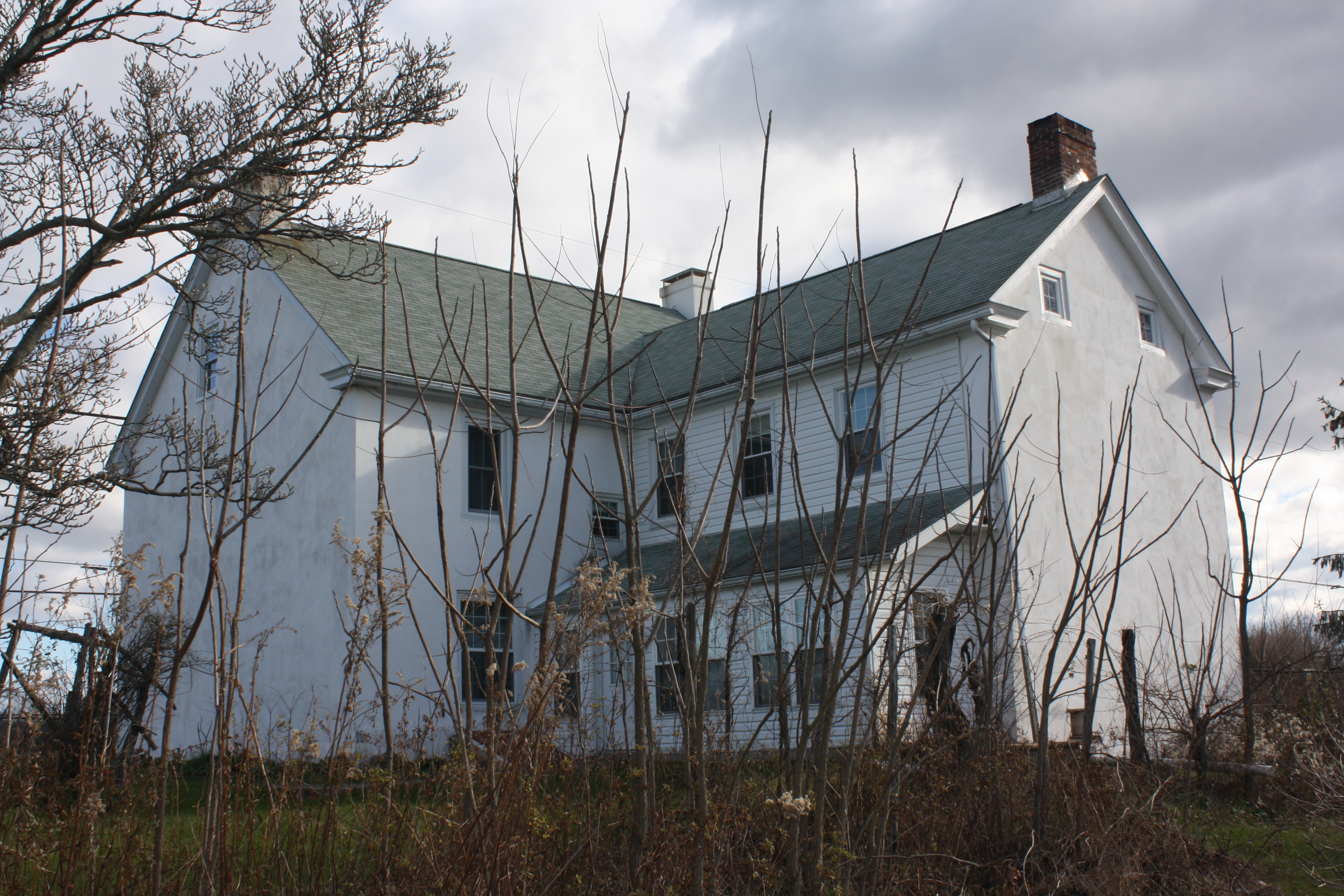
Farm House, rear view.

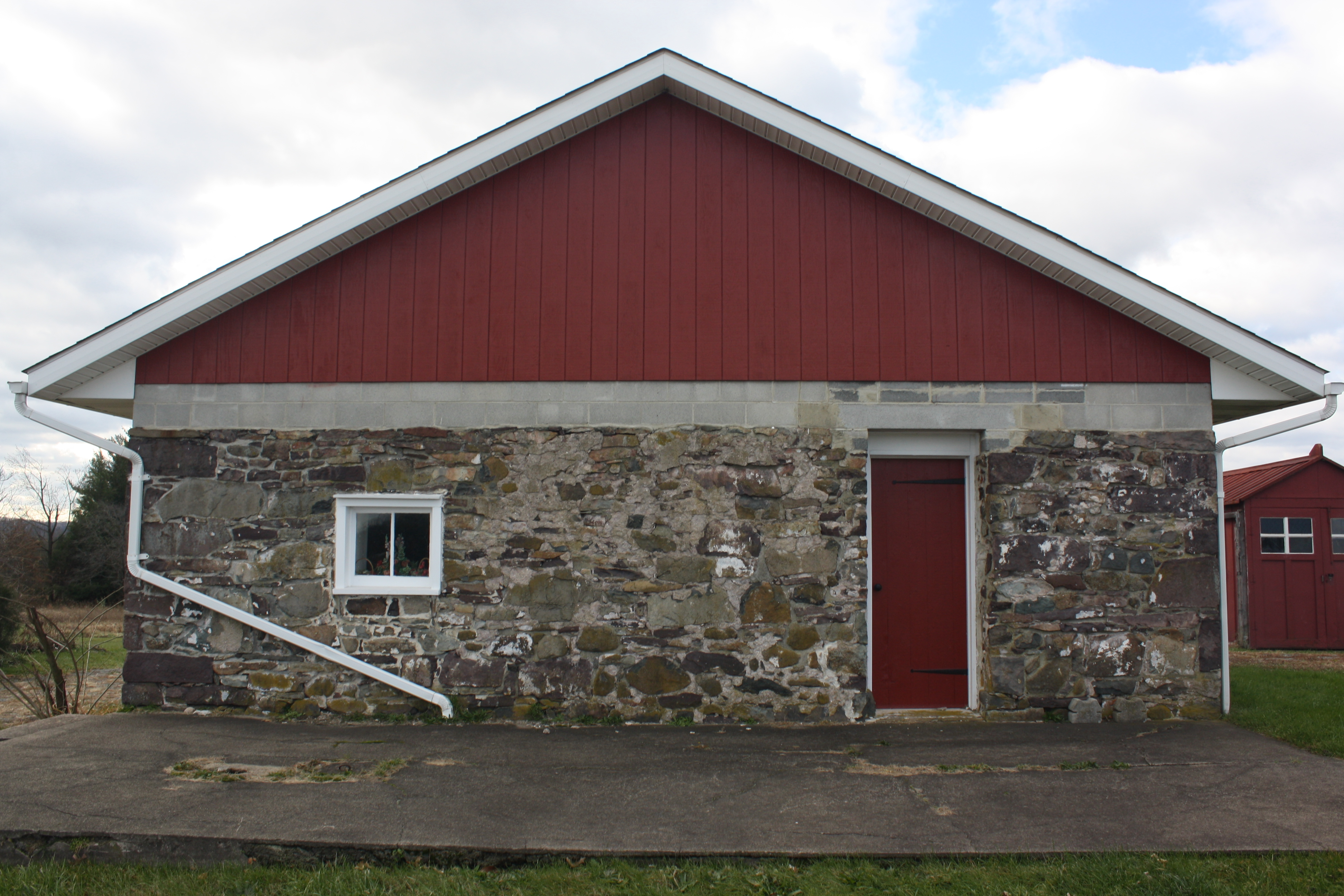
Barn, front view.

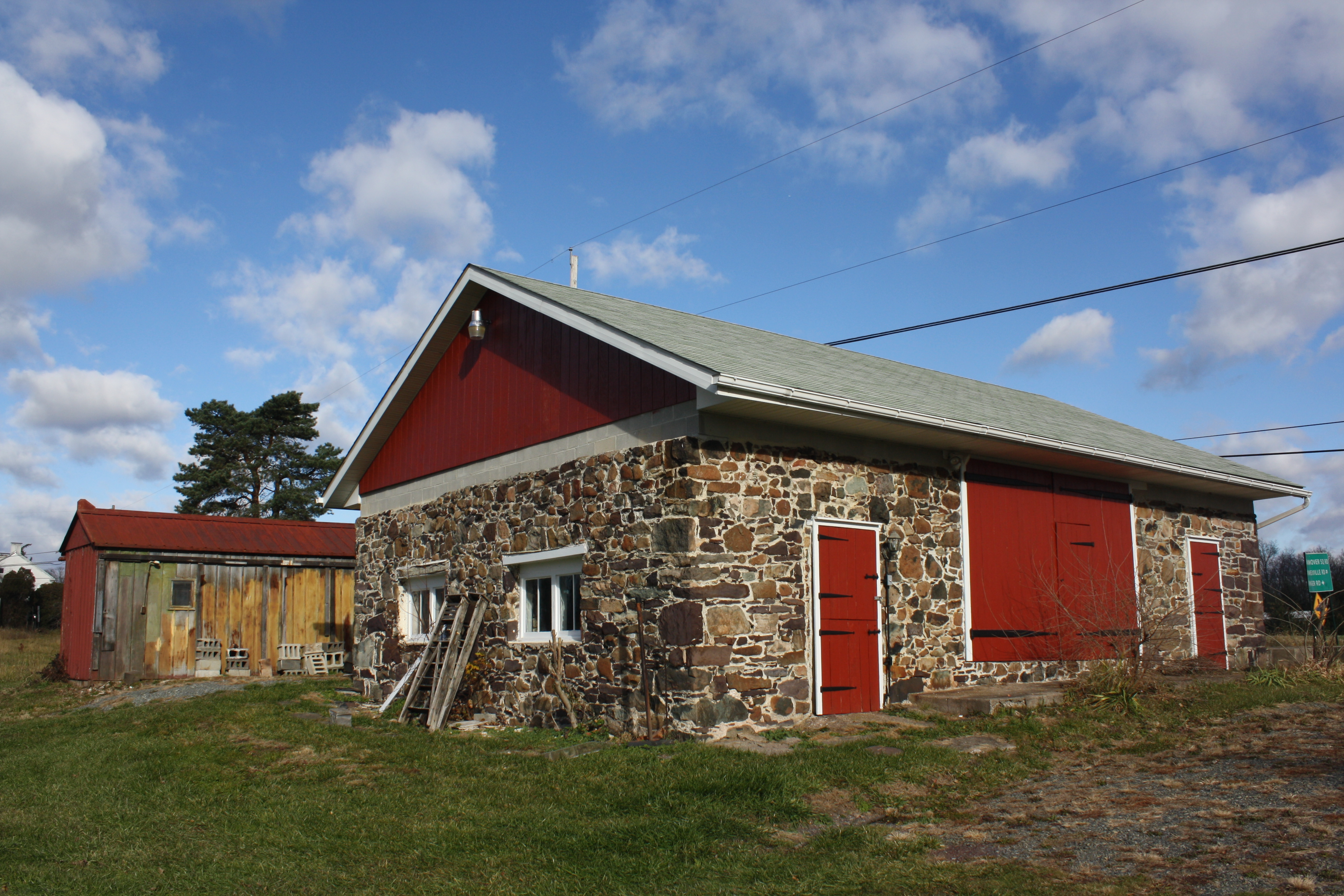
Barn, rear view.

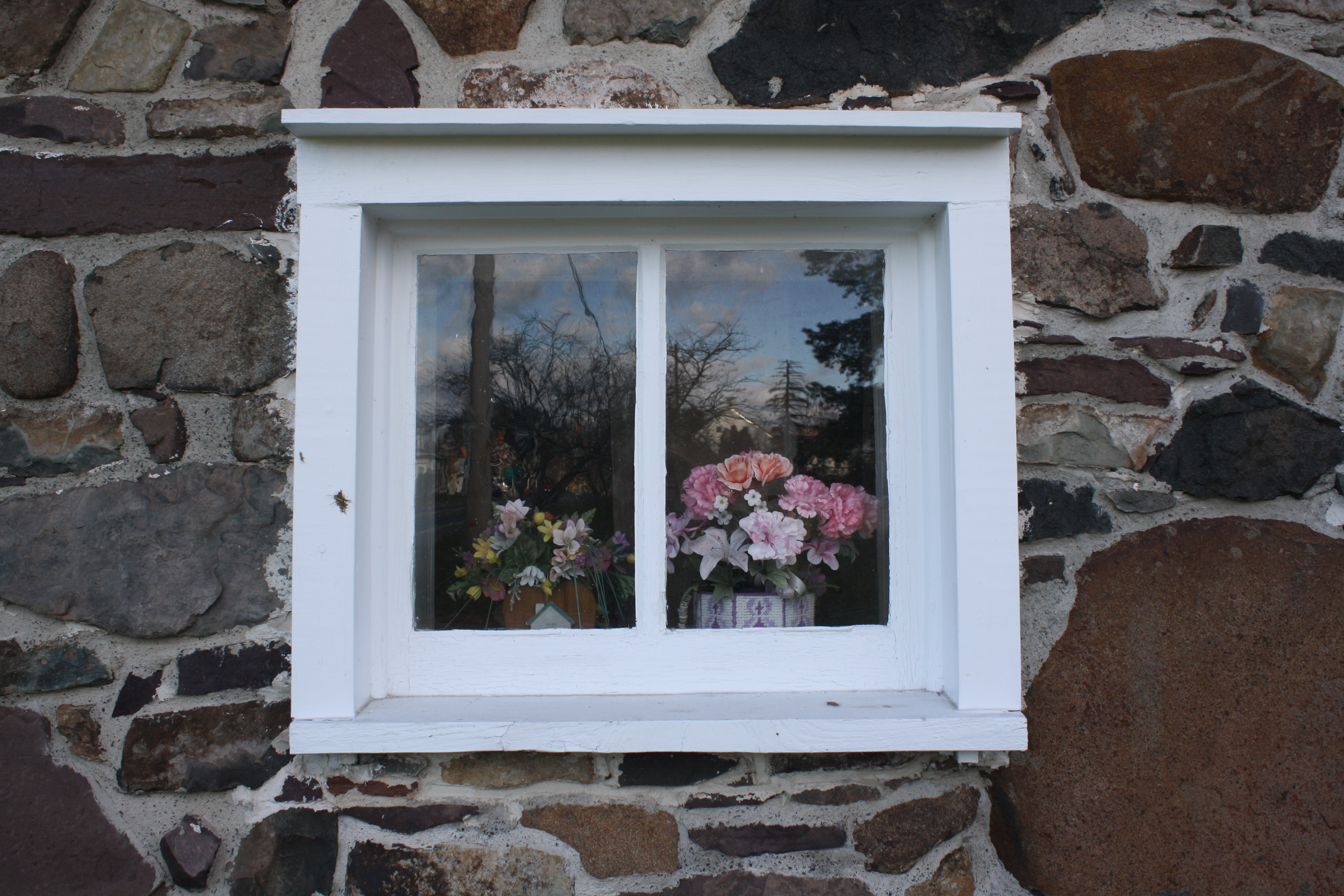
Barn window.
