= New Hanover Township, Pennsylvania =

Township in Pennsylvania, US

New Hanover Township
- Township
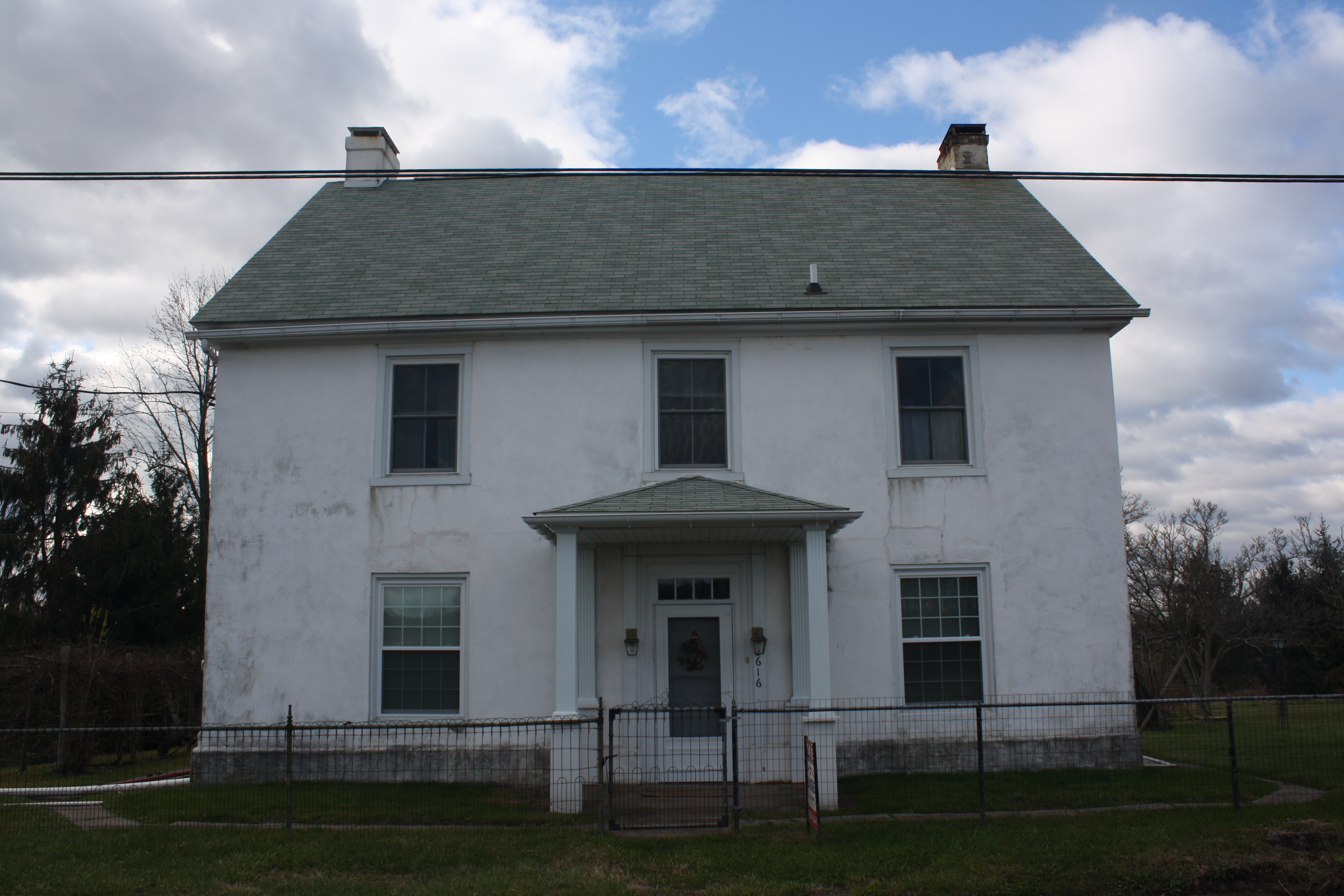
- Long Meadow Farmhouse, a historic site in the township

- Seal

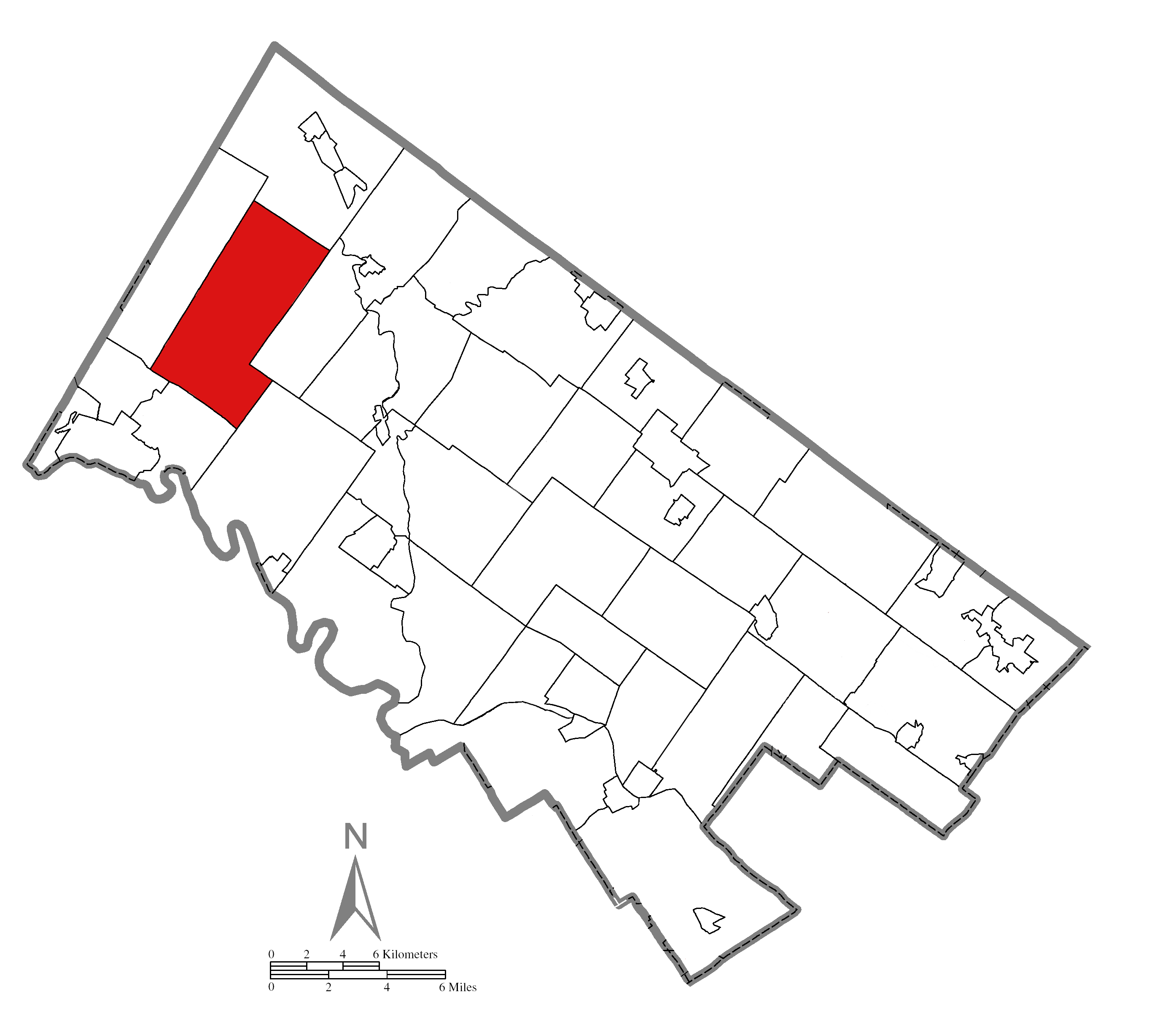
- Location of New Hanover Township in Montgomery County

- Location of PA in the United States
- Coordinates: 40°19′31″N 75°32′53″W
- Country: United States
- State: Pennsylvania
- County: Montgomery
- Established: 1741

Area
  - Total: 21.68 sq mi (56.2 km^{2})
  - Land: 21.68 sq mi (56.2 km^{2})
  - Water: 0.00 sq mi (0 km^{2})
- Elevation: 427 ft (130 m)

Population (2010)
  - Total: 10,939
  - Estimate (2016): 12,776
  - Density: 504.6/sq mi (194.8/km^{2})
- Time zone: UTC-5 (EST)
  - Summer (DST): UTC-4 (EDT)
- Area codes: 610, 484 and 215, 267 and 445
- Website: www.newhanoverpa.gov

New Hanover Township is a township in Montgomery County, Pennsylvania, United States. The population was 10,939 at the 2010 census.

== History ==
New Hanover Township is a portion of the original Hanover Township.

== Geography ==
According to the United States Census Bureau, the township has a total area of 21.6 square miles (55.9 km^{2}), all land. It consists mainly of rolling hills and valleys and is drained by the Schuylkill River mostly via the Perkiomen Creek. Its villages include Fagleysville, Frederick (also in Upper Frederick Township,) Hoffmansville, Layfield, New Hanover, New Hanover Square, Sassamansville (also in Douglass Township), and Gilbertsville (also in Douglass Township).

New Hanover has a hot-summer humid continental climate (Dfa) and is in hardiness zones 6b and 7a. The average monthly temperatures in Layfield range from 30.6 °F in January to 75.3 °F in July. The average annual absolute minimum temperature in Layfield is 0.6 °F.

=== Adjacent municipalities ===
- Upper Hanover Township (northeast)
- Upper Frederick Township (east)
- Limerick Township (southeast)
- Lower Pottsgrove Township (south)
- Upper Pottsgrove Township (southwest)
- Douglass Township (northwest)

== Demographics ==
Historical population
Census	Pop.	Note	%±
1930	1,467		—
1940	1,476		0.6%
1950	1,745		18.2%
1960	3,218		84.4%
1970	4,211		30.9%
1980	4,623		9.8%
1990	5,956		28.8%
2000	7,369		23.7%
2010	10,939		48.4%
2020	12,973		18.6%

As of the 2010 census, the township was 95.3% White, 1.2% Black or African American, 0.1% Native American, 2.0% Asian, and 1.2% were two or more races. 1.6% of the population were of Hispanic or Latino ancestry.

As of the census of 2000, there were 7,369 people, 2,532 households, and 2,147 families residing in the township. The population density was 341.3 inhabitants per square mile (131.8/km^{2}). There were 2,615 housing units at an average density of 121.1 per square mile (46.8/km^{2}). The racial makeup of the township was 98.32% White, 0.31% African American, 0.07% Native American, 0.79% Asian, 0.01% Pacific Islander, 0.05% from other races, and 0.45% from two or more races. Hispanic or Latino of any race were 0.76% of the population.

There were 2,532 households, out of which 40.1% had children under the age of 18 living with them, 76.5% were married couples living together, 5.4% had a female householder with no husband present, and 15.2% were non-families. 12.2% of all households were made up of individuals, and 5.1% had someone living alone who was 65 years of age or older. The average household size was 2.91 and the average family size was 3.17.

In the township the population was spread out, with 27.5% under the age of 18, 5.3% from 18 to 24, 31.5% from 25 to 44, 24.9% from 45 to 64, and 10.8% who were 65 years of age or older. The median age was 38 years. For every 100 females there were 100.2 males. For every 100 females age 18 and over, there were 97.7 males.

The median income for a household in the township was $67,097, and the median income for a family was $70,789. Males had a median income of $51,420 versus $33,578 for females. The per capita income for the township was $25,084. About 1.3% of families and 3.3% of the population were below the poverty line, including 4.7% of those under age 18 and 1.4% of those age 65 or over.

== Government and politics ==
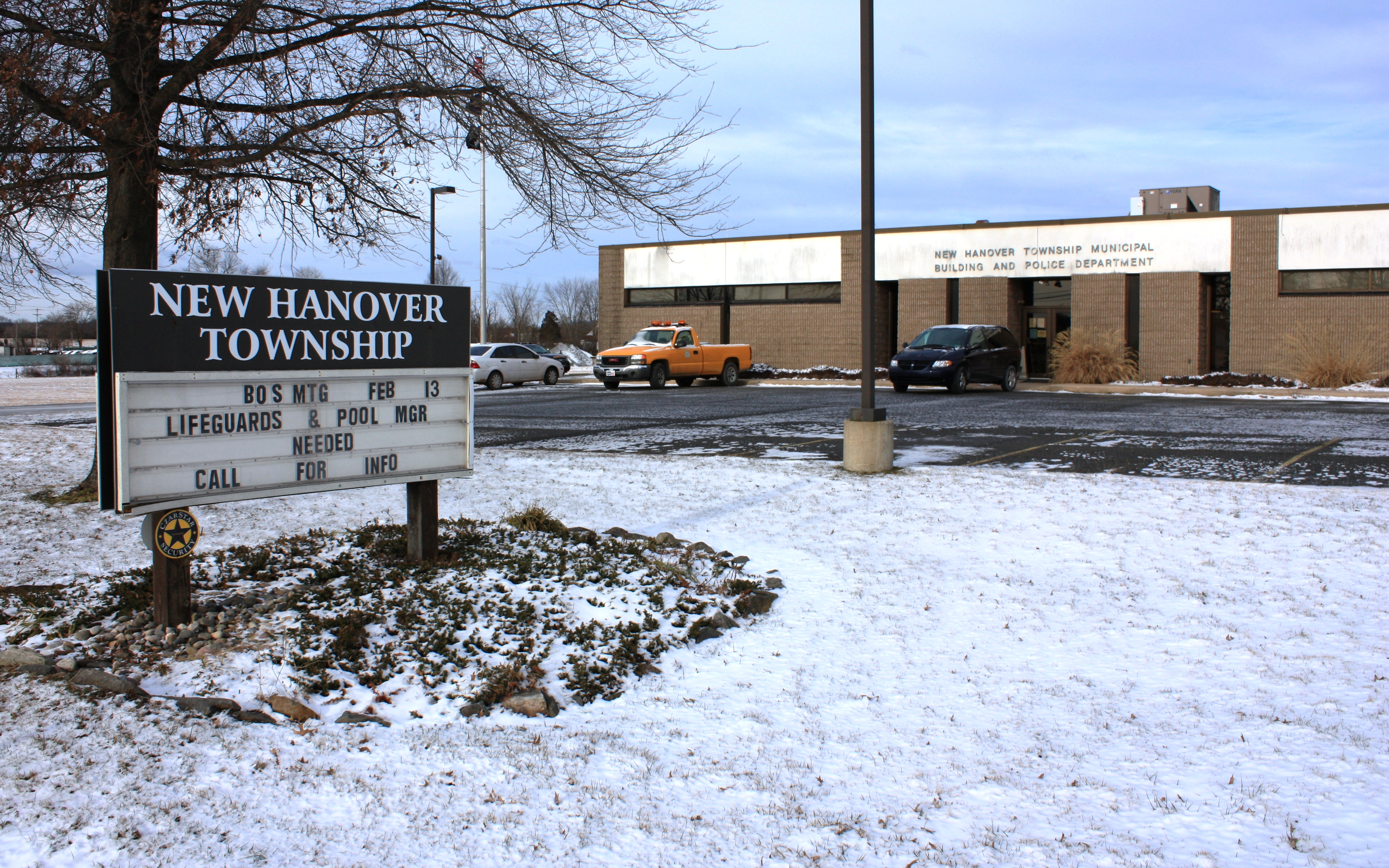
New Hanover Township Building

Presidential elections results
Year	Republican	Democratic
2020	54.8% 4,228	43.6% 3,359
2016	56.3% 3,373	38.9% 2,332
2012	56.3% 2,870	42.1% 2,143
2008	51.2% 2,514	47.9% 2,352
2004	56.5% 2,398	43.0% 1,825
2000	55.7% 1,655	41.3% 1,225
1996	49.2% 1,173	36.1% 861
1992	42.1% 1,026	30.8% 751

== Board of Supervisors ==
New Hanover is a second-class township and elects five at-large supervisors

- Marie Livelsberger - Chair
- Kurt Zebrowski - Vice Chair
- William Ross Snook
- Boone Flint
- Keith Youse

== Transportation ==
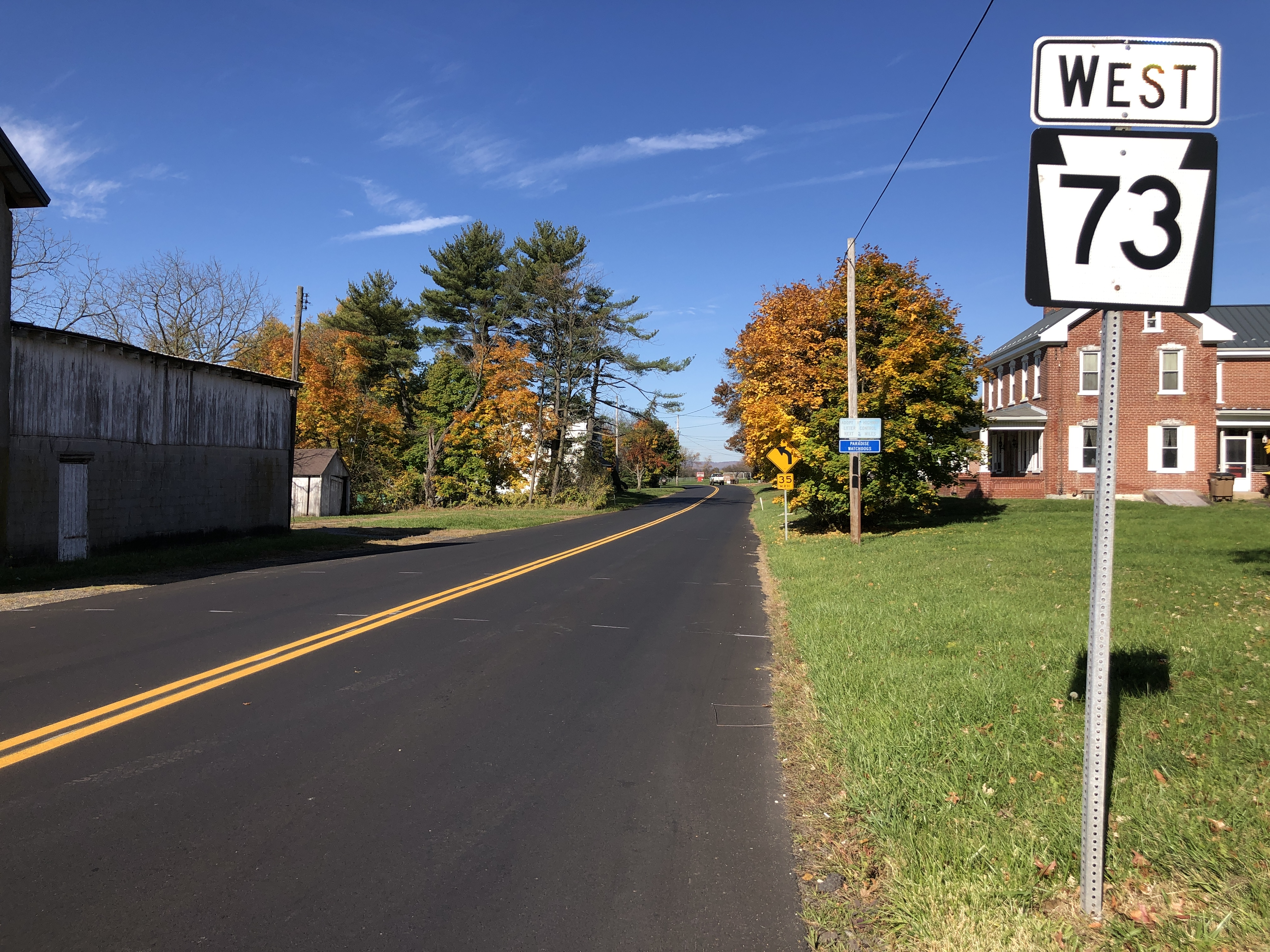
PA 73 westbound in New Hanover Township

As of 2020 there were 89.23 miles (143.60 km) of public roads in New Hanover Township, of which 10.11 miles (16.27 km) were maintained by the Pennsylvania Department of Transportation (PennDOT) and 79.12 miles (127.33 km) were maintained by the township.

Pennsylvania Route 73 and Pennsylvania Route 663 are the primary highways serving New Hanover Township. PA 73 follows an east-west alignment along Big Road, while PA 663 follows a northeast-southwest alignment along North Charlotte Street and Layfield Road. The two routes also share a brief concurrency near the center of the township. Pottstown Area Rapid Transit (PART) provides bus service to the western section of the township along the Orange Line route, which heads south to Pottstown.
