= Swamp Creek (Pennsylvania) =

Tributary of Perkiomen Creek in Pennsylvania

Coordinates: 40°16′06″N 75°27′57″W

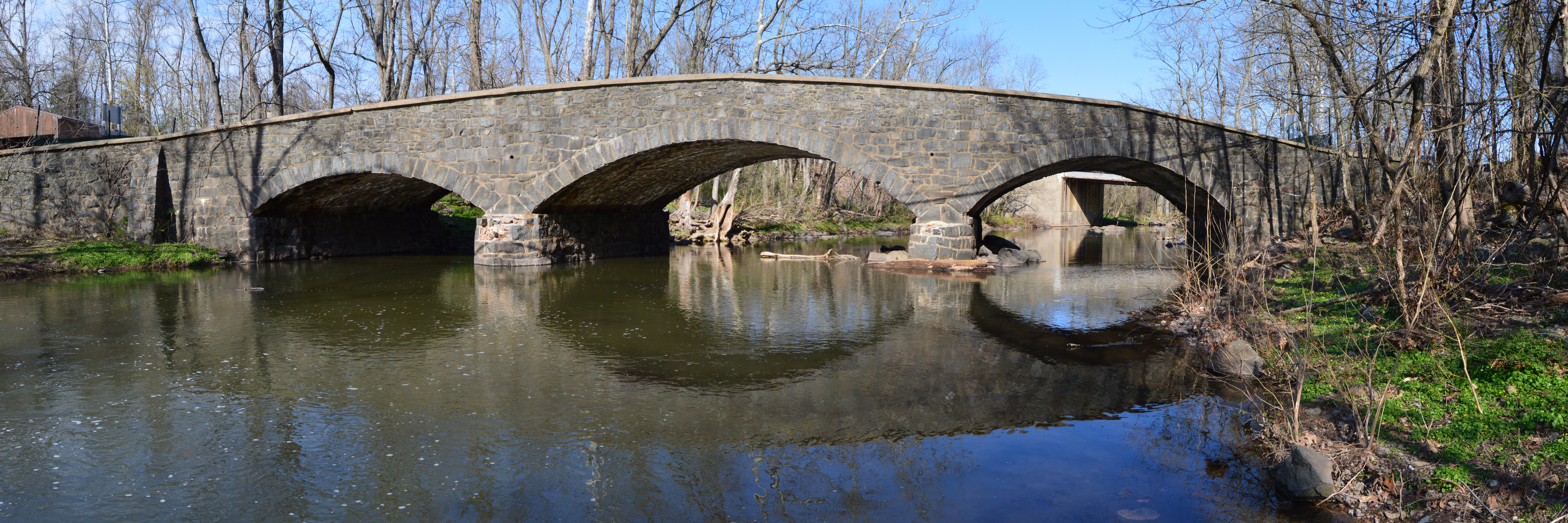
Swamp Creek bridge in Zeiglersville

Swamp Creek is an 18.8-mile-long (30.3 km) tributary of Perkiomen Creek in Berks and Montgomery counties, Pennsylvania in the United States.

Swamp Creek begins in Berks County then flows through Montgomery County to join Perkiomen Creek above Schwenksville.

== History ==
Swamp Creek has historically powered several mills along its waters, with mills being built as early as 1736. By 1884, four gristmills and three sawmills were operating on the creek in New Hanover Township. One surviving mill, the Sunrise Mill, is owned by Montgomery County and is part of Sunrise Mill Park.

Swamp Creek is known as West Swamp Creek. Guide signs in Limerick Township refer the creek by this name. Another Perkiomen tributary bore the name Swamp Creek, or East Swamp Creek. It is now known as the present day Unami Creek.

== See also ==
- List of rivers of Pennsylvania
