= PIAA District 9 =

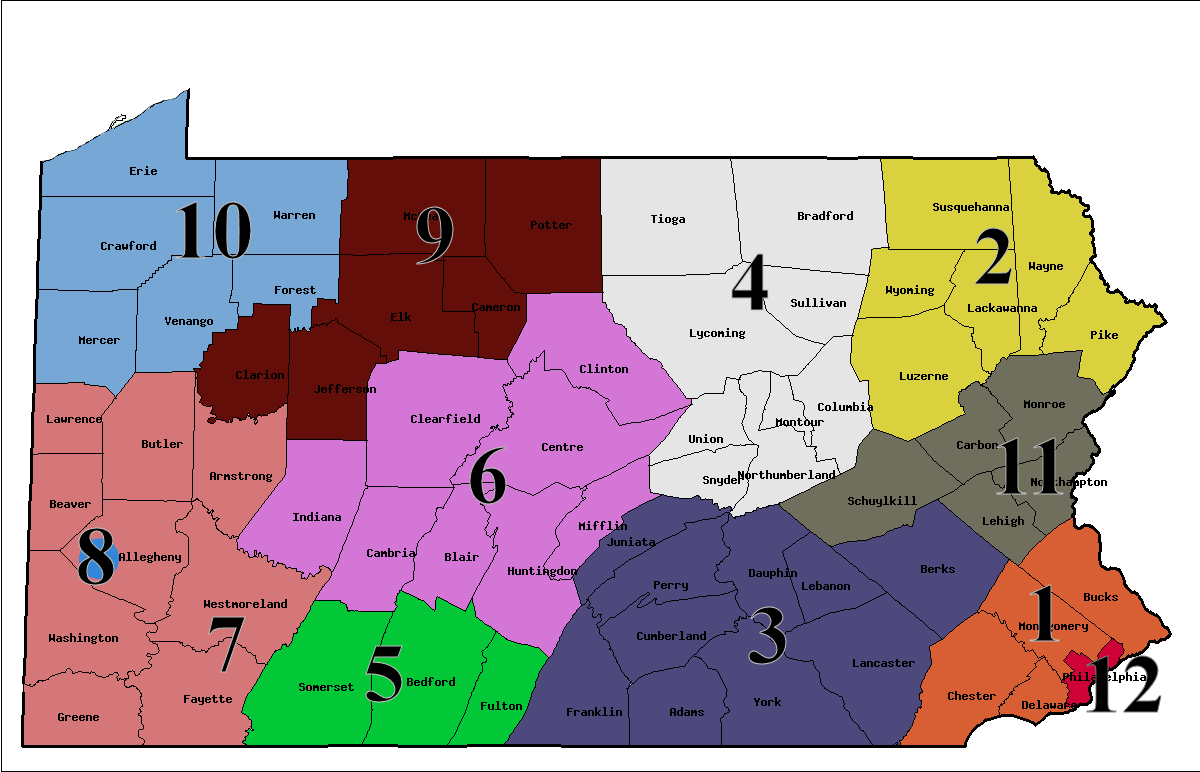
District 9 in Pennsylvania shown in maroon.

District 9 or District IX of the Pennsylvania Interscholastic Athletic Association (PIAA) is an interscholastic athletic association in the North Central Mountain Region of Pennsylvania, United States. The district consists of the 6 counties of Cameron, Clarion, Elk, Jefferson, McKean and Potter. As of the 2022–23 and 2023-24 school years, District 9 will have 35 member high schools competing in various fall, winter and spring sports. 11 of the 35 schools are located outside of the district from Butler, Clearfield, Forest, Venango and Warren counties, but compete in District 9 sports competitions. The district is located in a very rural area of northern Pennsylvania, mostly made up of fields, forests, hills and mountains.

== Sports ==
=== Fall Sports ===
Boys
- Cross Country
- Golf
- Football
- Soccer

Girls
- Cross Country
- Golf
- Soccer
- Tennis
- Volleyball

=== Winter Sports ===
Boys
- Basketball
- Swimming & Diving
- Wrestling

Girls
- Basketball
- Cheer
- Swimming & Diving

=== Spring Sports ===
Boys
- Baseball
- Tennis
- Track and Field
- Volleyball

Girls
- Softball
- Track and Field

== Member Schools ==
District IX school locations
(Member Schools inside of District IX in blue; Member Schools outside of District IX in red)

Schools and Sports Classifications (Boys)
| School | Baseball | Basketball | Cross Country | Football | Golf | Soccer | Swimming/Diving | Tennis | Track/Field | Volleyball | Wrestling |
|---|---|---|---|---|---|---|---|---|---|---|---|
| Allegheny-Clarion Valley | A | A | A | A | AA | | | | AA | | |
| Austin | | A | | | | | | | | | |
| Bradford | AAA | AAA | AA | AAA | AAA | AA | AA | AA | AAA | | AAA |
| Brockway | A | AA | A | A | AA | A | | AA | | | AA |
| Brookville | AA | AA | AA | AA | AA | AA | AA | | AA | | AA |
| Cameron County | A | A | | A | AA | | | | AA | | AA |
| Clarion | A | A | A | A | AA | | | | AA | | AA |
| Clarion-Limestone | A | A | A | A | AA | A | | | AA | | |
| Clearfield | AAA | AAA | AA | AAA | AAA | AA | AA | AA | AAA | | AAA |
| Coudersport | A | A | A | A | AA | A | | | AA | | AA |
| Cranberry | AA | AA | A | | AA | | | | AA | | AA |
| Curwensville | A | AA | | A | AA | A | | | | | AA |
| DuBois | AAAA | AAAA | AAA | AAAA | AAA | AAA | AAA | AAA | AAA | AAA | AAA |
| DuBois Central Catholic | A | A | A | | A | A | | AA | | | |
| East Forest | A | | | | | | | | | | |
| Elk County Catholic | A | A | A | A | AA | A | | AA | AA | | |
| Johnsonburg | AA | A | A | (merged with Ridgway Football) | | | | AA | AA | | AA |
| Kane | AA | AA | A | A | AA | A | | | AA | | AA |
| Karns City | AA | AA | AA | AA | AA | A | | | AA | | |
| Keystone | A | AA | A | A | AA | A | | | AA | | AA |
| Moniteau | AA | AA | A | AA | AA | | | | AA | | |
| North Clarion | A | A | A | | | | | | AA | | |
| Northern Potter | A | A | A | | | A | | | AA | | |
| Oswayo Valley | A | A | A | | AA | | | | AA | | AA |
| Otto-Eldred | A | A | A | A | AA | | | | AA | | |
| Port Allegany | A | AA | A | A | AA | A | | | AA | | AA |
| Punxsutawney | AAAA | AAA | AA | AAA | AAA | AA | | AA | AAA | | AAA |
| Redbank Valley | A | AA | | A | AA | A | | | AA | | AA |
| Ridgway | A | A | A | A | AA | A | | | | | AA |
| Saint Marys | AAA | AAA | AA | AA | AA | AA | AA | AA | AAA | | AAA |
| Sheffield | A | | | A | | | | | AA | | AA |
| Smethport | A | A | A | A | AA | A | | | AA | | AA |
| Union | A | A | A | A | AA | | | | AA | | |
| Venango Catholic | A | A | | | AA | | | | | | |
| West Forest | | A | | | AA | A | | | | | |

Schools and Sports Classifications (Girls)
| School | Basketball | Cheerleading | Cross Country | Golf | Soccer | Softball | Swimming/Diving | Tennis | Track/Field | Volleyball |
|---|---|---|---|---|---|---|---|---|---|---|
| Allegheny-Clarion Valley | A | AAAA | A | AA | | A | | | AA | A |
| Austin | A | | | | | A | | | | A |
| Bradford | AAA | AAAA | AA | AAA | AA | AAA | AA | AA | AAA | AA |
| Brockway | AA | | A | AA | A | A | | AA | | A |
| Brookville | AA | | AA | AA | A | AA | AA | | AA | AA |
| Cameron County | A | | | AA | | A | | | AA | A |
| Clarion | A | AAAA | A | AA | A | A | | | AA | A |
| Clarion-Limestone | A | AAAA | A | | | A | | | AA | A |
| Clearfield | AAA | | AA | AA | AA | AAA | AA | AA | AAA | AA |
| Coudersport | A | | A | AA | | A | | | AA | A |
| Cranberry | AA | AAAA | A | AA | | AA | | | AA | A |
| Curwensville | AA | AAAA | | AA | A | A | | | | A |
| DuBois | AAAA | AAAA | AAA | AAA | AAA | AAAA | AAA | AAA | AAA | AAA |
| DuBois Central Catholic | A | AAAA | A | | A | A | | | | A |
| East Forest | | | | | | A | | | | A |
| Elk County Catholic | A | AAAA | A | | A | A | | AA | AA | A |
| Johnsonburg | A | | A | | | AA | | AA | AA | A |
| Kane | AA | AAAA | A | AA | A | A | | | AA | A |
| Karns City | AA | | AA | AA | A | AA | | | AA | AA |
| Keystone | A | AAAA | A | AA | A | A | | | AA | A |
| Moniteau | AA | | A | AA | | AA | | | AA | A |
| North Clarion | A | AAAA | A | | | | | | AA | A |
| Northern Potter | A | | A | | | A | | | AA | A |
| Oswayo Valley | A | | A | AA | | A | | | AA | A |
| Otto-Eldred | A | | A | AA | | A | | | AA | A |
| Port Allegany | A | | A | AA | A | A | | | AA | A |
| Punxsutawney | AAA | AAAA | AA | AA | AA | AAA | | AA | AAA | AA |
| Redbank Valley | AA | AAAA | | AA | A | AA | | | AA | A |
| Ridgway | A | | A | AA | A | | | | | A |
| Saint Marys | AAA | AAAA | AA | | AA | AAA | AA | AA | AAA | AA |
| Sheffield | A | | | | | A | | | AA | A |
| Smethport | A | | A | AA | A | A | | | AA | A |
| Union | A | | A | AA | | | | | AA | A |
| Venango Catholic | A | | | | | AAA | | | | A |
| West Forest | A | | | | A | A | | | | |

== State Champions ==
Boys
- Baseball (DuBois Central Catholic 2001 (A), Johnsonburg 2013 (A), Punxsutawney 2007 (AAA)), Clarion Area 2023 (A)
- Basketball (Elk County Catholic 2006 (A) and Kane 1949 (AA))
- Cross Country (Oswayo Valley 1984 (AA) and Punxsutawney 1977 (AAA))
- Track & Field (Clarion 2000 & 2001 (AA))
- Wrestling (team championships - Clearfield 1986 (AAA) and Brookville 1999 (AA) - individual championships are numerous, however the most state individual state titles belong to Clearfield with 40 since 1938.)

Girls
- Basketball (Cranberry 1992, 1993 & 1994 (AA) - member of District 10, Karns City 2000 (AA) and Venango Catholic 1980 (A) - member of District 10)
- Cross Country (Brookville 1995 & 1996 (AA))
- Softball (Curwensville 2007 & 2009 (A))
- Track & Field (Bradford 2006 (AAA))
- Volleyball (Clarion 2012 (A))

== Member Schools outside of District IX ==
11 of the 35 District IX member schools are located outside of the counties within the district.

- Clearfield (Clearfield County)
- Cranberry (Venango County)
- Curwensville (Clearfield County)
- DuBois (Clearfield County)
- DuBois Central Catholic (Clearfield County)
- East Forest (Forest County)
- Karns City (Butler County)
- Moniteau (Butler County)
- Sheffield (Warren County)
- Venango Catholic (Venango County)
- West Forest (Forest County)
