= Cranberry Area School District =

School district in Pennsylvania, U.S.

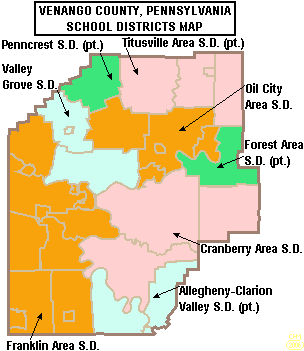

Address
- 3 Education Drive Seneca, Venango, Pennsylvania, 16346; United States

District information
- Type: Public
- Grades: K-12
- President: Brennan Buzard
- Superintendent: Bill Vonada

Students and staff
- Enrollment: 1201 pupils enrolled in 2010
- Athletic conference: PIAA District IX
- District mascot: Super Berry
- Colors: Maroon, gold

Other information
- Website: www.cranberrysd.org

The Cranberry Area School District is a small, rural, public school district which serves the residents of Cranberry Township, Pinegrove Township and Rockland Township in Venango County, Pennsylvania. Cranberry Area School District encompasses approximately 155 square miles (400 km^{2}). According to 2000 federal census data, it serves a resident population of 9,698. In 2009, the per capita income of district residents was $16,307, while the median family income was $39,203 a year. In the Commonwealth, the median family income was $49,501, and the United States median family income was $49,445, in 2010. Per school district officials, in school year 2007-08 the Cranberry Area School District provided basic educational services to 1271 pupils through the employment of 115 teachers, 77 full-time and part-time support personnel, and 7 administrators. In 2006, the 1,308 student population was 98% white, 1% black, 1% Asian, Native American <0.1% and <0.2% Hispanic. The Cranberry Area School District received more than $9 million in state funding for school year 2007-08.

The district operates Cranberry Jr/Sr High School (7th-12th) and Cranberry Elementary School (K-6th).

== Academic achievement ==
Cranberry Area School District was ranked 250th out of 498 Pennsylvania school districts, in 2011, by the Pittsburgh Business Times. The ranking was based on five years of student academic performance based on the PSSAs for: reading, writing, mathematics and three years of science.

- 2010 - 251st
- 2009 - 250th
- 2008 - 264th
- 2007 - 323rd out of 501 Pennsylvania school districts

In 2009, the academic achievement, of the students in the Cranberry Area School District, was in the 55th percentile among all 500 Pennsylvania school districts Scale (0-99; 100 is state best).

=== Graduation rate ===
In 2011, Cranberry Area Junior Senior High School's graduation rate was 94%. In 2010, the Pennsylvania Department of Education issued a new, four-year cohort graduation rate. Cranberry Area School District's rate was 88% for 2010.

According to traditional graduation rate calculations:

- 2010 - 89%
- 2009 - 94%
- 2008 - 89%
- 2007 - 89%

=== High school ===
In 2011, Cranberry Area Junior Senior High School improved to "AYP" status. In 2010, the school was in "Making Progress: in School Improvement I" AYP status due to chronic, low student achievement.

PSSA results
11th grade reading

- 2011 - 75% on grade level (12 % below basic). State - 69.1% of 11th gradersweare on grade level.
- 2010 - 74% (8% below basic). State - 66%.
- 2009 - 67% (16% below basic). State - 65%.
- 2008 - 71% (18% below basic). State - 65%.
- 2007 - 71% (16% below basic). State - 65%.

11th grade math

- 2011 - 71% on grade level (14% below basic). In Pennsylvania, 60.3% of 11th graders are on grade level.
- 2010 - 67% (17% below basic). State - 59%.
- 2009 - 54% (17% below basic). State - 56%.
- 2008 - 62% (22% below basic). State - 56%.
- 2007 - 56% (21% below basic). State - 53%.

11th grade science

- 2011 - 45% on grade level (10% below basic). State - 40% of 11th graders were on grade level.
- 2010 - 42% (12% below basic), State - 39%.
- 2009 - 39% (21% below basic). State - 40%.
- 2008 - 28% (26% below basic). State - 39%.

College remediation

According to a Pennsylvania Department of Education study released in January 2009, 21% of Cranberry Area High School graduates required remediation in mathematics and or reading before they were prepared to take college level courses in the Pennsylvania State System of Higher Education or community colleges. Less than 66% of Pennsylvania high school graduates who enroll in a four-year college in Pennsylvania will earn a bachelor's degree within six years. Among Pennsylvania high school graduates pursuing an associate degree, only one in three graduate in three years. Per the Pennsylvania Department of Education, one in three recent high school graduates who attend Pennsylvania's public universities and community colleges takes at least one remedial course in math, reading or English.

=== Graduation requirements ===
The Cranberry Area School Board has determined that a student must earn 23 credits to graduate, including: English four credits, Mathematics three credits (Algebra and Geometry required), Social Studies four credits, Science three credits (Biology required), Health 0.5 credit, Physical Education one credit, Computer 0.5 credits and seven electives.

By law, all Pennsylvania secondary school students must complete a project as a part of their eligibility to graduate from high school. The type of project, its rigor and its expectations are set by the individual school district. The students at Cranberry Area High School are required to write a research paper and give an oral presentation.

By Pennsylvania State School Board regulations, for the graduating classes of 2016, students must demonstrate successful completion of secondary level course work in Algebra I, Biology, English Composition, and Literature for which the Keystone Exams serve as the final course exams. Students’ Keystone Exam scores shall count for at least one-third of the final course grade.

==== Dual enrollment ====
The high school offers the Pennsylvania dual enrollment program. This state program permits high school students to take courses, at local higher education institutions, to earn college credits. The students continue to have full access to activities and programs at their high school. The college credits are offered at a deeply discounted rate. The state offers a small grant to assist students in costs for tuition, fees and books. Under the Pennsylvania Transfer and Articulation Agreement, many Pennsylvania colleges and universities accept these credits for students who transfer to their institutions. The Pennsylvania College Credit Transfer System reported in 2009, that students saved nearly $35.4 million by having their transferred credits count towards a degree under the new system. In 2010, the district received a $4,130 state grant to be used to assist students with tuition, fees and books. The grant was discontinued in 2011 however the program's opportunities continue to be available.

=== SAT scores ===
From January to June 2011, 50 of the district's students took the SAT exams. The district's average verbal score was 488. The Math average score was 502. The average writing score was 475. Pennsylvania ranked 40th among state with SAT scores: Verbal - 493, Math - 501, Writing - 479. In the United States 1.65 million students took the exam in 2011. They averaged 497 (out of 800) verbal, 514 math and 489 in writing.

=== Junior high ===
8th grade reading

- 2011 - 83% on grade level (8% below basic). In Pennsylvania, 81.8% of 8th graders were on grade level.
- 2010 - 81% on grade level. 58% advanced (9% below basic) State - 81%.
- 2009 - 77%, 51% advanced (14% below basic), State - 80%.
- 2008 - 77%, 50% advanced (12% below basic), State - 78%.
- 2007 - 70%, 38% advanced (15% below basic), State - 75%.

8th grade math

- 2011 - 87% on grade level, 56% advanced (3% below basic). State - 76.9%.
- 2010 - 76% on grade level, 58% advanced (8% below basic). State - 75%.
- 2009 - 72%, 45% advanced (13% below basic). State - 71%.
- 2008 - 72%, 44% advanced (16% below basic). State - 70%.
- 2007 - 72%, 44% advanced (13% below basic). State - 67%.

8th grade science

- 2011 - 64% on grade level (19% below basic). State – 58.3% of 8th graders were on grade level.
- 2010 - 54% (22% below basic). State - 57%.
- 2009 - 55%, State - 54%.
- 2008 - 66%, State - 52%.

7th grade reading

- 2011 - 71% on grade level (6% below basic). State – 76%.
- 2010 - 69%, 39% advanced (13% below basic) State - 73%.
- 2009 - 82%, 45% advanced (9% below basic), State - 71.7%.
- 2008 - 71%, 35% advanced (17% below basic), State - 70%.
- 2007 - 77%, 41% advanced (13% below basic), State - 66%.

7th grade math

- 2011 - 85% on grade level. 67% advanced (3% below basic). State - 78.6%.
- 2010 - 86%, 67% advanced (5% below basic) State - 77%.
- 2009 - 87%, 63% advanced (9% below basic), State - 75%.
- 2008 - 81%, 60% advanced (11% below basic), State - 72%.
- 2007 - 83%, 64% advanced (8% below basic), State - 67%.

== Elementary schools ==
- Cranberry Elementary School provides kindergarten through 6th grade for 449 students employing 34 teachers, in 2010. The school achieved AYP in 2010 and 2011. In 2011, 80% of the students (grades 3-6) were on grade level in math. Just 70% of the 3rd through 6th graders were reading on grade level with 64% of boys and 76% of girls successful in reading.
- Pinegrove Elementary School provides kindergarten through 5th grade for 79 students employing 8 teachers, in 2010. The school achieved AYP in 2010 and 2011. In 2011, 93% of the students (grades 3-5) were on grade level in math. In reading, 93% of the 3rd through 5th graders were reading on grade level.
- Rockland Elementary School provides kindergarten through 5th grade for 69 students employing 8 teachers, in 2010. The school achieved AYP in 2010 and 2011. In 2011, 78% of the students (grades 3-5) were on grade level in math with only 63% of boys on grade level while 94% of girls were successful. In reading, 73% of the 3rd through 5th graders were reading on grade level. Just 53% of boys read on grade level, while 94% of girls were reading on grade level.

== Special education ==
In December 2009, the district administration reported that 230 pupils or 18.9% of the district's pupils received special education services.

In accordance with state and federal law, the district engages in identification procedures to ensure that eligible students receive an appropriate educational program consisting of special education and related services, individualized to meet student needs. At no cost to the parents, these services are provided in compliance with state and federal law; and are reasonably calculated to yield meaningful educational benefit and student progress. To identify students who may be eligible for special education, various screening activities are conducted on an ongoing basis. These screening activities include: review of group-based data (cumulative records, enrollment records, health records, report cards, ability and achievement test scores); hearing, vision, motor, and speech/language screening; and review by the Instructional Support Team or Student Assistance Team. When screening results suggest that the student may be eligible, the district seeks parental consent to conduct a multidisciplinary evaluation. Parents who suspect their child is eligible may verbally request a multidisciplinary evaluation from a professional employee of the district or contact the Special Education Department.

In 2010, the state of Pennsylvania provided $1,026,815,000 for special education services. This funding is in addition to the state's basic education per pupil funding, as well as, all other state and federal funding. The Pennsylvania Special Education funding system estimates that 16% of the district's students receive special education services. It also assumes that each student's needs accrue the same level of costs. The state requires each district to have a three-year special education plan to meet the unique needs of its special education students. Overidentification of students in order to increase state funding has been an issue in the Commonwealth. Some districts have more than 20% of its students receiving special education services while others have 10% supported through special education.

Cranberry Area School District received a $829,468 supplement for special education services in 2010. For the 2011-12 school year, all Pennsylvania public school districts received the same level of funding for special education that they received in 2010-11. This level funding is provided regardless of changes in the number of pupils who need special education services and regardless of the level of services the respective students required.

=== Gifted education ===
The District Administration reported that 24 or 2% of its students were gifted in 2009. By law, the district must provide mentally gifted programs at all grade levels. The primary emphasis is on enrichment and acceleration of the regular education curriculum through a push in model with the gifted instructor in the classroom with the regular instructor. This approach permits such specialized instructional strategies as tiered assignments, curriculum compacting, flexible grouping, learning stations, independent projects and independent contracts. Students identified as gifted attending the high school have access to honors and advanced placement courses, and dual enrollment with local colleges. The referral process for a gifted evaluation can be initiated by teachers or parents by contacting the student's building principal and requesting an evaluation. All requests must be made in writing. To be eligible for mentally gifted programs in Pennsylvania, a student must have a cognitive ability of at least 130 as measured on a standardized ability test by a certified school psychologist. Other factors that indicate giftedness will also be considered for eligibility.

== Bullying and school safety ==
The Cranberry Area School District administration reported there were no incidents of bullying in the district in 2009. There were two incidents of a student threatening a school official.

The Cranberry Area School Board has provided the district's antibully policy online. All Pennsylvania schools are required to have an anti-bullying policy incorporated into their Code of Student Conduct. The policy must identify disciplinary actions for bullying and designate a school staff person to receive complaints of bullying. The policy must be available on the school's website and posted in every classroom. All Pennsylvania public schools must provide a copy of its anti-bullying policy to the Office for Safe Schools every year, and shall review their policy every three years. Additionally, the district must conduct an annual review of that policy with students. The Center for Schools and Communities works in partnership with the Pennsylvania Commission on Crime & Delinquency and the Pennsylvania Department of Education to assist schools and communities as they research, select and implement bullying prevention programs and initiatives.

Education standards relating to student safety and antiharassment programs are described in the 10.3. Safety and Injury Prevention in the Pennsylvania Academic Standards for Health, Safety and Physical Education.

== Budget ==
In 2009, the district reports employing over 80 teachers with a starting salary of $36,215 for 184 days for pupil instruction. The average teacher salary was $51,205, while the maximum salary is $107,040. As of 2007, Pennsylvania ranked in the top 10 states in average teacher salaries. When adjusted for cost of living Pennsylvania ranked fourth in the nation for teacher compensation. The school day is limited by the union contract to 7.5 hours. The administration is required to appoint 11 teacher coordinators who receive compensation for the title. Additionally, Cranberry Area School District teachers receive a defined benefit pension, health insurance, professional development reimbursement, paid personal days, 10 sick days and other benefits. Teachers are paid extra when they are required to work outside of the regular school day hours. According to State Rep. Glen Grell, a trustee of the Pennsylvania Public School Employees’ Retirement System Board, a 40-year educator can retire with a pension equal to 100 percent of their final salary.

In 2007, the district employed 99 teachers. The average teacher salary in the district was $48,400 for 180 school days worked.

Cranberry Area School District administrative costs per pupil was $589 per pupil, in 2008. The district is ranked 450th out of 500 in Pennsylvania for administrative spending. The lowest administrative cost per pupil in Pennsylvania was $398 per pupil.

In 2008, Cranberry Area School District reported spending $11,805 per pupil. This ranked 294th in the commonwealth. In 2010, the per pupil spending had increased to $13,465.49. Among the states, Pennsylvania's total per pupil revenue (including all sources) ranked 11th at $15,023 per student, in 2008-09. In 2007, the Pennsylvania per pupil total expenditures was $12,759.

Reserves

In 2009, the district reported $1,587,533 in an unreserved-undesignated fund balance. The unreserved-designated fund balance was reported as $1,110,573. In 2010, the district's unreserved-undesignated fund rose to $1,415,523.00 while the designated fund increased to $2,357,623. Pennsylvania school district reserve funds are divided into two categories – designated and undesignated. The undesignated funds are not committed to any planned project. Designated funds and any other funds, such as capital reserves, are allocated to specific projects. School districts are required by state law to keep 5 percent of their annual spending in the undesignated reserve funds to preserve bond ratings. According to the Pennsylvania Department of Education, from 2003 to 2010, as a whole, Pennsylvania school districts amassed nearly $3 billion in reserved funds.

In December 2009, the Pennsylvania Auditor General conducted a performance audit of the district. Findings were reported to the administration and school board.

The district is funded by a combination of: a local earned income tax 0.05%, a property tax, a statewide real estate transfer tax 0.5%, per capita tax $5.00, flat rate occupation $10, coupled with substantial funding from the Commonwealth of Pennsylvania and the federal government. Grants can provide an opportunity to supplement school funding without raising local taxes. In the Commonwealth of Pennsylvania, pension and Social Security income are exempted from state personal income tax and local earned income tax regardless of the individual's wealth.

=== State basic education funding ===
In 2011-12, the Cranberry Area School District received $6,494,524 in state basic education funding. Additionally, the district will receive $96,121 in accountability block grant funding. The enacted Pennsylvania state Education budget includes $5,354,629,000 for the 2011-2012 basic education funding appropriation. This amount is a $233,290,000 increase (4.6%) over the enacted State appropriation for 2010-2011. The highest increase in state basic education funding was awarded to Duquesne City School District, which got a 49% increase in state funding for 2011-12. Districts experienced a reduction in funding due to the loss of federal stimulus funding, which ended in 2011. In 2010, the district reported that 462 pupils received a free or reduced-price lunch due to the family meeting the federal poverty level.

For 2010-11, the Cranberry Area School District received a 2% increase in state Basic Education Funding resulting in a $6,851,632 payment. Valley Grove School District received a 3.88% increase, which was the highest increase in BEF in Venango County. Kennett Consolidated School District in Chester County received the highest increase in the state at 23.65% increase in funding for the 2010-11 school year. One hundred fifty school districts received the base 2% increase in 2010-11. The amount of increase each school district receives is determined by the governor and the secretary of education, through the allocation set in the state budget proposal made in February each year.

In the 2009-2010 budget year, the Commonwealth of Pennsylvania provided a 3.43% increase in Basic Education funding for a total of $6,717,286. The state Basic Education funding to the district in 2008-09 was $6,494,524.12. The district also received supplemental funding for English language learners, Title 1 federal funding for low-income students, for district size, a poverty supplement from the commonwealth and more. Franklin Area School District received a 6.43% increase, the highest increase in Venango County for the 2009-10 school year. Among the 500 school districts in Pennsylvania, Muhlenberg School District in Berks County received the highest with a 22.31% increase in funding.

According to the Pennsylvania Department of Education, 442 district students received free or reduced-price lunches due to low family income in the 2007-2008 school year.

==== Accountability block grants ====
Beginning in 2004-2005, the state launched accountability block grant school funding. This program has provided $1.5 billion to Pennsylvania's school districts. The program requires that its taxpayer dollars are focused on specific interventions that are most likely to increase student academic achievement. These interventions include: teacher training, All Day Kindergarten, lower class size K-3rd grade, literacy and math coaching programs that provide teachers with individualized job-embedded professional development to improve their instruction, before or after school tutoring assistance to struggling students. For 2010-11, the Cranberry Area School District applied for and received $260,896 in addition to all other state and federal funding. The district used the funding to provide intensive instruction for struggling pupils and to employ math and literacy coaches to train teachers in effective instruction for the 7th year.

==== Classrooms for the Future grant ====
The Classroom for the Future state program provided districts with hundreds of thousands of extra state funding to buy laptop computers for each core curriculum high school class (English, Science, History, Math) and paid for teacher training to optimize the computers use. The program was funded from 2006 to 2009. Cranberry Area School District Administration did not apply for funding in any of the three years it was available. Of the 501 public school districts in Pennsylvania, 447 received Classrooms for the Future state grant awards.

=== Federal Stimulus grant ===
The district received an extra $1,737,328 in ARRA - Federal Stimulus money to be used in specific programs like special education and meeting the academic needs of low-income students. The funding was limited to the 2009–10 and 2010-11 school years.

==== Race to the Top grant ====
School district officials did not apply for the Race to the Top federal grant which would have brought the district up to one million additional federal dollars for improving student academic achievement. Participation required the administration, the school board and the local teachers' union to sign an agreement to prioritize improving student academic success. In Pennsylvania, 120 public school districts and 56 charter schools agreed to participate. Pennsylvania was not approved for the grant. According to then Governor Rendell, failure of districts to agree to participate was cited as one reason that Pennsylvania was not approved.

=== Common Cents state initiative ===
The Cranberry Area School Board chose to participate in the Pennsylvania Department of Education Common Cents program. The program called for the state to audit the district, at no cost to local taxpayers, to identify ways the district could save tax dollars. After the review of the information, the district was not required to implement the recommended cost savings changes. The review identified potential annual savings of over $78,000 over a variety of cost centers, including food services, transportation, purchasing and utility costs. Opportunities for savings in food services and utility costs appeared particularly promising for the district.

=== Real estate taxes ===
The Cranberry Area School Board set property tax rates in 2011-2012 at 12.4280 mills. A mill is $1 of tax for every $1,000 of a property's assessed value. Irregular property reassessments have become a serious issue in the commonwealth as it creates a significant disparity in taxation within a community and across a region. Pennsylvania school district revenues are dominated by two main sources: 1) Property tax collections, which account for the vast majority (between 75-85% of local revenues; and 2) Act 511 tax collections (Local Tax Enabling Act), which are around 15% of revenues for school districts.

- 2010-11 - 12.4280 mills
- 2009-10 - 11.9500 mills
- 2008-09 - 11.9500 mills
- 2007-08 - 11.9500 mills

==== Act 1 adjusted index ====
The Act 1 of 2006 Index regulates the rates at which each school district can raise property taxes in Pennsylvania. Districts are not authorized to raise taxes above that index unless they allow voters to vote by referendum, or they seek an exception from the state Department of Education. The base index for the 2011-2012 school year is 1.4 percent, but the Act 1 Index can be adjusted higher, depending on a number of factors, such as property values and the personal income of district residents. Act 1 included 10 exceptions, including: increasing pension costs, increases in special education costs, a catastrophe like a fire or flood, increase in health insurance costs for contracts in effect in 2006 or dwindling tax bases. The base index is the average of the percentage increase in the statewide average weekly wage, as determined by the PA Department of Labor and Industry, for the preceding calendar year and the percentage increase in the Employment Cost Index for Elementary and Secondary Schools, as determined by the Bureau of Labor Statistics in the U.S. Department of Labor, for the previous 12-month period ending June 30. For a school district with a market value/personal income aid ratio (MV/PI AR) greater than 0.4000, its index equals the base index multiplied by the sum of .75 and its MV/PI AR for the current year. In June 2011, the Pennsylvania General Assembly eliminated six of the ten the exceptions to the Act 1 Index. The following exceptions were maintained: 1) costs to pay interest and principal on indebtedness incurred prior to September 4, 2004 for Act 72 schools and prior to June 27, 2006 for non-Act 72 schools; 2) costs to pay interest and principal on electoral debt; 3) costs incurred in providing special education programs and services (beyond what is already paid by the State); and 4) costs due to increases of more than the Index in the school's share of payments to PSERS (PA school employees pension fund) taking into account the state mandated PSERS contribution rate.

The school district adjusted index for the Cranberry Area School District, 2006-2007 through 2011-2012, is as follows.

- 2006-07 - 5.4%, base 3.9%
- 2007-08 - 4.7%, base 3.4%
- 2008-09 - 6.1%, base 4.4%
- 2009-10 - 5.6%, base 4.1%
- 2010-11 - 4.0%, base 2.9%
- 2011-12 - 1.9%, base 1.4%
- 2012-13 - 2.3%, base 1.7%

For the school budget years 2010-11 and 2011–12, the Cranberry Area School Board did not apply for any exceptions to the Act 1 index. Each year, the school district has the option of adopting either 1) a resolution in January certifying they will not increase taxes above their index or 2) a preliminary budget in February. A school district adopting the resolution may not apply for referendum exceptions or ask voters for a tax increase above the inflation index. A specific timeline for these decisions is publisher each year by the Pennsylvania Department of Education.

For the 2011-2012 school year budgets, 247 school districts adopted a resolution certifying that tax rates would not be increased above their index; 250 school districts adopted a preliminary budget. Of the 250 school districts that adopted a preliminary budget, 231 adopted real estate tax rates that exceeded their index. Tax rate increases in the other 19 school districts that adopted a preliminary budget did not exceed the school district's index. Of the districts who sought exceptions 221 used the pension costs exemption and 171 sought a Special Education costs exemption. Only one school district sought an exemption for Nonacademic School Construction Project, while one sought an exception for Electoral debt for school construction. With the 2011 state education budget, the General Assembly repealed most of the Act 1 tax increase exceptions leaving only special education costs, pension costs and prior voter approved (ballot referendum) debt for construction. The cost of construction projects in the future will go to the voters for approval via ballot referendum. Districts can no longer raise property taxes to cover increasing health insurance costs for employees.

Cranberry Area School Board did not apply for exceptions to exceed the Act 1 index for the budgets in 2009-10 or in 2010-11. In the Spring of 2010, 135 Pennsylvania school boards asked to exceed their adjusted index. Approval was granted to 133 of them, and 128 sought an exception for pension costs increases.

==== Property tax relief ====
In 2009, the Homestead/Farmstead Property Tax Relief from gambling for the Cranberry Area School District was $203 per approved permanent primary residence. In the district, 2,900 property owners applied for the tax relief. The tax relief was subtracted from the total annual school property on the individual's tax bill. Property owners apply for the relief through the county treasurer's office. Farmers can qualify for a farmstead exemption on building used for agricultural purposes. The farm must be at least 10 contiguous acres (40,000 m^{2}) and must be the primary residence of the owner. Farmers can qualify for both the homestead exemption and the farmstead exemption. The Pennsylvania Auditor General found that 73% of property owners applied for tax relief in Venango County. In Lycoming County, the highest property tax relief in 2009 was $245 awarded to the approved property owners in Oil City Area School District. Pennsylvania awarded the highest property tax relief to residents of the Chester-Upland School District in Delaware County at $632 per homestead and farmstead in 2010. This was the second year Chester Upland School District was the top recipient.

Additionally, the Pennsylvania Property Tax/Rent Rebate program is provided for low income Pennsylvanians aged 65 and older; widows and widowers aged 50 and older; and people with disabilities age 18 and older. The income limit is $35,000 for homeowners. The maximum rebate for both homeowners and renters is $650. Applicants can exclude one-half (1/2) of their Social Security income, consequently individuals who have income substantially more than $35,000, may still qualify for a rebate. Individuals must apply annually for the rebate. This can be taken in addition to Homestead/Farmstead Property Tax Relief.

Property taxes in Pennsylvania are relatively high on a national scale. According to the Tax Foundation, Pennsylvania ranked 11th in the U.S. in 2008 in terms of property taxes paid as a percentage of home value (1.34%) and 12th in the country in terms of property taxes as a percentage of income (3.55%).

== Enrollment ==
Cranberry Area School District is among the districts with the lowest enrollment, in the Commonwealth of Pennsylvania. The Pennsylvania Department of Education projects the district's enrollment will remain below 1400 pupils through 2020. Shifting population trends across the U.S. and Pennsylvania are affecting school enrollment and may impact the building needs of school districts in the years to come. Over the next 10 years, rural Pennsylvania school enrollment is projected to decrease 8 percent. The most significant enrollment decline is projected to be in western Pennsylvania, where rural school districts may have a 16 percent decline. More than 40 percent of elementary schools and more than 60 percent of secondary schools in western Pennsylvania are projected to experience significant enrollment decreases (15 percent or greater).

A study done by Standard and Poors in 2007 (at the request of the PA General Assembly) examined the district consolidating with each of 5 neighboring districts. It examined consolidation of school administrations with Allegheny-Clarion Valley School District; with Forest Area School District; with Keystone School District; with North Clarion County School District; with Valley Grove School District. The study found that residents in all districts would realize substantial savings in a consolidation of administrations. Savings of hundreds of thousands dollars each year were estimated. Superintendent were asked about savings, if their district were to merge with another district at the administrative level only, but not close any of their schools. It found 42% of survey respondents thought consolidation could achieve cost reductions. Additionally, 63% of responding superintendents believed that consolidation with another district would help provide additional academic enrichment opportunities for the students. In March 2011, the Pennsylvania Institute of Certified Public Accountants Fiscal Responsibility Task Force released a report which found that consolidating school district administrations with one neighboring district would save the Commonwealth $1.2 billion without forcing the consolidation of any schools. The study noted that while the best school districts spent 4% of the annual budget on administration, others spend over 15% on administration.

Pennsylvania has one of the highest numbers of school districts in the nation. In Pennsylvania, 80% of the school districts serve student populations under 5,000, and 40% serve less than 2,000. Less than 95 of Pennsylvania's 501 school districts have enrollment below 1250 students, in 2007.

== Extracurriculars ==
The district provides a wide variety of clubs, activities and sports. Eligibility for participation is set by school board policy. Students are required to maintain a 75% average and can have no failing grades, in order to participate.

By Pennsylvania law, all K-12 students in the district, including those who attend a private nonpublic school, cyber charter school, charter school and those home schooled, are eligible to participate in the extracurricular programs, including all athletics. They must meet the same eligibility rules as the students enrolled in the district's schools.
