= Robert Lamberton =

Robert Lamberton may refer to:

- Robert Lamberton (judge) (1809–1885), founder of the first bank in Venago County and later associate judge of the Courts of Venango County, Pa.
- Robert Eneas Lamberton (1886–1941), American Republican politician
- Robert D. Lamberton, professor of classics at Washington University in St. Louis and translator of Thomas the Obscure
