= FASD (disambiguation) =

Fetal alcohol spectrum disorder is a term describing the range of conditions that result from alcohol exposure during pregnancy. These include physical, behavioral, and neurodevelopment effects as well as learning disabilities.

FASD may also refer to:

- Franklin Area School District, a school system located in Franklin, Pennsylvania
- Freeport Area School District, a Pennsylvania school system
