= DuBois Regional Airport =

Airport in Pennsylvania, United States of America

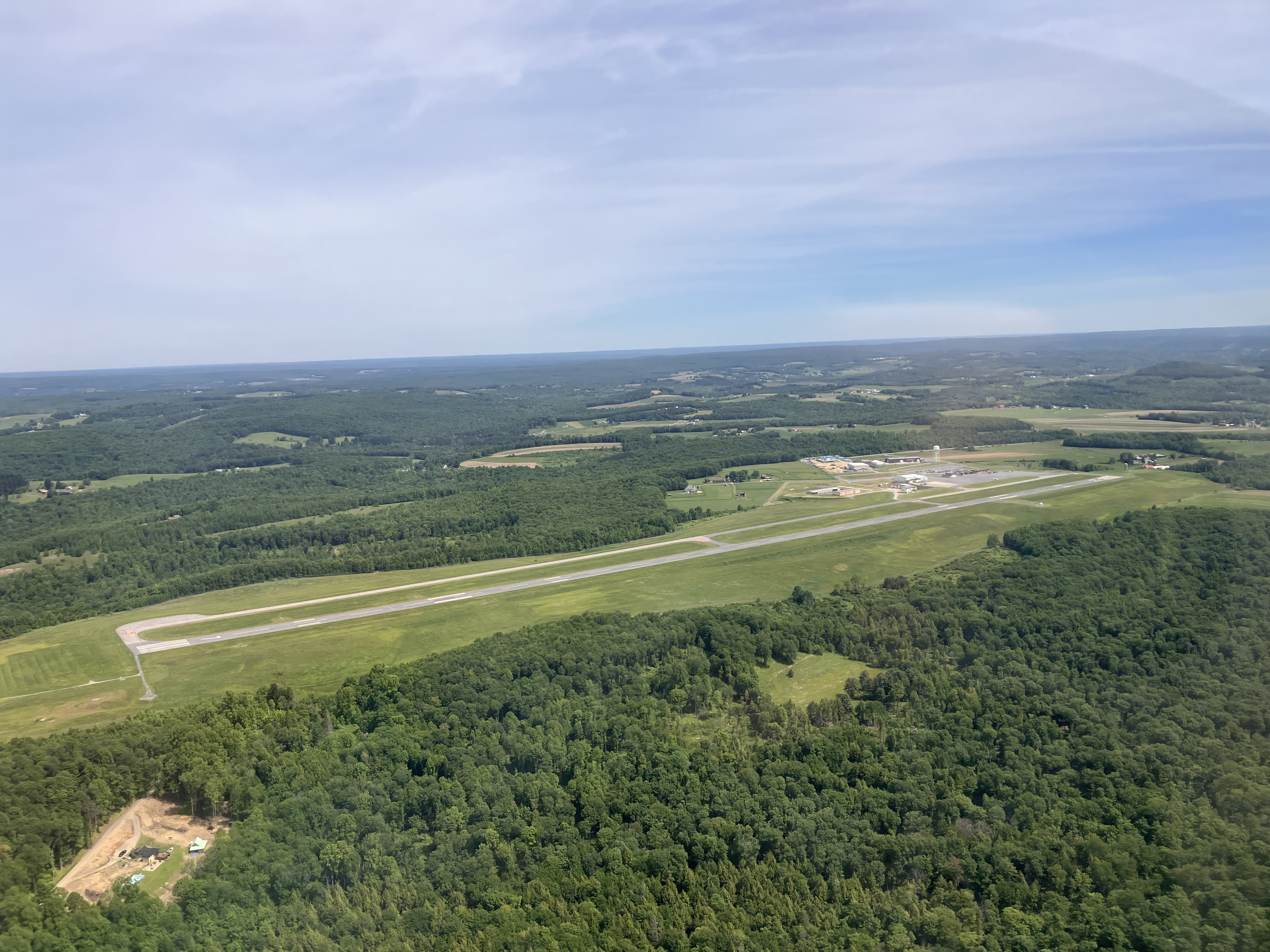
- Airport at pattern altitude
- IATA: DUJ; ICAO: KDUJ; FAA LID: DUJ

Summary
- Airport type: Public
- Owner/Operator: Clearfield-Jefferson Counties Regional Airport Authority
- Serves: DuBois, Clearfield County, Pennsylvania
- Location: Washington Township, Jefferson County, Pennsylvania
- Elevation AMSL: 1,817 ft (554 m)
- Coordinates: 41°10′42″N 078°53′55″W
- Website: http://www.duboisairport.com

Maps
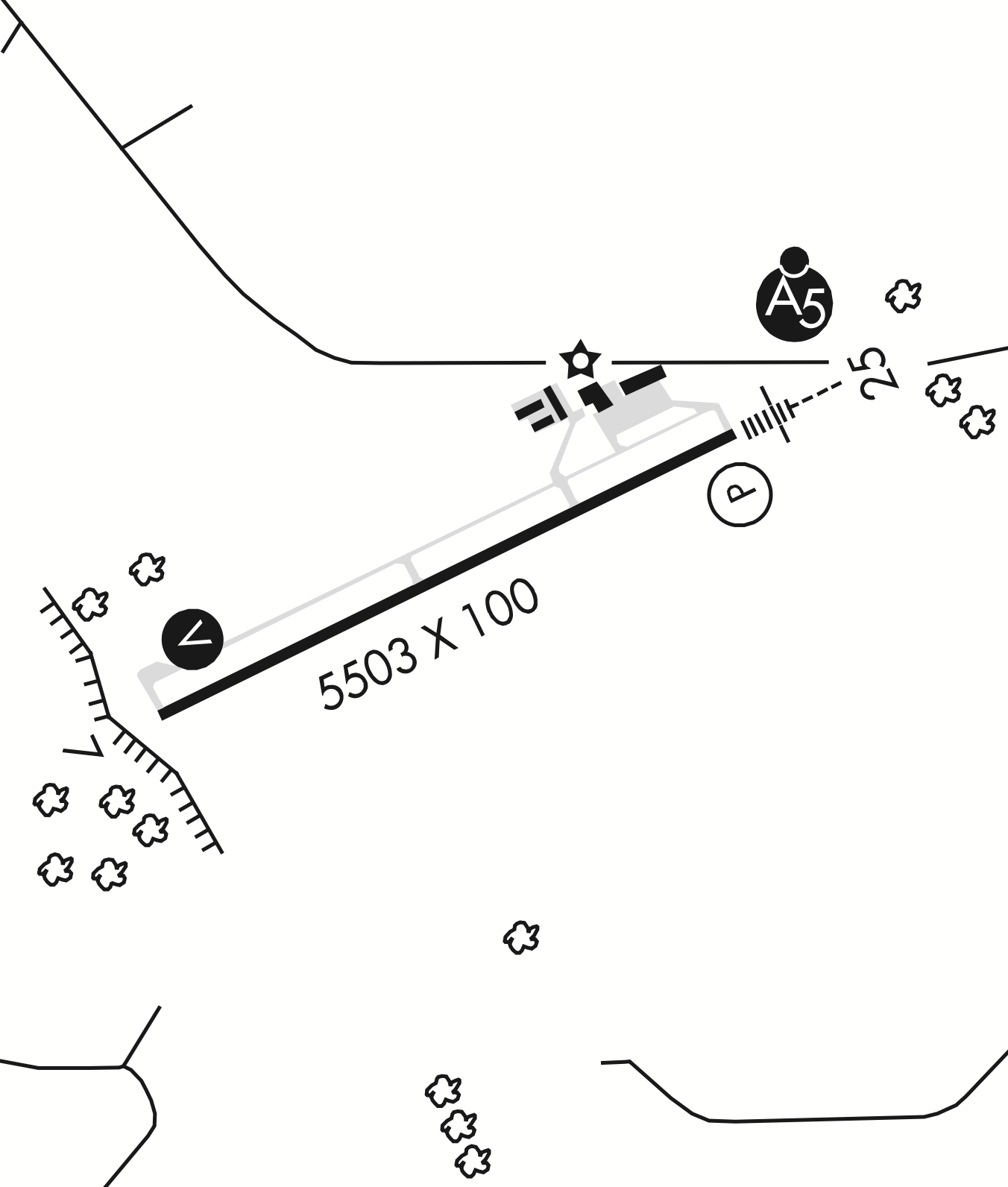
- Airport diagram

- Location within Pennsylvania Location within the United States

Runways
Direction	Length		Surface
Direction	ft	m	Surface
7/25	5,503	1,677	Asphalt

Statistics
- Aircraft operations (2021): 6,539
- Based aircraft (2022): 10
- Source: Federal Aviation Administration

DuBois Regional Airport (IATA: DUJ, ICAO: KDUJ, FAA LID: DUJ), formerly DuBois–Jefferson County Airport, is in Jefferson County, Pennsylvania, eight miles northwest of DuBois, a city in Clearfield County. The airport is in Washington Township. It is owned and operated by the Clearfield-Jefferson Counties Regional Airport Authority, based at the airport. It has scheduled service on one airline, Southern Airways Express, subsidized by the Essential Air Service program.

The National Plan of Integrated Airport Systems for 2021–2025 categorized it as a non-primary commercial service airport. DuBois Regional is a refueling stop for many aircraft due to its proximity to Interstate 80 and several air routes, as well as its on-field restaurant.

== History ==
In the early 1950s the City of DuBois created a Municipal Airport Authority which looked into expanding DuBois City Airport, in the Oklahoma section east of the city. They determined that site was unsuitable for expansion and joined with Jefferson County to procure the present site, 6 miles (9.7 km) northwest of DuBois. The first flight was made on June 1, 1960 by Allegheny Airlines (Allegheny Commuter replaced Allegheny in 1969). The runway was 4700 feet; in the 1960s and 1970s radio navigational aids were added, including a non-directional beacon, and finally an Instrument Landing System (ILS) for runway 25.

Brockway Glass Corporation, headquartered in nearby Brockway, built a hangar for their aircraft (and later a commuter airline service), and Fixed-Base Operator Beechwoods Flying Service built general aviation "T hangars", fuel pumps and maintenance hangars. The FAA opened a Flight Service Station in 1963 to provide weather and advisory service to pilots; the area is noted for rapidly changing and severe weather. In the 1970s the FAA built a regional radio navigational maintenance facility on the field.

In 1988 Brockway Glass was taken over by Owens-Illinois and its assets were liquidated, including the Crown Airways commuter airline. The Flight Service Station closed in 1990 during FSS consolidation, and its functions were assumed by the Altoona FSS.

Since 1991 the airport complex has continued to expand and renovate facilities. A better access road, part of Pennsylvania Route 830, was completed in 2007.

The airport is home to a pilot training and maintenance facility for Essential Air Service provider Southern Airways Express.

=== Runway repaving ===
In the summer of 2025, the DuBois Airport was awarded $3 million in federal funding to repave its runway and taxiway. Work will be done over a 3-day period to completely repave the runway as well as some of the taxilanes and aprons across the airport, most notably the t-hangar taxiway.

The runway was last redone in 2000. Work was delayed from the winter of 2025 to the summer of 2026 to minimize the chance of weather disruption. Work is planned for the weekend to minimize disruption to the airport's Essential Air Service carrier, Southern Airways Express, which is supportive of the plan.

== Facilities ==
The airport covers 399 acres (161 ha) at an elevation of 1,817 feet (554 m) above sea level. Its single runway, 7/25, is 5,503 by 100 feet (1,677 x 30 m).

In the year ending April 19, 2021, the airport had 6,539 aircraft operations, an average of 18 per day: 67% air taxi, 32% general aviation, and less than 1% military. In April 2022, there were 10 aircraft based at this airport: 9 single-engine and 1 multi-engine.

State grants were issued in 2021 and again in 2022 to rebuild hangars at the airport.

The airport has an aviation-themed restaurant on the field called the Flight Deck Restaurant & Lounge. $3,000 was stolen from that restaurant in late 2025. A safe containing money and documents was stolen, and damage was done to other airport facilities.

== Airline and destinations ==
The airport is served through the Essential Air Service program. Southern Airways Express, which has served the airport since 2016, has been credited with making service improvements that attracted enough passengers to reinstate the airport's qualification.

Southern offers 19 weekly departures each to both Pittsburgh and Washington, D.C. Its four-year contract was last renewed in 2024, when it was one of four companies to bid. Flights to Washington went into the Baltimore/Washington International Airport until 2021, at which time service switched to the Dulles International Airport to support a new interline agreement with United Airlines.

Scheduled passenger service:

Airlines	Destinations	Refs
Contour Airlines	Atlanta, Chicago–O'Hare (both begin February 1, 2027)	
Southern Airways Express	Pittsburgh, Washington–Dulles (both end January 31, 2027)	

== Statistics ==
Top domestic destinations from DUJ (January - December 2025)
Rank	City	Passengers	Carrier
1	Pittsburgh, Pennsylvania	2,290	Southern Airways Express
2	Washington-Dulles, Virginia	1,960	Southern Airways Express

Passenger boardings (enplanements) by year, as per the FAA
Year	2008	2009	2010	2011	2012	2013	2014	2015	2016	2017	2018	2019	2020	2021	2022
Enplanements	3,230	5,096	5,728	5,986	5,074	5,099	4,081	3,215	2,934	3,888	5,448	5,835	2,451	4,561	6,200
Change	▼55.08%	▲57.77%	▲12.40%	▲4.50%	▼15.24%	▲0.49%	▼19.96%	▼21.22%	▼8.74%	▲32.52%	▲40.12%	▲7.10%	▼-57.99%	▲86.09%	▲35.94%
Airline	Gulfstream International Airlines dba Continental Connection	Gulfstream International Airlines dba Continental Connection	Gulfstream International Airlines dba Continental Connection	Silver Airways dba United Express	Silver Airways dba United Express	Silver Airways dba United Express	Silver Airways dba United Express	Silver Airways	Silver Airways	Southern Airways Express	Southern Airways Express	Southern Airways Express	Southern Airways Express	Southern Airways Express	Southern Airways Express
Destination(s)	Cleveland	Cleveland	Cleveland Franklin	Cleveland Franklin	Cleveland Franklin	Cleveland Franklin	Cleveland Franklin	Johnstown Washington-Dulles	Johnstown Washington-Dulles	Baltimore Pittsburgh	Baltimore Pittsburgh	Baltimore Pittsburgh	Baltimore Pittsburgh	Baltimore Pittsburgh Washington-Dulles	Pittsburgh Washington-Dulles

== Incidents ==
Date	Flight Number	Information
October 4, 1970	-	NASCAR driver Curtis Turner and golfer Clarence King were killed shortly after takeoff in an Aero Commander 500.
March 27, 1975	-	A Douglas C-48A N6 of the Federal Aviation Administration crashed on take-off on an executive flight to Harrisburg International Airport. All eleven people on board survived.
April 9, 2003	-	Skyway Enterprises Shorts 330-200 aircraft (N805SW), on a flight from Pittsburgh was about to land at DuBois Regional Airport, when an engine surged, the pilot attempted to go round again to land and crashed left of the runway. The aircraft was substantially damaged but the two crew survived.

== See also ==
- List of airports in Pennsylvania

== Other sources ==
- Essential Air Service documents (Docket OST-2004-17617) from the U.S. Department of Transportation:
  - Order 2004-8-18 (August 16, 2004): selecting Mesa Air Group, Inc. subsidiary, Air Midwest, Inc., d/b/a US Airways Express, to provide essential air service (EAS) at DuBois, Pennsylvania, for the period from July 23, 2004, through August 31, 2006, at an annual subsidy rate of $643,818.
  - Order 2006-6-31 (June 26, 2006): re-selecting Mesa Air Group, Inc. d/b/a Air Midwest, to provide essential air service (EAS) at DuBois, Pennsylvania, for the two-year period beginning August 1, 2006, at an annual subsidy rate of $599,271.
  - Order 2007-7-21 (July 26, 2007): selecting Gulfstream International Airlines, Inc. to provide subsidized essential air service (EAS) at DuBois and Franklin/Oil City, Pennsylvania, Greenbrier/White Sulphur Springs/Lewisburg, West Virginia, and Athens, Georgia, at a total annual subsidy rate of $4,077,792 ($1,159,229 for DuBois, $763,741 for Franklin/Oil City, $1,329,477 for Greenbrier/White Sulphur Springs/Lewisburg, and $825,345 for Athens) for the two-year period beginning when Gulfstream inaugurates service through the end of the 24th month thereafter.
  - Order 2008-5-3 (May 6, 2008): selecting Gulfstream International Airlines, Inc. to provide subsidized essential air service (EAS) at DuBois and Franklin/Oil City, Pennsylvania, and Greenbrier/White Sulphur Springs/Lewisburg (Lewisburg), West Virginia, at a total annual subsidy rate of $5,577,594 ($2,020,095 for DuBois, $1,226,773 for Franklin/Oil City, and $2,330,725 for Lewisburg) for the two-year period beginning when Gulfstream inaugurates service through the end of the 24th month thereafter.
  - Order 2010-9-12 (September 9, 2010): re-selecting Gulfstream International Airlines to provide essential air service (EAS) at Bradford, DuBois, and Oil City/Franklin, Pennsylvania, and Jamestown, New York, for a combined annual subsidy of $5,870,657 ($1,087,306 for Bradford, $2,228,996 for DuBois, $915,101 for Oil City/Franklin, and $1,639,254 for Jamestown), from October 1, 2010, through September 30, 2012.
  - Order 2012-9-23 (September 27, 2012): selecting Silver Airways to provide Essential Air Service (EAS) at Bradford, DuBois, Franklin/Oil City, Pennsylvania, Jamestown, New York, and Parkersburg, West Virginia/Marietta, Ohio, for a combined annual subsidy of $10,348,117 ($1,940,272 for Bradford; $2,587,029 for DuBois, $1,293,515 for Franklin, $1,940,272 for Jamestown, and $2,587,029 for Parkersburg), from October 1, 2012, through September 30, 2014.
  - Notice of Intent (February 14, 2014): of Silver Airways Corp. to discontinue scheduled air service between Cleveland, Ohio (CLE) and: Jamestown, New York (JHW), Bradford, Pennsylvania (BFD), DuBois, Pennsylvania (DUJ), Franklin/Oil City, Pennsylvania (FKL), and Parkersburg, West Virginia/Marietta, Ohio (PKB).
