= Nate Byham =

American football player (born 1988)

Stanford Cardinal
- Title: Tight ends coach

Personal information
- Born: June 27, 1988 (age 38); Franklin, Pennsylvania, U.S.
- Listed height: 6 ft 4 in (1.93 m)
- Listed weight: 264 lb (120 kg)

Career information
- High school: Franklin (PA)
- College: Pittsburgh
- NFL draft: 2010: 6th round, 182nd overall pick

Career history

Playing
- San Francisco 49ers (2010−2011); Tampa Bay Buccaneers (2012−2013); New England Patriots (2014)*
- * Offseason or practice squad member only

Coaching
- Albany (2015–2021) Tight ends coach & run game coordinator; Albany (2022) Associate head coach, co-offensive coordinator, & offensive line coach; Stanford (2023–2024) Tight ends coach; Stanford (2025) Offensive coordinator & tight ends coach; Stanford (2026–present) Tight ends coach

Awards and highlights
- First-team All-Big East (2008)

Career NFL statistics
- Receptions: 11
- Receiving yards: 83
- Receiving touchdowns: 1
- Stats at Pro Football Reference

Nathan Arthur Byham (born June 27, 1988) is an American college football coach and former tight end. He is the tight ends coach for Stanford University, a position he has held since 2026. He played collegiate football at the University of Pittsburgh. Byham was regarded as one of the best blocking tight end prospects for the 2010 NFL draft. He was selected by the San Francisco 49ers in the sixth round.

== Professional career ==
Byham was selected by the San Francisco 49ers in the sixth round of the 2010 NFL draft with the 182nd overall pick.

Pre-draft measurables
Height	Weight	Arm length	Hand span	40-yard dash	Vertical jump	Broad jump
6 ft 4 in (1.93 m)	268 lb (122 kg)	33.5 in (0.85 m)	10 in (0.25 m)	5.04 s	29 in (0.74 m)	9 ft 0 in (2.74 m)
All values from NFL combine
