= Franklin, Pennsylvania =

City in Pennsylvania, US

- City
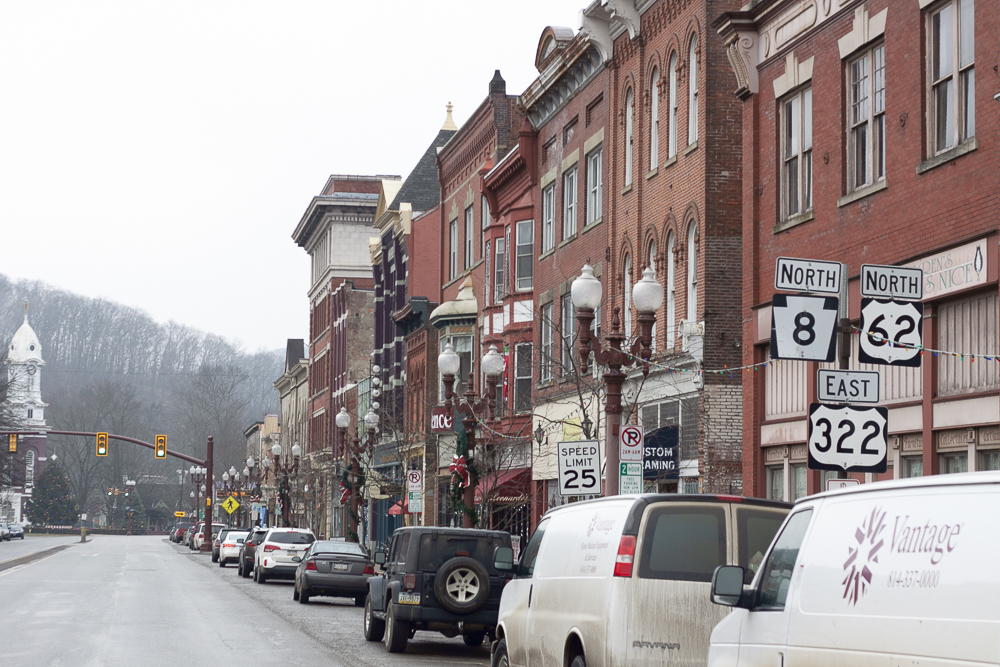
- Downtown Franklin

- Flag
- Nickname: The Victorian City
- Location in Venango County, Pennsylvania

- Location within Pennsylvania Location within the United States
- Coordinates: 41°23′52″N 79°49′53″W
- Country: United States
- State: Pennsylvania
- County: Venango
- Settled: 1740s
- Platted: 1795
- Incorporated (borough): 1828
- Incorporated (city): 1868
- Named for: Benjamin Franklin

Government
  - Mayor: Doug Baker

Area
  - Total: 4.80 sq mi (12.44 km^{2})
  - Land: 4.68 sq mi (12.11 km^{2})
  - Water: 0.13 sq mi (0.33 km^{2}) 1.70%

Population (2020)
  - Total: 6,077
  - Density: 1,299.3/sq mi (501.67/km^{2})
  - Demonym: Franklinite
- Time zone: UTC−5 (EST)
  - Summer (DST): UTC−4 (EDT)
- ZIP Code: 16323
- FIPS code: 42-27456
- Website: franklinpa.gov

Franklin is a city in and the county seat of Venango County, Pennsylvania, United States, located at the confluence of French Creek and the Allegheny River. The population was 6,077 in the 2020 census. Franklin is part of the Oil City micropolitan area. It is known for its three-day autumn festival in October, Applefest, which attracts hundreds of thousands of visitors.

== History ==
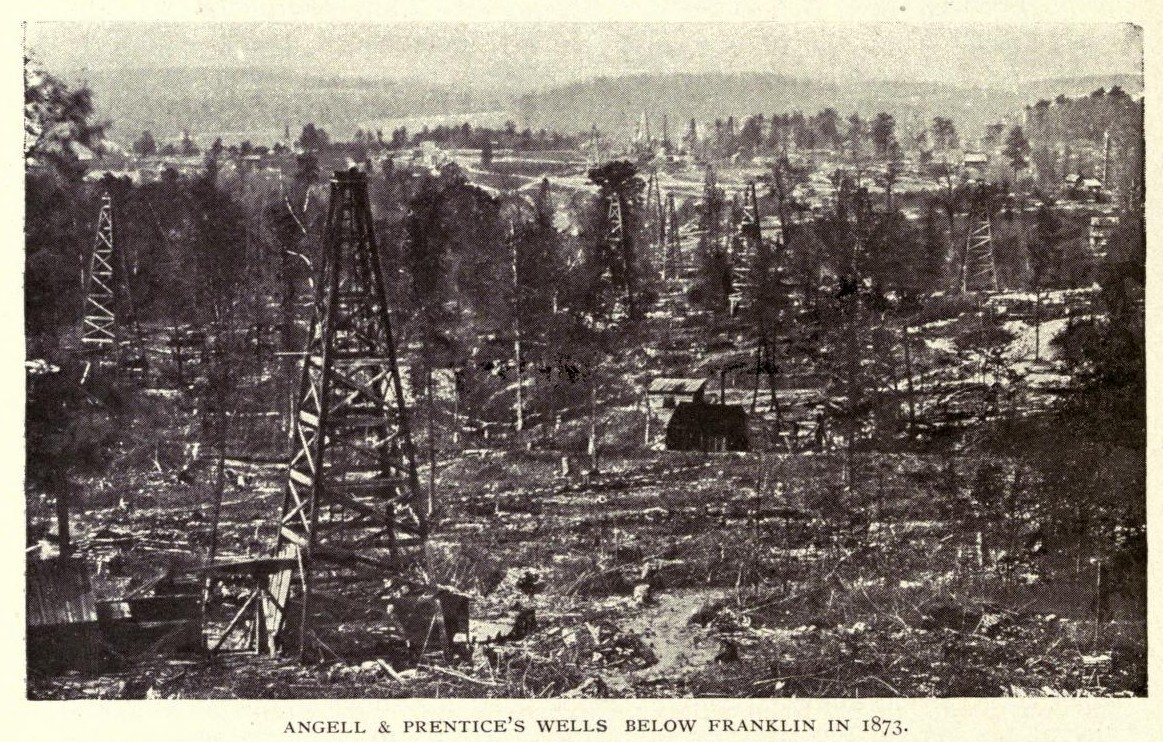
Oil wells near Franklin in 1873

Franklin is located at the confluence of French Creek and the Allegheny River, an important site used for centuries by Native Americans. They had long before developed what became known as the Venango Path, passing from the head of French Creek north to Presque Isle Bay on Lake Erie. Via French Creek and the Allegheny River, the portage effectively linked the waterways of the Ohio River and the Great Lakes.

In 1740, Scottish fur trader John Fraser built a trading post here at Venango, the Lenape village. The French also had designs on this region.

They wanted to link their colonies of New France (Quebec) north of the Great Lakes, in Illinois Country (accessible via the Ohio River), and La Louisiane, on the lower Mississippi River. As tensions increased between France and Great Britain prior to the onset of the French and Indian War (as the North American front of the Seven Years' War was called), the French constructed four forts to control their continued access to the Venango Path and these important waterways. From north to south they were Fort Presque Isle, Fort Le Boeuf (at the south end of the portage and head of French Creek), Fort Machault, and Fort Duquesne, at the Forks of the Ohio.

In December 1753, George Washington, then a 21-year-old major in the Virginia militia, was sent to Fort Le Boeuf to warn the French that they were trespassing on British land and should leave. Although providing respite to Washington and his party, the fort commander gave him a letter suggesting that the Governor of Virginia should instead deliver his message to the French commander in Quebec, New France.

The French maintained this and their other three forts, including at Fort Machault until July 1759, when they surrendered Fort Niagara to the British. At that time, the commander of Fort Presque Isle sent orders to the commanders of Fort Le Boeuf and Fort Machault to abandon their positions and return north. Before leaving, the French troops burned both of these forts to the ground to prevent their use by the British.

In 1760, the British erected Fort Venango here, replacing Fort Marchault. In 1763, Native Americans allied with the French killed many British. The British colonists had repeatedly attacked even neutral tribes, such as the Lenape, who then mostly allied with the French. After the war, the British Americans constructed Fort Franklin here, named after Benjamin Franklin.

In 1787 Andrew Ellicott, who surveyed Washington, D.C., was hired to lay out the town of Franklin, which had developed around the fort. It became a trading center for a largely rural, agricultural region. Once oil was discovered in the late 19th century in nearby Titusville, Franklin became a booming oil town. After other fields were discovered in Texas and Oklahoma, and oil companies moved west, Franklin developed an industry of machinery companies.

== Geography ==
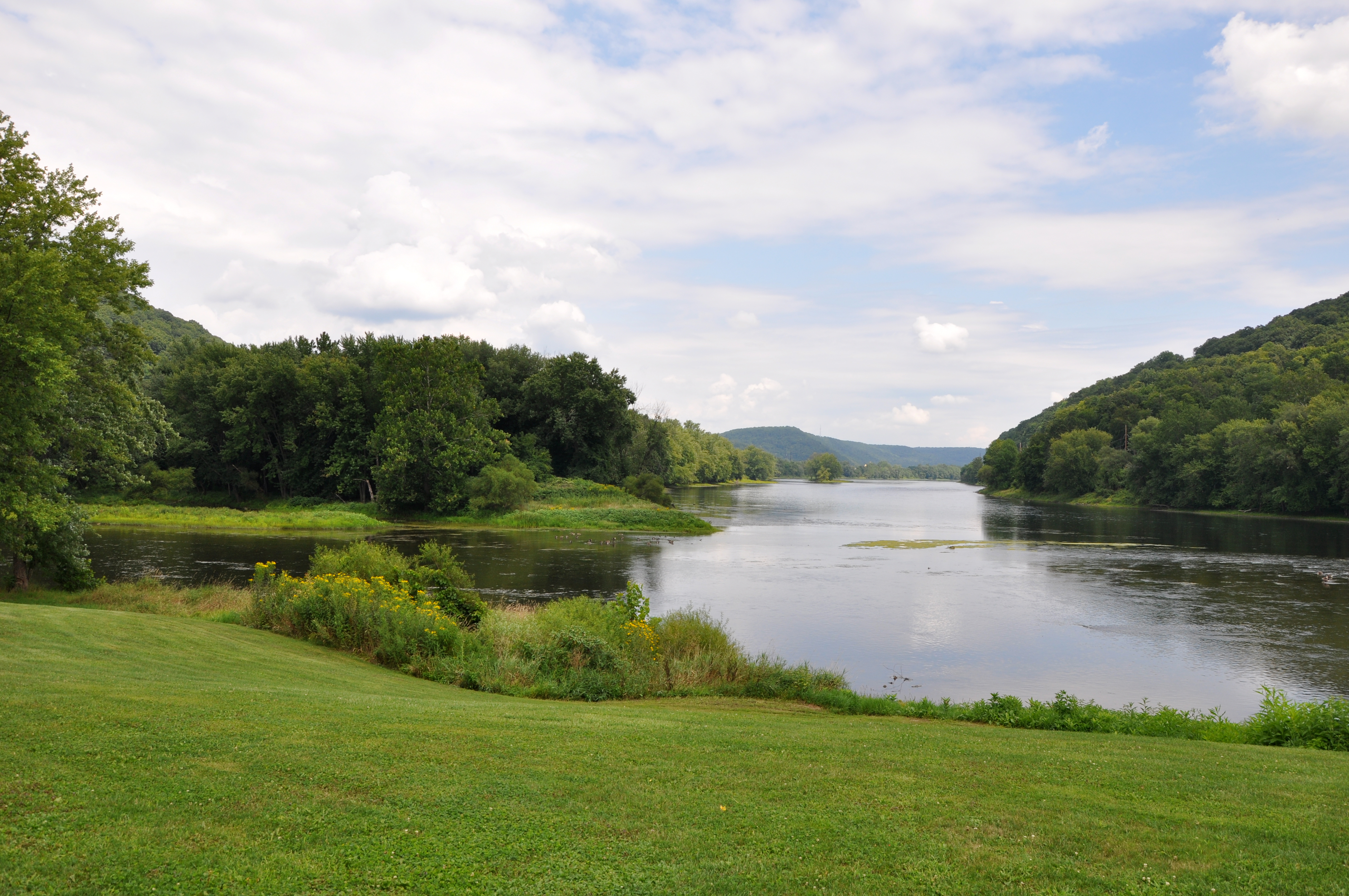
Confluence of French Creek and the Allegheny River in Franklin

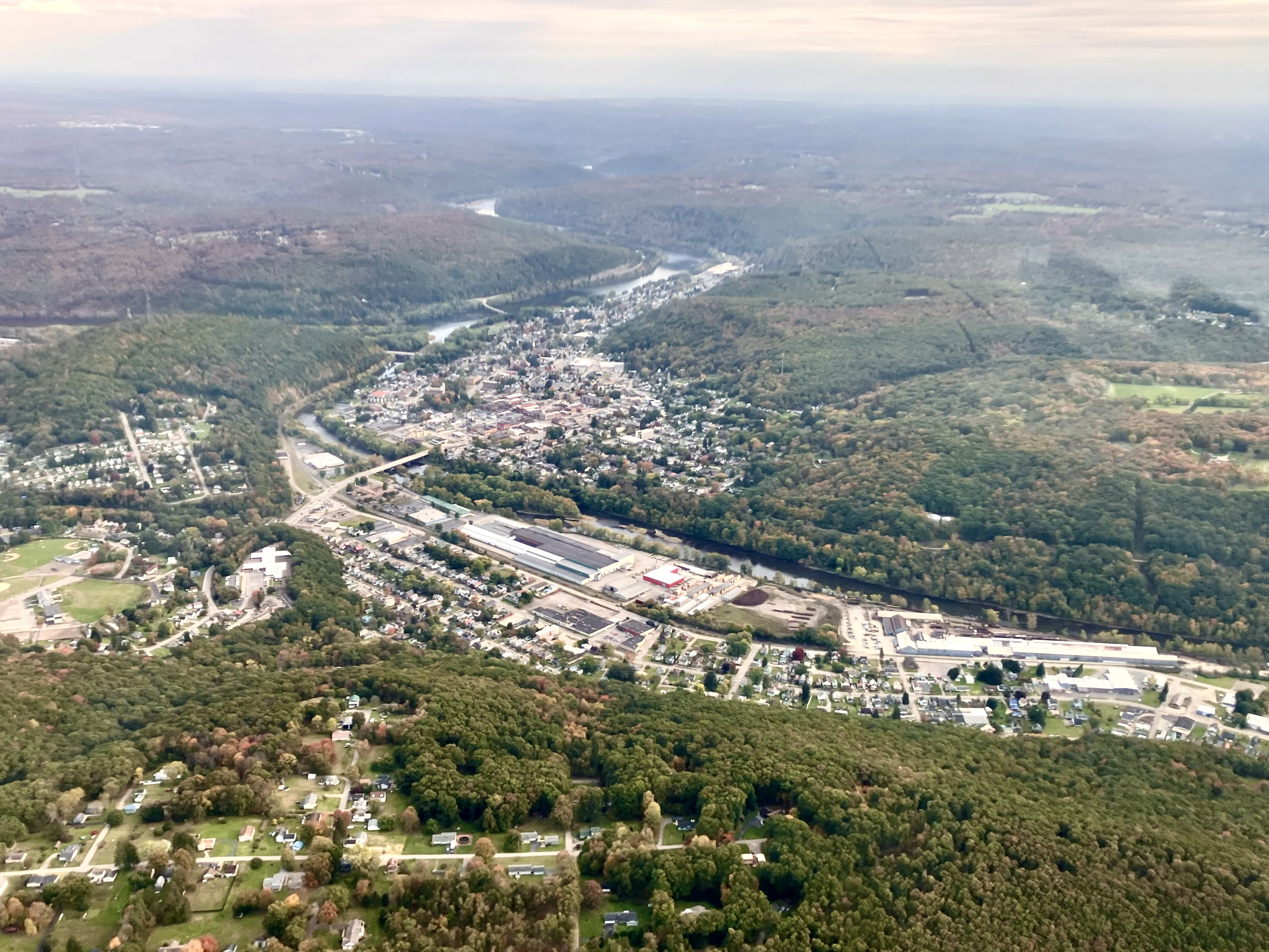
Franklin from the air

=== Climate ===
Climate data for Franklin, Pennsylvania (1991–2020 normals, extremes 1897–present)
Month	Jan	Feb	Mar	Apr	May	Jun	Jul	Aug	Sep	Oct	Nov	Dec	Year
Record high °F (°C)	73 (23)	74 (23)	90 (32)	93 (34)	97 (36)	101 (38)	106 (41)	104 (40)	100 (38)	90 (32)	81 (27)	74 (23)	106 (41)
Mean daily maximum °F (°C)	33.7 (0.9)	36.3 (2.4)	45.6 (7.6)	59.7 (15.4)	70.9 (21.6)	78.7 (25.9)	82.7 (28.2)	81.2 (27.3)	74.2 (23.4)	61.4 (16.3)	49.0 (9.4)	38.1 (3.4)	59.3 (15.2)
Daily mean °F (°C)	26.0 (−3.3)	27.5 (−2.5)	35.5 (1.9)	47.4 (8.6)	58.5 (14.7)	67.1 (19.5)	71.1 (21.7)	69.8 (21.0)	62.9 (17.2)	51.1 (10.6)	40.3 (4.6)	31.2 (−0.4)	49.0 (9.4)
Mean daily minimum °F (°C)	18.3 (−7.6)	18.7 (−7.4)	25.4 (−3.7)	35.2 (1.8)	46.1 (7.8)	55.5 (13.1)	59.6 (15.3)	58.3 (14.6)	51.7 (10.9)	40.8 (4.9)	31.7 (−0.2)	24.3 (−4.3)	38.8 (3.8)
Record low °F (°C)	−30 (−34)	−27 (−33)	−22 (−30)	0 (−18)	20 (−7)	28 (−2)	33 (1)	36 (2)	23 (−5)	15 (−9)	0 (−18)	−14 (−26)	−30 (−34)
Average precipitation inches (mm)	3.27 (83)	2.66 (68)	3.36 (85)	4.15 (105)	4.00 (102)	4.86 (123)	5.32 (135)	4.24 (108)	3.94 (100)	3.76 (96)	3.41 (87)	3.36 (85)	46.33 (1,177)
Average snowfall inches (cm)	17.9 (45)	11.5 (29)	8.9 (23)	1.1 (2.8)	0.0 (0.0)	0.0 (0.0)	0.0 (0.0)	0.0 (0.0)	0.0 (0.0)	0.0 (0.0)	2.6 (6.6)	11.7 (30)	53.7 (136)
Average precipitation days (≥ 0.01 in)	17.9	14.7	14.2	14.3	14.5	13.6	12.3	11.6	11.2	14.9	14.1	16.9	170.2
Average snowy days (≥ 0.1 in)	9.4	7.5	4.2	0.6	0.0	0.0	0.0	0.0	0.0	0.0	1.9	6.0	29.6
Source: NOAA

== Demographics ==
Historical population
Census	Pop.	Note	%±
1810	159		—
1820	252		58.5%
1830	410		62.7%
1840	595		45.1%
1850	936		57.3%
1860	1,303		39.2%
1870	3,876		197.5%
1880	5,010		29.3%
1890	5,827		16.3%
1900	7,167		23.0%
1910	9,767		36.3%
1920	9,970		2.1%
1930	10,254		2.8%
1940	10,187		−0.7%
1950	10,006		−1.8%
1960	9,586		−4.2%
1970	9,127		−4.8%
1980	8,643		−5.3%
1990	7,926		−8.3%
2000	7,156		−9.7%
2010	6,545		−8.5%
2020	6,077		−7.2%

=== 2020 census ===
As of the 2020 census, Franklin had a population of 6,077. The median age was 44.6 years. 20.9% of residents were under the age of 18 and 23.8% of residents were 65 years of age or older. For every 100 females there were 88.6 males, and for every 100 females age 18 and over there were 85.9 males age 18 and over.

100.0% of residents lived in urban areas, while 0.0% lived in rural areas.

There were 2,785 households in Franklin, of which 24.1% had children under the age of 18 living in them. Of all households, 34.7% were married-couple households, 21.2% were households with a male householder and no spouse or partner present, and 36.8% were households with a female householder and no spouse or partner present. About 40.8% of all households were made up of individuals and 19.1% had someone living alone who was 65 years of age or older.

There were 3,146 housing units, of which 11.5% were vacant. The homeowner vacancy rate was 3.5% and the rental vacancy rate was 7.8%.

Racial composition as of the 2020 census
Race	Number	Percent
White	5,438	89.5%
Black or African American	128	2.1%
American Indian and Alaska Native	9	0.1%
Asian	50	0.8%
Native Hawaiian and Other Pacific Islander	1	0.0%
Some other race	28	0.5%
Two or more races	423	7.0%
Hispanic or Latino (of any race)	101	1.7%

=== Income and poverty ===
The median income for a household in the city was $23,818, and the median income for a family was $34,718. Males had a median income of $32,912 versus $21,178 for females. The per capita income for the city was $15,234. About 13.6% of families and 17.3% of the population were below the poverty line, including 25.4% of those under age 18 and 14.4% of those age 65 or over.

== Arts and culture ==
Franklin is home to the DeBence Antique Music World, a museum whose collection contains more than 100 antique mechanical musical instruments.

== Sports ==
In 1903, the city was the home of the Franklin Athletic Club, one of the earliest professional football teams. That season, the team was unofficially recognized as the "US Football Champions" and later won the 1903 World Series of Football, held that December at Madison Square Garden. The team included several of the era's top players, such as: Herman Kerkhoff, Arthur McFarland, Clark Schrontz, Paul Steinberg, Pop Sweet, Eddie Wood, and coach Blondy Wallace.

Among other sporting accomplishments, Franklin Area High School has won two state basketball championships. In 2001 and 2006, the boys team, playing in PIAA Class AAA District 10, defeated Allentown Central Catholic out of District 11 and Communications Tech from District 12 (Philadelphia Public League), respectively.

== Education ==
The Franklin Area School District currently has one high school, one middle school, and three elementary schools (Central Elementary, Sandycreek Elementary, and Victory Elementary) located throughout the area with an estimated 2278 students.

The Valley Grove School District currently has one high school and one elementary school located in the Franklin area with an estimated 1026 students. It formerly consisted of one high school, one middle school and two elementary schools, but a consolidation and rebuilding project converted the middle school into a single elementary school that reopened in 2007.

== Transportation ==
Franklin is served by the Venango Regional Airport.

== Notable people ==
- Timothy A. Barrow (January 1, 1934 – March 16, 2019), Arizona businessman and politician
- John Wilkes Booth (May 10, 1838 – April 26, 1865), Abraham Lincoln's assassin. In 1863, he formed an oil company in Franklin and resided there while performing at the Franklin Opera House.
- Nate Byham (born June 27, 1988), NFL tight end formerly of the San Francisco 49ers
- Kid Butler, MLB player
- Richard Frame, politician
- Jack Fultz (born August 27, 1948), winner of the 1976 Boston Marathon.
- Alexander Hays (July 8, 1819 – May 5, 1864), USMA graduate and Union general during the Civil War. Meritorious service at Gettysburg. Killed at the Battle of the Wilderness
- Samuel Hays (1783–1868), U.S. Congressman
- Nate Karns (born November 25, 1987), MLB pitcher for the Baltimore Orioles
- Judge Robert Lamberton (March 20, 1809 – August 7, 1885), associate judge of the Courts of Venango County, Pennsylvania and founder of the Lamberton Savings Bank
- Rolland Lawrence (born March 24, 1951), NFL cornerback for the Atlanta Falcons
- Hildegarde Dolson Lockridge (1908–1981), author of mysteries and histories, including We Shook the Family Tree
- Ted Marchibroda (March 15, 1931 – January 16, 2016), NFL quarterback and head coach in the National Football League
- Alexander McDowell (March 4, 1845 – September 30, 1913), member of the United States House of Representatives
- Charles Miller (June 15, 1843 – December 21, 1927), businessman and commander of the Pennsylvania National Guard Division.
- Jesse L. Reno (April 20, 1823 – September 14, 1862), United States Army major general; Killed at the Battle of South Mountain
- George C. Rickards (August 25, 1860 – January 15, 1933), major general in the United States Army and Chief of the National Guard Bureau
- Sean W. Rowe (born 1975), Bishop of the Episcopal Diocese of Northwestern Pennsylvania
- Frank Saddler, (9 September 1864 –25 March 1921) Broadway orchestrator and music arranger; born in Franklin
- Joseph C. Sibley an American livestock breeder, farmer, and politician who represented northwestern Pennsylvania in the United States House of Representatives for five terms.
- Bill Slocum, politician
- George R. Snowden (February 12, 1841 – April 21, 1932), major general in the Pennsylvania National Guard and commander of the Pennsylvania National Guard Division
- Mary Jo White (born 1941), Pennsylvania state senator
- John A. Wiley (September 3, 1843 – December 28, 1909), National Guard major general who commanded the 28th Infantry Division
- Howard Zahniser (February 25, 1906 – May 5, 1964), environmental activist who authored the Wilderness Act
