= Franklin Area School District =

School district in Pennsylvania

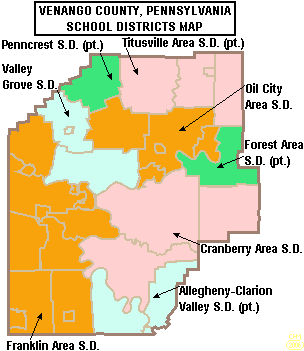

Address
- 40 Knights Way Franklin, Pennsylvania, 16323; United States

District information
- Type: Public

Other information
- Website: http://www.fasd.k12.pa.us

Franklin Area School District (FASD) is a rural, public school system headquartered in Franklin, Venango County, located in western Pennsylvania. Franklin Area School District encompasses approximately 186 square miles. It serves the residents of: Canal Township, Clinton Township, Frenchcreek Township, Irwin Township, Mineral Township, Sandycreek Township, Victory Township, along with the boroughs of: Barkeyville, Clintonville, Polk and Utica. According to 2000 federal census data, it serves a resident population of 16,598. In 2009, Franklin Area School District residents’ per capita income was $17,008, while the median family income was $39,801. In the Commonwealth, the median family income was $49,501 and the United States median family income was $49,445, in 2010.

The district operates a Jr. Sr. High School (7th through 12th grades ), and three elementary schools (K-6th grade).

== Extracurriculars ==
The district offers a wide variety of clubs, activities and sports. These programs begin with elementary children and extend through high school athletics. The district employs an athletic director and 2 assistant directors, along with over 40 coaches and assistants to provide the athletics program. Weightlifting is available to students year round. There is also an elementary basketball program which is open to both boys and girls.

The district offers other sports through a cooperative agreement, with neighboring Valley Grove School District. These sports include: football, tennis, volleyball, soccer, track (Boys & Girls), and wrestling. Students pay a $25 fee (2010) to participate in these cooperative sports.

Additionally, the marching band program is in cooperation with Valley Grove School District.

Franklin Area High School has won two state basketball championships. In 2001 and 2006, the boys team, playing in PIAA class AAA district 10, defeated Allentown Central Catholic and Communications Tech (Philadelphia), respectively.
