= Venango County, Pennsylvania =

County in Pennsylvania, United States

- County
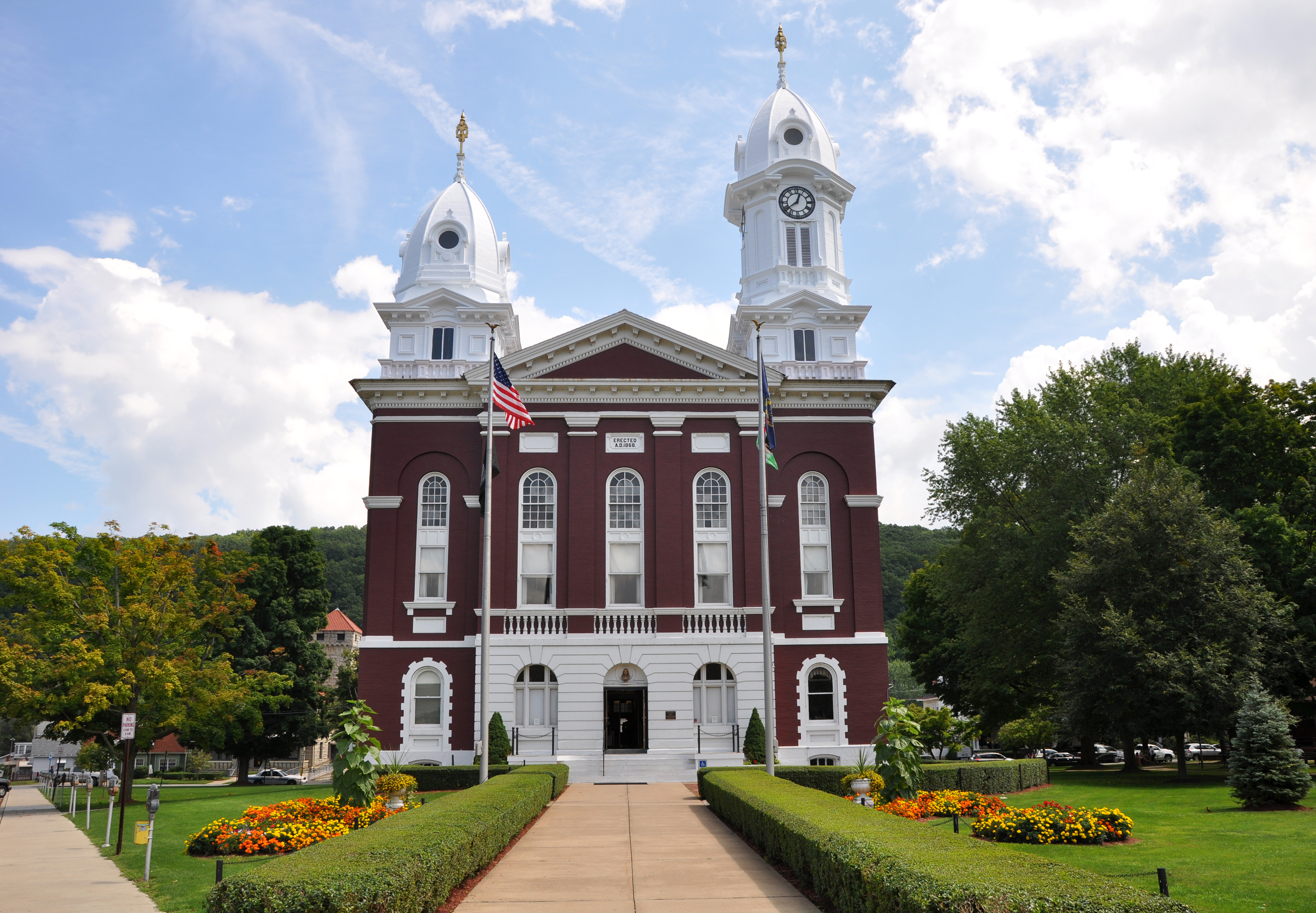
- Venango County Courthouse

- Seal

- Location within the U.S. state of Pennsylvania
- Coordinates: 41°24′N 79°46′W
- Country: United States
- State: Pennsylvania
- Founded: September 1, 1805
- Named for: Native American word for otter
- Seat: Franklin
- Largest city: Oil City

Government
  - Commissioners: Samuel H Breene

Area
  - Total: 683 sq mi (1,770 km^{2})
  - Land: 674 sq mi (1,750 km^{2})
  - Water: 8.6 sq mi (22 km^{2}) 1.3%

Population (2020)
  - Total: 50,454
  - Estimate (2025): 49,346 ▼
  - Density: 75/sq mi (29/km^{2})
- Time zone: UTC−5 (Eastern)
  - Summer (DST): UTC−4 (EDT)
- Congressional districts: 15th, 16th
- Website: www.venangocountypa.gov

Venango County is a county in the Commonwealth of Pennsylvania. As of the 2020 census, the population was 50,454. Its county seat is Franklin. The county was created in 1800 and later organized in 1805. The county is part of the Northwest Pennsylvania region of the state. (Note: Includes Erie, Mercer, Crawford and Venango Counties)

Venango County comprises the Oil City, PA micropolitan statistical area. It is part of the Pittsburgh and Erie media markets (with Erie channels available to Comcast subscribers in the area).

== History ==
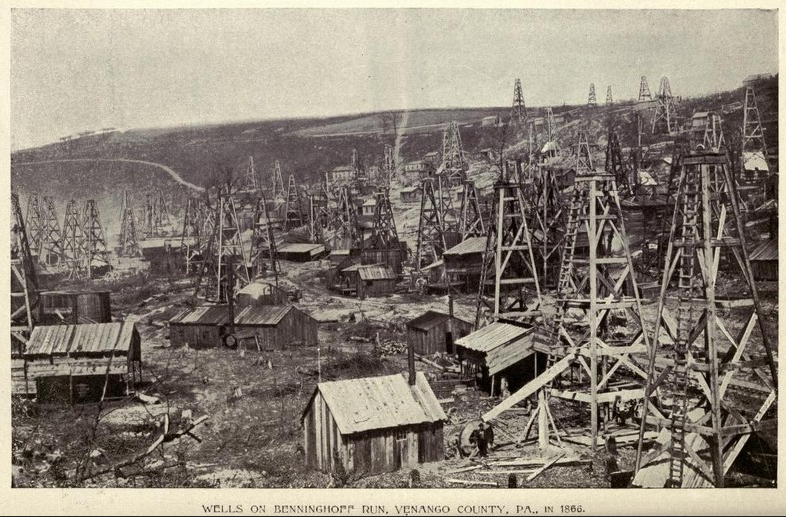
Wells along Benninghoff Run in 1866

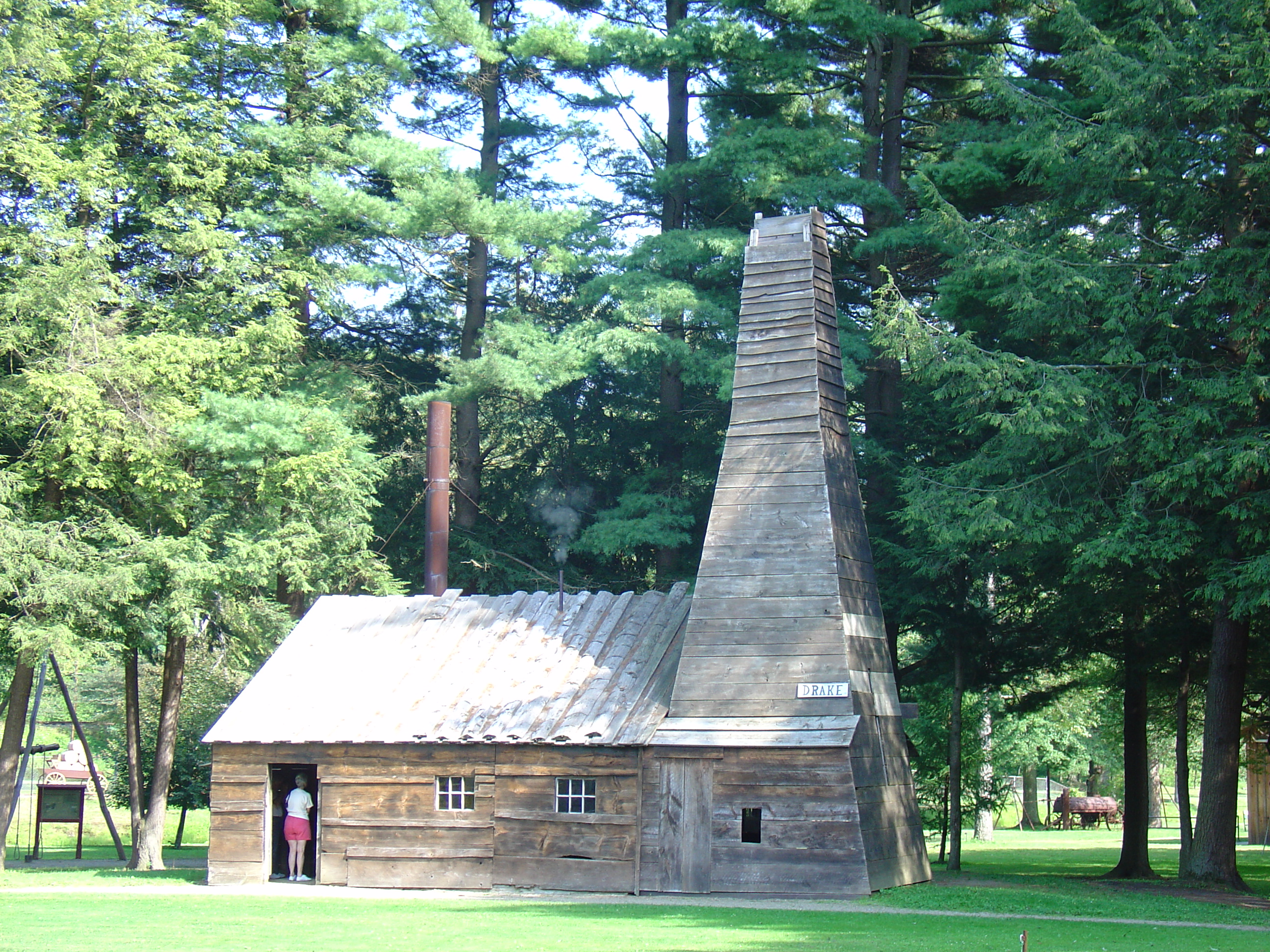
Drake Well Museum in Cherrytree Township

Venango County was created on March 12, 1800, from parts of Allegheny and Lycoming Counties. The name "Venango" is derived from the Native American name of the region, Onenge, meaning Otter. This was corrupted in English as the Venango River. The settlement at its mouth was likewise called Venango, which since March 3, 1871, has been the South Side of Oil City. Venango County was home to an oil boom in the years following discovery of natural oil (petroleum) in the mid-1850s.

George Bissell, a Yale University chemistry professor, and Edwin L. Drake, a former railroad conductor, made the first successful use of a drilling rig on August 28, 1859, near Titusville. (Although Titusville is in Crawford County, the first oil well was drilled outside of town, less than a mile inside of the Venango County boundary) This single well soon exceeded the entire cumulative oil output of Europe since the 1650s. Within weeks, oil derricks were erected all over the area. Other oil boom towns located in Venango County included Franklin, Oil City, and the now defunct Pithole City. The principal product of the oil was kerosene.

McClintocksville was a small community in Cornplanter Township in Venango County. In 1861, it was the location of Wamsutta Oil Refinery, the first business venture of Henry Huttleston Rogers, who became a leading United States capitalist, businessman, industrialist, financier, and philanthropist. Rogers and his young wife Abbie Palmer Gifford Rogers lived in a one-room shack there along Oil Creek for several years beginning in 1862.

After joining Standard Oil, Rogers invested heavily in various industries, including copper, steel, mining, and railways. The Virginian Railway is widely considered his final life's achievement. Rogers amassed a great fortune, estimated at over $100 million, and became one of the wealthiest men in the United States. He was also a generous philanthropist, providing many public works for his hometown of Fairhaven, Massachusetts, and financially assisting helping such notables as Mark Twain, Helen Keller, and Dr. Booker T. Washington.

A little girl named Ida M. Tarbell, whose father was an independent producer whose small business was ruined by the South Improvement Company scheme of 1871 and the conglomerate which became Standard Oil. Introduced to each other in 1902 by their mutual friend Twain, Tarbell, who had become an investigative journalist and Rogers, who knew of her work, shared meetings and information over a two-year period which led to her epoch work, The History of the Standard Oil Company, published in 1904, which many historians feel helped fuel public sentiment against the giant company and helped lead to the court-ordered break-up of it in 1911.

The oil heritage of Venango County is commemorated by a Pennsylvania State Park and many heritage sites which help tell the story and memorialize the people of the oil boom of the late 19th and early 20th centuries.

== Geography ==
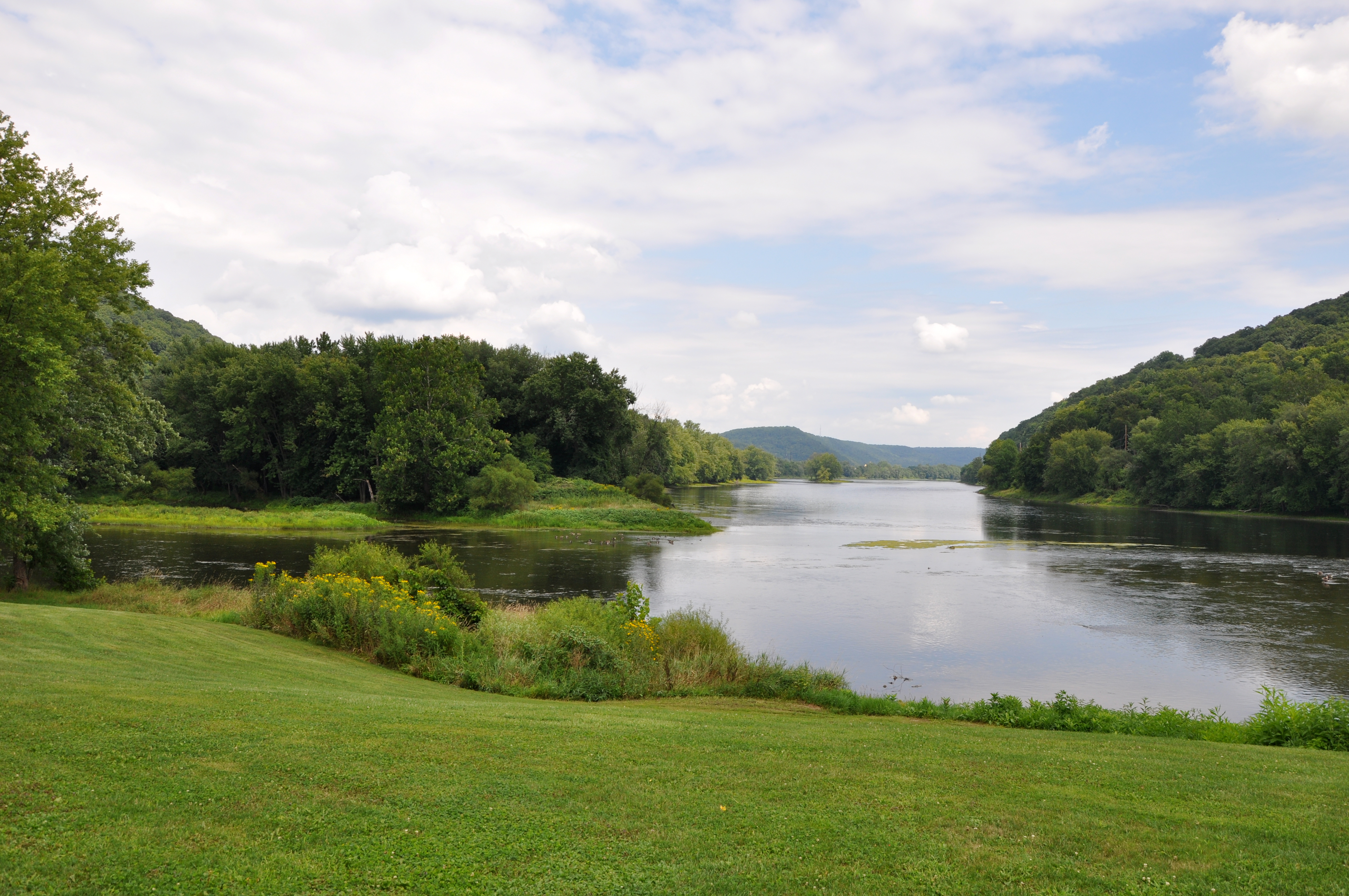
French Creek (left) meets the Allegheny River at Riverfront Park in Franklin.

According to the U.S. Census Bureau, the county has a total area of 683 square miles (1,770 km^{2}), of which 674 square miles (1,750 km^{2}) is land and 8.6 square miles (22 km^{2}) (1.3%) is water. Venango County is one of the 423 counties served by the Appalachian Regional Commission, and it is identified as part of the "Midlands" by Colin Woodard in his book American Nations: A History of the Eleven Rival Regional Cultures of North America.

French Creek is formed near French Creek, New York and extends for a length of 117 miles (188 km) with a drainage area of 1,270 square miles (3,300 km^{2}). It joins the Allegheny River near Franklin. The watershed area includes parts of Erie, Crawford, Venango, and Mercer Counties in Pennsylvania as well as Chautauqua County, New York.

=== Adjacent counties ===
- Crawford County (northwest)
- Warren County (north)
- Forest County (northeast)
- Clarion County (east)
- Butler County (south)
- Mercer County (west)

== Demographics ==
Historical population
Census	Pop.	Note	%±
1800	1,130		—
1810	3,060		170.8%
1820	4,915		60.6%
1830	9,470		92.7%
1840	17,900		89.0%
1850	18,310		2.3%
1860	25,043		36.8%
1870	47,925		91.4%
1880	43,670		−8.9%
1890	46,640		6.8%
1900	49,648		6.4%
1910	56,359		13.5%
1920	59,184		5.0%
1930	63,226		6.8%
1940	63,958		1.2%
1950	65,328		2.1%
1960	65,295		−0.1%
1970	62,353		−4.5%
1980	64,444		3.4%
1990	59,381		−7.9%
2000	57,555		−3.1%
2010	54,984		−4.5%
2020	50,454		−8.2%
2025 (est.)	49,346	▼	−2.2%
U.S. Decennial Census; 1790–1960 1900–1990; 1990–2000 2010–2017

Age pyramid for Venango County based on census 2000 data

=== Racial and ethnic composition ===
Venango County, Pennsylvania – Racial and ethnic composition Note: the US Census treats Hispanic/Latino as an ethnic category. This table excludes Latinos from the racial categories and assigns them to a separate category. Hispanics/Latinos may be of any race.
Race / Ethnicity (NH = Non-Hispanic)	Pop 1980	Pop 1990	Pop 2000	Pop 2010	Pop 2020	% 1980	% 1990	% 2000	% 2010	% 2020
White alone (NH)	63,686	58,488	56,016	53,052	47,117	98.82%	98.50%	97.31%	96.49%	93.39%
Black or African American alone (NH)	314	484	614	567	434	0.49%	0.82%	1.07%	1.03%	0.86%
Native American or Alaska Native alone (NH)	48	52	99	81	68	0.07%	0.09%	0.17%	0.15%	0.13%
Asian alone (NH)	155	135	131	196	172	0.24%	0.23%	0.23%	0.36%	0.34%
Native Hawaiian or Pacific Islander alone (NH)	x	x	11	10	10	x	x	0.02%	0.02%	0.02%
Other race alone (NH)	31	21	37	18	96	0.05%	0.04%	0.06%	0.03%	0.19%
Mixed race or Multiracial (NH)	x	x	359	582	1,980	x	x	0.62%	1.06%	3.92%
Hispanic or Latino (any race)	210	201	298	478	577	0.33%	0.34%	0.52%	0.87%	1.14%
Total	64,444	59,381	57,565	54,984	50,454	100.00%	100.00%	100.00%	100.00%	100.00%

=== 2020 census ===
As of the 2020 census, the county had a population of 50,454 and a median age of 47.4 years. 20.1% of residents were under the age of 18 and 23.7% of residents were 65 years of age or older. For every 100 females there were 97.6 males, and for every 100 females age 18 and over there were 95.7 males age 18 and over.

The racial makeup of the county was 47,117 (93.4%) White (NH), 434 (0.86%) Black or African American (NH), 68 (0.13%) Native American (NH), 172 (0.34%) Asian (NH), 10 (0.02%) Pacific Islander (NH), 2,076 (4.11%) Other/Mixed (NH), and 577 (1.14%) Hispanic or Latino residents of any race.

43.9% of residents lived in urban areas, while 56.1% lived in rural areas.

There were 21,506 households in the county, of which 24.9% had children under the age of 18 living in them. Of all households, 47.5% were married-couple households, 19.3% were households with a male householder and no spouse or partner present, and 25.8% were households with a female householder and no spouse or partner present. About 30.5% of all households were made up of individuals and 15.0% had someone living alone who was 65 years of age or older.

There were 26,156 housing units, of which 17.8% were vacant. Among occupied housing units, 74.7% were owner-occupied and 25.3% were renter-occupied. The homeowner vacancy rate was 2.0% and the rental vacancy rate was 9.7%.

=== 2000 census ===
As of the 2000 census, there were 57,565 people, 22,747 households, and 15,922 families residing in the county. The population density was 85 people per square mile (33 people/km^{2}). There were 26,904 housing units at an average density of 40 units per square mile (15/km^{2}). The racial makeup of the county was 97.64% White, 1.09% Black or African American, 0.18% Native American, 0.23% Asian, 0.02% Pacific Islander, 0.17% from other races, and 0.67% from two or more races. 0.52% of the population were Hispanic or Latino of any race. 43.9% English or Welsh, 12.5% were of German, 11.1% American, 9.9% Irish, 8.3% Scotch-Irish, 2.8% Dutch, 2.1% Italian, and 1.6% French ancestry.

There were 22,747 households, out of which 30.40% had children under the age of 18 living with them, 55.80% were married couples living together, 9.90% had a female householder with no husband present, and 30.00% were non-families. 26.20% of all households were made up of individuals, and 12.50% had someone living alone who was 65 years of age or older. The average household size was 2.45 and the average family size was 2.93.

In the county, the population was spread out, with 24.20% under the age of 18, 7.20% from 18 to 24, 26.70% from 25 to 44, 25.10% from 45 to 64, and 16.80% who were 65 years of age or older. The median age was 40 years. For every 100 females there were 95.40 males. For every 100 females age 18 and over, there were 92.10 males.

== Micropolitan Statistical Area ==
The United States Office of Management and Budget has designated Venango County as the Oil City, PA Micropolitan Statistical Area (μSA). As of the 2010 U.S. census the micropolitan area ranked 9th most populous in the State of Pennsylvania and the 182nd most populous in the United States with a population of 54,984.

== Law and government ==
United States presidential election results for Venango County, Pennsylvania
Year	Republican		Democratic		Third party(ies)	
Year	No.	%	No.	%	No.	%
1888	4,424	50.49%	3,475	39.66%	863	9.85%
1892	4,099	49.31%	3,288	39.55%	926	11.14%
1896	5,133	49.82%	4,599	44.63%	572	5.55%
1900	5,931	52.75%	4,014	35.70%	1,299	11.55%
1904	5,892	57.33%	1,747	17.00%	2,639	25.68%
1908	4,868	49.73%	2,815	28.76%	2,105	21.51%
1912	1,660	18.26%	2,507	27.57%	4,925	54.17%
1916	3,856	40.98%	3,938	41.85%	1,616	17.17%
1920	7,718	65.71%	2,669	22.72%	1,359	11.57%
1924	10,841	74.29%	1,886	12.92%	1,865	12.78%
1928	17,450	79.00%	4,531	20.51%	108	0.49%
1932	12,230	64.07%	6,174	32.34%	684	3.58%
1936	17,676	64.12%	9,212	33.42%	677	2.46%
1940	17,728	71.90%	6,873	27.87%	57	0.23%
1944	14,916	68.91%	6,426	29.69%	304	1.40%
1948	11,920	67.97%	5,144	29.33%	472	2.69%
1952	17,006	72.16%	6,356	26.97%	204	0.87%
1956	17,107	75.31%	5,594	24.63%	14	0.06%
1960	17,193	68.01%	8,064	31.90%	23	0.09%
1964	9,873	42.89%	13,065	56.75%	84	0.36%
1968	12,323	56.14%	8,319	37.90%	1,307	5.95%
1972	13,991	67.28%	6,302	30.31%	501	2.41%
1976	12,270	57.58%	8,653	40.60%	388	1.82%
1980	11,547	56.04%	7,800	37.86%	1,257	6.10%
1984	13,507	59.44%	9,114	40.11%	104	0.46%
1988	11,468	56.60%	8,624	42.56%	171	0.84%
1992	8,545	39.64%	8,230	38.18%	4,779	22.17%
1996	8,398	42.96%	8,205	41.97%	2,946	15.07%
2000	11,642	56.68%	8,196	39.90%	703	3.42%
2004	14,472	61.17%	9,024	38.14%	163	0.69%
2008	13,718	58.42%	9,238	39.34%	525	2.24%
2012	13,815	62.07%	7,945	35.70%	497	2.23%
2016	16,021	68.09%	6,309	26.81%	1,200	5.10%
2020	18,569	69.81%	7,585	28.51%	447	1.68%
2024	18,883	70.44%	7,624	28.44%	302	1.13%

United States Senate election results for Venango County, Pennsylvania1
Year	Republican		Democratic		Third party(ies)	
Year	No.	%	No.	%	No.	%
1994	9,871	56.79%	6,768	38.94%	743	4.27%
2000	11,846	58.46%	7,867	38.83%	549	2.71%
2006	9,042	51.54%	8,502	48.46%	0	0.00%
2012	13,608	61.76%	7,816	35.48%	608	2.76%
2018	11,210	60.56%	6,945	37.52%	357	1.93%
2024	17,825	66.93%	7,902	29.67%	904	3.39%

United States Senate election results for Venango County, Pennsylvania3
Year	Republican		Democratic		Third party(ies)	
Year	No.	%	No.	%	No.	%
1992	10,731	50.08%	9,184	42.86%	1,511	7.05%
1998	10,562	69.29%	4,226	27.72%	455	2.98%
2004	14,003	60.90%	6,648	28.91%	2,341	10.18%
2010	10,147	64.45%	5,597	35.55%	0	0.00%
2016	14,581	62.83%	6,989	30.11%	1,638	7.06%
2022	13,406	64.29%	6,777	32.50%	671	3.22%

Pennsylvania Gubernatorial election results for Venango County
Year	Republican		Democratic		Third party(ies)	
Year	No.	%	No.	%	No.	%
1970	8,311	49.02%	8,351	49.25%	293	1.73%
1974	10,221	62.15%	6,040	36.72%	186	1.13%
1978	8,515	49.92%	8,479	49.71%	62	0.36%
1982	10,399	57.34%	7,659	42.23%	78	0.43%
1986	8,530	49.56%	8,480	49.27%	200	1.16%
1990	4,899	32.88%	9,999	67.12%	0	0.00%
1994	10,682	61.60%	4,796	27.66%	1,864	10.75%
1998	9,643	62.96%	3,595	23.47%	2,078	13.57%
2002	9,188	60.48%	5,551	36.54%	452	2.98%
2006	9,742	55.20%	7,906	44.80%	0	0.00%
2010	10,937	68.82%	4,955	31.18%	0	0.00%
2014	7,771	55.10%	6,333	44.90%	0	0.00%
2018	10,856	58.29%	7,431	39.90%	338	1.81%
2022	12,741	60.91%	7,777	37.18%	401	1.92%

Venango County has long been predominantly Republican. Only twice since the Civil War has the county selected a Democratic presidential candidate, and only Lyndon B. Johnson in his 1964 landslide has gained an absolute majority for the Democratic Party. In 1984, Venango County actually voted fractionally more Democratic than the nation at-large due to hostility towards Reaganomics in industrial districts, and in the 1992 and 1996 elections it came within two points and one point, respectively of voting for Democrat Bill Clinton, but by 2016 Donald Trump had gained 68.1 percent to Hillary Clinton's 26.8 percent – figures which were long typical of the county.

=== Voter registration ===
As of February 21, 2022, there are 32,319 registered voters in Venango County

Chart of Voter Registration
1. Republican (58.4%)
2. Democratic (28.4%)
3. Independent (8.87%)
4. Third Party (4.35%)
- Democratic: 9,181 (28.41%)
- Republican: 18,864 (58.37%)
- Independent: 2,868 (8.87%)
- Third Party: 1,406 (4.35%)

=== County Commissioners ===
Office	Holder	Party
Commissioner	Samuel H. Breene	Republican
Commissioner	Ken Bryan	Republican
Commissioner	Tim Heffernan	Democrat

=== State Senate ===
Senator	Party	District
Scott Hutchinson	Republican	Pennsylvania's 21st Senatorial District

=== State House of Representatives ===
Representative	Party	District
Lee James	Republican	Pennsylvania's 64th Representative District

=== United States House of Representatives ===
Representative	Party	District
G.T. Thompson	Republican	Pennsylvania's 15th congressional district
Mike Kelly	Republican	Pennsylvania's 16th congressional district

=== United States Senate ===
Senator	Party
John Fetterman	Democratic
Dave McCormick	Republican

== Economy ==
=== Major employers ===
- Joy Mining Machinery
- Pennzoil
- Quaker State
- UPMC Northwest
- Komatsu

Pennzoil and Quaker State left the Venango area for Texas. After leaving the area they merged and stopped refining oil. They now concentrate on retail oil and automotive additives produced for them by other companies. As of 2007, the two companies only exist as brand names after the company disappeared because of successive mergers.

With global crude oil prices touching US$100 in early 2008, long-dormant interest reawakened in Venango County's remaining oil reserves, 70% undrilled by one estimate. High prices make less accessible oil deposits worth extracting. For instance, a Canadian firm proposed drilling several large mines and allowing oil to flood the tunnels.

== Education ==
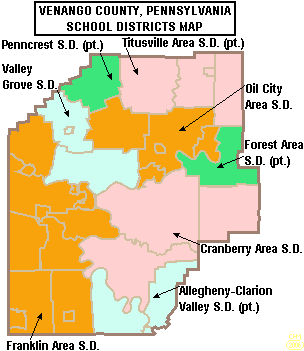
Venango County, Pennsylvania public school districts

Public school districts include:

- Cranberry Area School District
- Franklin Area School District
- Oil City Area School District
- Valley Grove School District

These public school districts are only partially in Venango County:

- Allegheny-Clarion Valley School District
- Forest Area School District
- Penncrest School District
- Titusville Area School District

Colleges and universities:

- Clarion University, Venango Campus (closed 2024)
- Dubois Business College (closed 2016)
- Penn State University Venango County Co-Op Extension

== Transportation ==
=== Airport ===
- Venango Regional Airport

=== Major highways ===
- I-80
- US 62
- US 322
- PA 8
- PA 27
- PA 36
- PA 38
- PA 157
- PA 208
- PA 227
- PA 257
- PA 308
- PA 417
- PA 427
- PA 428
- PA 965

== Recreation ==
=== Pennsylvania State Parks and Forests ===
- Oil Creek State Park
- Cornplanter State Forest
- Clear Creek State Forest

=== Attractions and tourism ===
- DeBence Antique Music World
- Oil Region Astronomical Observatory
- Franklin Silver Cornet Band
- Oil Valley Film Festival
- Franklin Public Library. The Franklin Public Library was founded in 1894 and has had several homes, although its current location on Twelfth Street in Franklin, Venango County, PA has been its home since 1921. The original structure on Twelfth Street was built in 1849 as a residence and required extensive renovations in 1921 to make it suitable for library use.

== Communities ==
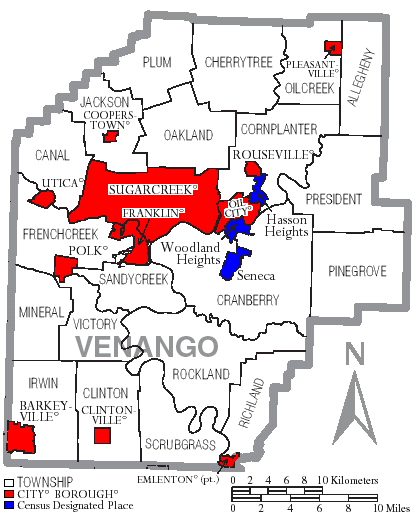
Venango County, Pennsylvania with Municipal Labels showing Cities and Boroughs (red), Townships (white), and Census-designated places (blue)

Under Pennsylvania law, there are four types of incorporated municipalities: cities, boroughs, townships, and, in at most two cases, towns. The following cities, boroughs and townships are located in Venango County:

=== Cities ===
- Franklin (county seat)
- Oil City

=== Boroughs ===
- Barkeyville
- Clintonville
- Cooperstown
- Emlenton (partly in Clarion County)
- Pleasantville
- Polk
- Rouseville
- Sugarcreek
- Utica

=== Townships ===
- Allegheny
- Canal
- Cherrytree
- Clinton
- Cornplanter
- Cranberry
- French Creek
- Irwin
- Jackson
- Mineral
- Oakland
- Oil Creek
- Pinegrove
- Plum
- President
- Richland
- Rockland
- Sandycreek
- Scrubgrass
- Victory

=== Census-designated places ===
Census-designated places are geographical areas designated by the U.S. Census Bureau for the purposes of compiling demographic data. They are not actual jurisdictions under Pennsylvania law. Other unincorporated communities, such as villages, may be listed here as well.

- Hannasville
- Hasson Heights
- Kennerdell
- Seneca
- Woodland Heights

=== Unincorporated communities ===
- Bredinsburg
- Cranberry
- Dempseytown
- Fertigs
- Petroleum Center
- Raymilton
- Siverly
- Venus

=== Population ranking ===
The population ranking of the following table is based on the 2010 census of Venango County.

† county seat

Rank	City/Town/etc.	Municipal type	Population (2018 Census)
1	Oil City	City	9,897
2.	Cranberry	Township	6,789
3	† Franklin	City	6,231
4	Sugar Creek	Borough	5,008
5.	Cornplanter	Township	2,316
6	Hasson Heights	CDP	1,437
7	Woodland Heights	CDP	1,726
8	Cherrytree	Township	1,378
9	Seneca	CDP	1,289
10	Pleasantville	Borough	887
11	Polk	Borough	826
12	Emlenton (partially in Clarion County)	Borough	625
13	Rouseville	Borough	523
14	Clintonville	Borough	508
15	Cooperstown	Borough	460
16	Kennerdell	CDP	247
17	Barkeyville	Borough	207
18	Utica	Borough	189
19	Hannasville	CDP	176

== Notable people ==
- Orrin Dubbs Bleakley
- Cornplanter
- William Holmes Crosby Jr.
- Hildegarde Dolson
- Frank Evans
- Gabby Gabreski
- Leon H. Gavin
- Alexander Hays
- Judge Robert Lamberton
- Ted Marchibroda
- Jesse L. Reno
- George C. Rickards
- Henry H. Rogers
- Joseph Sibley
- Peter Moore Speer
- Ida M. Tarbell
- John Wesley Van Dyke

== See also ==
- Oil Creek Library District
- Oil Region
