= Venango Regional Airport =

Venango Regional Airport Chess Lamberton Field

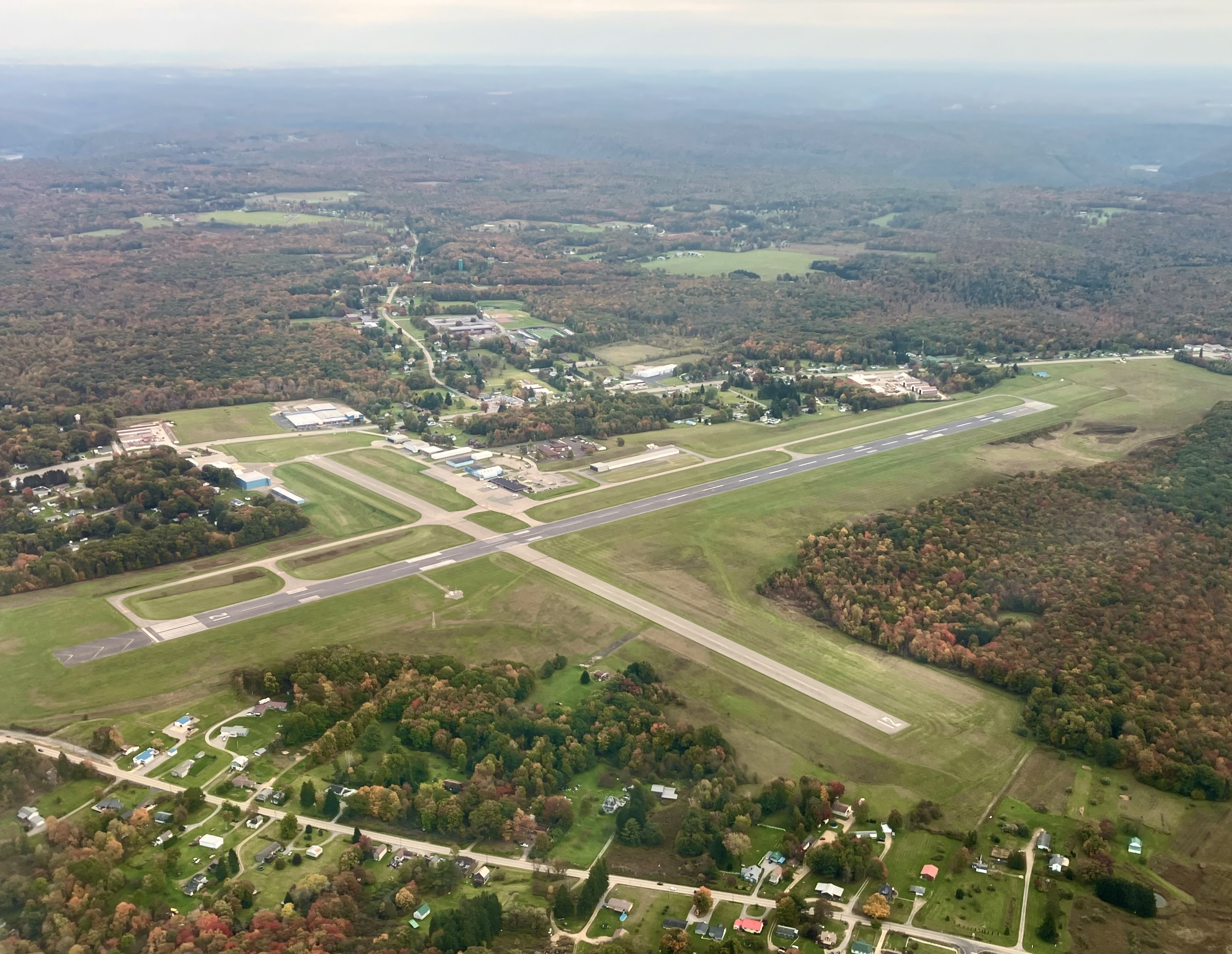
- IATA: FKL; ICAO: KFKL; FAA LID: FKL

Summary
- Airport type: Public
- Owner: Venango County
- Serves: Franklin, Pennsylvania; Oil City, Pennsylvania
- Location: Venango County, Pennsylvania
- Elevation AMSL: 1,540 ft (470 m)
- Coordinates: 41°22′40″N 079°51′37″W
- Website: FlyFranklin.org

Maps
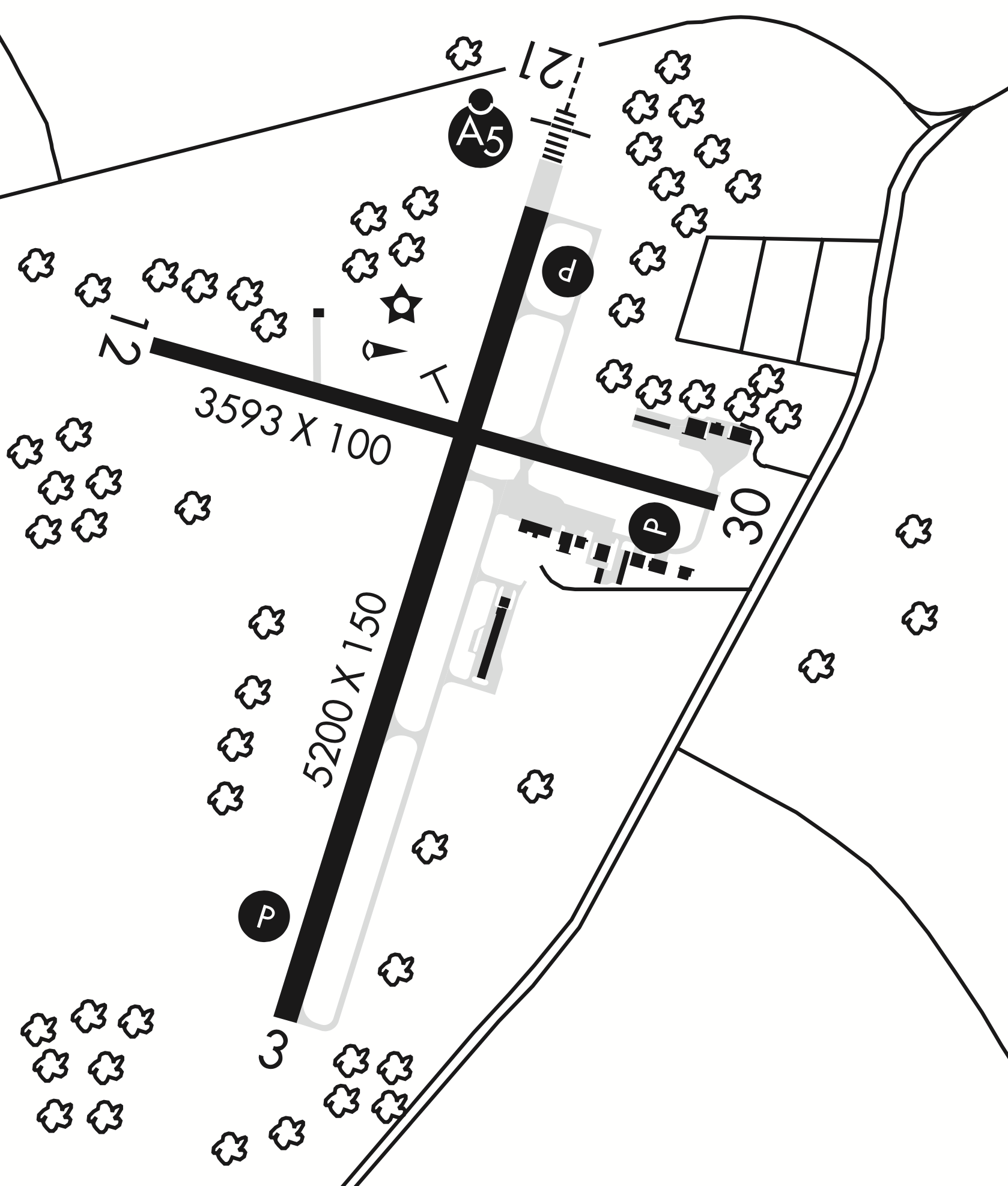

- Location of airport in Pennsylvania FKL (the United States)

Runways
Direction	Length		Surface
Direction	ft	m	Surface
3/21	5,201	1,585	Asphalt
12/30	3,592	1,095	Asphalt

Statistics (2011)
- Aircraft operations: 14,826
- Based aircraft: 40
- Source: Federal Aviation Administration

Venango Regional Airport (IATA: FKL, ICAO: KFKL, FAA LID: FKL), also known as Chess Lamberton Field, is a public airport in western Pennsylvania, 2 miles (3 km) southwest of Franklin and about 10 miles (16 km) southwest of Oil City. Both cities are in Venango County, which operates the airport. The airport had limited airline service, which was subsidized by the Essential Air Service program until October 2019.

Per Federal Aviation Administration records, the airport had 681 passenger boardings (enplanements) in calendar year 2008, 1,583 enplanements in 2009, and 1,380 in 2010. It is included in the National Plan of Integrated Airport Systems for 2011–2015, which categorized it as a general aviation facility (the commercial service category requires at least 2,500 enplanements per year).

== History ==
Aviation in Franklin area originated in 1929 when two local businessmen, Wayne W. Bleakley and Joseph McElhinney, Jr. became interested in aviation and went on to construct the first airport in what was then Sugarcreek Township. The airport was supported by local businessmen who formed a corporation. Some time later, under their stewardship the airport continued in existence until its abandonment in 1938. Thereafter, local aviators flew from the Splane Memorial Airport in Oil City from 1941 until 1950.

Construction of Chess Lamberton Airport as it was originally known, began in 1950. The airport was named after the grandson of Judge Robert Lamberton of Franklin, Pa., founder of the first bank in Venango County and later reformed as The Lamberton Savings Bank in 1887.

== Facilities and aircraft ==
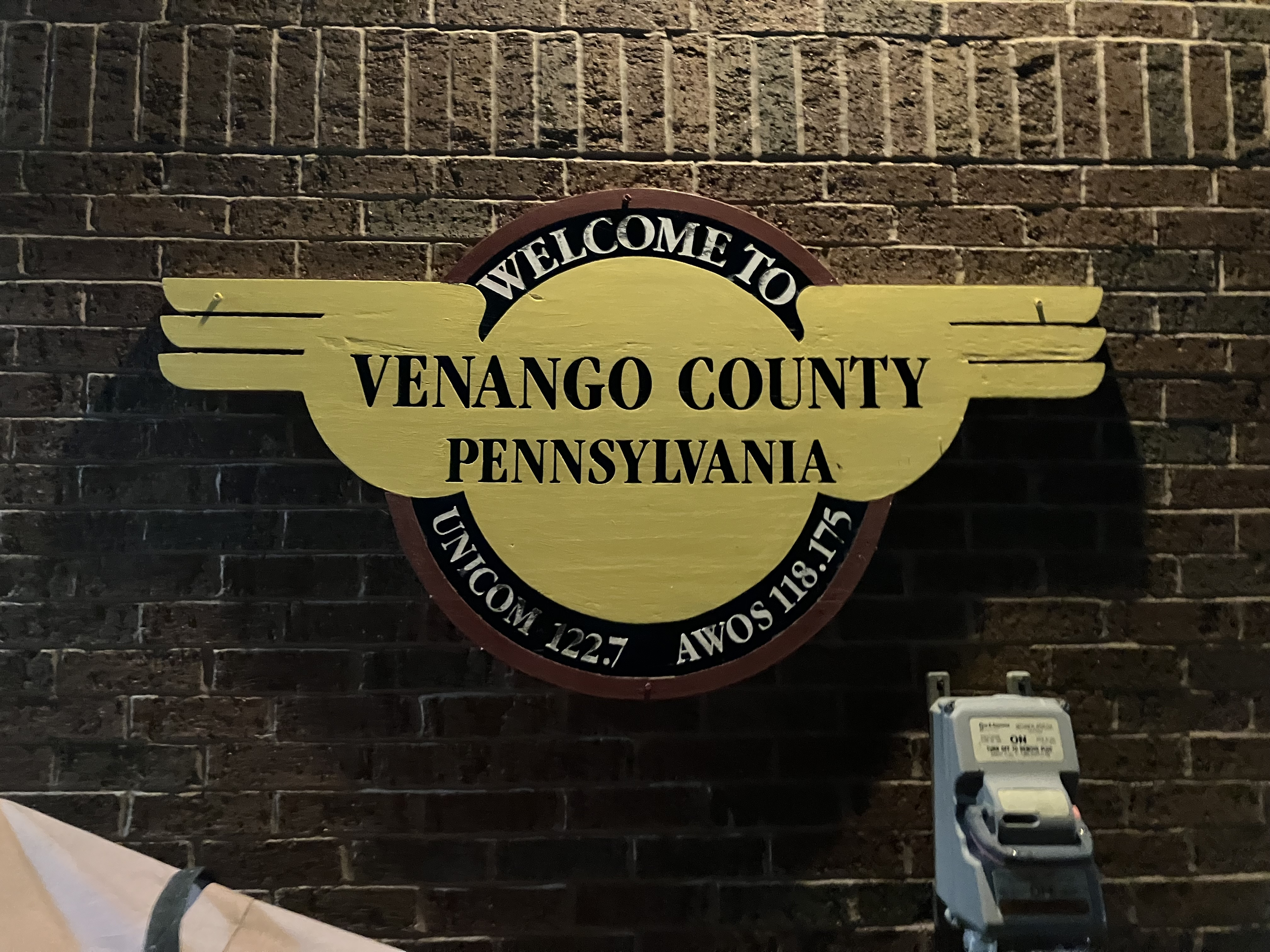
A “welcome to Venango County, Pennsylvania” on the airport’s terminal building, with its radio frequencies listed

Venango Regional Airport covers an area of 420 acres (170 ha) at an elevation of 1,540 feet (469 m) above mean sea level. It has two runways with asphalt surfaces: 3/21 is 5,201 by 150 feet (1,585 x 46 m) and 12/30 is 3,592 by 100 feet (1,095 x 30 m).

For the 12-month period ending December 31, 2011, the airport had 14,826 aircraft operations, an average of 40 per day: 83.5% general aviation, 16.3% air taxi, and 0.2% military. At that time there were 40 aircraft based at this airport: 82.5% single-engine, 7.5% ultralight, 5% multi-engine, 2.5% jet, and 2.5% helicopter.

== Airline and destination ==
As of 2026, no commercial airline service operates in the airport.

=== Statistics ===
Carrier shares: Mar 2017 – Feb 2018
Carrier	Passengers (arriving and departing)
Sun	2,620(100.00%)

Top domestic destinations: Mar 2017 – Feb 2018
Rank	City	Airport name & IATA code	Passengers
1	Pittsburgh, PA	Pittsburgh International Airport	1,500

== See also ==
- List of airports in Pennsylvania

== Other sources ==
- Essential Air Service documents (Docket OST-1997-2523) from the U.S. Department of Transportation:
  - Order 2003-5-24 (May 22, 2003): establishes a final rate for the essential air service operated by Air Midwest, Inc., d/b/a US Airways Express at Franklin/Oil City, Pennsylvania, for the period from October 1, 2001, through December 31, 2002; tentatively reselects Air Midwest at the community for the two-year period beginning January 1, 2003, but reducing the level of subsidized service from 24 to 18 round trips a week no later than 60 days after the service date of this order
  - Order 2005-4-5 (April 6, 2005): selecting Mesa Air Group, Inc., d/b/a Air Midwest to provide essential air service at Franklin/Oil City, Pennsylvania, consisting of two round trips each weekday and each weekend to Pittsburgh with 19-passenger Fairchild Metro III/23 aircraft, for two years for an annual subsidy rate of $683,636. Also setting a subsidy rate of $969,136 on an annual basis, for Mesa/Air Midwest¿s provision of three-round-trip service at Franklin/Oil City from January 1, 2005, until the carrier inaugurates two-round-trip service, or 60 days from the date of service of this order, whichever occurs first.
  - Order 2007-3-12 (March 14, 2007): re-selecting Air Midwest, Inc. to provide subsidized essential air service (EAS) at Franklin/Oil City, Pennsylvania, at an annual subsidy rate of $741,346, for the two-year period of April 1, 2007, through March 31, 2009.
  - Order 2007-7-21 (July 26, 2007): selecting Gulfstream International Airlines, Inc. to provide subsidized essential air service (EAS) at DuBois and Franklin/Oil City, Pennsylvania, Greenbrier/White Sulphur Springs/Lewisburg, West Virginia, and Athens, Georgia, at a total annual subsidy rate of $4,077,792 ($1,159,229 for DuBois, $763,741 for Franklin/Oil City, $1,329,477 for Greenbrier/White Sulphur Springs/Lewisburg, and $825,345 for Athens) for the two-year period beginning when Gulfstream inaugurates service through the end of the 24th month thereafter.
  - Order 2008-5-3 (May 6, 2008): selecting Gulfstream International Airlines, Inc. to provide subsidized essential air service (EAS) at DuBois and Franklin/Oil City, Pennsylvania, and Greenbrier/White Sulphur Springs/Lewisburg (Lewisburg), West Virginia, at a total annual subsidy rate of $5,577,594 ($2,020,095 for DuBois, $1,226,773 for Franklin/Oil City, and $2,330,725 for Lewisburg) for the two-year period beginning when Gulfstream inaugurates service through the end of the 24th month thereafter.
  - Order 2010-9-12 (September 9, 2010): re-selecting Gulfstream International Airlines to provide essential air service (EAS) at Bradford, DuBois, and Oil City/Franklin, Pennsylvania, and Jamestown, New York, for a combined annual subsidy of $5,870,657 ($1,087,306 for Bradford, $2,228,996 for DuBois, $915,101 for Oil City/Franklin, and $1,639,254 for Jamestown), from October 1, 2010, through September 30, 2012.
  - Order 2012-9-23 (September 27, 2012): selecting Silver Airways to provide Essential Air Service (EAS) at Bradford, DuBois, Franklin/Oil City, Pennsylvania, Jamestown, New York, and Parkersburg, West Virginia/Marietta, Ohio, for a combined annual subsidy of $10,348,117 ($1,940,272 for Bradford; $2,587,029 for DuBois, $1,293,515 for Franklin, $1,940,272 for Jamestown, and $2,587,029 for Parkersburg), from October 1, 2012, through September 30, 2014.
  - Notice of Intent (February 14, 2014): of Silver Airways Corp. to discontinue scheduled air service between Cleveland, Ohio (CLE) and: Jamestown, New York (JHW), Bradford, Pennsylvania (BFD), DuBois, Pennsylvania (DUJ), Franklin/Oil City, Pennsylvania (FKL), and Parkersburg, West Virginia/Marietta, Ohio (PKB).
  - Order 2014-4-26 (April 24, 2014): directing interested persons to show cause as to why the Department should not terminate the eligibility ... under the Essential Air Service (EAS) program based on criteria passed by Congress in the FAA Modernization and Reform Act of 2012 (Public Law No. 112-95). We find that Franklin/Oil City is within 175 miles of a large or medium hub, Pittsburgh International Airport (PIT), a medium hub, and, thus, is subject to the 10-enplanement statutory criterion. We also find that during fiscal year 2013, Franklin/Oil City generated a total of 3,134 passengers (inbound plus outbound). Consistent with the methodology described above, that results in an average of 5.0 enplanements per day, below the 10-enplanement statutory criterion necessary to remain eligible in the EAS program.

ACCIDENTS:

In 2012, a Cessna Citation Mustang blew a tire on landing.
