= Robert Lamberton (judge) =

American lawyer (1809-1885)

Robert Lamberton (March 20, 1809 – August 7, 1885) was an associate Judge of the Courts of Venango County, Pennsylvania, who founded the first bank in the county later known as the Lamberton Savings Bank. The bank building was demolished in 1969 to make way for the First National Bank of Pennsylvania.

== Early years ==
Robert Lamberton was born and brought up on the family farm near Eglinton, County Londonderry, Ireland. At the age of 21 he emigrated to the United States and stayed with an uncle in Plum township, Venago County, with whom he laboured for some months. He later obtained work as a stone cutter on the Erie Canal before returning to Franklin. From meagre beginnings as a clerk in a dry goods store he opened a small shop in the town which expanded rapidly and eventually became a department store dealing in furnishings and family supplies of every kind. In addition to merchandising, he was also involved in the establishment of a rolling mill and nail factory in the town and later erected mills for the manufacture of flour and lumber.

== Oil rush ==
The development of the oil business brought vast wealth into Venango County and demanded a need for adequate financial institutions. The early pioneers of the oil excitement had to have a safe place to keep their large sums of money so Lamberton opened the first bank in the County and installed an exceptionally large strong safe in his store. In 1860 when he built the Lamberton Homestead, he included a banking room within the premises. The site was subsequently used for the YMCA building which now too is long gone. He continued to make large investments in real estate in Franklin.

== Public service ==
In 1861, he was elected as an associate Judge of the Courts of Venango County, an office he held with honour for five years. He also served several terms with the City Council as a Democrat. As a church officer and trustee of Franklin Presbyterian Church he was heavily involved in all church activities from an early stage.

Lamberton died on August 7, 1885, at the age of 77. The funeral was reported as being the largest ever gathered in the city.

== Legacy ==
His legacy continues to this day with the name being synonymous with various places in Venango County such as the Lamberton House and the Lamberton Block in Franklin , Chess Lamberton airport now renamed Venango Regional Airport and the Lamberton School at Cranberry. There are also several roads and streets named Lamberton within the County. The name is also associated with the promotion of further education with the Lamberton Scholarship at Franklin High School.
