= Polk, Pennsylvania =

Borough in Pennsylvania, US

- Borough
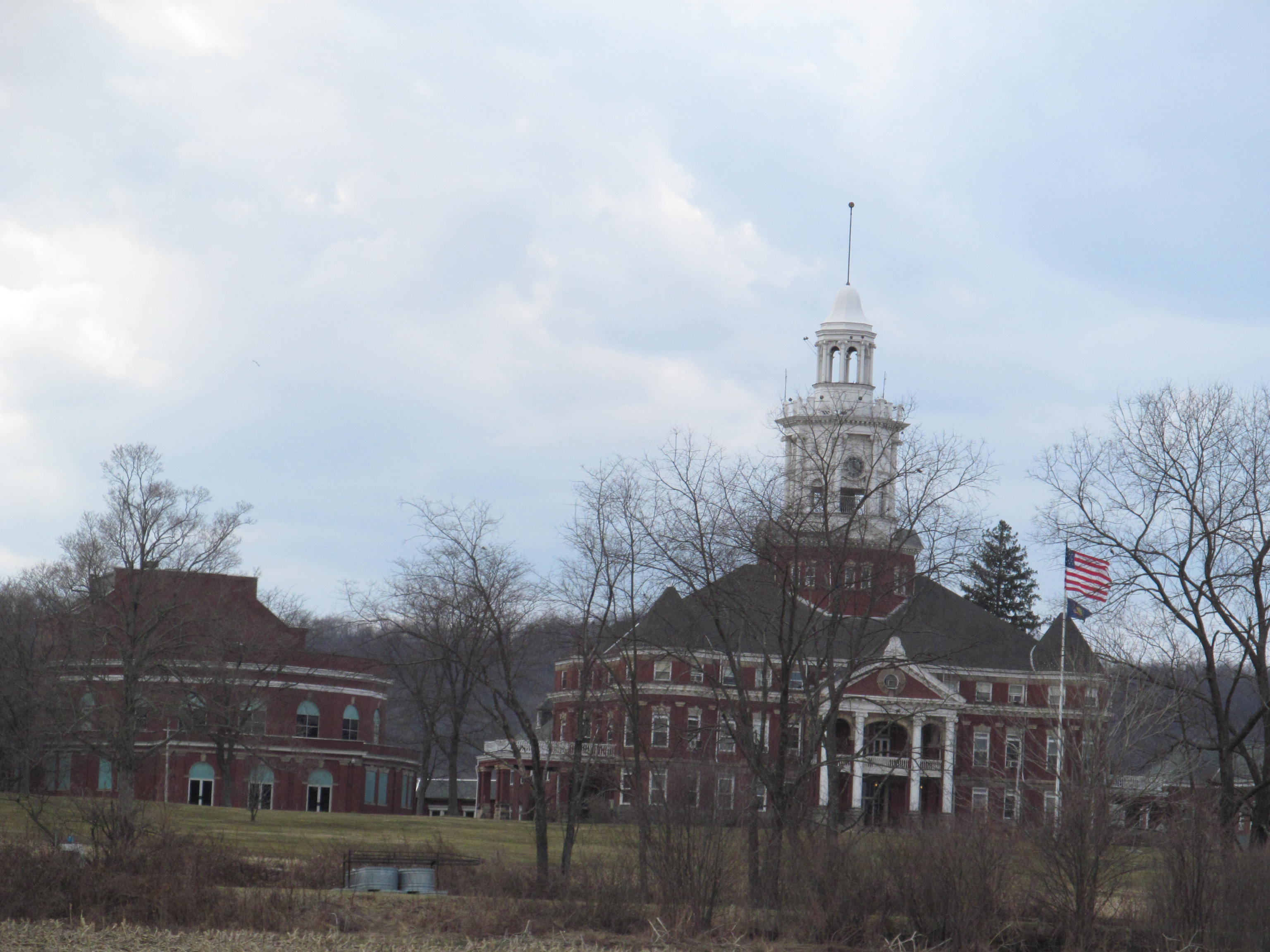
- Polk State School Administration Building

- Location of Polk in Venango County, Pennsylvania.

- Location within Pennsylvania
- Coordinates: 41°22′18″N 79°55′46″W
- Country: United States
- State: Pennsylvania
- County: Venango
- Settled: 1839
- Incorporated: 1886

Government
  - Type: Borough Council
  - Mayor: Larry Allen Boyle (Libertarian)

Area
  - Total: 2.04 sq mi (5.28 km^{2})
  - Land: 2.03 sq mi (5.25 km^{2})
  - Water: 0.012 sq mi (0.03 km^{2})

Population (2020)
  - Total: 634
  - Density: 312.7/sq mi (120.73/km^{2})
- Time zone: UTC-5 (Eastern (EST))
  - Summer (DST): UTC-4 (EDT)
- Zip code: 16342
- Area code: 814
- FIPS code: 42-61936

Polk is a borough in Venango County, Pennsylvania, United States. The population was 703 at the 2020 census.

Polk State Center, a state-run facility for the intellectually disabled, was opened in 1897 and is located in the borough. In 2019, Pennsylvania announced a plan to close the facility. Families and residents sued Pennsylvania in an attempt to prevent the closure.

== Geography ==
Polk (pronounced pōk) is located at 41°22′18″N 79°55′46″W (41.371532, -79.929445).

According to the United States Census Bureau, the borough has a total area of 2.0 square miles (5.2 km^{2}), of which 1.9 square miles (4.9 km^{2}) is land and 0.51% is water.

== Demographics ==
Historical population
Census	Pop.	Note	%±
1900	1,037		—
1910	2,066		99.2%
1920	2,662		28.8%
1930	3,337		25.4%
1940	3,690		10.6%
1950	4,004		8.5%
1960	3,574		−10.7%
1970	3,673		2.8%
1980	1,884		−48.7%
1990	1,267		−32.7%
2000	1,031		−18.6%
2010	816		−20.9%
2020	634		−22.3%
2021 (est.)	698	▲	10.1%

As of the census of 2000, there were 1,031 people, 196 households, and 127 families residing in the borough. The population density was 531.0 inhabitants per square mile (205.0/km^{2}). There were 209 housing units at an average density of 107.6 per square mile (41.5/km^{2}). The racial makeup of the borough was 96.22% White, 2.72% African American, 0.19% Native American, 0.29% Asian, 0.39% from other races, and 0.19% from two or more races.

There were 196 households, out of which 32.1% had children under the age of 18 living with them, 49.5% were married couples living together, 9.7% had a female householder with no husband present, and 35.2% were non-families. 33.2% of all households were made up of individuals, and 11.2% had someone living alone who was 65 years of age or older. The average household size was 2.34 and the average family size was 2.95.

In the borough the population was spread out, with 11.6% under the age of 18, 3.2% from 18 to 24, 31.0% from 25 to 44, 37.1% from 45 to 64, and 17.1% who were 65 years of age or older. The median age was 46 years. For every 100 females there were 102.6 males. For every 100 females age 18 and over, there were 99.8 males.

The median income for a household in the borough was $33,929, and the median income for a family was $38,438. Males had a median income of $22,273 versus $31,875 for females. The per capita income for the borough was $12,963. About 3.1% of families and 35.0% of the population were below the poverty line, including 1.7% of those under age 18 and 42.5% of those age 65 or over.
