= Forest Area School District =

Public school district school in Elk County, Pennsylvania

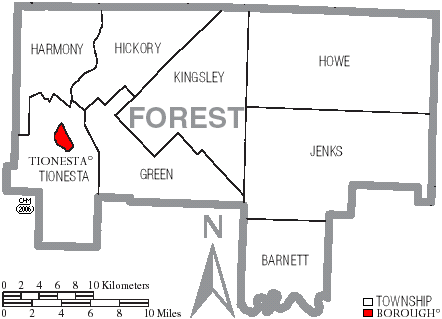
- Map of Forest County, Pennsylvania with Municipal Labels showing Boroughs (red) and Townships (white).

Address
- 22318 Route 62 Box 16 Northwestern Pennsylvania Tionesta, Forest County, Venango County, Elk County, Pennsylvania, 16353; United States

District information
- Type: Public school district

Other information
- Website: https://www.forestareaschools.org/

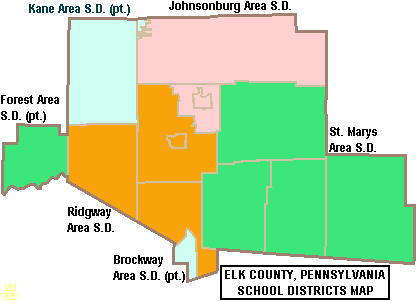
Map of Elk County, Pennsylvania School Districts

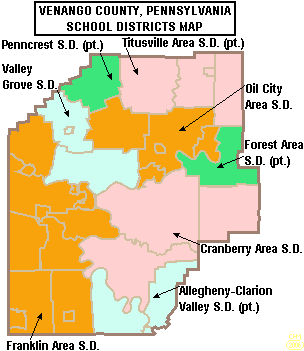
Map of Venango County, Pennsylvania Public School Districts

Forest Area School District is a small, rural, public school district in northwestern Pennsylvania. It is the public school entity for all of Forest County. It serves the communities of Marienville and Tionesta, along with a portion of President Township in Venango County, and Millstone Township in Elk County. The district encompasses approximately 500 square miles (1,300 km^{2}). According to 2000 federal census data, it serves a resident population of 4,946. By 2010, the District's population increased to 8,255 people. The educational attainment levels for the Forest Area School District population (25 years old and over) were 80.9% high school graduates and 9.8% college graduates. The district is one of the 500 public school districts of Pennsylvania.

According to the Pennsylvania Budget and Policy Center, 57.8% of the District's pupils lived at 185% or below the Federal Poverty Level as shown by their eligibility for the federal free or reduced price school meal programs in 2012. In 2009, the District residents' per capita income was $14,370 a year, while the median family income was $33,333. In the Commonwealth, the median family income was $49,501 and the United States median family income was $49,445, in 2010. In Forest County, the median household income was $36,556. By 2013, the median household income in the United States rose to $52,100. In 2014, the median household income in the USA was $53,700.

== Schools ==
East Forest Elementary	Marienville, Pennsylvania
West Forest Elementary	Tionesta, Pennsylvania
East Forest High	Marienville, Pennsylvania
West Forest High	Tionesta, Pennsylvania

High school students may choose to attend the Venango Technology Center for training in the construction and mechanical trades. The Riverview Intermediate Unit IU6 provides the District with a wide variety of services like specialized education for disabled students and hearing, background checks for employees, state mandated recognizing and reporting child abuse training, speech and visual disability services and criminal background check processing for prospective employees and professional development for staff and faculty.
