= Valley Grove School District =

School district in Pennsylvania

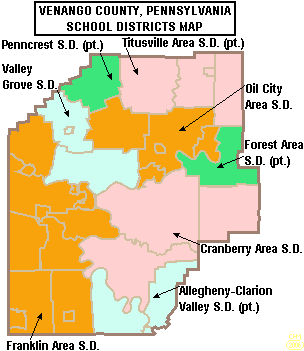

Address
- 429 Wiley Ave Franklin, Pennsylvania, 16323; United States

District information
- Type: Public

Other information
- Website: www.vgsd.org

The Valley Grove School District is a rural public school district in Venango County, Pennsylvania, serving the boroughs of Sugarcreek and Cooperstown, as well as Jackson Township. Valley Grove School District encompasses approximately 63 square miles. According to 2001 local census data, it serves a resident population of 6,708. In 2009, the per capita income was $16,297, while the median family income was $37,177 a year.

The district operates two schools: Valley Grove Elementary School and Rocky Grove Junior/Senior High School.
