= PIAA football =

High school football teams

Pennsylvania Interscholastic Athletic Association
- Sport: American football
- Founded: 1913
- Divisions: 12
- No. of teams: 555
- Headquarters: 550 Gettysburg Rd. Mechanicsburg, Pennsylvania, U.S. 17055
- Most recent champions: 1A) Bishop Guilfoyle; 2A) Troy; 3A) Northwestern Lehigh; 4A) Bonner & Prendergast; 5A) Bishop McDevitt; 6A) St. Joseph's Prep
- Website: piaa.org

As of the 2022-2023 and the 2023-2024 school years, there are 555 high school football teams competing in the Pennsylvania Interscholastic Athletic Association's (PIAA) 12 Districts. Each district is divided into numerous leagues and conferences. Up until the end of the 2015–16 school year, there were only four classifications, ranging from Class A to Class AAAA. At the beginning of the 2016–17 school year, an update took place and the PIAA added two additional classifications, making six total.

The classifications range from Class A (1A) to Class AAAAAA (6A). As of the beginning of the 2022–23 school year, the PIAA will have 95 A or (1A) class, 94 AA or (2A) class, 88 AAA or (3A) class, 92 AAAA or (4A) class, 98 AAAAA or (5A) class and 88 AAAAAA or (6A) class schools competing throughout the football season. Every two years, the PIAA reconfigures the classifications due to student population changes in Pennsylvania high schools.

== PIAA Districts ==
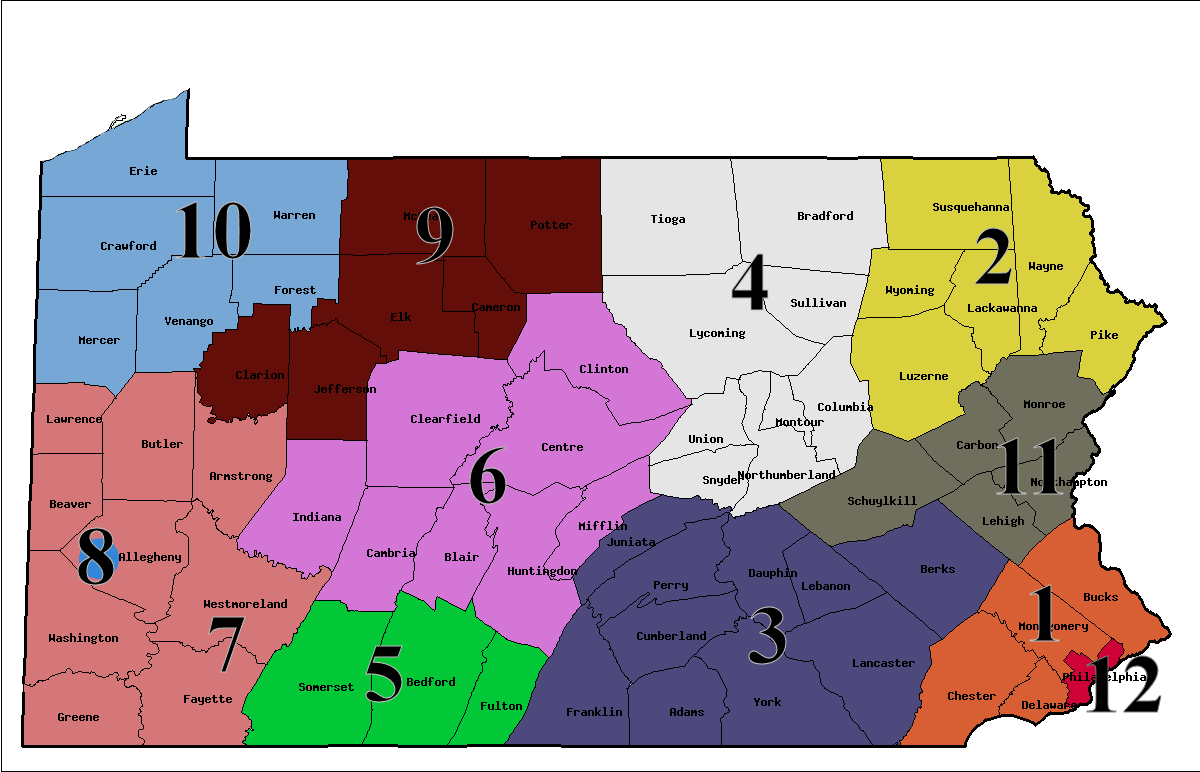
A map of PIAA districts

The PIAA divides its schools into 12 districts for state championship competitions. All 67 counties in Pennsylvania belong to a distinct district. The district breakdown and the counties included are as follows:

- District I or District 1 (Bucks, Chester, Delaware and Montgomery).
- District II or District 2 (Lackawanna, Luzerne, Pike, Susquehanna, Wayne and Wyoming).
- District III or District 3 (Adams, Berks, Cumberland, Dauphin, Franklin, Juniata, Lancaster, Lebanon, Perry and York).
- District IV or District 4 (Bradford, Columbia, Lycoming, Montour, Northumberland, Snyder, Sullivan, Tioga and Union).
- District V or District 5 (Bedford, Fulton and Somerset).
- District VI or District 6 (Blair, Cambria, Centre, Clearfield, Clinton, Huntingdon, Indiana and Mifflin).
- District VII (WPIAL) or District 7 (Allegheny, Armstrong, Beaver, Butler, Fayette, Greene, Lawrence, Washington and Westmoreland).
- District VIII or District 8 (Pittsburgh Public Schools)
- District IX or District 9 (Cameron, Clarion, Elk, Jefferson, McKean and Potter).
- District X or District 10 (Crawford, Erie, Forest, Mercer, Venango and Warren).
- District XI or District 11 (Carbon, Lehigh, Monroe, Northampton and Schuylkill).
- District XII or District 12 (Philadelphia) including Philadelphia Catholic League and Public League.

=== Enrollment Requirements ===
Total Male Enrollment	Classification	Number of Sr. High Schools
1-123	A	96
124-180	AA	94
181-262	AAA	88
263-382	AAAA	92
383-557	AAAAA	98
558-99999	AAAAAA	88

=== School Classifications ===
District: Counties (Number of total participating schools in each district)	A	AA	AAA	AAAA	AAAAA	AAAAAA
District 1: Bucks, Chester, Delaware, and Montgomery (70 schools)	3	2	--	8	24	33
District 2: Lackawanna, Luzerne, Pike, Susquehanna, Wayne and Wyoming (33 schools)	2	7	6	10	6	2
District 3: Adams, Berks, Cumberland, Dauphin, Franklin, Juniata, Lancaster, Lebanon, Perry and York (92 schools)	3	7	14	23	26	19
District 4: Bradford, Columbia, Lycoming, Montour, Northumberland, Snyder, Sullivan, Tioga and Union (34 schools)	7	10	10	6	--	1
District 5: Bedford, Fulton and Somerset (11 schools)	6	4	1	--	--	--
District 6: Blair, Cambria, Centre, Clearfield, Clinton, Huntingdon, Indiana and Mifflin (40 schools)	14	15	3	3	2	3
District 7: Allegheny (excluding City of Pittsburgh), Armstrong, Beaver, Butler, Fayette, Greene, Lawrence, Washington and Westmoreland (121 schools)	30	24	20	23	18	6
District 8: Pittsburgh Public Schools (6 schools)	--	2	--	2	1	1
District 9: Cameron, Clarion, Elk, Jefferson, McKean and Potter (23 schools)	12	6	3	2	--	--
District 10: Crawford, Erie, Forest, Mercer, Venango and Warren (38 schools)	11	7	15	2	1	2
District 11: Carbon, Lehigh, Monroe, Northampton and Schuylkill (47 schools)	6	9	10	6	6	10
District 12: Philadelphia Catholic League and the Public League (40 schools)	1	1	6	7	14	11
All Districts (553 schools)	95	94	88	92	98	88

== PIAA Teams ==
- State Championships listed in **Bold** indicate State Champion, Non-bold indicates Runner-Up

=== A ===
School	Team	City/Town	County	Class	Colors	District	Conference/League	State Championships
Abington	Galloping Ghosts	Abington Township	Montgomery	AAAAAA	maroon & white	District I	Suburban One League (National Conference)	
Abington Heights	Comets	Clarks Summit	Lackawanna	AAAAA	blue & white	District II	Lackawanna Interscholastic Athletic Association (LIAA) - Division 1	
Abraham Lincoln	Rail Splitters	Philadelphia	Philadelphia	AAAAAA	gold & black	District XII	Philadelphia Public League - Independence Conference	
Academy at Palumbo	Griffin	Philadelphia	Philadelphia	AAAAAA	black, silver & teal	District XII	Philadelphia Public League - American Conference	
Academy Park	Knights	Sharon Hill	Delaware	AAAAA	blue & silver	District I	Delaware Valley League	
Albert Gallatin	Colonials	Uniontown	Fayette	AAAA	black, silver & white	District VII	Independent	
Aliquippa	Quips	Aliquippa	Beaver	AAAA	red & black	District VII	WPIAL 4A Parkway Conference	State Champions **1991 (AA)**, **2003 (AA)**, **2018 (AAA)**, **2021 (AAAA)** & **2023 (AAAA)** - runner up 1988 (AAA), 2000 (AA), 2012 (AA), 2015 (AA) & 2022 (AAAA)
Allentown Central Catholic	Vikings	Allentown	Lehigh	AAAA	green & gold	District XI	Eastern Pennsylvania Conference - South	State Champions **1993 (AAA)**, **1998 (AAA)**, **2010 (AAA)**
Altoona	Lions	Altoona	Blair	AAAAAA	maroon & white	District VI	Mid-Pen Conference - Commonwealth Division	
Ambridge	Bridgers	Ambridge	Beaver	AAAA	garnet & gray	District VII	WPIAL 4A Parkway Conference	
Annville-Cleona	Dutchmen	Annville Township	Lebanon	AA	scarlet, black & white	District III	Lancaster-Lebanon League - Section 5	
Apollo-Ridge	Vikings	Spring Church	Armstrong	AA	blue & gold	District VII	WPIAL 2A Allegheny Conference	
Archbishop Carroll	Patriots	Radnor	Delaware	AAA	red, white & black	District XII	Philadelphia Catholic League - Blue Division	
Archbishop Ryan	Raiders	Philadelphia	Philadelphia	AAAA	red & black	District XII	Philadelphia Catholic League - Blue Division	
Archbishop Wood	Vikings	Warminster	Bucks	AAAAA	black & gold	District XII	Philadelphia Catholic League - Red Division	State Champions **2011 (AAA)**, **2013 (AAA)**, **2014 (AAA)**, **2016 (AAAAA)**, **2017 (AAAAA)** & **2019 (AAAAA)** - runner up 2008 (AAA) & 2012 (AAA)
Armstrong	River Hawks	Kittanning	Armstrong	AAAA	blue & orange	District VII	WPIAL 4A Greater Allegheny Conference	
Athens	Wildcats	Athens	Bradford	AAA	silver & black	District IV	Northern Tier Large Conference	
Avella	Eagles	Avella	Washington	A	blue & gold	District VII	WPIAL 1A Black Hills Conference	
Avon Grove	Red Devils	West Grove	Chester	AAAAAA	maroon & gold	District I	Ches-Mont League - National Conference	
Avonworth	Antelopes	Pittsburgh	Allegheny	AAA	red, white & gray	District VII	WPIAL 3A Western Hills Conference	runner up 2019 (AA)

=== B ===
School	Team	City/Town	County	Class	Colors	District	Conference/League	State Championships
Bald Eagle	Bald Eagles	Wingate	Centre	AA	blue & gold	District VI	**Laurel Highlands Athletic Conference - East 2 Division**	
Baldwin	Highlanders	Pittsburgh	Allegheny	AAAAA	purple & white	District VII	**WPIAL 5A Allegheny Six Conference**	
Bangor	Slaters	Bangor	Northampton	AAAA	maroon & white	District XI	**Schuylkill Colonial League - Gold Division**	
Bayard Rustin (West Chester Rustin)	Golden Knights	West Chester	Chester	AAAAA	navy & gold	District I	**Ches-Mont League - American Conference**	
Beaver	Bobcats	Beaver	Beaver	AAA	maroon & gray	District VII	**WPIAL 3A Western Hills Conference**	
Beaver Falls	Tigers	Beaver Falls	Beaver	AA	orange & black	District VII	**WPIAL 2A Midwestern Conference**	State Champions **2016 (AAA)**
Bedford	Bisons	Bedford	Bedford	AA	blue & white	District V	**Laurel Highlands Athletic Conference - West 2 Division**	
Bellefonte	Red Raiders	Bellefonte	Centre	AAAA	red & white	District VI	**Laurel Highlands Athletic Conference - East 2 Division**	
Belle Vernon	Leopards	Belle Vernon	Fayette & Westmoreland	AAA	green, gold & white	District VII	**WPIAL 3A Interstate Conference**	State Champions **2022 (AAA)**
Bellwood-Antis	Blue Devils	Bellwood	Blair	AA	blue, gold & white	District VI	**Laurel Highlands Athletic Conference - East 1 Division**	
Belmont Charter	Tigers	Philadelphia	Philadelphia	A	blue, white & black	District XII	**Philadelphia Public League - Liberty Conference**	
Benjamin Franklin	Electrons	Philadelphia	Philadelphia	AAAAA	blue & gold	District XII	**Philadelphia Public -National Conference**	
Bensalem	Fighting Owls	Bensalem Township	Bucks	AAAAAA	blue, white & silver	District I	**Suburban One League - Continental Conference**	
Bentworth	Bearcats	Bentleyville	Washington	A	black & yellow	District VII	**WPIAL 1A Tri-County South Conference**	
Berks Catholic	Saints	Reading	Berks	AAA	black & gold	District III	**Lancaster-Lebanon League - Section 4**	
Berlin Brothersvalley	Mountaineers	Berlin	Somerset	AA	blue & white	District V	**Inter County Conference - South Division**	
Bermudian Springs	Eagles	York Springs	Adams	AAA	red, white, silver & black	District III	**York-Adams Interscholastic Athletic Association (YAIAA) - Division III**	
Berwick	Bulldogs	Berwick	Columbia	AAAA	blue & white	District II	**Wyoming Valley Conference - Division 1**	State Champions **1988 (AAA)**, **1992 (AAA)**, **1994 (AAA)**, **1995 (AAA)**, **1996 (AAA)** & **1997 (AAA)** - runner up 1989 (AAA)
Bethel Park	Black Hawks	Pittsburgh	Allegheny	AAAAA	black, orange & white	District VII	**WPIAL 5A Allegheny Six Conference**	runner up 2008 (AAAA)
Bethlehem Catholic	Hawks	Bethlehem	Lehigh	AAAA	brown & gold	District XI	**Eastern Pennsylvania Conference - South**	State Champions **1988 (AA) & 1990 (AAA)**
Bethlehem Center	Bulldogs	Fredericktown	Washington	A	blue & gold	District VII	**WPIAL 1A Tri-County South Conference**	
Biglerville	Canners	Biglerville	Adams	AAA	black & gold	District III	**York-Adams Interscholastic Athletic Association (YAIAA) - Division III**	
Big Spring	Bulldogs	Newville	Cumberland	AAAA	maroon & gold	District III	**Mid-Pen Conference - Capital Division**	
Bishop Canevin	Crusaders	Pittsburgh	Allegheny	A	blue & white	District VII	**WPIAL 1A Black Hills Conference**	runner up 1990 (AA)
Bishop Guilfoyle	Marauders	Altoona	Blair	AA	purple & gold	District VI	**Laurel Highlands Athletic Conference - East 1 Division**	State Champions **2014 (A)**, **2015 (A)**, **2016 (A)** & **2021 (A)** - runner up 2019 (A)
Bishop McCort (McCort-Carroll)	Crushers	Johnstown	Cambria	A	red & gold	District VI	**Laurel Highlands Athletic Conference - West 1 Division**	runner up 2009 (A)
Bishop McDevitt (Harrisburg)	Crusaders	Harrisburg	Dauphin	AAAA	blue & gold	District III	**Mid-Penn Conference - Keystone Division**	State Champions **1995 (AA)** & **2022 (AAAA)** - runner up 2010 (AAA), 2011 (AAA), 2013 (AAA) & 2021 (AAAA)
Bishop Shanahan	Eagles	Downingtown	Chester	AAAA	d. green, black & silver	District I	**Ches-Mont League - National Conference**	
Blackhawk	Cougars	Beaver Falls	Beaver	AAAA	green & gold	District VII	**WPIAL 4A Parkway Conference**	runner up 1992 (AAA), 1993 (AAA), 1996 (AAA)
Bloomsburg	Panthers	Bloomsburg	Columbia	AA	red, black & white	District IV	**Pennsylvania Heartland Athletic Conference (PHAC) - Division 2**	
Blue Mountain	Eagles	Schuylkill Haven	Schuylkill	AAAA	blue, l. blue, silver & white	District XI	**Schuylkill Colonial League - Gold Division**	
Boiling Springs	Bubblers	Boiling Springs	Cumberland	AAAA	purple & gold	District III	**Mid-Pen Conference - Capital Division**	
Boyertown	Bears	Boyertown	Berks	AAAAAA	black & red	District I	**Pioneer Athletic Conference - Liberty Division**	
Boys' Latin Charter	Warriors	Philadelphia	Philadelphia	AAAA	white & maroon	District XII	**Philadelphia Public League - Liberty Conference**	
Bradford	Owls	Bradford	McKean	AAAA	black, red & white	District IX	**District 9 - Region 1 Division**	
Brashear	Bulls	Pittsburgh	Allegheny	AAAAA	black & gold	District VIII	**Pittsburgh City League Conference**	
Brentwood	Spartans	Pittsburgh	Allegheny	AA	blue & gold	District VII	**WPIAL 2A Century Conference**	
Bristol	Warriors	Bristol	Bucks	AA	red, silver & black	District I	**Bicentennial Athletic League**	
Brockway	Rovers	Brockway	Jefferson	A	black & red	District IX	**District 9 - Region 2 Division**	
Brookville	Raiders	Brookville	Jefferson	AA	blue & white	District IX	**District 9 - Region 1 Division**	
Brownsville	Falcons	Brownsville	Fayette	AA	black & gold	District VII	**Independent**	
Bucktail	Bucks	Renovo	Clinton	A	red & white	District IV	plays in **District 9 - Region 3 Division**	
Burgettstown	Blue Devils	Burgettstown	Washington	A	blue & white	District VII	**WPIAL 1A Black Hills Conference**	
Burrell	Bucs	Lower Burrell	Westmoreland	AA	blue & l. blue	District VII	**WPIAL 2A Allegheny Conference**	runner up 1995 (AA)
Butler	Golden Tornado	Butler	Butler	AAAAAA	blue & gold	District VII	plays in **District 10 - Region 6 Division**	

=== C ===
School	Team	City/Town	County	Class	Colors	District	Conference/League	State Championships
California	Trojans	Coal Center	Washington	A	burgundy & gold	District VII	WPIAL 1A Tri-County South Conference	
Cambria Heights	Highlanders	Patton	Cambria	A	red & blue	District VI	Heritage Conference	
Cambridge Springs	Blue Devils	Cambridge Springs	Crawford	A	blue, black & white	District X	District 10 Region 1 Division	runner up 1988 (A)
Cameron County	Raiders	Emporium	Cameron	A	red & white	District IX	District 9 - Region 3 Division	
Camp Hill	Lions	Camp Hill	Cumberland	AA	blue & white	District III	Mid-Penn Conference - Capital Division	State Champions **1988 (A)**
Canon-McMillan	Big Macs	Canonsburg	Washington	AAAAAA	blue & gold	District VII	WPIAL 6A Tri-County Five Conference	
Canton	Warriors	Canton	Bradford	A	crimson, white & black	District IV	Northern Tier League - Large School Division	
Carbondale	Chargers	Carbondale	Lackawanna	AAA	red, white & blue	District II	Lackawanna Interscholastic Athletic Association (LIAA) - Division 3	
Cardinal O'Hara	Lions	Springfield Township	Delaware	AAAA	blue & red	District XII	Philadelphia Catholic League - Blue Division	
Carlisle	Thundering Herd	Carlisle	Cumberland	AAAAAA	green & white	District III	Mid-Penn Commonwealth Conference	
Carlynton	Cougars	Carnegie	Allegheny	A	green & gold	District VII	WPIAL 1A Black Hills Conference	
Carmichaels	Mighty Mikes	Carmichaels	Greene	A	blue & gold	District VII	WPIAL 1A Tri-County South Conference	
Carrick	Raiders	Pittsburgh	Allegheny	AAAA	gold & blue	District VIII	Pittsburgh City League Conference	
Catasauqua	Rough Riders	Catasauqua	Lehigh	AA	brown & white	District XI	Schuylkill Colonial League - White Division	
Cathedral Prep	Ramblers	Erie	Erie	AAAAA	orange, black & white	District X	District 10 Region 6 Division	State Champions **2000 (AAAA)**, **2012 (AAA)**, **2016 (AAAA)**, **2017 (AAAA)** & **2018 (AAAA)** - runner up 1991 (AAAA), 1999 (AAAA), 2015 (AAA) & 2020 (AAAAA)
Cedar Cliff	Colts	Camp Hill	Cumberland	AAAAA	blue & white	District III	Mid-Penn Keystone Conference	runner up 1988 (AAAA)
Cedar Crest	Falcons	Lebanon	Lebanon	AAAAAA	r. blue & gray	District III	Lancaster-Lebanon League - Section 1	
Central	Scarlet Dragons	Martinsburg	Blair	AAA	scarlet & gray	District VI	Laurel Highlands Athletic Conference - East 1 Division	
Central	Lancers	Philadelphia	Philadelphia	AAAAAA	crimson & gold	District XII	Philadelphia Public League - Liberty Conference	
Central Bucks East	Patriots	Buckingham Township	Bucks	AAAAAA	blue & red	District I	Suburban One League (National Conference)	
Central Bucks South	Titans	Warrington Township	Bucks	AAAAAA	black & m. blue	District I	Suburban One League (National Conference)	
Central Bucks West	Bucks	Doylestown	Bucks	AAAAAA	black & gold	District I	Suburban One League (National Conference)	State Champions **1991 (AAAA)**, **1997 (AAAA)**, **1998 (AAAA)** & **1999 (AAAA)** - runner up 1993 (AAAA) & 2000 (AAAA)
Central Cambria	Red Devils	Ebensburg	Cambria	AA	black & red	District VI	Laurel Highlands Athletic Conference - West 2 Division	
Central Catholic	Vikings	Pittsburgh	Allegheny	AAAAAA	blue & gold	District VII	WPIAL 6A Tri-County Five Conference	State Champions **1988 (AAAA)**, **2004 (AAAA)**, **2007 (AAAA)** & **2015 (AAAA)** - runner up 2003 (AAAA), 2013 (AAAA) & 2016 (AAAAAA)
Central Clarion	Wildcats	Clarion	Clarion	AA	navy blue & orange	District IX	District 9 - Region 1 Division	
Central Columbia	Bluejays	Bloomsburg	Columbia	AAA	blue & silver	District IV	Pennsylvania Heartland Athletic Conference (PHAC) - Division 2	
Central Dauphin	Rams	Harrisburg	Dauphin	AAAAAA	d. green & white	District III	Mid-Penn Commonwealth Conference	State Champions **2011 (AAAA)** - runner up 2019 (AAAAAA)
Central Dauphin East	Panthers	Harrisburg	Dauphin	AAAAAA	black & white	District III	Mid-Penn Commonwealth Conference	
Central Mountain	Wildcats	Mill Hall	Clinton	AAAAA	blue & white	District VI	Pennsylvania Heartland Athletic Conference (PHAC) - Division 1	
Central Valley	Warriors	Monaca	Beaver	AAAA	navy, c. blue & white	District VII	WPIAL 4A Parkway Conference	State Champions **2020 (AAA)** & **2021 (AAA)** - runner up 2014 (AAA) & 2019 (AAA)
Central York	Panthers	York	York	AAAAAA	black & orange	District III	York-Adams Interscholastic Athletic Association (YAIAA) - Division I	runner up 2020 (AAAAAA)
Chambersburg	Trojans	Chambersburg	Franklin	AAAAAA	blue & white	District III	Mid-Penn Commonwealth Conference	
Charleroi	Cougars	Charleroi	Washington	AA	black & red	District VII	WPIAL 2A Century Conference	
Chartiers-Houston	Buccaneers	Houston	Washington	A	maroon & gold	District VII	WPIAL 1A Black Hills Conference	
Chartiers Valley	Colts	Bridgeville	Allegheny	AAAA	red & blue	District VII	WPIAL 4A Parkway Conference	
Cheltenham	Panthers	Wyncote	Montgomery	AAAAAA	navy & gold	District I	Suburban One League - American Conference	runner up 2019 (AAAAA)
Chester	Clippers	Chester	Delaware	AAAAA	orange & black	District I	Delaware Valley Conference	
Chestnut Ridge	Lions	New Paris	Bedford	AA	blue & gold	District V	Laurel Highlands Athletic Conference - West 2 Division	
Chichester	Eagles	Boothwyn	Delaware	AAAAA	maroon, gray & black	District I	Delaware Valley Conference	
Clairton	Bears	Clairton	Allegheny	A	orange, black & white	District VII	WPIAL 1A Eastern Conference	State Champions **2009 (A)**, **2010 (A)**, **2011 (A)** & **2012 (A)** - runner up 2008 (A), 2014 (A) & 2016 (A)
Claysburg-Kimmel	Bulldogs	Claysburg	Blair	A	r. blue & gold	District VI	Inter County Conference - North Division	
Clearfield	Bison	Clearfield	Clearfield	AAA	red & black	District IX	Laurel Highlands Athletic Conference - East 2 Division	
Coatesville	Red Raiders	Coatesville	Chester	AAAAAA	black & red	District I	Ches-Mont League - National Conference	runner up 2012 (AAAA)
Cocalico	Eagles	Denver	Lancaster	AAAAA	blue & white	District III	Lancaster-Lebanon League - Section 4	
Cochranton	Cardinals	Cochranton	Crawford	A	red & white	District X	District 10 Region 1 Division	
Columbia	Crimson Tide	Columbia	Lancaster	AA	crimson & gold	District III	Lancaster-Lebanon League - Section 5	
Columbia-Montour Vo-Tech	Rams	Bloomsburg	Columbia	AAAA	green & gold	District IV	Northern Tier Small Conference	
Conemaugh Township	Indians	Davidsville	Somerset	A	black, red & white	District V	Heritage Conference	
Conemaugh Valley	Bluejays	Johnstown	Cambria	A	blue & white	District VI	Heritage Conference	
Conestoga	Pioneers	Berwyn	Chester	AAAAAA	garnet & gray	District I	Central Athletic League	
Conestoga Valley	Buckskins	Lancaster	Lancaster	AAAAA	red & blue	District III	Lancaster-Lebanon League - Section 2	runner up 1991 (AAA)
Conneaut	Eagles	Linesville	Crawford	AAA	black, silver & blue	District X	District 10 Region 4 Division	
Connellsville	Falcons	Connellsville	Fayette	AAAA	blue & white	District VII	WPIAL 4A Big Seven Conference	
Conrad Weiser	Scouts	Robesonia	Berks	AAAA	blue & white	District III	Lancaster-Lebanon League - Section 4	
Conwell–Egan	Eagles	Fairless Hills	Bucks	AAA	blue & white	District XII	Philadelphia Catholic League - Blue Division	
Cornell	Raiders	Coraopolis	Allegheny	A	blue & gold	District VII	WPIAL 1A Black Hills Conference	
Corry	Beavers	Corry	Erie	AAA	black & orange	District X	District 10 Region 5 Division	
Coudersport	Falcons	Coudersport	Potter	A	purple & white	District IX	District 9 - Region 3 Division	
Council Rock North	Indians	Newtown	Bucks	AAAAAA	blue & white	District I	Suburban One League - Continental Conference	
Council Rock South	Golden Hawks	Holland	Bucks	AAAAAA	navy & gold	District I	Suburban One League - Continental Conference	
Cowanesque Valley	Indians	Westfield	Tioga	AAA	navy & gold	District IV	Northern Tier Small Conference	
Crestwood	Comets	Mountain Top	Luzerne	AAAA	red, white & black	District II	Wyoming Valley Conference - Division 1	
Cumberland Valley	Eagles	Mechanicsburg	Cumberland	AAAAAA	red & white	District III	Mid-Penn Commonwealth Conference	State Champions **1992 (AAAA)**
Curwensville	Golden Tide	Curwensville	Clearfield	A	black, gold & white	District IX	Inter County Conference - North Division	

=== D ===
School	Team	City/Town	County	Class	Colors	District	Conference/League	State Championships
Dallas	Mountaineers	Dallas	Luzerne	AAAA	navy, l blue & white	District II	Wyoming Valley Conference - Division 1	State Champions **1993 (AA)** - runner up 2019 & 2023 (AAAA)
Dallastown	Wildcats	Dallastown	York	AAAAAA	blue & white	District III	York-Adams Interscholastic Athletic Association (YAIAA) - Division I	
Daniel Boone	Blazers	Birdsboro	Berks	AAAA	c. blue, navy & white	District III	Lancaster-Lebanon League - Section 3	
Danville	Ironmen	Danville	Montour	AAA	purple, orange & white	District IV	Pennsylvania Heartland Athletic Conference (PHAC) - Division 2	
Deer Lakes	Lancers	Russellton	Allegheny	AAA	green & gold	District VII	WPIAL 3A Allegheny Six Conference	
Delaware Valley	Warriors	Milford	Pike	AAAAA	black & white	District II	Lackawanna Interscholastic Athletic Association (LIAA) - Division 1	
Delone Catholic	Squires	McSherrystown	Adams	AA	black & gold	District III	York-Adams Interscholastic Athletic Association (YAIAA) - Division III	
Derry	Trojans	Derry	Westmoreland	AA	blue & gold	District VII	WPIAL 2A Allegheny Conference	
Donegal	Indians	Mount Joy	Lancaster	AAAA	green & white	District III	Lancaster-Lebanon League - Section 4	
Dover	Eagles	Dover	York	AAAAA	red, white & black	District III	York-Adams Interscholastic Athletic Association (YAIAA) - Division II	
Downingtown East	Cougars	Exton	Chester	AAAAAA	r. blue & gold	District I	Ches-Mont League - National Conference	State Champions **1996 (AAAA)** - runner up 1994 (AAAA) both as Downingtown High
Downingtown West	Whippets	Downingtown	Chester	AAAAAA	r. blue & gold	District I	Ches-Mont League - National Conference	State Champions **1996 (AAAA)** - runner up 1994 (AAAA) both as Downingtown High
DuBois	Beavers	DuBois	Clearfield	AAAA	black, red & white	District IX	District 9 - Region 1 Division	
Dunmore	Bucks	Dunmore	Lackawanna	AA	crimson & blue	District II	Lackawanna Interscholastic Athletic Association (LIAA) - Division 2	State Champions **1989 (A)** - runner up 2007 (AA), 2012 (A) & 2014 (AA)

=== E ===
School	Team	City/Town	County	Class	Colors	District	Conference/League	State Championships
East Allegheny	Wild Cats	North Versailles Township	Allegheny	AAA	blue & gold	District VII	WPIAL 3A Allegheny Six Conference	runner up 1992 (AA)
Eastern Lebanon County (ELCO)	Raiders	Myerstown	Lebanon	AAAA	navy & gold	District III	Lancaster-Lebanon League - Section 4	
Eastern York	Golden Knights	Wrightsville	York	AAAA	navy & gold	District III	York-Adams Interscholastic Athletic Association (YAIAA) - Division II	
Easton	Rovers	Easton	Northampton	AAAAAA	red, black & white	District XI	Eastern Pennsylvania Conference - South	
East Pennsboro	Panthers	Enola	Cumberland	AAAA	black, orange & white	District III	Mid-Penn Colonial Conference	
East Stroudsburg North	TimberWolves	Dingmans Ferry	Pike	AAAA	c. blue, silver & black	District XI	Eastern Pennsylvania Conference - North	
East Stroudsburg South	Cavaliers	East Stroudsburg	Monroe	AAAAA	purple & white	District XI	Eastern Pennsylvania Conference - North	
Eisenhower	Knights	Russell	Warren	A	blue & gold	District X	District 10 Region 2 Division	
Elizabeth Forward	Warriors	Elizabeth	Allegheny	AAA	black & red	District VII	WPIAL 3A Interstate Conference	
Elizabethtown	Bears	Elizabethtown	Lancaster	AAAAA	blue & white	District III	Lancaster-Lebanon League - Section 3	
Elk County Catholic	Crusaders	St. Marys	Elk	A	maroon & gold	District IX	District 9 - Region 3 Division	
Ellwood City	Wolverines	Ellwood City	Lawrence	AA	blue & white	District VII	WPIAL 2A Midwestern Conference	
Emmaus	Hornets	Emmaus	Lehigh	AAAAAA	green & gold	District XI	Eastern Pennsylvania Conference - South	
Ephrata	Mountaineers	Ephrata	Lancaster	AAAAA	purple & gold	District III	Lancaster-Lebanon League - Section 3	
Erie	Royals	Erie	Erie	AAAAAA	purple & gold	District X	District 10 Region 6 Division	
Everett	Warriors	Everett	Bedford	AA	red & white	District V	Inter County Conference - South Division	
Executive Education Academy	Raptors	Allentown	Lehigh	AA	blue & gold	District XI	independent	
Exeter Township	Eagles	Reading	Berks	AAAAA	blue & white	District III	Lancaster-Lebanon League - Section 2	

=== F ===
School	Team	City/Town	County	Class	Colors	District	Conference/League	State Championships
Fairfield	Green Knights	Fairfield	Adams	A	green, white & black	District III	York-Adams Interscholastic Athletic Association (YAIAA) - Division III	
Fairview	Tigers	Fairview	Erie	AAA	black & red	District X	District 10 Region 5 Division	
Farrell	Steelers	Farrell	Mercer	AA	blue & gold	District X	District 10 Region 3 Division	State Champions **1995 (A)**, **1996 (A)**, **2018 (A)** & **2019 (A)** - runner up 1990 (A) & 2015 (A)
Father Judge	Crusaders	Philadelphia	Philadelphia	AAAAAA	red, c. blue & white	District XII	Philadelphia Catholic League - Red Division	
Fleetwood	Tigers	Fleetwood	Berks	AAAA	red, white & gray	District III	Lancaster-Lebanon League - Section 3	
Forest Hills	Rangers	Sidman	Cambria	AA	green & gold	District VI	Laurel Highlands Athletic Conference - West 2 Division	runner up 1994 (AA)
Fort Cherry	Rangers	McDonald	Allegheny	A	red, gray & white	District VII	WPIAL 1A Black Hills Conference	
Fort LeBoeuf	Bison	Waterford	Erie	AAA	r. blue, white & red	District X	District 10 Region 5 Division	
Fox Chapel	Foxes	Pittsburgh	Allegheny	AAAAA	black, red & white	District VII	WPIAL 5A Northeast Conference	
Frankford	Pioneers	Philadelphia	Philadelphia	AAAAA	crimson, gold & navy	District XII	Philadelphia Public League - Liberty Conference	
Franklin	Knights	Franklin	Venango	AAA	black, red & white	District X	District 10 Region 4 Division	
Franklin Regional	Panthers	Murrysville	Westmoreland	AAAAA	blue & gold	District VII	WPIAL 5A Big East Conference	State Champions **2005 (AAA)**
Frazier	Commodores	Perryopolis	Fayette	A	red & white	District VII	WPIAL 1A Eastern Conference	
Freedom	Bulldogs	Freedom	Beaver	AA	red & white	District VII	WPIAL 2A Midwestern Conference	
Freedom	Patriots	Bethlehem	Lehigh	AAAAAA	black & gold	District XI	Eastern Pennsylvania Conference - South	
Freeport	Yellowjackets	Freeport	Armstrong & Butler	AAA	blue & gold	District VII	WPIAL 3A Allegheny Six Conference	

=== G ===
School	Team	City/Town	County	Class	Colors	District	Conference/League	State Championships
Garden Spot	Spartans	New Holland	Lancaster	AAAAA	blue & gray	District III	Lancaster-Lebanon League - Section 3	
Garnet Valley	Jaguars	Glen Mills	Delaware	AAAAAA	maroon, white & black	District I	Central Athletic League	runner up 2007 (AAA)
Gateway	Gators	Monroeville	Allegheny	AAAAA	black & gold	District VII	WPIAL 5A Big East Conference	runner up 2017 (AAAAA)
General McLane	Lancers	Edinboro	Erie	AAA	red, white, silver & black	District X	District 10 Region 5 Division	State Champions **2006 (AAA)**
George Washington	Eagles	Philadelphia	Philadelphia	AAAAAA	blue & gold	District XII	Philadelphia Public -National Conference	
Gettysburg	Warriors	Gettysburg	Adams	AAAAA	maroon & white	District III	Mid-Penn Colonial Conference	
Girard	Yellowjackets	Girard	Erie	AAA	scarlet & gold	District X	District 10 Region 5 Division	
Glendale	Vikings	Flinton	Cambria	A	blue & gold	District VI	Inter County Conference - North Division	
Governor Mifflin	Mustangs	Shillington	Berks	AAAAA	maroon & gold	District III	Lancaster-Lebanon League - Section 2	
Greater Johnstown	Trojans	Johnstown	Cambria	AAAA	black & c. blue	District VI	Laurel Highlands Athletic Conference - West 1 Division	
Greater Latrobe	Wildcats	Latrobe	Westmoreland	AAAA	orange & black	District VII	WPIAL 4A Big Seven Conference	
Great Valley	Patriots	Malvern	Chester	AAAAA	l.blue & gray	District I	Ches-Mont League - American Conference	
Greencastle-Antrim	Blue Devils	Greencastle	Franklin	AAAAA	blue & gold	District III	Mid-Penn Colonial Conference	
Greensburg Central Catholic	Centurions	Greensburg	Westmoreland	A	maroon & gray	District VII	WPIAL 1A Eastern Conference	runner up 2009 (AA)
Greensburg-Salem	Golden Lions	Greensburg	Westmoreland	AAA	brown, gold & white	District VII	WPIAL 3A Interstate Conference	
Greenville	Trojans	Greenville	Mercer	AA	blue & gold	District X	District 10 Region 3 Conference	
Grove City	Eagles	Grove City	Mercer	AAA	gold & black	District X	District 10 Region 3 Conference	runner up 2004 (AA)

=== H ===
School	Team	City/Town	County	Class	Colors	District	Conference/League	State Championships
Halifax	Wildcats	Halifax	Dauphin	A	black & gold	District III	Mid-Penn Liberty Conference	
Hamburg	Hawks	Hamburg	Berks	AAA	red & white	District III	Lancaster-Lebanon League - Section 5	
Hampton	Talbots	Allison Park	Allegheny	AAAA	blue & gold	District VII	WPIAL 4A Greater Allegheny Conference	
Hanover	Nighthawks	York	York	AAA	black & orange	District III	York-Adams Interscholastic Athletic Association (YAIAA) - Division III	
Hanover Area	Hawks	Hanover	Luzerne	AAA	blue & white	District II	Wyoming Valley Conference - Division 2	State Champions **1990 (AA)** - runner up 1991 (AA)
Harbor Creek	Huskies	Erie	Erie	AAA	black & orange	District X	District 10 Region 5 Division	
Harrisburg	Cougars	Harrisburg	Dauphin	AAAAAA	black & silver	District III	Mid-Penn Commonwealth Conference	runner up 2016 (AAAAA), 2018 (AAAAAA) & 2022 (AAAAAA)
Harriton	Rams	Rosemont	Montgomery	AAAAA	red, white & black	District I	Central Athletic League	
Harry S. Truman	Tigers	Levittown	Bucks	AAAAAA	black & v. gold	District I	Suburban One League - Continental Conference	
Hatboro-Horsham	Hatters	Horsham	Montgomery	AAAAA	red & black	District I	Suburban One League - Continental Conference	
Haverford	Fords	Haverford	Delaware	AAAAAA	cardinal & gold	District I	Central Athletic Conference	
Hazleton	Cougars	Hazleton	Luzerne	AAAAAA	scarlet, silver & white	District II	Wyoming Valley Conference - Division 1	
Hempfield	Black Knights	Landisville	Lancaster	AAAAAA	red & black	District III	Lancaster-Lebanon League - Section 1	
Hempfield Area	Spartans	Hempfield Township	Westmoreland	AAAAA	r. blue, silver & white	District VII	WPIAL 5A Big East Conference	
Hershey	Trojans	Hershey	Dauphin	AAAAA	blue & orange	District III	Mid-Penn Keystone Conference	
Hickory	Hornets	Hermitage	Mercer	AAA	black & red	District X	District 10 Region 3 Conference	State Champions **1989 (AA)**
Highlands	Golden Rams	Natrona Heights	Allegheny	AAAA	brown, gold & white	District VII	WPIAL 4A Greater Allegheny Conference	
Hollidaysburg	Golden Tigers	Hollidaysburg	Blair	AAAAA	blue, gold & white	District VI (competes in District VII)	independent	
Holy Cross	Crusaders	Dunmore	Lackawanna	AA	green, silver & black	District II	Lackawanna Interscholastic Athletic Association (LIAA) - Division 3	
Holy Redeemer	Royals	Wilkes-Barre	Luzerne	AA	red, v gold & white	District II	Wyoming Valley Conference - Division 2	
Homer-Center	Wildcats	Homer City	Indiana	A	black & white	District VI	Heritage Conference	runner up 2017 (A)
Honesdale	Hornets	Honesdale	Wayne	AAAA	red & black	District II	Lackawanna Interscholastic Athletic Association (LIAA) - Division 2	
Hopewell	Vikings	Aliquippa	Beaver	AAA	blue & gold	District VII	WPIAL 3A Western Hills Conference	State Champions **2002 (AAA)**
Hughesville	Spartans	Hughesville	Lycoming	AA	f. green & white	District IV	Pennsylvania Heartland Athletic Conference (PHAC) - Division 3	
Huntingdon	Bearcats	Huntingdon	Huntingdon	AAA	blue & red	District VI	Laurel Highlands Athletic Conference - East 1 Division	

=== I ===
School	Team	City/Town	County	Class	Colors	District	Conference/League	State Championships
**Imani Christian Academy**	Saints	Pittsburgh	Allegheny	AA	black & gold	District VII	**WPIAL 2A Allegheny Conference**	
**Imhotep Charter**	Panthers	Philadelphia	Philadelphia	AAAAA	red & black	District XII	**Philadelphia Public League - Independence Conference**	State Champions **2015 (AAA)** - runner up 2013 (AA), 2016 (AAAA), 2017 (AAAA), 2018 (AAAA), 2021 (AAAAA) & 2022 (AAAAA)
**Indiana**	Little Indians	Indiana	Indiana	AAAA	black & red	District VII	**WPIAL 4A Greater Allegheny Conference**	
**Interboro**	Buccaneers	Prospect Park	Delaware	AAAA	black & gold	District I	**Delaware Valley Conference**	
**Iroquois**	Braves	Erie	Erie	A	black & gold	District X	**District 10 Region 2 Division**	

=== J ===
School	Team	City/Town	County	Class	Colors	District	Conference/League	State Championships
James Buchanan	Rockets	Mercersburg	Franklin	AAAA	green & white	District III	Mid-Penn Liberty Conference	
Jeannette	Jayhawks	Jeannette	Westmoreland	A	blue & red	District VII	WPIAL 1A Eastern Conference	State Champions **2007 (AA)** & **2017 (A)** - runner up 2006 (AA) & 2020 (A)
Jefferson-Morgan	Rockets	Jefferson	Greene	A	black & orange	District VII	WPIAL 1A Tri-County South Conference	
Jenkintown	Drakes	Jenkintown	Montgomery	A	red & navy	District I	Bicentennial Athletic League	
Jersey Shore	Bulldogs	Jersey Shore	Lycoming	AAAA	black & orange	District IV	Pennsylvania Heartland Athletic Conference (PHAC) - Division 1	runner up 2020 (AAAA)
Jim Thorpe	Olympians	Jim Thorpe	Carbon	AAA	red, blue & white	District XI	Schuylkill Colonial League - Red Division	
John Bartram	Braves	Philadelphia	Philadelphia	AAAA	maroon & gray	District XII	Philadelphia Public League - Independence Conference	
Jules Mastbaum	Panthers	Philadelphia	Philadelphia	AAAAA	red, white & blue	District XII	Philadelphia Public -American Conference	
Juniata	Indians	Mifflintown	Juniata	AAAA	red & blue	District VI	Mid-Pen Conference - Liberty Division	
Juniata Valley	Hornets	Alexandria	Huntingdon	A	green & white	District VI	Inter County Conference - North Division	

=== K ===
School	Team	City/Town	County	Class	Colors	District	Conference/League	State Championships
Kane	Wolves	Kane	McKean	AA	blue, red & white	District IX	District 9 - Region 2 Division	
Karns City	Gremlins	Karns City	Butler	AA	purple, gold & white	District IX	District 9 - Region 1 Division	
Kennard-Dale	Rams	Fawn Grove	York	AAAA	blue & gold	District III	York-Adams Interscholastic Athletic Association (YAIAA) - Division II	
Kennedy Catholic	Golden Eagles	Hermitage	Mercer	A	maroon & gold	District X	District 10 Region 1 Division	
Kennett	Blue Demons	Kenentt Square	Chester	AAAAA	r.blue, white & black	District I	Ches-Mont League - American Conference	
Kensington	Tigers	Kensington	Philadelphia	AAAAAA	black & gold	District XII	Philadelphia Public -National Conference	
Keystone	Panthers	Knox	Clarion	A	black & gold	District IX	District 9 - Region 2 Division	runner up 1989 (A)
Keystone Oaks	Golden Eagles	Pittsburgh	Allegheny	AA	v. gold, white & black	District VII	WPIAL 2A Century Conference	
KIPP DuBois Collegiate Academy	Lions	Philadelphia	Philadelphia	AAA	blue & gold	District XII	Philadelphia Public League - American Conference	
Kiski	Cavaliers	Vandergrift	Westmoreland	AAAA	gold, white & navy blue	District VII	WPIAL 4A Greater Allegheny Conference	
Knoch	Knights	Saxonburg	Butler	AAA	blue, gold & white	District VII	WPIAL 3A Allegheny Six Conference	
Kutztown	Cougars	Kutztown	Berks	AAA	blue & white	District III	Lancaster-Lebanon League - Section 5	

=== L ===
School	Team	City/Town	County	Class	Colors	District	Conference/League	State Championships
Lackawanna Trail	Lions	Factoryville	Lackawanna	A	red & white	District II	Lackawanna Interscholastic Athletic Association (LIAA) - Division 3	runner up 2018 (A)
Lakeland	Chiefs	Jermyn	Lackawanna	AA	red, white & blue	District II	Lackawanna Interscholastic Athletic Association (LIAA) - Division 2	
Lake-Lehman	Knights	Lehman Township	Luzerne	AAA	black & gold	District II	Wyoming Valley Conference - Division 2	
Lakeview	Sailors	Stoneboro	Mercer	A	red & black	District X	District 10 Region 1 Division	
Lampeter-Strasburg	Pioneers	Lampeter	Lancaster	AAAA	blue & white	District III	Lancaster-Lebanon League - Section 4	
Lancaster Catholic	Crusaders	Lancaster	Lancaster	AAA	purple & gold	District III	Lancaster-Lebanon League - Section 5	State Champions **2009 (AA)** & **2011 (AA)**
Lansdale Catholic	Crusaders	Lansdale	Montgomery	AAA	green & gold	District XII	Philadelphia Catholic League - Blue Division	State Champions **2004 (AA)**
La Salle College	Explorers	Wyndmoor	Philadelphia	AAAAAA	blue & gold	District XII	Philadelphia Catholic League - Red Division)	State Champions **2009 (AAAA)** runner up 2010 (AAAA)
Laurel	Spartans	New Castle	Lawrence	A	green & white	District VII	WPIAL 1A Big Seven Conference	
Laurel Highlands	Mustangs	Uniontown	Fayette	AAAA	red, white & blue	District VII	WPIAL 4A Big Seven Conference	
Lebanon	Cedars	Lebanon	Lebanon	AAAAAA	blue & red	District III	Lancaster-Lebanon League - Section 2	
Leechburg	Blue Devils	Leechburg	Armstrong	A	blue & gray	District VII	WPIAL 1A Eastern Conference	
Lehighton	Indians	Lehighton	Carbon	AAA	maroon & white	District XI	Schuylkill Colonial League - Gold Division	
Lewisburg	Green Dragons	Lewisburg	Union	AAA	green & white	District IV	Pennsylvania Heartland Athletic Conference (PHAC) - Division 2	
Liberty	Hurricanes	Bethlehem	Northampton	AAAAAA	blue, red & white	District XI	Eastern Pennsylvania Conference - South	State Champions **2008 (AAAA)** - runner up 2005 (AAAA) & 2006 (AAAA)
Ligonier Valley	Rams	Ligonier	Westmoreland	AA	black & red	District VII	WPIAL 2A Allegheny Conference	
Line Mountain	Eagles	Herndon	Northumberland	AA	blue & gold	District IV	Mid-Penn Liberty Conference	
Littlestown	Thunderbolts	Littlestown	Adams	AAA	blue & gold	District III	York-Adams Interscholastic Athletic Association (YAIAA) - Division III	
Louis E. Dieruff	Huskies	Allentown	Lehigh	AAAAAA	blue & gray	District XI	Eastern Pennsylvania Conference - North	
Lower Dauphin	Falcons	Hummelstown	Dauphin	AAAAA	blue & white	District III	Mid-Penn Keystone Conference	runner up 1995 (AAAA)
Lower Merion	Aces	Ardmore	Montgomery	AAAAAA	maroon & white	District I	Central Athletic Conference	
Lower Moreland	Lions	Huntingdon Valley	Montgomery	AAAA	gold & navy	District I	Bicentennial Athletic League	
Loyalsock Township	Lancers	Williamsport	Lycoming	AAA	maroon & light blue	District IV	Pennsylvania Heartland Athletic Conference (PHAC) - Division 3	

=== M ===
School	Team	City/Town	County	Class	Colors	District	Conference/League	State Championships
McCaskey	Red Tornados	Lancaster	Lancaster	AAAAAA	red & black	District III	Lancaster-Lebanon League - Section 1	
McDowell	Trojans	Erie	Erie	AAAAAA	blue & white	District X	District 10 Region 6 Division	
McGuffey	Highlanders	Claysville	Washington	AA	blue & gold	District VII	WPIAL 2A Century Conference	
McKeesport	Tigers	Pittsburgh	Allegheny	AAAA	blue & red	District VII	WPIAL 4A Big Seven Conference	State Champions **1994 (AAAA)** & **2005 (AAAA)**
Mahanoy	Golden Bears	Mahanoy City	Schuylkill	A	black & gold	District XI	Schuylkill Colonial League - Blue Division	
Manheim Central	Barons	Manheim	Lancaster	AAAA	maroon & gray	District III	Lancaster-Lebanon League - Section 2	State Champions **2003 (AAA)** - runner up 2004 (AAA), 2009 (AAA) & 2018 (AAAAA)
Manheim Township	Blue Streaks	Lancaster	Lancaster	AAAAAA	blue & white	District III	Lancaster-Lebanon League - Section 1	
Mapletown	Maples	Greensboro	Greene	A	black & gold	District VII	WPIAL 1A Tri-County South Conference	
Maplewood	Tigers	Guys Mills	Crawford	A	black & gold	District X	District 10 Region 1 Division	
Marian Catholic	Colts	Tamaqua	Schuylkill	A	blue & gold	District XI	Schuylkill Colonial League - Blue Division	runner up **1990 (A)**
Marion Center	Stingers	Marion Center	Indiana	A	green & gold	District VI	Heritage Conference	
Marple Newtown	Fightin' Tigers	Newtown Square	Delaware	AAAAA	black & orange	District I	Central Athletic Conference	
Mars	Fightin' Planets	Mars	Butler	AAAA	blue & gold	District VII	WPIAL 4A Greater Allegheny Conference	
Martin Luther King	Cougars	Philadelphia	Philadelphia	AAAAA	purple, gold & black	District XII	Philadelphia Public League - Liberty Conference	
Mastery Charter North	Pumas	Philadelphia	Philadelphia	AAAAA	blue & black	District XII	Philadelphia Public League - Liberty Conference	
Meadville	Bulldogs	Meadville	Crawford	AAAA	blue & gold	District X	District 10 Region 4 Division	
Mechanicsburg	Wildcats	Mecahnicsburg	Cumberland	AAAAA	maroon, silver & white	District III	Mid-Penn Colonial Conference	
Mercer	Mustangs	Mercer	Mercer	A	blue & white	District X	District 10 Region 1 Division	
Mercyhurst Prep	Lakers	Erie	Erie	AA	green & white	District X	District 10 Region 2 Division	
Methacton	Warriors	Norristown	Montgomery	AAAAA	d. green, white & black	District I	Pioneer Athletic Conference - Liberty Division	
Meyersdale	Red Raiders	Meyersdale	Somerset	A	black & red	District V	Inter County Conference - South Division	
Middletown	Blue Raiders	Middletown	Dauphin	AAAA	blue & gold	District III	Mid-Penn Capital Conference	runner up 2016 (AAA), 2017 (AAA) & 2018 (AAA)
Midd-West	Mustangs	Middleburg	Snyder	AAA	black, Carolina blue & silver	District IV	Pennsylvania Heartland Athletic Conference (PHAC) - Division 3	
Mid Valley	Spartans	Throop	Lackawanna	AA	blue & white	District II	Lackawanna Interscholastic Athletic Association (LIAA) - Division 2	
Mifflinburg	Wildcats	Mifflinburg	Union	AAA	blue & white	District IV	Pennsylvania Heartland Athletic Conference (PHAC) - Division 1	
Mifflin County	Huskies	Lewistown	Mifflin	AAAAAA	purple, silver & black	District VI	Mid-Pen Conference - Keystone Division	
Milton	Black Panthers	Milton	Northumberland	AAAA	black & orange	District IV	Pennsylvania Heartland Athletic Conference (PHAC) - Division 3	
Milton Hershey	Spartans	Hershey	Dauphin	AAAA	brown & gold	District III	Mid-Penn Keystone Conference	
Minersville	Battlin' Miners	Minersville	Schuylkill	A	blue & white	District XI	Schuylkill Colonial League - White Division	
Mohawk	Warriors	Bessemer	Lawrence	AA	red, black & white	District VII	WPIAL 2A Midwestern Conference	
Monessen	Grayhounds	Monessen	Westmoreland	A	black & white	District VII	WPIAL 1A Tri-County South Conference	
Moniteau	Warriors	West Sunbury	Butler	AA	black, red & white	District IX	District 9 - Region 1 Division	
Monsignor Bonner & Prendergast	Friars	Drexel Hill	Delaware	AAAA	green & white	District XII	Philadelphia Catholic League - Blue Division	
Montgomery	Red Raiders	Montgomery	Lycoming	A	scarlet & white	District IV	Northern Tier Small Conference	
Montour	Spartans	McKees Rocks	Allegheny	AAAA	black & gold	District VII	WPIAL 4A Parkway Conference	
Montoursville	Warriors	Montoursville	Lycoming	AAA	blue & gold	District IV	Pennsylvania Heartland Athletic Conference (PHAC) - Division 2	runner up 1989 (AA)
Montrose	Meteors	Montrose	Susquehanna	AAA	maroon & white	District II	Independent	
Moon	Tigers	Pittsburgh	Allegheny	AAAAA	red, white & black	District VII	WPIAL 5A Allegheny Six Conference	runner up 1998 (AAA)
Morrisville	Bulldogs	Morrisville	Bucks	A	blue & gold	District I	Bicentennial Athletic League	
Moshannon Valley	Black Knights	Houtzdale	Clearfield	A	blue, gold & white	District VI	Inter County Conference - North Division	
Mount Carmel	Red Tornadoes	Mount Carmel	Northumberland	AAA	red & white	District IV	Pennsylvania Heartland Athletic Conference (PHAC) - Division 3	State Champions **1994 (AA)**, **1996 (AA)**, **1998 (AA)**, **2000 (AA)** & **2002 (AA)** - runner up 1999 (AA)
Mount Lebanon	Blue Devils	Mount Lebanon	Allegheny	AAAAAA	blue & gold	District VII	WPIAL 6A Tri-County Five Conference	State Champions **2021 (AAAAAA)**
Mount Pleasant	Vikings	Mount Pleasant	Westmoreland	AAA	blue & gold	District VII	WPIAL 3A Interstate Conference	
Mount Union	Trojans	Mount Union	Huntingdon	AA	blue & gold	District VI	Inter County Conference - North Division	
Muhlenberg	Muhls	Reading	Berks	AAAAA	blue & gold	District III	Lancaster Lebanon League - Section 2	
Muncy	Indians	Muncy	Lycoming	A	blue & white	District IV	Northern Tier Small Conference	
Murrell Dobbins Vo-Tech	Mustangs	Philadelphia	Philadelphia	AAAAA	red & gray	District XII	Philadelphia Public League - American Conference	

=== N ===
School	Team	City/Town	County	Class	Colors	District	Conference/League	State Championships
Nanticoke	Trojans	Nanticoke	Luzerne	AAAA	blue & red	District II	Wyoming Valley Conference - Division 2	
Nativity BVM	Green Wave	Pottsville	Schuylkill	A	green & gold	District XI	Schuylkill Colonial League - Blue Division	
Nazareth	Eagles	Nazareth	Northampton	AAAAAA	blue & white	District XI	Eastern Pennsylvania Conference - South	
Neshaminy	Redskins	Langhorne	Bucks	AAAAAA	blue & scarlet	District I	Suburban One League - National Conference	State Champions **2001 (AAAA)** - runner up 2004 (AAAA)
Neshannock	Lancers	New Castle	Lawrence	AA	red & white	District VII	WPIAL 2A Midwestern Conference	
Neumann-Goretti	Saints	Philadelphia	Philadelphia	AAA	black, white & gold	District XII	Philadelphia Catholic League - Blue Division	runner up 2022 (AAA)
New Brighton	Lions	New Brighton	Beaver	AA	red & gold	District VII	WPIAL 2A Midwestern Conference	
New Castle	Hurricanes	New Castle	Lawrence	AAAA	black & red	District VII	WPIAL 4A Parkway Conference	runner up 1998 (AAAA)
New Hope-Solebury	Lions	New Hope	Bucks	AAA	n. blue & gold	District I	Suburban One League - American Conference	
New Oxford	Colonials	New Oxford	Adams	AAAAA	red, white & blue	District III	York-Adams Interscholastic Athletic Association (YAIAA) - Division II	
Newport	Buffaloes	Newport	Perry	AA	blue & white	District III	Mid-Penn Liberty Conference	
Norristown	Eagles	Norristown	Montgomery	AAAAAA	blue & white	District I	Pioneer Athletic Conference - Liberty Division	
North Allegheny	Tigers	Pittsburgh	Allegheny	AAAAAA	black & gold	District VII	WPIAL 6A Tri-County Five Conference	State Champions **1990 (AAAA)**, **2010 (AAAA)** & **2012 (AAAA)**
Northampton	Konkrete Kids	Northampton	Northampton	AAAAAA	orange & black	District XI	Eastern Pennsylvania Conference - North	
North Catholic	Trojans	Cranberry Township	Butler	AAAA	red & gold	District VII	WPIAL 4A Greater Allegheny Conference	State Champions **2013 (A)**
North East	Grape Pickers	North East	Erie	AAA	maroon & gold	District X	District 10 Region 5 Division	
Northeast	Vikings	Philadelphia	Philadelphia	AAAAAA	black & red	District XII	Philadelphia Public League - Independence Conference	
Northeastern	Bobcats	Manchester	York	AAAAA	orange & black	District III	York-Adams Interscholastic Athletic Association (YAIAA) - Division I	
Northern Bedford	Panthers	Loysburg	Bedford	A	black & white	District V	Inter County Conference - South Division	
Northern Cambria	Colts	Northern Cambria	Cambria	A	black & gold	District VI	Heritage Conference	
Northern Lebanon	Vikings	Fredericksburg	Lebanon	AAAA	blue & gold	District III	Lancaster Lebanon League - Section 5	
Northern Lehigh	Bulldogs	Slatington	Lehigh	A	blue & white	District XI	Schuylkill Colonial League - Red Division	runner up 2003 (AA)
Northern York	Polar Bears	Dillsburg	York	AAAAA	purple & white	District III	Mid-Penn Colonial Conference	
Northgate	Flames	Pittsburgh	Allegheny	A	red & gold	District VII	WPIAL 1A Big Seven Conference	
North Hills	Indians	Pittsburgh	Allegheny	AAAAA	red & white	District VII	WPIAL 5A Northeast Conference	State Champions **1993 (AAAA)**
North Penn	Knights	Lansdale	Montgomery	AAAAAA	navy blue & l. blue	District I	Suburban One League - National Conference	State Champions **2003 (AAAA)** - runner up 2011 (AAAA)
North Penn Mansfield	Panthers	Mansfield	Tioga	AA	blue & white	District IV	Northern Tier League - Large School Division	
North Pocono	Trojans	Covington Township	Lackawanna	AAAA	red, black & white	District II	Lackawanna Interscholastic Athletic Association (LIAA) - Division 1	
North Schuylkill	Spartans	Ashland	Schuylkill	AAA	red & blue	District XI	Schuylkill Colonial League - Red Division	
North Star	Cougars	Boswell	Somerset	A	green & white	District V	Inter County Conference - South Division	
Northwest	Rangers	Shickshinny	Luzerne	A	blue & gold	District IV	Northern Tier Small Conference	
Northwestern	Wildcats	Albion	Erie	AA	black & red	District X	District 10 Region 2 Division	
Northwestern Lehigh	Tigers	New Tripoli	Lehigh	AAA	black & gold	District XI	Schuylkill Colonial League - Gold Division	
Norwin	Knights	North Huntingdon	Westmoreland	AAAAA	gold & blue	District VII	WPIAL 5A Big East Conference	
Notre Dame	Crusaders	Easton	Northampton	AAA	blue & gold	District XI	Schuylkill Colonial League - Red Division	

=== O ===
School	Team	City/Town	County	Class	Colors	District	Conference/League	State Championships
Octorara	Braves	Atglen	Chester	AAAA	n.blue, red & white	District III	Lancaster Lebanon League - Section 4	
Oil City	Oilers	Oil City	Venango	AAA	blue & white	District X	District 10 Region 4 Conference	
Old Forge	Devils	Old Forge	Lackawanna	A	navy & gold	District II	Lackawanna Interscholastic Athletic Association (LIAA) - Division 3	runner up 2013 (A)
Olney	Trojans	Philadelphia	Philadelphia	AAAAAA	blue & white	District XII	Philadelphia Public League - Independence Conference	
Otto-Eldred	Terrors	Duke Center	McKean	A	blue & gold	District IX	District 9 - Region 3 Division	
Our Lady of the Sacred Heart	Chargers	Coraopolis	Allegheny	A	purple & gold	District VII	WPIAL 1A Black Hills Conference	
Overbrook	Panthers	Philadelphia	Philadelphia	AAAA	orange & black	District XII	Philadelphia Public -National Conference	
Owen J. Roberts	Wildcats	South Pottstown	Chester	AAAAAA	red & white	District I	Pioneer Athletic Conference - Liberty Division	
Oxford	Hornets	Oxford	Chester	AAAAA	maroon & white	District I	Ches-Mont League - American Conference	

=== P ===
School	Team	City/Town	County	Class	Colors	District	Conference/League	State Championships
Palisades	Pirates	Kintnersville	Bucks	AA	purple & gold	District XI	Schuylkill Colonial League - Red Division	
Palmerton	Blue Bombers	Palmerton	Carbon	AAA	blue, black & white	District XI	Schuylkill Colonial League - White Division	
Palmyra	Cougars	Palmyra	Lebanon	AAAAA	orange & black	District III	Mid-Penn Keystone Conference	
Panther Valley	Panthers	Lansford	Carbon	AA	black & gold	District XI	Schuylkill Colonial League - White Division	
Parkland	Trojans	Allentown	Lehigh	AAAAAA	red, gray & black	District XI	Eastern Pennsylvania Conference - South	State Champions **2002 (AAAA)** - runner up 2007 (AAAA) & 2015 (AAAA)
Pen Argyl	Green Knights	Pen Argyl	Northampton	AA	k. green & white	District XI	Schuylkill Colonial League - White Division	runner up 2001 (AA)
Penn Cambria	Panthers	Cresson	Cambria	AAA	black & l. blue	District VI	Laurel Highlands Athletic Conference - West 2 Division	
Penncrest	Lions	Media	Delaware	AAAAA	black, red & gold	District I	Central Athletic League	
Penn Hills	Indians	Pittsburgh	Allegheny	AAAAA	red & gold	District VII	WPIAL 5A Northeast Conference	State Champions **1995 (AAAA)** & **2018 (AAAAA)**
Penn Manor	Comets	Millersville	Lancaster	AAAAAA	blue & gold	District III	Lancaster Lebanon League - Section 1	
Pennridge	Rams	Perkasie	Bucks	AAAAAA	black, d. green & white	District I	Suburban One League - National Conference	
Pennsbury	Falcons	Fairless Hills	Bucks	AAAAAA	black & orange	District I	Suburban One League - National Conference	
Penns Manor	Comets	Clymer	Indiana	A	blue & white	District VI	Heritage Conference	
Penns Valley	Rams	Spring Mills	Centre	AA	blue & white	District VI	Laurel Highlands Athletic Conference - East 2 Division	
Penn-Trafford	Warriors	Harrison City	Westmoreland	AAAAA	green & gold	District VII	WPIAL 5A Big East Conference	State Champions **2021 (AAAAA)**
Penn Wood	Patriots	Lansdowne	Delaware	AAAAAA	blue & red	District I	Delaware Valley League	
Pequea Valley	Braves	Kinzers	Lancaster	AAA	red & white	District III	Lancaster Lebanon League - Section 5	
Perkiomen Valley	Vikings	Collegeville	Montgomery	AAAAAA	orange & brown	District I	Pioneer Athletic Conference - Liberty Division	
Perry Traditional Academy	Commodores	Pittsburgh	Allegheny	AA	blue & white	District VIII	Pittsburgh City League Conference	State Champions **1989 (AAA)** - runner up 1997 (AAA)
Peters Township	Indians	McMurray	Washington	AAAAA	red & white	District VII	WPIAL 5A Allegheny Six Conference	
Philipsburg-Osceola	Mountaineers	Philipsburg	Centre & Clearfield	AA	blue & white	District VI	Laurel Highlands Athletic Conference - East 2 Division	
Phoenixville	Phantoms	Phoenixville	Chester	AAAAA	purple & white	District I	Pioneer Athletic Conference - Frontier Division	
Pine Grove	Cardinals	Pine Grove	Schuylkill	AAA	red & gray	District XI	Schuylkill Colonial League - Red Division	
Pine Richland	Rams	Pittsburgh	Allegheny	AAAAA	green & white	District VII	WPIAL 5A Northeast Conference	State Champions **2017 (AAAAAA)**, **2020 (AAAAA)** & **2022 (AAAAA)** - runner up 2003 (AAA) & 2014 (AAAA)
Pittston	Patriots	Pittston	Luzerne	AAAAA	red, navy & white	District II	Wyoming Valley Conference - Division 2	
Pleasant Valley	Bears	Brodheadsville	Monroe	AAAAA	blue & white	District XI	Eastern Pennsylvania Conference - North	
Plum	Mustangs	Plum	Allegheny	AAAAA	purple & gold	District VII	WPIAL 5A Big East Conference	
Plymouth-Whitemarsh	Colonials	Plymouth Meeting	Montgomery	AAAAA	blue, red & white	District I	Suburban One League - American Conference	
Pocono Mountain East	Cardinals	Swiftwater	Monroe	AAAAA	red, black & white	District XI	Eastern Pennsylvania Conference - North	
Pocono Mountain West	Panthers	Pocono Summit	Monroe	AAAAA	blue & white	District XI	Eastern Pennsylvania Conference - North	
Pope John Paul II	Golden Panthers	Royersford	Montgomery	AAAA	m. blue & gold	District I	Pioneer Athletic Conference - Frontier Division	
Portage	Mustangs	Portage	Cambria	A	green & white	District VI	Heritage Conference	
Port Allegany	Gators	Port Allegany	McKean	A	black & orange	District IX	District 9 - Region 2 Division	
Pottsgrove	Falcons	Pottsgrove	Montgomery	AAAA	maroon, black & white	District I	Pioneer Athletic Conference - Frontier Division	
Pottstown	Trojans	Pottstown	Montgomery	AAAA	blue & white	District I	Pioneer Athletic Conference - Frontier Division	
Pottsville	Crimson Tide	Pottsville	Schuylkill	AAAA	crimson & white	District XI	Schuylkill Colonial League - Gold Division	runner up 2005 (AAA), 2006 (AAA)
Punxsutawney	Chucks	Punxsutawney	Jefferson	AAA	red & white	District IX	District 9 - Region 1 Division	
Purchase Line	Red Dragons	Commodore	Indiana	A	red, gray & white	District VI	Heritage Conference	

=== Q ===
School	Team	City/Town	County	Class	Colors	District	Conference/League	State Championships
**Quakertown**	Panthers	Quakertown	Bucks	AAAAAA	d. blue & white	District I	**Suburban One League - Continental Conference**	
**Quaker Valley**	Quakers	Leetsdale	Allegheny	AAA	black, gold & white	District VII	**WPIAL 3A Western Hills Conference**	State Champions **2017 (AAA)**

=== R ===
School	Team	City/Town	County	Class	Colors	District	Conference/League	State Championships
Radnor	Red Raiders	Radnor	Delaware	AAAAA	maroon & white	District I	Central Athletic League	
Reading	Red Knights	Reading	Berks	AAAAAA	black & red	District III	Lancaster Lebanon League - Section 1	
Redbank Valley	Bulldogs	New Bethlehem	Clarion	A	red & white	District IX	District 9 - Region 2 Division	runner up 2021 (A)
Red Land	Patriots	Lewisberry	York	AAAAA	red & blue	District III	Mid-Penn Keystone Conference	
Red Lion	Lions	Red Lion	York	AAAAAA	black & gold	District III	York-Adams Interscholastic Athletic Association (YAIAA) - Division I	
Renaissance Academy	Knights	Phoenixville	Chester	A	black, burgandy & Silver	District I	independent	
Reynolds	Raiders	Greenville	Mercer	A	blue & gray	District X	District 10 Region 1 Conference	
Richland	Rams	Johnstown	Cambria	AA	red, blue & white	District VI	Laurel Highlands Athletic Conference - West 1 Division	
Ridgway	Elkers	Ridgway	Elk	AA	maroon & white	District IX	District 9 - Region 2 Division	
Ridley	Green Raiders	Folsom	Delaware	AAAAAA	green & white	District I	Central Athletic League	runner up 1990 (AAAA)
Ringgold	Rams	Monongahela	Washington	AAAA	blue & gold	District VII	WPIAL 4A Big Seven Conference	
Riverside	Panthers	Ellwood City	Beaver	AA	green, white & black	District VII	WPIAL 2A Midwestern Conference	runner up 2010 (A)
Riverside	Vikings	Taylor	Lackawanna	AA	red & blue	District II	Lackawanna Interscholastic Athletic Association (LIAA) - Division 3	runner up 1997 (A)
River Valley	Panthers	Blairsville	Indiana & Westmoreland	AA	black & aero blue	District VI	Heritage Conference	
Riverview	Raiders	Pittsburgh	Allegheny	A	blue & gold	District VII	WPIAL 1A Eastern Conference	
Rochester	Rams	Rochester	Beaver	A	blue & white	District VII	WPIAL 1A Big Seven Conference	State Champion **2000 (A)** & **2001 (A)** - runner up 1991 (A), 2002 (A) & 2004 (A)
Roman Catholic	Cahillites	Philadelphia	Philadelphia	AAAAA	purple & gold	District XII	Philadelphia Catholic League - Red Division	
Roxborough	Indians	Philadelphia	Philadelphia	AAAAA	navy & white	District XII	Philadelphia Public -National Conference	

=== S ===
School	Team	City/Town	County	Class	Colors	District	Conference/League	State Championships
Saegertown	Panthers	Saegertown	Crawford	A	blue & gold	District X	District 10 Region 1 Conference	
Saint Joseph's Prep	Hawks	Philadelphia	Philadelphia	AAAAAA	crimson & gray	District XII	Philadelphia Catholic League - Red Division	State Champions **2013 (AAAA)**, **2014 (AAAA)**, **2016 (AAAAAA)**, **2018 (AAAAAA)**, **2019 (AAAAAA)**, **2020 (AAAAAA)** & **2022 (AAAAAA)** - runner up 2017 (AAAAAA) & 2021 (AAAAAA)
Saint Marys	Flying Dutch	Saint Marys	Elk	AAA	red & blue	District IX	District 9 - Region 1 Division	
Salisbury	Falcons	Allentown	Lehigh	AA	blue & white	District XI	Schuylkill Colonial League - Red Division	
Samuel Fels	Panthers	Philadelphia	Philadelphia	AAAAA	black & white	District XII	Philadelphia Public League - American Conference	
Saucon Valley	Panthers	Hellertown	Northampton	AAA	black, red & white	District XI	Schuylkill Colonial League - Gold Division	
Sayre	Redskins	Sayre	Bradford	A	blue, red & white	District IV	Northern Tier - Small Conference	
School of the Future	Firebirds	Philadelphia	Philadelphia	AAAA	red & gold	District XII	Philadelphia Public -National Conference	
Schuylkill Haven	Hurricanes	Schuylkill Haven	Schuylkill	AA	blue & gold	District XI	Schuylkill Colonial League - White Division	State Champions **1991 (A)** - runner up 1992 (A)
Schuylkill Valley	Panthers	Leesport	Berks	AAA	red, black & white	District III	Lancaster Lebanon League - Section 5	
Scranton	Knights	Scranton	Lackawanna	AAAAA	cardinal & gold	District II	Lackawanna Interscholastic Athletic Association (LIAA) - Division 1	
Scranton Prep	Cavaliers	Scranton	Lackawanna	AAA	purple & gold	District II	Lackawanna Interscholastic Athletic Association (LIAA) - Division 1	
Selinsgrove	Seals	Selinsgrove	Snyder	AAAA	red, blue & white	District IV	Pennsylvania Heartland Athletic Conference (PHAC) - Division 1	State Champions **2009 (AAA)**
Seneca	Bobcats	Erie	Erie	AA	blue & white	District X	District 10 Region 2 Division	
Seneca Valley	Raiders	Harmony	Butler	AAAAAA	black, c. blue & white	District VII	WPIAL 6A Tri-County Five Conference	
Serra Catholic	Eagles	Pittsburgh	Allegheny	AA	cardinal & gold	District VII	WPIAL 2A Allegheny Conference	runner up 2007 (A) & 2021 (AA)
Seton-La Salle	Rebels	Pittsburgh	Allegheny	AAA	green & gold	District VII	WPIAL 3A Western Hills Conference	runner up 1990 (AAA) & 2002 (AA)
Shady Side Academy	Indians	Pittsburgh	Allegheny	AAA	blue & gold	District VII	WPIAL 3A Allegheny Six Conference	runner up 1998 (AA)
Shaler	Titans	Pittsburgh	Allegheny	AAAAA	blue & red	District VII	WPIAL 5A Northeast Conference	
Shamokin	Indians	Coal Township	Northumberland	AAAA	purple & white	District IV	Pennsylvania Heartland Athletic Conference (PHAC) - Division 1	
Sharon	Tigers	Sharon	Mercer	AAA	black, orange & white	District X	District 10 Region 3 Division	runner up 1994 (AAA) & 1995 (AAA)
Sharpsville	Blue Devils	Sharpsville	Mercer	AA	blue, white & red	District X	District 10 Region 3 Division	State Champions **1997 (A)**
Sheffield	Wolverines	Sheffield	Warren	A	black & orange	District IX	District 9 Region 3 Division	
Shenandoah Valley	Blue Devils	Shenandoah	Schuylkill	AA	c. blue, blue & white	District XI	Schuylkill Colonial League - Blue Division	State Champions **1992 (A)**
Shenango	Wildcats	New Castle	Lawrence	A	blue & gold	District VII	WPIAL 1A Big Seven Conference	
Shikellamy	Braves	Sunbury	Northumberland	AAAA	maroon, blue & white	District IV	Pennsylvania Heartland Athletic Conference (PHAC) - Division 1	
Shippensburg	Greyhounds	Shippensburg	Cumberland	AAAAA	maroon & gray	District III	Mid-Penn Colonial Conference	
Simon Gratz	Bulldogs	Philadelphia	Philadelphia	AAAAA	red, white & black	District XII	Philadelphia Public League - Independence Conference	
Slippery Rock	Rockets	Slippery Rock	Butler	AAA	red & gray	District X	District 10 Region 3 Division	
Smethport	Hubbers	Smethport	McKean	A	orange, black & white	District IX	District 9 Region 2 Division	runner up 1992 (A)
Solanco	Golden Mules	Quarryville	Lancaster	AAAAA	black & gold	District III	Lancaster Lebanon League - Section 3	
Somerset	Eagles	Somerset	Somerset	AAA	orange & black	District V	Laurel Highlands Athletic Conference - West 1 Division	
Souderton	Indians	Souderton	Montgomery	AAAAAA	red & white	District I	Suburban One League - Continental Conference	
South Allegheny	Gladiators	Pittsburgh	Allegheny	AAA	blue & gold	District VII	WPIAL 3A Interstate Conference	
Southern Columbia	Tigers	Catawissa	Columbia	AA	black & gold	District IV	Pennsylvania Heartland Athletic Conference (PHAC) - Division 2	State Champions **1994 (A)**, **2002 (A)**, **2003 (A)**, **2004 (A)**, **2005 (A)**, **2006 (A)**, **2015 (AA)**, **2017 (AA)**, **2018 (AA)**, **2019 (AA)**, **2020 (AA)**, **2021 (AA)**, **2022 (AA)**, **2023 (AA)** & **2025 (AA)** - runner up 1995 (A), 1996 (A), 1998 (A), 1999 (A), 2000 (A), 2001 (A), 2011 (A) & 2016 (AA)
Southern Huntingdon	Rockets	Three Springs	Huntingdon	AA	blue & gold	District VI	Inter County Conference - North Division	
Southern Lehigh	Spartans	Center Valley	Lehigh	AAAA	blue & white	District XI	Schuylkill Colonial League - Gold Division	
South Fayette	Lions	Pittsburgh	Allegheny	AAAAA	green & white	District VII	WPIAL 5A Allegheny Six Conference	State Champions **2013 (AA)** & **2014 (AA)** - runner up 2010 (AA)
Southmoreland	Scotties	Scottdale	Fayette	AAA	black & red	District VII	WPIAL 3A Western Hills Conference	
South Park	Eagles	South Park	Allegheny	A	blue, white & black	District VII	WPIAL 1A Big Seven Conference	State Champions **1997 (AA)** & **2005 (AA)**
South Philadelphia/Furness	Rams	Philadelphia	Philadelphia	AAAAAA	red & black	XII	Philadelphia Public -National Conference	
South Side	Rams	Hookstown	Beaver	A	black, white & yellow	District VII	WPIAL 1A Big Seven Conference	State Champions **1999 (A)**
South Western	Mustangs	Hanover	York	AAAAA	black & white	District III	York-Adams Interscholastic Athletic Association (YAIAA) - Division I	
South Williamsport	Mountaineers	South Williamsport	Lycoming	A	blue & white	District IV	Northern Tier - Small Conference	runner up 1993 (A) & 1997 (AA)
Springdale	Dynamos	Pittsburgh	Allegheny	A	orange & black	District VII	WPIAL 1A Eastern Conference	
Springfield (Delco)	Cougars	Springfield Township	Delaware	AAAAA	blue & gold	District I	Central Athletic League	
Springfield Township	Spartans	Erdenheim	Montgomery	AAAA	blue & silver	District I	Suburban One League - American Conference	
Spring-Ford	Rams	Royersford	Montgomery	AAAAAA	gold & blue	District I	Pioneer Athletic Conference - Liberty Division	
Spring-Grove	Rockets	Spring Grove	York	AAAAA	blue, red & white	District III	York-Adams Interscholastic Athletic Association (YAIAA) - Division I	
State College	Little Lions	State College	Centre	AAAAAA	maroon & gray	District VI	Mid-Penn Commonwealth Conference	runner up 2009 (AAAA)
Steelton-Highspire	Steamrollers	Steelton	Dauphin	A	r. blue, gray & white	District III	Mid-Penn Capital Conference	State Champions **2007 (A)**, **2008 (A)**, **2020 (A)** & **2022 (A)**
Steel Valley	Ironmen	Munhall	Allegheny	AA	maroon & gold	District VII	WPIAL 2A Allegheny Conference	State Champions **2016 (AA)**
Sto-Rox	Vikings	McKees Rocks	Allegheny	AA	k. green, white & black	District VII	WPIAL 2A Century Conference	
Strath Haven	Panthers	Wallingford	Delaware	AAAAA	black & grey	District I	Central Athletic League	State Champions **1999 (AAA)** & **2000 (AAA)** - runner up 2001 (AAA) & 2002 (AAA)
Stroudsburg	Mountaineers	Stroudsburg	Monroe	AAAAAA	maroon & white	District XI	Eastern Pennsylvania Conference - North	
Summit Academy	Knights	Herman	Butler	A	blue, red & gray	District VII	WPIAL 1A Big Seven Conference	
Sun Valley	Vanguards	Aston	Delaware	AAAAA	navy, gold & white	District I	Ches-Mont League - American Conference	
Susquehanna	Sabres	Susquehanna	Susquehanna	AA	blue & white	District II	Lackawanna Interscholastic Athletic Association (LIAA) - Division 3	
Susquehanna Township	Indians	Harrisburg	Dauphin	AAAA	red & white	District III	Mid-Penn Colonial Conference	
Susquehannock	Warriors	Glen Rock	York	AAAA	red & white	District III	York-Adams Interscholastic Athletic Association (YAIAA) - Division II	
Susquenita	Blackhawks	Duncannon	Perry	AAA	orange & black	District III	Mid-Penn Liberty Conference	

=== T ===
School	Team	City/Town	County	Class	Colors	District	Conference/League	State Championships
Tamaqua	Blue Raiders	Tamaqua	Schuylkill	AAA	blue & white	District XI	Schuylkill Colonial League - Red Division	
Taylor Allderdice	Dragons	Pittsburgh	Allegheny	AAAAAA	green & white	District VIII	Pittsburgh City League Conference	
Thomas A. Edison	Owls	Philadelphia	Philadelphia	AAAAA	green & gold	District XII	Philadelphia Public - American Conference	
Thomas Jefferson	Jaguars	Pittsburgh	Allegheny	AAAA	blue & gold	District VII	WPIAL 4A Big Seven Conference	State Champions **2004 (AAA)**, **2007 (AAA)**, **2008 (AAA)**, **2019 (AAAA)** & **2020 (AAAA)**
Titusville	Rockets	Titusville	Crawford	AAA	brown, gold & white	District X	District 10 Region 4 Division	
Towanda	Black Knights	Towanda	Bradford	AA	black & orange	District IV	Northern Tier League - Large School Division	
Trinity (Camp Hill)	Shamrocks	Camp Hill	Cumberland	AA	green & white	District III	Mid-Penn Capital Conference	
Trinity (Washington)	Hillers	Washington	Washington	AAAA	blue & white	District VII	WPIAL 4A Big Seven Conference	
Tri-Valley	Bulldogs	Hegins	Schuylkill	A	black & red	District XI	Schuylkill Colonial League - Blue Division	
Troy	Trojans	Troy	Bradford	AA	red & white	District IV	Northern Tier League - Large School Division	State Champions **2024 (AA)**
Tunkhannock	Tigers	Tunkhannock	Wyoming	AAAA	orange & black	District II	Wyoming Valley Conference - Division 2	
Tussey Mountain	Titans	Saxton	Bedford	A	black & red	District V	Inter County Conference - South Division	
Twin Valley	Raiders	Elverson	Berks	AAAA	green & white	District III	Lancaster Lebanon League - Section 3	
Tyrone	Golden Eagles	Tyrone	Blair	AAA	black & orange	District VI	Laurel Highlands Athletic Conference - East 1 Division	State Champions **1999 (AA)** - runner up 1996 (AA) & 2011 (AA)

=== U ===
School	Team	City/Town	County	Class	Colors	District	Conference/League	State Championships
Union-AC Valley	Knights	Rimersburg	Clarion	A	r. blue & gold	District IX	District 9 Region 2 Division	
Union Area	Scotties	New Castle	Lawrence	A	blue & white	District VII	WPIAL 1A Big Seven Conference	runner up 2022 (A)
Union City	Bears	Union City	Erie	AAA	green & white	District X	District 10 Region 2 Division	
Uniontown	Red Raiders	Uniontown	Fayette	AAA	maroon & white	District VII	Independent	
Unionville	Longhorns	Kennett Square	Chester	AAAAA	navy & gold	District I	Ches-Mont League - American Conference	
United	Lions	Armagh	Indiana	AA	blue & white	District VI	Heritage Conference	
University Prep	Wildcats	Pittsburgh	Allegheny	AAAA	gold, purple & black	District VIII	Pittsburgh City League Conference	
Upper Darby	Royals	Drexel Hill	Delaware	AAAAAA	purple & gold	District I	Central Athletic League	
Upper Dauphin	Trojans	Elizabethville	Dauphin	AAA	orange, white & black	District III	Mid-Penn Liberty Conference	
Upper Dublin	Cardinals	Fort Washington	Montgomery	AAAAA	cardinal & grey	District I	Suburban One League - Continental Conference	
Upper Merion	Vikings	King of Prussia	Montgomery	AAAAA	navy & gold	District I	Pioneer Athletic Conference - Liberty Division	
Upper Moreland	Bears	Willow Grove	Montgomery	AAAAA	purple & gold	District I	Suburban One League - American Conference	
Upper Perkiomen	Indians	Pennsburg	Montgomery	AAAA	blue & gold	District I	Pioneer Athletic Conference - Frontier Division	
Upper St. Clair	Panthers	Pittsburgh	Allegheny	AAAAA	black, red & white	District VII	WPIAL 5A Allegheny Six Conference	State Champions **1989 (AAAA)** & **2006 (AAAA)** - runner up 1992 (AAAA) & 1997 (AAAA)

=== V ===
School	Team	City/Town	County	Class	Colors	District	Conference/League	State Championships
**Valley**	Vikings	New Kensington	Westmoreland	AAA	black & gold	District VII	**WPIAL 3A Allegheny Six Conference**	
**Valley View**	Cougars	Archbald	Lackawanna	AAAA	blue, gold & white	District II	**Lackawanna Interscholastic Athletic Association (LIAA) - Division 1**	State Champions **1992 (AA)**
**Vaux Big Picture**	Cougars	Philadelphia	Philadelphia	AAA	navy, silver & bright green	District XII	**Philadelphia Public - American Conference**	

=== W ===
School	Team	City/Town	County	Class	Colors	District	Conference/League	State Championships
Wallenpaupack	Buckhorns	Hawley	Wayne	AAAA	purple., black & white	District II	Lackawanna Interscholastic Athletic Association (LIAA) - Division 1	
Warren	Dragons	Warren	Warren	AAA	black & white	District X	District 10 Region 4 Division	
Warrior Run	Defenders	Turbotville	Northumberland	AAA	blue & gray	District IV	Pennsylvania Heartland Athletic Conference (PHAC) - Division 3	
Warwick	Warriors	Lititz	Lancaster	AAAAA	black & red	District III	Lancaster Lebanon League - Section 2	
Washington	Prexies	Washington	Washington	AA	black & c. blue	District VII	WPIAL 2A Century Conference	State Champions **2001 (AA)** - runner up 1993 (AA)
Waynesboro	Indians	Waynesboro	Franklin	AAAAA	blue & gold	District III	Mid-Penn Colonial Conference	
Waynesburg Central	Raiders	Waynesburg	Greene	AA	red & black	District VII	WPIAL 2A Century Conference	
Wellsboro	Hornets	Wellsboro	Tioga	AA	green & white	District IV	Northern Tier League - Large School Division	
West Allegheny	Indians	Imperial	Allegheny	AAAA	scarlet & gray	District VII	WPIAL 4A Parkway Conference	State Champions **2001 (AAA)** - runner up 1999 (AAA) & 2000 (AAA)
West Branch	Warriors	Morrisdale	Clearfield	A	red, white & r. blue	District VI	Inter County Conference - North Division	
West Catholic	Burrs	Philadelphia	Philadelphia	AA	blue & white	District XII	Philadelphia Catholic League - Blue Division	State Champions **2010 (AA)** - runner up 2008 (AA)
West Chester East	Vikings	West Chester	Chester	AAAAA	scarlet & gold	District I	Ches-Mont League - American Conference	
West Chester Henderson	Warriors	West Chester	Chester	AAAAA	garnet & white	District I	Ches-Mont League - American Conference	
Western Beaver	Golden Beavers	Industry	Beaver	AA	purple & gold	District VII	WPIAL 2A Midwestern Conference	runner up 1994 (A)
Western Wayne	Wildcats	Lake Ariel	Wayne	AAA	black & gold	District II	Lackawanna Interscholastic Athletic Association (LIAA) - Division 2	
West Greene	Pioneers	Waynesburg	Greene	A	blue & gold	District VII	WPIAL 1A Tri-County South Conference	
Westinghouse	Bulldogs	Pittsburgh	Allegheny	AA	blue & gold	District VIII	Pittsburgh City League Conference	runner up 2022 (AA)
West Mifflin	Titans	West Mifflin	Allegheny	AAA	blue & gold	District VII	WPIAL 3A Western Hills Conference	
Westmont Hilltop	Hilltoppers	Johnstown	Cambria	AA	scarlet & gray	District VI	Laurel Highlands Athletic Conference - West 1 Division	
West Perry	Mustangs	Elliottsburg	Perry	AAA	kelly green & white	District III	Mid-Penn Colonial Conference	
West Philadelphia	Speedboys	Philadelphia	Philadelphia	AAAAA	orange & blue	District XII	Philadelphia Public - Liberty Conference	
West Scranton	Invaders	Scranton	Lackawanna	AAAAA	blue & white	District II	Lackawanna Interscholastic Athletic Association (LIAA) - Division 2	
West Shamokin	Wolves	Rural Valley	Armstrong	AA	black & silver	District VI	Heritage Conference	
West York	Bulldogs	York	York	AAAA	blue & white	District III	York-Adams Interscholastic Athletic Association (YAIAA) - Division II	
Whitehall	Zephyrs	Whitehall Township	Lehigh	AAAAA	maroon & gold	District XI	Eastern Pennsylvania Conference - South	
Wilkes-Barre	Wolfpack	Plains	Luzerne	AAAAAA	black & carolina blue	District II	Wyoming Valley Conference - Division 1	
William Allen	Canaries	Allentown	Lehigh	AAAAAA	blue & yellow	District XI	Eastern Pennsylvania Conference - North	
William Penn	Bearcats	York	York	AAAAAA	blue & orange	District III	York-Adams Interscholastic Athletic Association (YAIAA) - Division I	
Williamsport	Millionaires	Williamsport	Lycoming	AAAAAA	cherry & white	District IV	Wyoming Valley Conference - Division 1	
Williams Valley	Vikings	Tower City	Schuylkill	AA	blue, red & white	District XI	Schuylkill Colonial League - Blue Division	
William Tennent	Panthers	Warminster Township	Bucks	AAAAAA	red, black & white	District I	Suburban One League - American Conference	
Windber	Ramblers	Windber	Somerset	A	blue & white	District V	Inter County Conference - South Division	
Wilmington	Greyhounds	New Wilmington	Lawrence	AA	blue, gold & white	District X	District 10 Region 3 Division	State Champions **2008 (AA)** - runner up 1988 (AA), 2017 (AA), 2018 (AA) & 2020 (AA)
Wilson	Bulldogs	West Lawn	Berks	AAAAAA	red & white	District III	Lancaster Lebanon League - Section 1	runner up 1989 (AAAA)
Wilson Area	Warriors	Easton	Northampton	AAA	blue & gold	District XI	Schuylkill Colonial League - Gold Division	State Champions **2006 (AA)** - runner up 2005 (AA)
Wissahickon	Trojans	Ambler	Montgomery	AAAAAA	navy & gold	District I	Suburban One League - American Conference	
Woodland Hills	Wolverines	Pittsburgh	Allegheny	AAAAA	black, turq. & white	District VII	WPIAL 5A Northeast Conference	runner up 1996 (AAAA), 2001 (AAAA) & 2002 (AAAA)
Wyalusing Valley	Rams	Wyalusing	Bradford	AA	kelly green & gold	District IV	Northern Tier League - Large School Division	
Wyoming	Warriors	Exeter	Luzerne	AAAA	green & gold	District II	Wyoming Valley Conference - Division 2	State Champions **2019 (AAA)**
Wyoming Valley West	Spartans	Plymouth	Luzerne	AAAAA	burgundy & gold	District II	Wyoming Valley Conference - Division 1	
Wyomissing	Spartans	Wyomissing	Berks	AAA	blue & white	District III	Lancaster Lebanon League - Section 4	State Champions **2012 (AA)** - runner up 2020 (AAA) & 2021 (AAA)

=== Y ===
School	Team	City/Town	County	Class	Colors	District	Conference/League	State Championships
**York Catholic**	Fighting Irish	York	York	AA	green & gold	District III	**York-Adams Interscholastic Athletic Association (YAIAA) - Division III**	
**York County Tech**	Spartans	York	York	AAAAAA	green, white, & silver	District III	**York-Adams Interscholastic Athletic Association (YAIAA) - Division III**	
**York Suburban**	Trojans	York	York	AAAA	black & orange	District III	**York-Adams Interscholastic Athletic Association (YAIAA) - Division II**	
**Yough**	Cougars	Herminie	Westmoreland	AA	green, silver & orange	District VII	**WPIAL 2A Allegheny Conference**	

== PIAA Champions 1988 to present ==
Class AAAAAA

- 2024: Saint Joseph's Prep (District 12) over Central Catholic (District 7) 35 - 6
- 2023: Saint Joseph's Prep (District 12) over North Allegheny (District 7) 45 - 23
- 2022: Saint Joseph's Prep (District 12) over Harrisburg (District 3) 42 - 7
- 2021: Mount Lebanon (District 7) over Saint Joseph's Prep (District 12) 35–17
- 2020: Saint Joseph's Prep (District 12) over Central York (District 3) 62–13
- 2019: Saint Joseph's Prep (District 12) over Central Dauphin (District 3) 35–13
- 2018: Saint Joseph's Prep (District 12) over Harrisburg (District 3) 40–20
- 2017: Pine-Richland (District 7) over Saint Joseph's Prep (District 12) 41–21
- 2016: Saint Joseph's Prep (District 12) over Pittsburgh Central Catholic (District 7) 49–7

Class AAAAA

- 2022: Pine Richland (District 7) over Imhotep Charter (District 12) 28–14
- 2021: Penn Trafford (District 7) over Imhotep Charter (District 12) 17–14
- 2020: Pine-Richland (District 7) over Cathedral Prep (District 10) 48–7
- 2019: Archbishop Wood (District 12) over Cheltenham (District 1) 19–15
- 2018: Penn Hills (District 7) over Manheim Central (District 3) 36–31
- 2017: Archbishop Wood (District 12) over Gateway (District 7) 49–14
- 2016: Archbishop Wood (District 12) over Harrisburg (District 3) 37–10

Class AAAA

- 2022: Bishop McDevitt (District 3) over Aliquippa (District 7) 41–18
- 2021: Aliquippa (District 7) over Bishop McDevitt (District 3) 34–27
- 2020: Thomas Jefferson (District 7) over Jersey Shore Area (District 4) 21–14
- 2019: Thomas Jefferson (District 7) over Dallas (District 2) 46–7
- 2018: Cathedral Prep (District 10) over Imhotep Charter (District 12) 38–7
- 2017: Cathedral Prep (District 10) over Imhotep Charter (District 12) 38–28
- 2016: Cathedral Prep (District 10) over Imhotep Charter (District 12) 27–20
- 2015: Pittsburgh Central Catholic (District 7) over Parkland (District 11) 21–18
- 2014: Saint Joseph's Prep (District 12) over Pine-Richland (District 7) 49–41
- 2013: Saint Joseph's Prep (District 12) over Pittsburgh Central Catholic (District 7) 35–10
- 2012: North Allegheny (District 7) over Coatesville (District 1) 63–28
- 2011: Central Dauphin (District 3) over North Penn (District 1) 14–7
- 2010: North Allegheny (District 7) over La Salle College (District 12) 21–0
- 2009: La Salle College (District 12) over State College (District 6) 24–7
- 2008: Liberty (District 11) over Bethel Park (District 7) 28-21 (OT)
- 2007: Pittsburgh Central Catholic (District 7) over Parkland (District 11) 35–21
- 2006: Upper St. Clair (District 7) over Liberty (District 11) 47–13
- 2005: McKeesport (District 7) over Liberty (District 11) 49–10
- 2004: Pittsburgh Central Catholic (District 7) over Neshaminy (District 1) 49–14
- 2003: North Penn (District 1) over Pittsburgh Central Catholic (District 7) 37–10
- 2002: Parkland (District 11) over Woodland Hills (District 7) 34–12
- 2001: Neshaminy (District 1) over Woodland Hills (District 7) 21–7
- 2000: Cathedral Prep (District 10) over Central Bucks West (District 1) 41-35 (OT)
- 1999: Central Bucks West (District 1) over Cathedral Prep (District 10) 14–13
- 1998: Central Bucks West (District 1) over New Castle (District 7) 56–7
- 1997: Central Bucks West (District 1) over Upper St. Clair (District 7) 44–20
- 1996: Downingtown (District 1) over Woodland Hills (District 7) 49–14
- 1995: Penn Hills (District 7) over Lower Dauphin (District 3) 35–14
- 1994: McKeesport (District 7) over Downingtown (District 1) 17–14
- 1993: North Hills (District 7) over Central Bucks West (District 1) 15–14
- 1992: Cumberland Valley (District 3) over Upper St. Clair (District 7) 28–12
- 1991: Central Bucks West (District 1) over Cathedral Prep (District 10) 26–14
- 1990: North Allegheny (District 7) over Ridley (District 1) 21–14
- 1989: Upper St. Clair (District 7) over Wilson (District 3) 12–7
- 1988: Pittsburgh Central Catholic (District 7) over Cedar Cliff (District 3) 14–7

Class AAA

- 2022: Belle Vernon (District 7) over Neumann Goretti (District 12) 9–8
- 2021: Central Valley (District 7) over Wyomissing (District 3) 7–0
- 2020: Central Valley (District 7) over Wyomissing (District 3) 35–21
- 2019: Wyoming (District 2) over Central Valley (District 7) 21–14
- 2018: Aliquippa (District 7) over Middletown (District 3) 35–0
- 2017: Quaker Valley (District 7) over Middletown (District 3) 41–24
- 2016: Beaver Falls (District 7) over Middletown (District 3) 30–13
- 2015: Imhotep Charter (District 12) over Cathedral Prep (District 10) 40–3
- 2014: Archbishop Wood (District 12) over Central Valley (District 7) 33–14
- 2013: Archbishop Wood (District 12) over Bishop McDevitt (District 3) 22–10
- 2012: Cathedral Prep (District 10) over Archbishop Wood (District 12) 24–14
- 2011: Archbishop Wood (District 12) over Bishop McDevitt (District 3) 52–0
- 2010: Allentown Central Catholic (District 11) over Bishop McDevitt (District 3) 28–27
- 2009: Selinsgrove (District 4) over Manheim Central(District 3) 10–7
- 2008: Thomas Jefferson (District 7) over Archbishop Wood (District 12) 34–7
- 2007: Thomas Jefferson (District 7) over Garnet Valley (District 1) 28–3
- 2006: General McLane (District 10) over Pottsville (District 11) 28–23
- 2005: Franklin Regional (District 7) over Pottsville (District 11) 23–13
- 2004: Thomas Jefferson (District 7) over Manheim Central (District 3) 56–20
- 2003: Manheim Central (District 3) over Pine-Richland (District 7) 39-38 (2OT)
- 2002: Hopewell (District 7) over Strath Haven (District 1) 21–10
- 2001: West Allegheny (District 7) over Strath Haven (District 1) 28–13
- 2000: Strath Haven (District 1) over West Allegheny (District 7) 31–28
- 1999: Strath Haven (District 1) over West Allegheny (District 7) 21–7
- 1998: Allentown Central Catholic (District 11) over Moon (District 7) 10–0
- 1997: Berwick (District 2) over Perry Traditional Academy (District 8) 17–14
- 1996: Berwick (District 2) over Blackhawk (District 7) 34–14
- 1995: Berwick (District 2) over Sharon (District 10) 43–6
- 1994: Berwick (District 2) over Sharon (District 10) 27–7
- 1993: Allentown Central Catholic (District 11) over Blackhawk (District 7) 40–0
- 1992: Berwick (District 2) over Blackhawk (District 7) 33–6
- 1991: Strong Vincent (District 10) over Conestoga Valley (District 3) 29–20
- 1990: Bethlehem Catholic (District 11) over Seton-La Salle (District 7) 43–7
- 1989: Perry Traditional Academy (District 8) over Berwick (District 2) 20–8
- 1988: Berwick (District 2) over Aliquippa (District 7) 13–0

Class AA

- 2025: Southern Columbia (District 4) over Farrell (District 10) 43–22
- 2024: Troy (District 4) over Central Clarion (Co-op) (District 9) 25–24
- 2023: Southern Columbia (District 4) over Westinghouse (District 8) 21–20
- 2022: Southern Columbia (District 4) over Westinghouse (District 8) 37–22
- 2021: Southern Columbia (District 4) over Serra Catholic (District 7) 62–25
- 2020: Southern Columbia (District 4) over Wilmington (District 10) 42–14
- 2019: Southern Columbia (District 4) over Avonworth (District 7) 74–7
- 2018:Southern Columbia (District 4) over Wilmington (District 10) 49–14
- 2017: Southern Columbia (District 4) over Wilmington (District 10) 48–0
- 2016: Steel Valley (District 7) over Southern Columbia (District 4) 49–7
- 2015: Southern Columbia (District 4) over Aliquippa (District 7) 49–14
- 2014: South Fayette (District 7) over Dunmore (District 2) 28–16
- 2013: South Fayette (District 7) over Imhotep Charter (District 12) 41–0
- 2012: Wyomissing Area (District 3) over Aliquippa (District 7) 17–14
- 2011: Lancaster Catholic (District 3) over Tyrone (District 6) 17–7
- 2010: West Catholic (District 12) over South Fayette (District 7) 50–14
- 2009: Lancaster Catholic (District 3) over Greensburg Central Catholic (District 7) 21–14
- 2008: Wilmington (District 10) over West Catholic (District 12) 35-34 (2OT)
- 2007: Jeannette (District 7) over Dunmore (District 2) 49–21
- 2006: Wilson Area (District 11) over Jeannette (District 7) 29–28
- 2005: South Park (District 7) over Wilson Area (District 11) 28–17
- 2004: Lansdale Catholic (District 1) Grove City (District 10) 40–17
- 2003: Aliquippa (District 7) over Northern Lehigh (District 11) 32–27
- 2002: Mount Carmel (District 4) over Seton-La Salle (District 7) 18–13
- 2001: Washington (District 7) over Pen Argyl (District 11) 19–12
- 2000: Mount Carmel (District 4) over Aliquippa (District 7) 26–6
- 1999: Tyrone (District 6) over Mount Carmel (District 4) 13–6
- 1998: Mount Carmel (District 4) over Shady Side Academy (District 7) 44–7
- 1997: South Park (District 7) over South Williamsport (District 4) 20–0
- 1996: Mount Carmel (District 4) over Tyrone (District 6) 25–6
- 1995: Bishop McDevitt (District 3) over Burrell (District 7) 29–0
- 1994: Mount Carmel (District 4) over Forest Hills (District 6) 20-14 (OT)
- 1993: Dallas (District 2) over Washington (District 7) 31–7
- 1992: Valley View (District 2) over East Allegheny (District 7) 21–13
- 1991: Aliquippa (District 7) over Hanover Area (District 2) 27–0
- 1990: Hanover Area (District 2) over Bishop Canevin (District 7) 20-19 (OT)
- 1989: Hickory (District 10) over Montoursville (District 4) 30–22
- 1988: Bethlehem Catholic (District 11) over Wilmington (District 10) 26–11

Class A

- 2022: Steelton-Highspire (District 3) over Union (District 7) 22–8
- 2021: Bishop Guilfoyle (District 6) over Redbank Valley (District 9) 21–14
- 2020: Steelton-Highspire (District 3) over Jeanette (District 7) 32–20
- 2019: Farrell (District 10) over Bishop Guilfoyle (District 6) 10–7
- 2018: Farrell (District 10) over Lackawanna Trail (District 2) 55–20
- 2017: Jeannette (District 7) over Homer-Center (District 6) 42–12
- 2016: Bishop Guilfoyle (District 6) over Clairton (District 7) 17–0
- 2015: Bishop Guilfoyle (District 6) over Farrell (District 10) 35–0
- 2014: Bishop Guilfoyle (District 6) over Clairton (District 7) 19–18
- 2013: North Catholic (District 7) over Old Forge (District 2) 15-14 (OT)
- 2012: Clairton (District 7) over Dunmore (District 2) 20–0
- 2011: Clairton (District 7) over Southern Columbia (District 4) 35–19
- 2010: Clairton (District 7) over Riverside (District 2) 36–30
- 2009: Clairton (District 7) over Bishop McCort (District 6) 15–3
- 2008: Steelton-Highspire (District 3) over Clairton (District 7) 35–16
- 2007: Steelton-Highspire (District 3) over Serra Catholic (District 7) 34–15
- 2006: Southern Columbia (District 4) over West Middlesex (District 10) 56–14
- 2005: Southern Columbia (District 4) over Duquesne (District 7) 50–19
- 2004: Southern Columbia (District 4) over Rochester (District 7) 35–0
- 2003: Southern Columbia (District 4) over Bishop Carroll (District 6) 49–20
- 2002: Southern Columbia (District 4) over Rochester (District 7) 31–6
- 2001: Rochester (District 7) over Southern Columbia (District 4) 16–0
- 2000: Rochester (District 7) over Southern Columbia (District 4) 22–14
- 1999: South Side (District 7) over Southern Columbia (District 4) 27–21
- 1998: Rochester (District 7) over Southern Columbia (District 4) 18–0
- 1997: Sharpsville (District 10) over Riverside (District 2) 10–7
- 1996: Farrell (District 10) over Southern Columbia (District 4) 14–12
- 1995: Farrell (District 10) over Southern Columbia (District 4) 6–0
- 1994: Southern Columbia (District 4) over Western Beaver (District 7) 49–6
- 1993: Duquesne (District 7) over South Williamsport (District 4) 24–21
- 1992: Scotland School (District 3) over Smethport (District 9) 24–7
- 1992: Shenandoah Valley Junior Senior High School (District 11) over Schuylkill Haven 10–0
- 1991: Schuylkill Haven (District 11) over Rochester (District 7) 28–18
- 1990: Marian Catholic (District 11) over Farrell (District 10) 21–13
- 1989: Dunmore (District 2) over Keystone (District 9) 57–18
- 1988: Camp Hill (Division 3) over Cambridge Springs (District 10) 18–7

== Champions 1885 to 1987 ==
The following list of championships happened prior to the creation of the current PIAA playoff format which was created in 1988. Prior to the current playoff format, high school football championships was based on the Saylor System. This system was a points system and no playoffs occurred from 1885 until 1987.

- 1887 Germantown Academy
- 1888 Haverford School
- 1889 William Penn Charter
- 1890 Haverford School, William Penn Charter
- 1891 Haverford School
- 1892 Hill School
- 1893 Germantown Academy
- 1894 Hill School
- 1895 Hill School
- 1896 Cheltenham Military Academy
- 1897 Hill School
- 1898 Germantown Academy
- 1899 Hill School
- 1900 Hill School
- 1901 Hill School
- 1902 Haverford School
- 1903 Easton
- 1904 Hill School
- 1905 Williamsport
- 1906 Steelton-Highspire
- 1907 Shamokin
- 1908 Williamsport
- 1909 Central (Pittsburgh)
- 1910 Williamsport
- 1911 Greensburg Salem
- 1912 Central (Pittsburgh)
- 1913 Reading
- 1914 Wilkinsburg
- 1915 Central (Harrisburg)
- 1916 Wilkinsburg
- 1917 Easton
- 1918 Harrisburg Tech
- 1919 Harrisburg Tech
- 1920 Greensburg Salem
- 1921 Rochester
- 1922 Wilkinsburg
- 1923 Harrisburg Tech
- 1924 New Castle
- 1925 Easton
- 1926 Schenley
- 1927 Greensburg Salem
- 1928 William Penn (Harrisburg)
- 1929 Clairton, Greensburg Salem
- 1930 John Harris (Harrisburg)
- 1931 Shenandoah Valley
- 1932 Jeanette
- 1933 New Castle
- 1934 Liberty
- 1935 North Braddock Scott
- 1936 McKeesport
- 1937 North Braddock Scott
- 1938 Hazleton
- 1939 Easton
- 1940 Brownsville
- 1941 Johnstown
- 1942 Clairton, New Castle, Wilkinsburg
- 1943 Brownsville
- 1944 Donora
- 1945 Donora
- 1946 Altoona, Brownsville
- 1947 New Kensington
- 1948 Steelton-Highspire
- 1949 New Castle
- 1950 Williamsport
- 1951 Farrell
- 1952 Aliquippa
- 1953 Har-Brack
- 1954 Brownsville, Williamsport
- 1955 Aliquippa
- 1956 Jeanette, Williamsport
- 1957 Wilkinsburg
- 1958 Mt. Lebanon
- 1959 Charleroi
- 1960 Beaver Falls
- 1961 Monessen
- 1962 John Harris (Harrisburg)
- 1963 Washington
- 1964 Central Catholic (Pittsburgh)
- 1965 Uniontown
- 1966 John Harris (Harrisburg)
- 1967 New Castle
- 1968 Latrobe
- 1969 John Harris (Harrisburg)
- 1970 Mt. Lebanon
- 1971 Kiski
- 1972 Gateway
- 1973 State College
- 1974 Gateway, Pennsbury, Upper St. Clair
- 1975 New Castle, Upper St. Clair
- 1976 Penn Hills
- 1977 Penn Hills
- 1978 Steelton-Highspire
- 1979 Penn Hills
- 1980 Central Bucks West
- 1981 Mt. Lebanon
- 1982 Cumberland Valley, Steelton-Highspire, Steel Valley
- 1983 Berwick
- 1984 Owen J. Roberts
- 1985 North Hills
- 1986 Gateway
- 1987 Central Bucks West, North Hills

== Non-PIAA Schools ==
The following schools are not recognized by the PIAA as of the 2018–19 school year.

School	Team	City/Town	County	Class	Colors	District	Conference/League	State Championships
Academy of the New Church	Lions	Bryn Athyn	Montgomery	AAA	scarlet & white		Independence Conference	
Episcopal Academy	Churchmen	Newtown Square	Delaware	AAA	blue & white		Inter-Academic League	
George School	Cougars	Newtown	Bucks	AAAA	green & white		Independence Conference	
Germantown Academy	Patriots	Fort Washington	Montgomery	AA	black & red		Inter-Academic League	
Haverford School	Fords	Haverford Township	Delaware	AAAA	maroon & gold		Inter-Academic League	
Hill School	Rams	Pottstown	Montgomery		blue & gray		Mid-Atlantic Prep League (competes with schools in New Jersey)	
Malvern Prep	Friars	Malvern	Chester	AAAAA	blue & silver		Inter-Academic League	
Mercersburg Academy	Blue Storm	Mercersburg	Franklin		blue & white		Mid-Atlantic Prep League (competes with schools in New Jersey)	
Perkiomen School	Panthers	Pennsburg	Montgomery	AAA	purple & gold		Independence Conference	
Springside Chestnut Hill Academy	Blue Devils	Philadelphia	Philadelphia	AAA	blue, l. blue & white		Inter-Academic League	
Valley Forge Military Academy	Trojans	Wayne	Delaware	A	scarlet & white		Keystone State 8-man Football League	
William Penn Charter	Quakers	Philadelphia	Philadelphia	AA	blue & gold		Inter-Academic League	
Wyoming Seminary College Prep	Blue Knights	Kingston	Luzerne	A	blue & white		Freelance Conference	

== Cooperative Football Teams ==
The following schools have co-oped with another school in high school football competition.

School	City/Town	County	Co-op school
Allegheny-Clarion Valley	Foxburg	Clarion	Union
Bishop Carroll	Ebensburg	Cambria	Bishop McCort
Blacklick Valley	Nanty-Glo	Cambria	United
Carson Long Military Academy	New Bloomfield	Perry	Susquenita
Clarion	Clarion	Clarion	Clarion-Limestone
Clarion-Limestone	Strattanville	Clarion	Clarion
East Juniata	McAlisterville	Juniata	Tri-Valley
Ferndale	Ferndale	Cambria	Conemaugh Valley
Geibel Catholic	Connellsville	Fayette	Southmoreland
Johnsonburg	Johnsonburg	Elk	Ridgway
Millersburg	Millersburg	Dauphin	Upper Dauphin
Nazareth Prep	Emsworth	Allegheny	Cornell
Oswayo Valley	Shinglehouse	Potter	Otto-Eldred
West Middlesex	West Middlesex	Mercer	Sharpsville
Wilkinsburg	Pittsburgh	Allegheny	Westinghouse
Williamsburg	Williamsburg	Blair	Juniata Valley
Youngsville	Youngsville	Warren	Warren

== Program drops ==
The following schools have decided to stop or temporarily cancel the high school football program as of the 2018–19 season.

School	Team	City/Town	County	Past Class	Colors	Past District	Past Conference/League	State Championships
Calvary Christian Academy	Cougars	Philadelphia	Philadelphia	A	blue & white	District I	Bicentennial League	
Delaware County Christian	Knights	Newtown Square	Delaware	A	d. green, white & black	District I	Bicentennial League	
Our Lady of Lourdes Regional High School	Red Raiders	Shamokin	Northumberland	A	red & white	District IV	All American Football Conference	
Prep Charter	Huskies	Philadelphia	Philadelphia	AAA	blue & gold	District XII	Philadelphia Public - National Conference	
Rockwood	Rockets	Rockwood	Somerset	A	red, white & gray	District V	Western Pennsylvania Athletic Conference (WPAC)	
Saint Joseph's Catholic Academy	Wolves	Boalsburg	Centre	A	blue & orange	District VI	Independence Conference	
Shade	Panthers	Cairnbrook	Somerset	A	navy & gold	District V	Western Pennsylvania Athletic Conference (WPAC)	
Vincentian Academy	Royals	Pittsburgh	Allegheny	A	blue & gold	District VII	Freelance League	

== Past Schools/Teams ==
School	Team	City/Town	County	Class	Colors	Closed/Merged	State Championships
Bishop Hoban	Argent	Wilkes-Barre	Luzerne	AA	green & gold	2007 closed	
Bishop McDevitt (Wyncote)	Royal Lancers	Wyncote	Montgomery	AA	black & gold	2021 closed	
Blairsville	Bobcats	Blairsville	Indiana	A	orange & black	merged with Saltsburg and became River Valley	
Cardinal Brennan High School	Chargers	Ashland	Schuylkill	A	navy blue & vegas gold	2007 Closed	
Cavalry Christian Academy	Cougars	Philadelphia	Philadelphia	A	blue & white	2017 closed	
Central Tech	Falcons	Erie	Erie	AAAAA	black & gold	2018 merged w/Erie	
Duquesne	Dukes	Duquesne	Allegheny	A	red & blue	2007 closed	State Champions 1993 (A) - runner up 2005 (A)
East (Erie)	Warriors	Erie	Erie	AAAAA	scarlet, silver & white	2018 merged w/Erie	
Elmer L. Meyers	Mohawks	Wilkes-Barre	Luzerne	AAA	blue & gold	closed 2021	
Ford City	Sabers	Ford City	Armstrong	AA	purple & gold	2016 merged w/Armstrong	
GAR Memorial	Grenadiers	Wilkes-Barre	Luzerne	AAA	navy & silver	closed 2021, consolidated to become Wilkes-Barre	
Glen Mills	Battling Bulls	Concordville	Delaware	AAAA	black & gold	closed in 2019	
James M. Coughlin	Crusaders	Wilkes-Barre	Luzerne	AAAA	blue & red	closed 2021, consolidated to become Wilkes-Barre	
Millersburg	Indians	Millersburg	Dauphin	A	maroon & gold	suspended football 2019	
Saltsburg	Trojans	Saltsburg	Indiana	A	red & white	merged with Blairsville and became River Valley	
Scotland School	Cadets	Scotland	Franklin	A	red & blue	2009 closed	State Champions 1992 (A)
Strawberry Mansion	Knights	Philadelphia	Philadelphia	A	red & white	2021 closed	
Strong Vincent	Colonels	Erie	Erie	AAAAA	black & red	2018 merged w/Erie	State Champions 1991 (AAA)

== PIAA Conferences ==
- Bicentennial Athletic League
- Central Athletic League
- Ches-Mont League - American Conference
- Ches-Mont League - National Conference
- Delaware Valley League
- District 9 - Region 1 Division
- District 9 - Region 2 Division
- District 9 - Region 3 Division
- District 10 - Region 1 Division
- District 10 - Region 2 Division
- District 10 - Region 3 Division
- District 10 - Region 4 Division
- District 10 - Region 5 Division
- District 10 - Region 6 Division
- Eastern Pennsylvania Conference - North
- Eastern Pennsylvania Conference - South
- Heritage Conference
- Inter-County Conference - North Division
- Inter-County Conference - South Division
- Lackawanna Interscholastic Athletic Association (LIAA) - Division 1
- Lackawanna Interscholastic Athletic Association (LIAA) - Division 2
- Lackawanna Interscholastic Athletic Association (LIAA) - Division 3
- Lancaster-Lebanon League - Section 1
- Lancaster-Lebanon League - Section 2
- Lancaster-Lebanon League - Section 3
- Lancaster-Lebanon League - Section 4
- Lancaster-Lebanon League - Section 5
- Laurel Highlands Athletic Conference - East 1 Division
- Laurel Highlands Athletic Conference - East 2 Division
- Laurel Highlands Athletic Conference - West 1 Division
- Laurel Highlands Athletic Conference - West 2 Division
- Mid-Penn Conference - Capital Division
- Mid-Penn Conference - Commonwealth Division
- Mid-Penn Conference - Keystone Division
- Northern Tier Large Conference
- Northern Tier Small Conference
- Pennsylvania Heartland Athletic Conference (PHAC) - Division 1
- Pennsylvania Heartland Athletic Conference (PHAC) - Division 2
- Philadelphia Catholic League - Blue Division
- Philadelphia Catholic League - Red Division
- Philadelphia Public League - American Conference
- Philadelphia Public League - Independence Conference
- Philadelphia Public League - Liberty Conference
- Philadelphia Public League - National Conference
- Pioneer Athletic Conference - Liberty Division
- Pittsburgh City League
- Schuylkill Colonial League - Gold Division
- Schuylkill Colonial League - White Division
- Suburban One League - American Conference
- Suburban One League - Continental Conference
- Suburban One League - National Conference
- WPIAL 1A Black Hills Conference
- WPIAL 1A Eastern Conference
- WPIAL 1A Tri-County South Conference
- WPIAL 2A Allegheny Conference
- WPIAL 2A Century Conference
- WPIAL 2A Midwestern Conference
- WPIAL 3A Allegheny Six Conference
- WPIAL 3A Interstate Conference
- WPIAL 3A Western Hills Conference
- WPIAL 4A Big Seven Conference
- WPIAL 4A Greater Allegheny Conference
- WPIAL 4A Parkway Conference
- WPIAL 5A Allegheny Six Conference
- WPIAL 5A Big East Conference
- WPIAL 5A Northeast Conference
- WPIAL 6A Tri-County Five Conference
- Wyoming Valley Conference - Division 1
- Wyoming Valley Conference - Division 2
- York-Adams 3 Conference
- York-Adams Interscholastic Athletic Association (YAIAA) - Division I
- York-Adams Interscholastic Athletic Association (YAIAA) - Division II
- York-Adams Interscholastic Athletic Association (YAIAA) - Division III

== Past seasons ==
- 2016 PIAA football season

== See also ==
- High school football
