= Trinity High School (Lower Allen Township, Pennsylvania) =

Location
- 3601 Simpson Ferry Road; Camp Hill address, (Cumberland County), Pennsylvania 17011; United States; 40°13′29″N 76°56′29″W

Information
- Type: Private, Coeducational
- Motto: Ad Summum Bonum ("To the Highest Good")
- Religious affiliation: Roman Catholic
- Established: 1963
- Status: Active
- President: John Cominsky '85
- Principal: Eileen Poplaski
- Faculty: 55
- Grades: 9-12
- Average class size: 20 students
- Student to teacher ratio: 13:1
- Colors: Green and White
- Athletics conference: Mid-Penn; PIAA – District 3
- Sports: Lacrosse, Football, Basketball, Baseball, Softball, Track, Volleyball, Swimming and Diving, Tennis, Soccer, Cross Country, Golf, Wrestling
- Mascot: Shamrock
- Team name: Trinity Shamrocks
- Rival: Camp Hill, Mechanicsburg, Cumberland Valley, Cedar Cliff, East Pennsboro, Bishop McDevitt High School
- Accreditation: Middle States Association of Colleges and Schools
- Yearbook: Triquetra
- Tuition: $9,900 for one Catholic student
- Alumni: Shane Gillis, Greg Brown
- Website: thsrocks.us

Trinity High School is a private, coeducational Catholic high school in the Diocese of Harrisburg, located in Lower Allen Township, Pennsylvania, with a Camp Hill postal address, west of Harrisburg.

The school has 55 faculty members and an enrollment of about 525 students in grades 9 through 12. The school was twice listed (1992, 1999) as a Blue Ribbon School by the U.S. Department of Education. The school's mascot is the Shamrock.

== Athletics ==
Trinity is a part of the PIAA District III and the Mid Penn Conference. It has been known for its athletics for many years. The football team has been associated with PIAA District III Class 2A, but reclassed into District III Class 3A ahead of the 2025 season. The boys and girls basketball teams have claimed multiple PIAA State Championships as well as several District Championships. The boys Track and Field teams won two straight PIAA State Championships in 2010 and 2011. The girls soccer team was the runner up in the 2010 and 2013 PIAA State tournaments before winning their first title in 2014 and repeating as state champions in 2015 and 2016. Athletes from Trinity High School also won PIAA state gold in boys cross country (2010) and girls diving (2011).

=== Notable Coaching Staff ===
2021-2024 Football Head Coach Jordan Hill

2023-2024 Football Assistant Head Coach Michael Mauti

2025-2026 Girls Basketball Head Coach Norris Cole

== Controversy ==
In 2011, Trinity was the subject of a police investigation after an open lewdness incident was reported at the football team's training camp. A number of Trinity students who were identified as the perpetrators of the event were subsequently prosecuted. The school also disciplined students, which included expulsion for some.

The Trinity football program came under media and police scrutiny for off-season misconduct in 2016 when two team members were captured on video assaulting a man while attending a Donald Trump rally at neighboring Cumberland Valley High School. These students faced consequences from the school, including cleaning it.

== Sports Championships ==
List of Championships
Team	Mid Penn Championships	PIAA District III Championships	PIAA State Championships
Boys Basketball	1989, 1996, 1997, 1998, 2001, 2002, 2003, 2004, 2006, 2011, 2012, 2017, 2018, 2019* 2020, 2022* 2023*	1991, 1992, 1997, 1998, 2001, 2002, 2003, 2004, 2008, 2009, 2010, 2013, 2014, 2015, 2016, 2017, 2018, 2019, 2020, 2023, 2025, 2026	2001, 2003, 2026
Girls Basketball	1983, 1985, 1986, 1987, 1988, 1989, 1990, 1991, 1992, 1993, 1997, 1998, 2006, 2007, 2011, 2012, 2018, 2019* 2020, 2021, 2022*, 2023*, 2026	1983, 1984, 1985, 1987, 1988, 1989, 1990, 1998, 1999, 2003, 2005, 2009, 2010, 2018, 2019, 2021, 2022, 2025, 2026	1986, 2001
Football	2002, 2004, 2006, 2007, 2009, 2010, 2011, 2012	2002, 2010, 2022, 2025	
Girls Voleyball	1997, 2010, 2011, 2012, 2016, 2017, 2018, 2019, 2020, 2021, 2022, 2023, 2024	2019, 2020, 2021, 2023, 2024	2020, 2024
Boys Soccer	1988, 1991, 1992, 1993, 1994, 1996, 1999, 2000	2005	
Girls Soccer	2000, 2006, 2007, 2008, 2009, 2010, 2011, 2012, 2013, 2014, 2023*	2010, 2011, 2012, 2014, 2015, 2016, 2023, 2025	2014, 2015, 2016
Boys Lacrosse	2018*, 2021*, 2022*, 2023, 2025, 2026	2018, 2021, 2024, 2025	
Boys Tennis	2005, 2006, 2007, 2022*, 2023*, 2024*	2006, 2022, 2025	
Girls Tennis	2002, 2005, 2006, 2007, 2008, 2009, 2011, 2012, 2013, 2014, 2019, 2020*, 2021*, 2022*, 2023*, 2026	2019, 2020, 2021, 2022, 2023	
Boys Golf	1999, 2002, 2008, 2009, 2010, 2011, 2014, 2015, 2016, 2017, 2018*, 2020, 2022, 2023, 2024	2018, 2021	
Girls Golf	2024	2024, 2025, 2026	
Baseball	2005, 2011, 2026		
Softball	2024*, 2025, 2026	2024	
Boys Wrestling	2019*, 2022*	2022	
Boys Cross Country	1990, 1991, 1993, 1998, 2001, 2003, 2004, 2007, 2008, 2012, 2013, 2020, 2021*, 2022	2021	
Girls Cross Country	1983, 1984, 1990, 1993, 1994, 1995, 1997, 1998, 2000, 2001, 2010, 2021* 2022		
Boys Track and Field	1986, 1995, 1996, 2007, 2008, 2009, 2010, 2011, 2012, 2013	2008, 2012, 2013, 2021, 2022	2010, 2011
Girls Track and Field	1994, 2006, 2012, 2013, 2022	2008, 2009, 2013, 2019, 2020, 2022	
Boys Swimming and Diving	1999, 2014, 2015, 2016, 2021		
Girls Swimming and Diving	2004, 2005, 2006, 2007	2021	

*Divional Champions

== Notable alumni ==
- Greg Brown - sportscaster, Pittsburgh Pirates play-by-play announcer.
- William J. Burns - American diplomat; former Director of the CIA.
- Shane Gillis - stand-up comedian, radio personality, and podcaster.
- Matt Kranchick - free agent NFL tight end; attended Penn State.
- James Urban - Class of 1992, wide receivers coach for the Cincinnati Bengals.
- Maika Niu - shortstop, centerfielder, and first baseman for the Hudson Valley Renegades
