= Ridgway Area School District =

School district in Pennsylvania

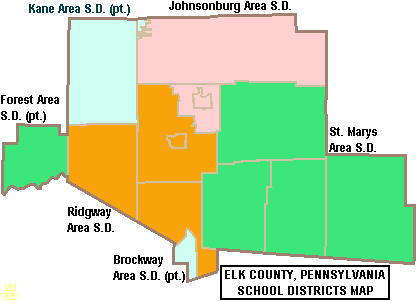

Address
- 62 School Drive Ridgway, Elk County, Pennsylvania, 15853-9803; United States

District information
- Type: Public

Students and staff
- District mascot: Daryl the Elk
- Colors: Maroon & white

Other information
- Website: www.rasd.us

The Ridgway Area School District is a rural public school district serving parts of Elk County, Pennsylvania. It encompasses the communities of Ridgway, Ridgway Township, Spring Creek Township, and Horton Township. Ridgway Area School District encompasses approximately 181 square miles (470 km^{2}). According to 2010 federal census data, it serves a resident population of 6,558.

Students in grades K-5 attend the elementary school, those in grades 6-8 attend the middle school, and those in grades 9-12 attend the high school.

== Extracurriculars ==
Ridgway area School District offers a variety of clubs, activities and an extensive sports program.

=== Sports ===
The District funds:

Boys

- Baseball - A
- Basketball- AA
- Cross country - A
- Football - AA
- Golf - AA
- Soccer - A
- Wrestling - AA

Girls

- Basketball - AA
- Cross country - A
- Golf - AA
- Gymnastics - AAAA
- Soccer (fall) - A
- Softball - A
- Volleyball - A

Middle school sports

Boys

- Basketball
- Cross country
- Football
- Soccer
- Track and field
- Wrestling

Girls

- Basketball
- Cross country
- Soccer (fall)
- Track and field
- Volleyball

According to PIAA directory February 2018

=== Music ===
Musical activities available to high school students include:

- The "Mighty Elker" Marching Band, directed by Theresa Morley-Palmer
- Concert Band (Class)
- Concert Choir (Class)
- Show Choir (Club)
- HS Drama
