= PIAA District 10 =

High school athletic region in northwest Pennsylvania

District 10 of the Pennsylvania Interscholastic Athletic Association (PIAA) is an interscholastic athletic association in Northwest Pennsylvania. District 10 is one of the PIAA's 12 athletic conferences and comprises high schools in Erie, Pennsylvania and surrounding counties to the south and east. Member schools are classified by enrollment into four categories based on the number of students: A, AA, AAA, AAAA. District 10 is commonly referred to as "D-10" and is sometimes notated with the Roman Numeral "X".

== Member schools ==
The league is made up of 50 public schools and private schools located in Crawford, Erie, Mercer, Venango and Warren counties.

Exceptions include:

- Slippery Rock who is a member of Butler County but participates in District 10
- Wilmington Area in Lawrence and Mercer Counties
- Dubois, who is the only AAAA football school in District 9 and competes in District 10's Region 5

Alphabetical list of D-10 Member Schools with addresses and contact information:

- Untitled document

== Sports ==
District 10 hosts thirteen sports over three athletic seasons: fall, winter and spring. Several D-10 teams also compete in bowling, hockey, lacrosse and water polo, but are in leagues that are not a part of the PIAA.

Fall: Football, Soccer, Tennis (girls), Cross Country, Volleyball (girls)

Winter: Swimming & Diving, Wrestling, Basketball

Spring: Tennis (boys), Softball, Baseball, Volleyball (boys), Track & Field

Note: While some sports are dominated by one sex, there is no rule that mandates sex segregation in PIAA sports, even if a school has teams for each sex.

== Athletes of 2000s ==
On January 8, 2009, the Erie Times News conducted online fan voting to determine the District 10 Athletes/Team of the Decade. The winners were: These are unofficial as the Erie Times News does not reach nearly half of District 10.

- Male Athlete of the Decade: Ed Hinkel (football, Cathedral Prep)
- Female Athlete of the Decade: Lauren Zarger (cross country/track and field, Harborcreek)
- Team of the Decade: 2000 Cathedral Prep football

== All-Time Champions ==
Boys' Cross Country (2000–Present)
Year	Class A	Class AA	Class AAA
2024	Lakeview	Grove City	Taylor Allerdice
2023	Rocky Grove	Grove City	McDowell
2022	Lakeview	Grove City	McDowell
2021	Rocky Grove	Grove City	Taylor Allderdice
2020	Rocky Grove	Grove City	
2019	Cochranton	Grove City	Taylor Allderdice
2018	Cochranton	Grove City	
2017	Cochranton	Harbor Creek	McDowell
2016	Seneca	Harbor Creek	Cathedral Prep
2015	Seneca	Grove City	Cathedral Prep
2014	Seneca	Grove City	McDowell
2013	Saegertown	Grove City	McDowell
2012	Saegertown	Grove City	Cathedral Prep
2011		North East	Grove City
2010		Fairview	Grove City
2009		North East	McDowell
2008		North East	Grove City
2007		General McLane	Cathedral Prep
2006		West Middlesex	Cathedral Prep
2005		North East	Meadville
2004		Youngsville	General McLane
2003		Eisenhower	General McLane
2002		Harbor Creek	General McLane
2001		Eisenhower	Harbor Creek
2000		Grove City	Harbor Creek

Girls' Cross Country (2000–Present)
Year	Class A	Class AA	Class AAA
2024	Lakeview	Cathedral Prep	McDowell
2023	Seneca	Cathedral Prep	McDowell
2022	Seneca	Cathedral Prep	Taylor Allderdice
2021	Lakeview	Villa Maria	Taylor Allderdice
2020	Wilmington	Villa Maria	
2019	Wilmington	Harbor Creek	McDowell
2018	Union City	Villa Maria	
2017	Fairview	Villa Maria	
2016	Lakeview	Villa Maria	
2015	North East	Villa Maria	DuBois
2014	West Middlesex	Villa Maria	DuBois
2013	West Middlesex	Villa Maria	McDowell
2012	West Middlesex	Villa Maria	McDowell
2011		Mercyhurst Prep	McDowell
2010		Mercyhurst Prep	Meadville
2009		West Middlesex	Meadville
2008		West Middlesex	McDowell
2007		Union City	Meadville
2006		General McLane	Meadville
2005		Slippery Rock	General McLane
2004		Villa Maria	General McLane
2003		Villa Maria	McDowell
2002		Seneca	Meadville
2001		Eisenhower	McDowell
2000		Titusville	McDowell

Boys' Track & Field (2002–Present)
Year	Class AA	Class AAA
2023	Slippery Rock	McDowell
2022	Grove City	Slippery Rock
2021	Grove City	Cathedral Prep
2019	Grove City	General McLane
2018	Hickory	Grove City
2017	Hickory	McDowell
2016		
2015	Hickory	
2014	Hickory	
2013	Hickory	
2012	West Middlesex	
2011	Hickory	
2010	General McLane	
2009	Titusville	
2008	Wilmington	
2007	Lakeview	
2006	Greenville	
2005	Greenville	
2004	Abraxas	
2003	Sharon	
2002	Mercyhurst Prep	

Girls' Track & Field (2002–Present)
Year	Class AA	Class AAA
2023	Fort LeBouf	Meadville
2022	Fairview	Hickory / Grove City
2021	Slippery Rock	Hickory
2019	Slippery Rock	Grove City
2018	Hickory	Villa Maria
2017	Hickory	Villa Maria
2016		
2015	Villa Maria	
2014	Wilmington	
2013	Villa Maria	
2012	Hickory	
2011	Hickory	
2010	Hickory	
2009	Slippery Rock	
2008	Fort LeBoeuf	
2007	Grove City	
2006	Fort LeBoeuf	
2005	Mercer	
2004	Titusville	
2003	Hickory	
2002	Hickory	

=== Football (1985-Present) ===
2025

Class 6A McDowell wins by forfeit

Class 5A No game

Class 4A Oil City 16 General McLane 14

Class 3A Sharon 20 Hickory 17

Class 2A Farrell 52 Mercyhurst Prep 0

Class 1A Greenville 25 Wilmington 22

2024

Class 6A-McDowell 28, Erie 14

Class 5A-Cathedral Prep-No game

Class 4A-General McLane 34, Meadville 0

Class 3A-Hickory 37, Sharon 31

Class 2A-Farrell 28, Sharpsville 18

Class 1A-Wilmington 26, Greenville 21

2023

Class 6A-McDowell 58, Erie 20

Class 5A-Cathedral Prep-No game

Class 4A-Meadville 45 Corry 13

Class 3A-Hickory 14, Sharon 6

Class 2A-Farrell 16, Mercyhurst Prep 9

Class 1A-Cambridge Springs 32, Lakeview 29

2022

Class 6A - McDowell 62, Butler 7

Class 5A - Cathedral Prep-No game

Class 4A - Meadville 62, Corry 14

Class 3A - Grove City 42, Slippery Rock 23

Class 2A - Farrell 26, Sharpsville 0

Class 1A - Reynolds 28, Eisenhower 14

2021

Class 6A - McDowell 40, Butler 21

Class 5A - Cathedral Prep 48, Hollidaysburg 7

Class 4A - Meadville 52, General McLane 19

Class 3A - Grove City 28, Slippery Rock 20

Class 2A - Farrell 48, Wilmington 6

Class 1A - Reynolds 23, Cochranton 0

2020

Class 6A - McDowell-No game

Class 5A - Cathedral Prep-No game

Class 4A - Oil City 51, Harbor Creek 14

Class 3A - Hickory 42, Grove City 29

Class 2A - Wilmington 19, Farrell 14

Class 1A - Reynolds 27, Eisenhower 0

2019

Class 6A - McDowell 58, Erie 30

Class 5A - Oil City 9, Meadville 7

Class 4A - Cathedral Prep 56, Fort LeBoeuf 0

Class 3A - Sharon 33, Grove City 21

Class 2A - Wilmington 45, Greenville 7

Class 1A - Farrell 35, Maplewood 20 ~

2018

Class 6A - McDowell 40, Erie 33

Class 5A - Oil City 14, General McLane 12

Class 4A - Cathedral Prep 42, Fort LeBoeuf 12 ~

Class 3A - Sharon 23, Grove City 6

Class 2A - Wilmington 50, Sharpsville 7 ^

Class 1A - Farrell 50, West Middlesex 6 ~

2017
Class 6A - Erie 35, McDowell 34
Class 5A - Grove City 35, Meadville 14
Class 4A - Cathedral Prep (no game) ~
Class 3A - Sharon 21, Mercyhurst Prep 14
Class 2A - Wilmington 31, Greenville 13 ^
Class 1A - Farrell 52, Cambridge Springs 27

2016
Class 6A - McDowell (no game)
Class 5A - Meadville 62, Grove City 26
Class 4A - Cathedral Prep (no game) ~
Class 3A - Hickory 45, Sharon 13
Class 2A - Wilmington 56, Sharpsville 7
Class 1A - Farrell 22, West Middlesex 12

2015
Class AAAA - McDowell 35, General McLane 30
Class AAA - Cathedral Prep 42, Conneaut 21
Class AA - Hickory 32, Sharon 19
Class A - Farrell 26, Sharpsville 20 OT

2014
Class AAAA - McDowell 29, General McLane 19
Class AAA - Conneaut 14, Cathedral Prep 7
Class AA - Hickory 12, Greenville 7
Class A - Sharpsville 29, West Middlesex 14

2013
Class AAA - Cathedral Prep 63, General McLane 21
Class AA - Hickory 21, Girard 10
Class A - Lakeview 27, Sharpsville 0

2012
Class AAA - Cathedral Prep 48, General McLane 14
Class AA - Hickory 39, Wilmington 7
Class A - Sharpsville 28, West Middlesex 0

2011
Class AAA - Grove City 33, Cathedral Prep 0
Class AA - Hickory 35, General McLane 13
Class A - Sharpsville 21, West Middlesex 13

2010
Class AAA - Cathedral Prep 28, Grove City 16
Class AA - Sharon 14, Hickory 6
Class A - Farrell 39, Mercyhurst Prep 0

2009
Class AAA - Cathedral Prep 47, Grove City 21
Class AA - Wilmington 19, Sharon 0
Class A - Farrell 34, Sharpsville 7

2008
Class AAA - Strong Vincent 28, Cathedral Prep 0
Class AA - Wilmington 21, Slippery Rock 14 OT
Class A - Farrell 28, Linesville 7

2007
Class AAAA - Cathedral Prep 15, McDowell 13
Class AAA - Strong Vincent 41, General McLane 6
Class AA - Wilmington 18, Harborcreek 6
Class A - Mercyhurst Prep 21, Mercer 19

2006
Class AAAA - Cathedral Prep 35, McDowell 14
Class AAA - General McLane 19, Strong Vincent 7 ~
Class AA - Wilmington 23, Fairview 6
Class A - West Middlesex 35, Sharpsville 13 ^

2005
Class AAAA - Cathedral Prep 20, McDowell 19
Class AAA - General McLane 23, Strong Vincent 20
Class AA - Reynolds 21, Wilmington 0
Class A - Kennedy Catholic 34, Sharpsville 12

2004
Class AAAA - McDowell 32, Cathedral Prep 13
Class AAA - Strong Vincent 28, General McLane 7
Class AA - Grove City 33, Harborcreek 7 ^
Class A - Sharpsville 21, Linesville 14

2003
Class AAAA - Cathedral Prep 33, McDowell 14
Class AAA - Strong Vincent 36, Franklin 15
Class AA - Slippery Rock 34, Girard 13
Class A - West Middlesex 7, Cochranton 6 2OT

2002
Class AAAA - McDowell 14, Cathedral Prep 13
Class AAA - General McLane 42, Warren 6
Class AA - Slippery Rock 17, Sharon 7
Class A - West Middlesex 21, Eisenhower 17

2001
Class AAAA - Cathedral Prep 33, McDowell 21
Class AAA - Wilmington 28, Greenville 7
Class AA - Sharon 33, North East 0
Class A - Sharpsville 39, Iroquois 6

2000
Class AAAA - Cathedral Prep 62, McDowell 21 ~
Class AAA - Wilmington 16, Greenville 7
Class AA - Sharon 35, Girard 0
Class A - Sharpsville 14, Kennedy Christian 7

1999
Class AAAA - Cathedral Prep 54, McDowell 14 ^
Class AAA - Greenville 42, General McLane 6
Class AA - Sharon 13, Wilmington 6
Class A - Sharpsville 61, Linesville 12

1998
Class AAAA - Cathedral Prep 34, Meadville 0
Class AAA - Oil City 25, General McLane 18
Class AA - Sharon 35, Wilmington 7
Class A - Kennedy Christian 6, Sharpsville 3

1997
Class AAAA - McDowell 21, Erie Central 7
Class AAA - Greenville 35, Grove City 6
Class AA - Wilmington 42, Sharon
Class A - Sharpsville 14, Cambridge Springs 7 ~

1996
Class AAAA - McDowell 24, Erie Central 0
Class AAA - Greenville 24, Corry 0
Class AA - Wilmington 19, Northwestern 7
Class A - Cambridge Springs 13, Sharpsville 10 OT

1995
Class AAAA - McDowell 14, Cathedral Prep 0
Class AAA - Sharon 20, Greenville 6 ^
Class AA - Wilmington 21, Grove City 19
Class A - Iroquois 31, Eisenhower 15

1994
Class AAAA - Erie Central 28, Cathedral Prep 15
Class AAA - Sharon 36, Strong Vincent 12 ^
Class AA - Wilmington 27, Mercer 0
Class A - Kennedy Christian 16, Eisenhower 15

1993
Class AAAA - Erie Central 21, Cathedral Prep 15
Class AAA - Greenville 9, Sharon 7
Class AA - Northwestern 7, Mercer 6
Class A - Eisenhower 15, Maplewood 0

1992
Class AAAA - Cathedral Prep 14, McDowell 13
Class AAA - Sharon 22, Corry 0
Class AA - Fairview 13, Northwestern 6
Class A - Eisenhower 15, Iroquois 14

1991
Class AAAA - Cathedral Prep 13, Meadville 0 ^
Class AAA - Strong Vincent 14, Sharon 10 ~
Class AA - Hickory 21, Greenville 20
Class A - Iroquois 36, Eisenhower 12

1990
Class AAAA - Cathedral Prep 21, Meadville 7
Class AAA - Sharon 28, Strong Vincent
Class AA - Fort LeBoeuf 20, Fairview 13
Class A - Iroquois 13, Eisenhower 10 2OT

1989
Class AAAA - Cathedral Prep 21, Franklin 6
Class AAA - Reynolds 26, Titusville 12
Class AA - Hickory 34, Fairview 10 ~
Class A - Kennedy Christian 27, Linesville 22

1988
Division I - Cathedral Prep 12, Sharon 10
Division II - Hickory 32, Reynolds 20
Division III - Cambridge Springs 16, Saegertown 3 ^

1987
Division I - Cathedral Prep 18, Sharon 0
Division II - Reynolds 33, Grove City 7
Division III - Conneaut Valley 28, Kennedy Christian 7

1986
Division I - Cathedral Prep 9, Meadville 0
Division II - Reynolds 41, Lakeview 6
Division III - Sharpsville 7, Cambridge Springs 6

1985
Division I - Sharon 53, Greenville 7
Division II - Northwestern 40, Reynolds 7
Division III - Farrell 50, Kennedy Christian 8

~PIAA State Champions ^PIAA Runner-Up

D-10 Titles	School	Last
29	Cathedral Prep	2024
17	McDowell	2025
15	Wilmington	2024
14	Farrell	2025
14	Sharon	2025
12	Hickory	2024
9	Sharpsville	2014
7	Reynolds	2022
5	Strong Vincent (Note: Strong Vincent, Erie East, and Erie Central Tech consolidated to form Erie High School for 2017-18 School Year.)	2008
5	Oil City	2025
5	Grove City	2022
5	Greenville	2025
4	Kennedy Catholic (Note: Kennedy Catholic's football team dissolved after 2010.)	2005
4	Meadville	2023
4	General McLane	2024
3	Iroquois	1995
3	West Middlesex	2006
3	Cambridge Springs	2023
2	Central Tech	1994
2	Eisenhower	1993
2	Northwestern	1993
2	Slippery Rock	2003
1	Fairview	1992
1	Fort LeBoeuf	1990
1	Mercyhurst Prep	2007
1	Lakeview	2013
1	Conneaut Valley (Note: Conneaut Lake, Conneaut Valley, and Linesville consolidated to form Conneaut (aka CASH/Conneaut Area).)	1987
1	Conneaut	2014
1	Erie	2017

==== Varsity Cup ====
In 2011, the Erie Times News created the Varsity Cup to be awarded to the highest-performing athletic program in District 10.

Varsity Cup Champions

2011: Mercyhurst Prep
2012: Cathedral Prep/Villa Maria
