= Philadelphia Public League =

High School sports league in Philadelphia, Pennsylvania, United States

The Philadelphia Public League (PPL) is the interscholastic sports league for the public high schools of Philadelphia. The league traces its origin to 1901, with the formation of the Philadelphia Interscholastic League, a conference encompassing all the city's high schools, public and private. Prior to this, the public and private schools in the area had been competing among themselves for several years in a number of sports, including football and basketball. Basketball and track and field were the first recognized sports in 1901, but football, although not formally on the schedule, engaged all the same teams, and newspapers usually recognized the school with the best record as the informal interscholastic champion. In 1902, baseball and crew were added to the schedule.

== History ==
Initially, the Public League comprised the four public schools that withdrew from the Interscholastic League—Central, Central Manual, Northeast, and Southern—as well as West Philadelphia High. Germantown Academy, a private school, joined a few years later. Overbrook, Frankford, Simon Gratz, Olney, and Roxborough would join the league over the next couple of decades.

Football, basketball, rifle, outdoor track, crew, and baseball were offered in the first school year of competition, 1911–12. Crew was especially popular in Philadelphia, as the University of Pennsylvania sponsored interscholastic meets for the sport and encouraged its adoption by the city high schools. Soccer and cross country were added just before World War I, and the 1920s saw the introduction of swimming, gymnastics, golf, and tennis. The league experimented with indoor track (1915–21), ice hockey (1922), and bowling (1930–32), but these sports drew insufficient interest to sustain them. Crew was dropped by the league in 1919, which was a great blow to Central High, which for decades had one of the strongest rowing programs in the country.

== Members ==
The early members in the Philadelphia Interscholastic League included Brown Preparatory School, Camden High School, Central High School, Central Manual Training School, Drexel Institute, Eastburn Academy, Friends' Central School, and Northeast, and beginning in 1909 Southern High School. At least twelve different private schools—secular, Quaker, and Catholic— were members, the most notable being Brown Preparatory, Roman Catholic, Friends Central Select, and LaSalle. In 1911, the public school members withdrew from the league to form the Philadelphia High School League.

== See also ==
- Philadelphia Catholic League
