= North Penn Junior/Senior High School =

Coordinates: 41.680874°N 77.062864°W

Location
- 300 Morris Street; Blossburg, Pennsylvania 16912

Information
- School type: Public Junior/Senior High School
- School district: Southern Tioga
- NCES District ID: 4222370
- Superintendent: Keith Yarger
- NCES School ID: 422237004071
- Principal: Albert Lindner
- Faculty: 29
- Grades: 7-12
- Enrollment: 305 (2009-10 School Term)
- Student to teacher ratio: 11:1
- Colors: Blue and White
- Team name: Panthers
- Feeder schools: Blossburg Elementary School

North Penn Junior/Senior High School is one of three secondary facilities that make up the Southern Tioga School District. The school serves around 300 students in grades 7-12 and as a total of about 40 Faculty and Staff personnel.

== History ==
The school was built in 1935, was renovated in 1990, and structural addition was placed in 1996.

== Athletics ==
North Penn participates in PIAA District IV:

- Basketball - Class A
- Football - Class A
- Track and Field - Class AA
