= Sharpsville Area School District =

School district in Pennsylvania

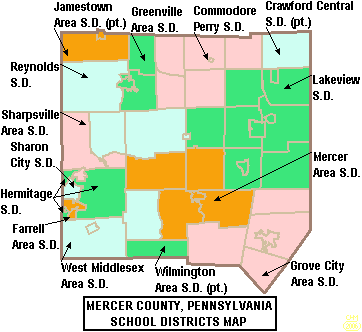

Address
- 1 Blue Devil Way Sharpsville, Mercer County, Pennsylvania; United States

District information
- Type: Public

Other information
- Website: www.sharpsville.k12.pa.us

The Sharpsville Area School District is a small, suburban/rural, public school district serving parts of Mercer County, Pennsylvania. The district is one of the 500 public school districts of Pennsylvania. The district's attendance area encompasses the communities of Sharpsville, Clark, and Pymatuning Township. The Sharpsville Area School District encompasses approximately 29 square miles (75 km^{2}). According to 2010 federal census data, it serves a resident population of 7,408. In 2009, the Sharpsville Area School District residents’ per capita income was $19,471, while the median family income was $44,213. In the Commonwealth, the median family income was $49,501 and the United States median family income was $49,445, in 2010.

Sharpsville Area School District operates Sharpsville Area Elementary School, Sharpsville Area Middle School, and Sharpsville Area Senior High School. The middle and high schools are connected- and as a direct result, many staff members and several rooms are shared between the two.

== Extracurriculars ==
Sharpsville Area School District offers a wide variety of clubs, activities and an extensive sports program.

=== Sports ===
The district funds:

Boys

- Baseball - AA
- Basketball - AA
- Cross Country - A
- Football - A
- Golf - AA
- Soccer - AA
- Track and Field - AA
- Wrestling - AA

Girls

- Basketball - AA
- Cross Country - A
- Soccer (Fall) - A
- Softball - A
- Track and Field - AA
- Volleyball

Middle School Sports

Boys

- Basketball
- Cross Country
- Football
- Soccer
- Track and Field
- Wrestling

Girls

- Basketball
- Cross Country
- Soccer
- Track and Field
- Volleyball

According to PIAA directory July 2013
