= Conemaugh Valley School District =

School district in Pennsylvania

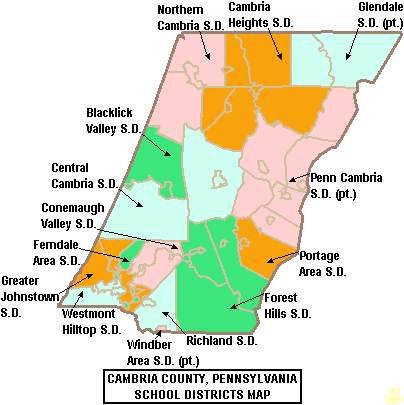

Conemaugh Valley School District is a school district in Cambria County, Pennsylvania, United States. Schools include the Conemaugh Valley Elementary School and Conemaugh Valley High School.

== Extracurriculars ==
The Conemaugh Valley School District offers a wide variety of clubs, activities and an extensive, publicly funded sports program.

=== Athletics ===
The school district offers:

Varsity

Boys

- Baseball - A
- Basketball- A
- Football - A
- Golf - AA

Girls

- Basketball - A
- Golf - AA
- Softball - A
- Swimming and Diving - AAA
- Volleyball - A

Junior High Middle School Sports

Boys

- Baseball
- Basketball
- Football
- Golf

Girls

- Basketball
- Golf
- Softball
- Volleyball

According to PIAA directory July 2014
