= Cheltenham High School =

Public high school in Pennsylvania, U.S.

Coordinates: 40.087°N 75.160°W

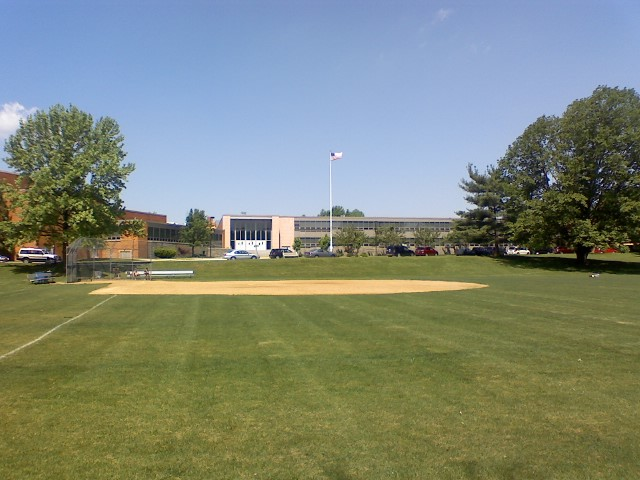
- Cheltenham High School in May 2010

Location
- 500 Rices Mill Road; Wyncote, Montgomery County, Pennsylvania 19095-1942; United States

Information
- School type: Public
- Motto: Salubritas et Eruditio (Health and Education)
- Established: 1884
- Status: Open
- School board: Cheltenham Township School District
- NCES District ID: 4205760
- Authority: Pennsylvania Department of Education
- Governing Township: Township of Cheltenham, Pennsylvania
- Authorizer: United States Department of Education
- NCES School ID: 420576003260
- Principal: Ben Hammond
- Faculty: 102.55 (on an FTE basis)
- Grades: 9–12
- Gender: Co-Educational
- Enrollment: 1,457 (2023-2024) enrolled
- Student to teacher ratio: 14.21 ratio
- Schedule type: Semester
- Schedule: 4 Blocks
- Hours in school day: 7:30 AM-2:30 PM
- Area: 47 acres
- Colors: Blue and Gold
- Athletics: PIAA; District 1
- Athletics conference: Suburban One American
- Sports: Golf, football, soccer, tennis, baseball, softball, lacrosse, color guard, Wrestling, volleyball, basketball, swimming, diving, track and field, Winter track, field hockey, cross country
- Mascot: Panther
- Team name: Cheltenham Panthers, Cheltenham Lady Panthers
- Rival: Abington Senior High School
- Newspaper: The Cheltonian
- Yearbook: El Delator
- Communities served: Arcadia University, Cedarbrook, Cheltenham, Edge Hill, Elkins Park, Glenside, La Mott, Laverock, Melrose Park, Wyncote
- Feeder schools: Cedarbrook Middle School
- Website: chs.cheltenham.org
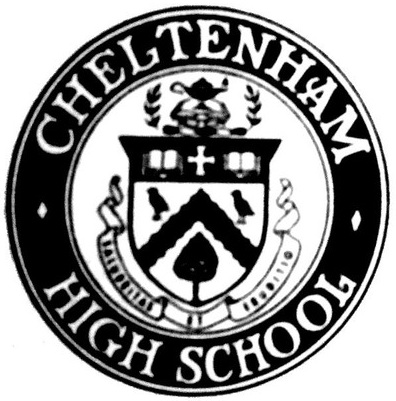
- The Seal of Cheltenham High School

Cheltenham High School is a public high school in the Wyncote neighborhood of Cheltenham Township, in the U.S. state of Pennsylvania, located 0.5 miles (800 m) from the border of the city of Philadelphia and 12 miles (19 km) from Center City. Serving grades 9 through 12, Cheltenham is the only high school in the School District of Cheltenham Township. It is fed by Cedarbrook Middle School, the only school in the school district for grades 6, 7, and 8.

In 2017–18 the student ethnicity was distributed as follows: 54% Black, 31% White, 8% Asian, and 5% Hispanic. The school has approximately 1400 students in grades 9 through 12, with a student-teacher ratio of about 12:1.

Cheltenham's athletic teams are known as the Cheltenham Panthers and are members of the PIAA District 1 in the American Conference of the Suburban One League. They have a long-standing tradition of holding a Thanksgiving Day football game against their cross-town rival, Abington Senior High School. The rivalry celebrated its 100th year in 2015.

== History ==
=== 19th century ===
Cheltenham High School was established in 1884 and is one of the oldest public high schools in Pennsylvania.

=== 20th century ===
The first location was on Ashbourne Road, and at the time of its closing in 1953, it was considered the oldest public school site in continuous use. The next building was at High School Road and Montgomery Avenue in Elkins Park.

Present-day Cheltenham High School, located at 500 Rices Mill Road in Wyncote, was built in 1959. It sits on a land area of approximately 47 acres, and is bound by Route 309, Route 152, Panther Road, Rices Mill Road, Carlton Avenue, and Old Mill Road.

=== 21st century ===
In 2004, the school adopted a stricter dress code because the administration felt that clothing that was too loose could hide identity badges and make identifying occupants more difficult.

== Extracurriculars ==
Cheltenham Township School District offers a wide variety of clubs, activities and an extensive sports program.

=== Athletics ===
Cheltenham Panthers
- School: Cheltenham High School
- Nickname: Panthers
- PIAA: District 1 Suburban One League
- Conference: American Conference; AAAA; AAA
- Location: Wyncote, Pennsylvania, United States
- Football stadium: Alumni Stadium
- Colors: Blue and Gold
- Website: http://www.cheltenham.org/Page/2723

CHS is a member of the Pennsylvania Interscholastic Athletic Association (PIAA) and in the Suburban One American Conference (SOL). It was one of the founding members of the SOL in 1922, and is one of 4 of the remaining original schools. Cheltenham Athletics promote sportsmanship above self, and therefore, consistently receive the SOL Sportsmanship Award. Cheltenham has teams in the following sports: Asterisk designates available to both boys and girls.

==== Fall sports ====
- Cross country running*
- Boys football
- Soccer*
- Color Guard*
- Girls tennis
- Girls volleyball
- Coed cheerleading
- Girls field hockey
- Coed unified cheer

==== Winter sports ====
- Basketball *
- Color Guard*
- Indoor Track*
- Swimming/Diving *
- Boys wrestling

==== Spring sports ====
- Boys baseball
- Boys tennis
- Track & field
- Cross country
- Color Guard*
- Boys volleyball
- Coed unified track
- Lacrosse
- Girls softball

==== Girls Basketball Team ====
The Cheltenham Girls basketball team won the PIAA AAAA state championship in 2000, and again in 2007. They have won PIAA District 1 titles, and the Suburban One American Conference 23 times. Coach Bob Schaefer won his 700th game on February 5, 2010, and has coached the Panthers for 30 years. He has coached the WBCA All-American Forward, Laura Harper, who played in the WNBA and is the current head coach at Coppin State. Harper scored 2007 points during her Cheltenham Career. In 2007 (their 2nd championship year), the Panthers were honored by the Philadelphia Sports Hall of Fame with the "Pride of Philadelphia Award." The award is given to individuals or teams who have "represented the Philadelphia area with dignity, determination, and class through athletic achievement. " On Tuesday March 27, 2012, Schafer resigned from his 31-year post as the Lady Panthers head coach. He finished with a 757-163 record, 2 PIAA AAAA state titles, 2 state runner-up, 4 District I Championships, and the Suburban One League champions 24 out of the last 26 years. Schaefer, a West Hazleton native, was inducted into the Hazleton Area Sports Hall of Fame in September, 2012.

==== Girls Track and Field ====
The Cheltenham Girls Track and Field Team has won six state championships. They have won four indoor PTFCA indoor state championships (2014, 2015, 2016, 2017) and two outdoor PIAA State Championships (2015, 2016). They have also won seven PIAA District 1 championships (2013 - 2019)

==== Cheltenham–Abington rivalry ====
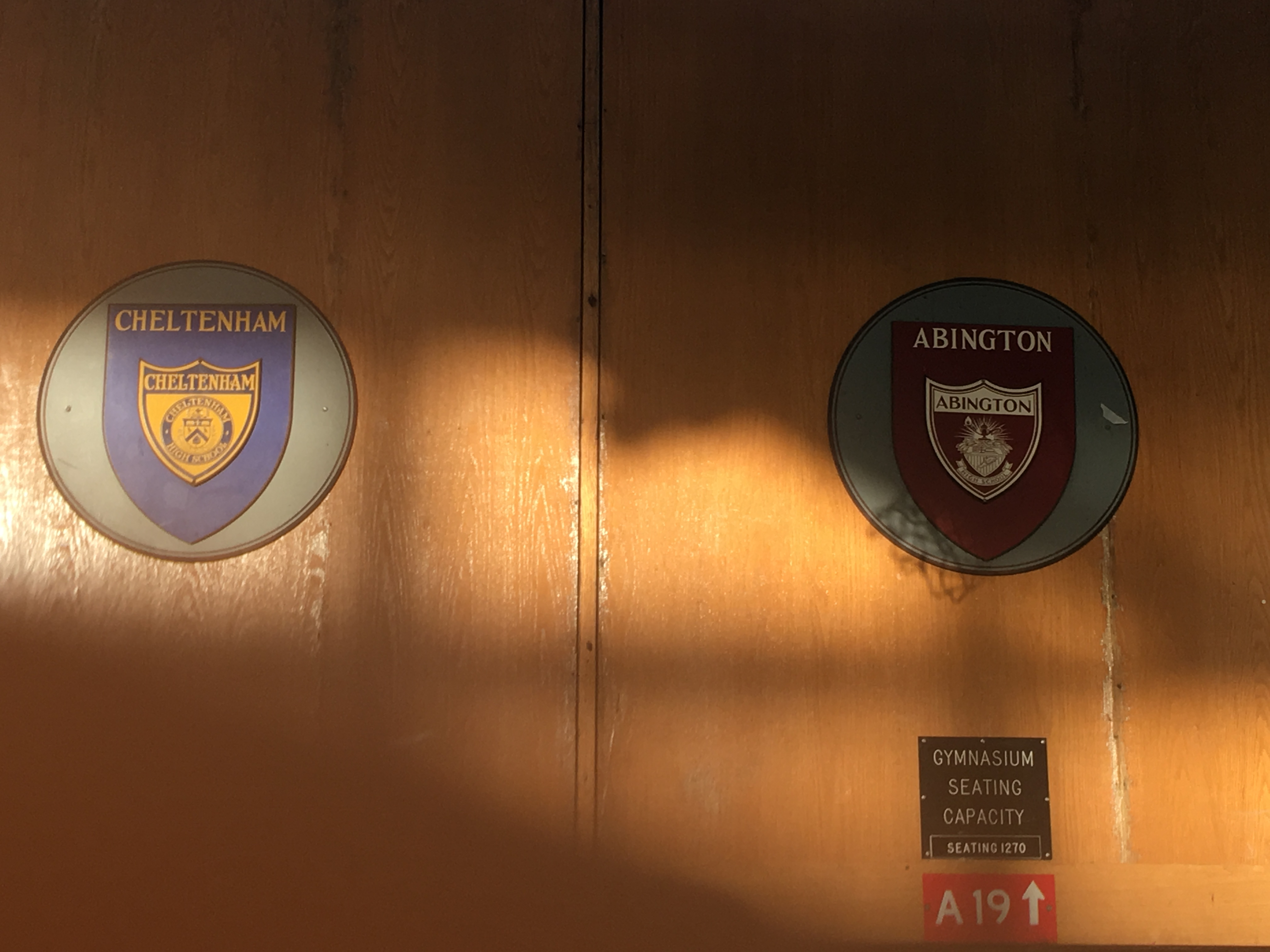
The Cheltenham and Abington logos next to each other in the Abington Senior High School gymnasium

The Cheltenham–Abington rivalry, also known as "The Turkey Bowl", is a football game played between the Cheltenham Panthers and the Abington Galloping Ghosts. It has been played annually on Thanksgiving Day since 1915, unless one of the teams has conflicts with PIAA playoffs. The rivalry is the fifth-oldest public high school rivalry in Pennsylvania, and the seventh-oldest including private schools. The schools are less than 2 miles apart. Despite not being in the same conference, the rivalry is prevalent in other sports, mainly basketball. In some sports, the teams do not play each other at all. Abington leads the overall series 55–34-6.

== Notable alumni ==
The Cheltenham High School Hall of Fame was established to "acknowledge the achievements of our alma mater's most remarkable graduates". The first class was in 1981, and have had inductions in 1984, 1987, 1993, 1996, 1999, and 2002. Hall of Fame inductees have a HoF next to their name.

- Michael Baylson, '57, Federal judge, U.S. District Court for the Eastern District of Pennsylvania HoF
- Brandon Bing, '07, former college football player, Rutgers
- Michael Brecker, '67, Grammy Award-winning jazz musician HoF
- Randy Brecker, '63, Grammy Award-winning jazz musician HoF
- Michael Stuart Brown '58, 1985 Nobel Prize in Medicine recipient HoF
- Ilene Chaiken, TV director, producer, and writer
- Laurie Colwin, '62, author and columnist HoF
- Wesley E. Craig, '64, US Army major general
- Rebecca Creskoff, '88, actress
- Tom Feeney, Member of Congress, R-FL
- Stuart F. Feldman, '54, co-founder of Vietnam Veterans of America
- Glenn A. Fine, Inspector General, U.S. Department of Justice HoF
- Wilmot E. Fleming, '35, State Senator HoF
- Jon D. Fox, '65, U.S. Congressman HoF
- Patricia Greenspan, '62, philosopher
- Robert Greenstein, '63, founder and president, Center on Budget and Policy Priorities HoF
- Laura Harper, '04, professional basketball player
- Trina Schart Hyman, '56, artist and illustrator HoF
- Reggie Jackson, '64, professional baseball player HoF
- Maxine Kumin '42, poet and novelist HoF
- Mark Levin, '75, conservative talk radio host
- Richard Levinson, '52, Emmy Award-winning writer and producer HoF
- Chad Levitt, '93, NFL football player
- Franz Lidz, '69, journalist, The New York Times and Sports Illustrated, memoirist, NBA executive
- Lil Dicky, '06, rapper
- William Link, '52, Emmy Award-Winning writer and producer HoF
- Craig Littlepage, '69, college administrator and educator HoF
- Jeff Lorber, '70, musician HoF'
- Mary Ellen Mark, '58, photojournalist HoF
- Chris Myarick, '14, professional football player, Miami Dolphins and New York Giants
- Robert J. Myers, '29, co-creator, U.S. Social Security program HoF
- Benjamin "Bibi" Netanyahu, '67, Prime Minister of Israel HoF
- Yonatan "Yoni" Netanyahu (1946–1976), '64, Israeli military officer HoF
- Ronald Perelman, '60, philanthropist
- David Saxon, '37, physicist, educator, and administrator HoF
- Norma Shapiro, '45, U.S. District Court judge HoF
- Ronald M. Shapiro, '60, sports agent, corporate attorney, and author HoF
- Robert C. Solomon, '60, philosopher HoF
- Jeffrey Sonnenfeld, academic administrator and professor, Yale School of Management
- Jonathan E. Steinberg, television producer, screenwriter, and director
- Dan Trachtenberg, '99, filmmaker
- Wallace Triplett, '45, professional football player HoF
- Kate Vrijmoet, '84, artist
- Chris Williams, '02, professional soccer player, Miami FC

=== Notable faculty ===
- Paul Westhead Former Cheltenham Boys Basketball Coach, Oregon Ducks women's basketball coach; also coached the Los Angeles Lakers, Chicago Bulls, Denver Nuggets, and La Salle Explorers, among others.

Preceded by Upper St. Clair High School; Parkland High School	PIAA AAAA Girls Basketball State Champions; 2000; 2007	Succeeded by Oakland Catholic High School; Central Dauphin High School
Preceded by Bensalem High School	PIAA AAA Boys Track & Field State Champions; 2014; 2015	Succeeded by State College Area High School
Preceded by Pennsbury High School	PIAA AAA Girls Track & Field State Champions; 2015; 2016	Succeeded by Incumbent
