= Cheltenham Township School District =

School district in Pennsylvania

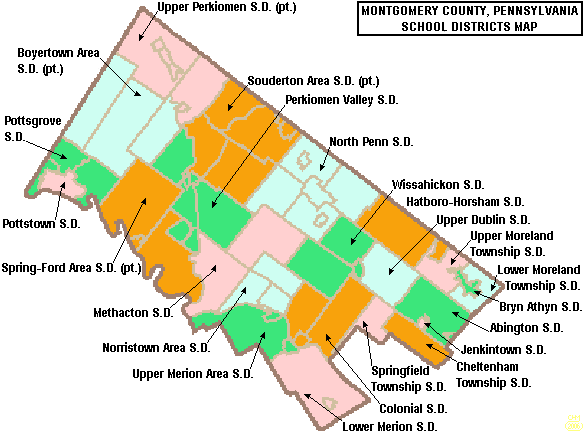

Address
- 2000 Ashbourne Road Elkins Park, Montgomery, Pennsylvania, 19027-1031; United States

District information
- Type: Public
- Motto: Salubritas et Eruditio; Where Excellence Begins With Education
- NCES District ID: 4205760

Students and staff
- Students: 4,240
- Teachers: 340
- District mascot: Panthers

Other information
- Website: https://www.cheltenham.org/

The Cheltenham Township School District is a public school district serving Cheltenham Township in Montgomery County, Pennsylvania. The district is one of the 500 public school districts of Pennsylvania. The District encompasses approximately 9 square miles (23 km^{2}). According to 2020 federal census data, it serves a resident population of 37,452.

The district median family income in 2022 is $129,338, up from $76,792 in 2009.

According to 2017-21 ACS-ED data, the district serves a resident population of 37,331. The median household income is $96,136 versus a state median income of $67,587, and national median income of $69,021.

== Schools ==
The district operates seven schools.

- Cheltenham Elementary (K-5th) - Serves Cheltenham Village
- Wyncote Elementary (K-5th) - Serves Wyncote, and parts of Elkins Park
- Glenside Elementary (K-5th) - Serves Glenside
- Myers Elementary (K-5th) - Serves Melrose Park and La Mott
- Elkins Park Middle School (5th-6th) - Serves all communities (Closed in 2024)
- Cedarbrook Middle School (7th-8th) - Serves all communities (by 2030 will be a 6th to 8th grade building)
- Cheltenham High School (9th-12th) - Serves all communities
