= Langhorne Manor, Pennsylvania =

Borough in Pennsylvania, US

- Borough
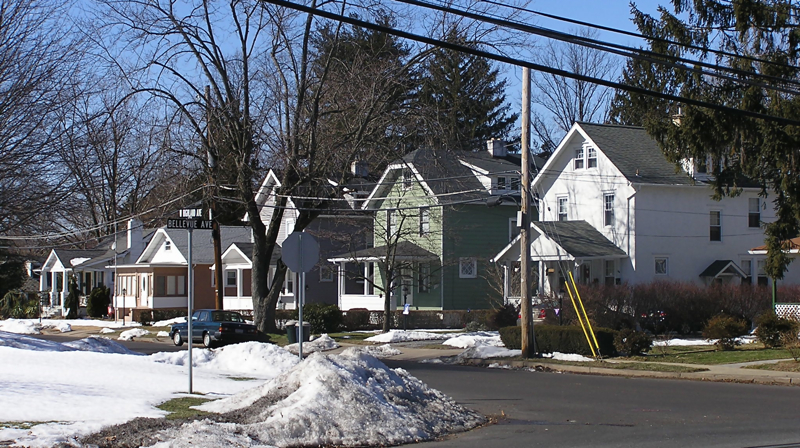
- Residential neighborhood in Langhorne Manor

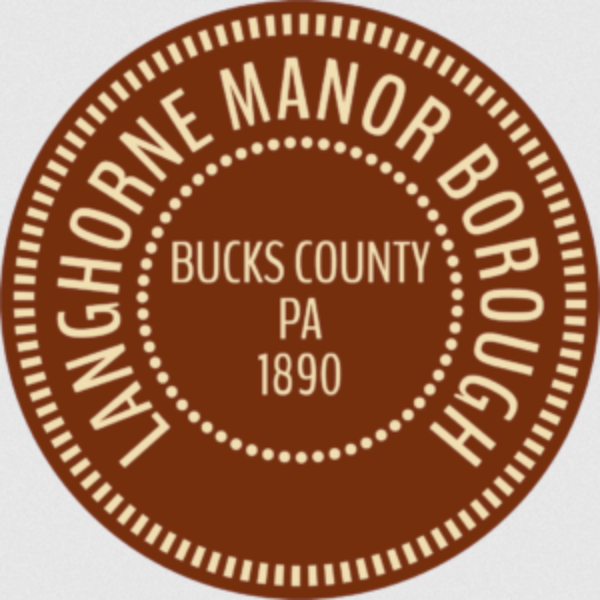
- Seal

- Location in Bucks County, Pennsylvania

- Location in Pennsylvania Location in the United States
- Coordinates: 40°09′57″N 74°55′04″W
- Country: United States
- State: Pennsylvania
- County: Bucks

Government
  - Mayor: Robert Byrne

Area
  - Total: 0.60 sq mi (1.56 km^{2})
  - Land: 0.60 sq mi (1.55 km^{2})
  - Water: 0.0039 sq mi (0.01 km^{2})
- Elevation: 220 ft (67 m)

Population (2020)
  - Total: 1,496
  - Density: 2,501.1/sq mi (965.67/km^{2})
- Time zone: UTC-5 (Eastern (EST))
  - Summer (DST): UTC-4 (EDT)
- ZIP Code: 19047
- Area codes: 215, 267 and 445
- FIPS code: 42-41416
- Website: langhornemanor.org

Langhorne Manor is a borough in Bucks County, Pennsylvania, United States. As of the 2020 census, Langhorne Manor had a population of 1,496. The mayor of Langhorne Manor is Bob Byrne.

== History ==
Langhorne Manor was named after Jeremiah Langhorne. The Langhorne Manor School was listed on the National Register of Historic Places in 2008.

== Geography ==
Langhorne Manor is located at 40°9′57″N 74°55′4″W (40.165859, -74.917795). According to the U.S. Census Bureau, the borough has a total area of 0.6 square miles (1.6 km^{2}), all land.

== Demographics ==
Historical population
Census	Pop.	Note	%±
1900	222		—
1910	170		−23.4%
1920	207		21.8%
1930	397		91.8%
1940	477		20.2%
1950	781		63.7%
1960	1,506		92.8%
1970	1,081		−28.2%
1980	1,103		2.0%
1990	807		−26.8%
2000	927		14.9%
2010	1,442		55.6%
2020	1,496		3.7%

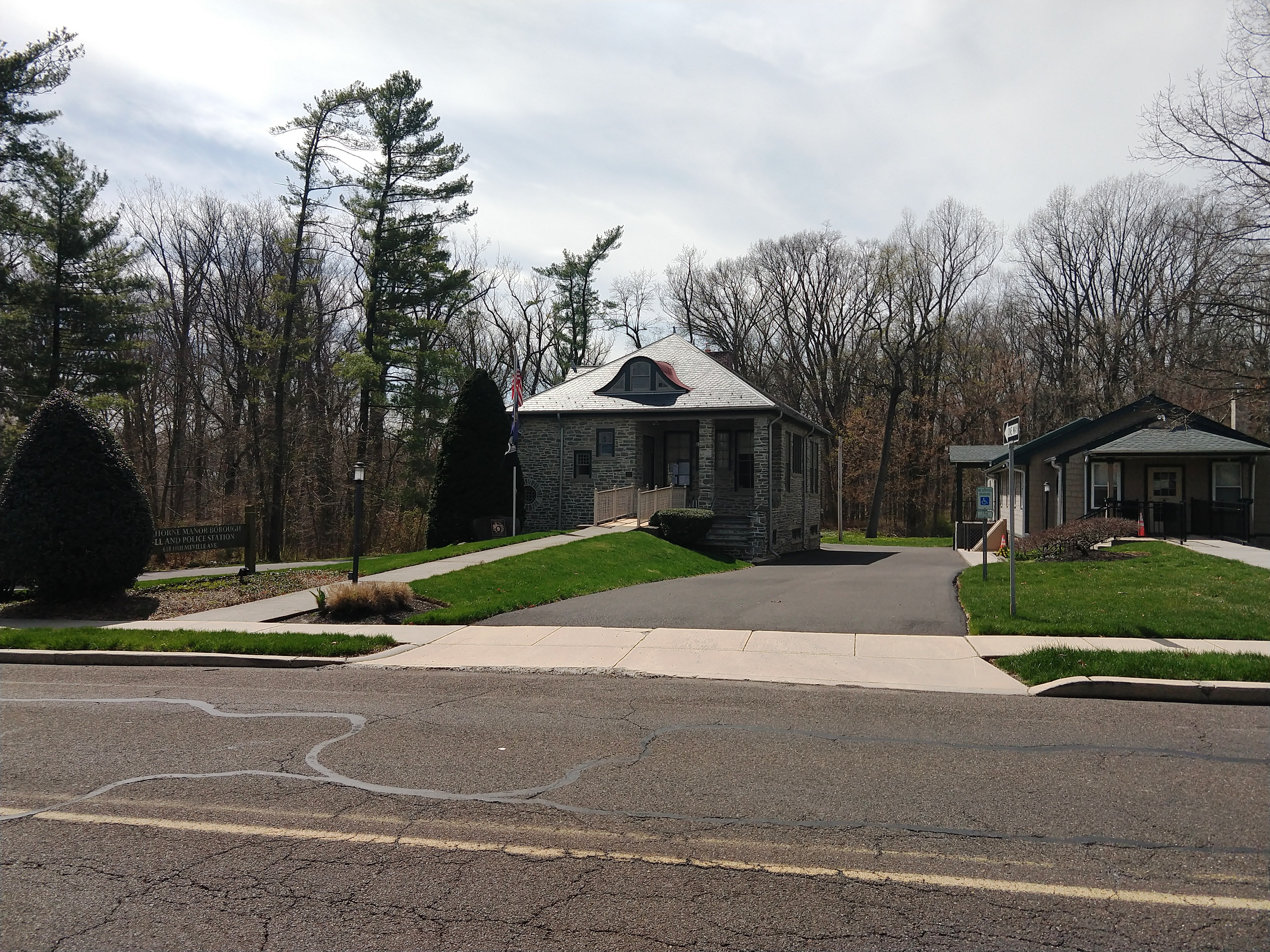
Langhorne Manor Borough Hall

As of the 2010 census, the borough was 89.9% Non-Hispanic White, 4.1% Black or African American, 0.2% Native American, 1.5% Asian, and 1.7% were two or more races. 3.3% of the population were of Hispanic or Latino ancestry.

As of the 2000 census, there were 927 people, 330 households, and 258 families living in the borough. The population density was 1,559.7 inhabitants per square mile (602.2/km^{2}). There were 336 housing units at an average density of 565.3 per square mile (218.3/km^{2}). The racial makeup of the borough was 94.28% White, 3.24% African American, 0.11% Native American, 1.40% Asian, 0.43% from other races, and 0.54% from two or more races. Hispanic or Latino of any race were 1.08% of the population.

There were 330 households, out of which 31.8% had children under the age of 18 living with them, 65.2% were married couples living together, 10.6% had a female householder with no husband present, and 21.8% were non-families. 14.8% of all households were made up of individuals, and 5.2% had someone living alone who was 65 years of age or older. The average household size was 2.81 and the average family size was 3.14.

In the borough the population was spread out, with 23.6% under the age of 18, 7.1% from 18 to 24, 30.6% from 25 to 44, 25.5% from 45 to 64, and 13.2% who were 65 years of age or older. The median age was 39 years. For every 100 females there were 94.7 males. For every 100 females age 18 and over, there were 93.4 males.

The median income for a household in the borough was $67,500, and the median income for a family was $77,721. Males had a median income of $45,833 versus $35,781 for females. The per capita income for the borough was $27,302. About 1.6% of families and 2.7% of the population were below the poverty line, including 2.3% of those under age 18 and none of those age 65 or over.

== Education ==
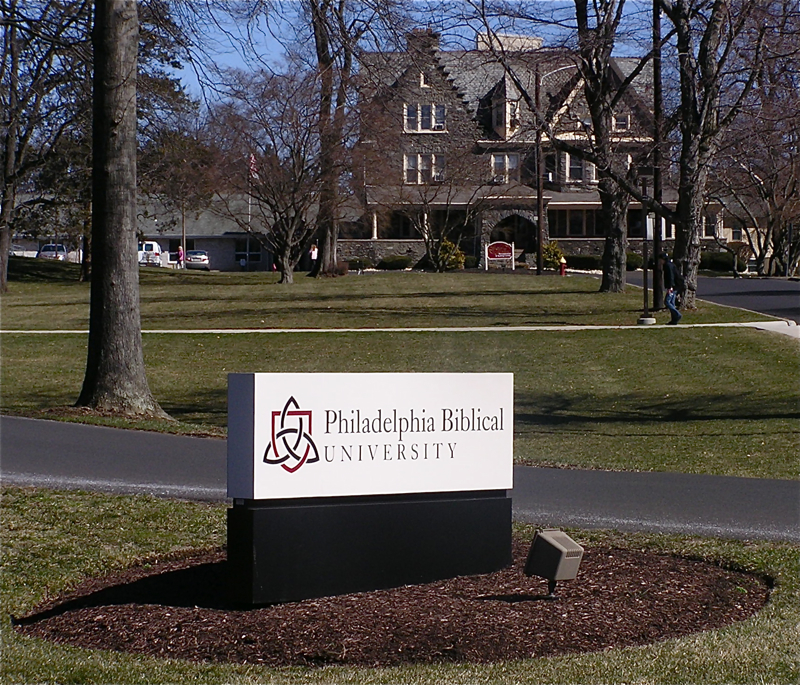
The Cairn University campus in Langhorne Manor

Langhorne Manor Borough is one of six municipalities served by the Neshaminy School District. Students residing in Langhorne Manor Borough attend Tawanka Elementary School for Kindergarten through 4th grades, Maple Point Middle School for 5th through 8th grades, and Neshaminy High School for 9th through 12th grades.

In 2002, Maple Point Middle School was awarded the Blue Ribbon, National Schools of Excellence Award. Oliver Heckman Elementary School in Middletown Township closed in 2016 in favor of the new Tawanka Elementary School in Lower Southampton Township. High school students may attend Bucks County Technical High School, a career oriented vocational school, located in Fairless Hills. Cairn University (formerly known as Philadelphia Biblical University) is partially located in Langhorne Manor Borough and partially in Middletown Township.

== Transportation ==
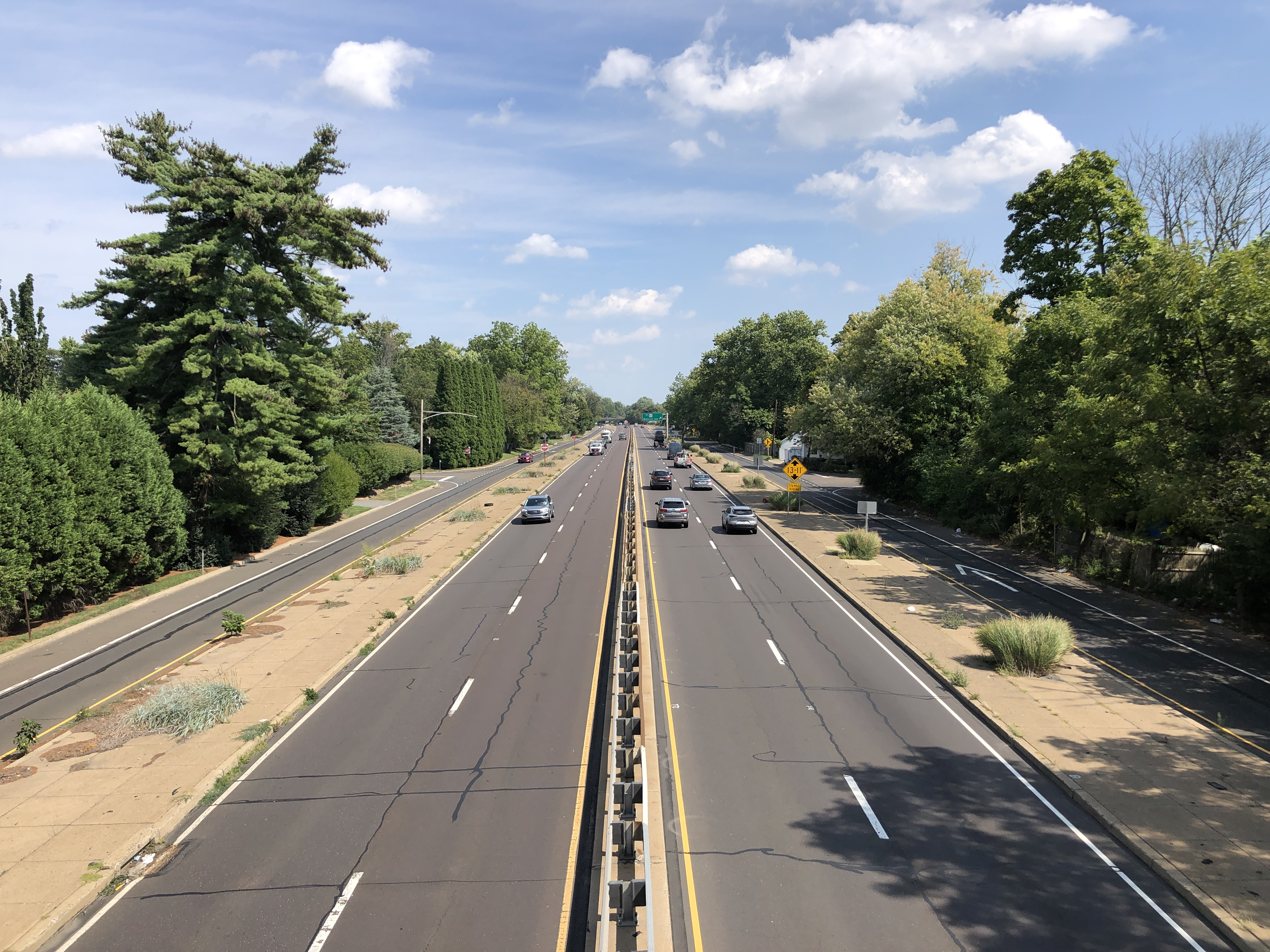
US 1 northbound in Langhorne Manor

As of 2017 there were 8.36 miles (13.45 km) of public roads in Langhorne Manor, of which 2.10 miles (3.38 km) were maintained by the Pennsylvania Department of Transportation (PennDOT) and 6.26 miles (10.07 km) were maintained by the borough.

U.S. Route 1 is the primary highway traversing Langhorne Manor, after a southwest–northeast alignment across the northwestern portion of the borough. Pennsylvania Route 413 also crosses the borough, following a northwest–southeast alignment via Bellevue Avenue.

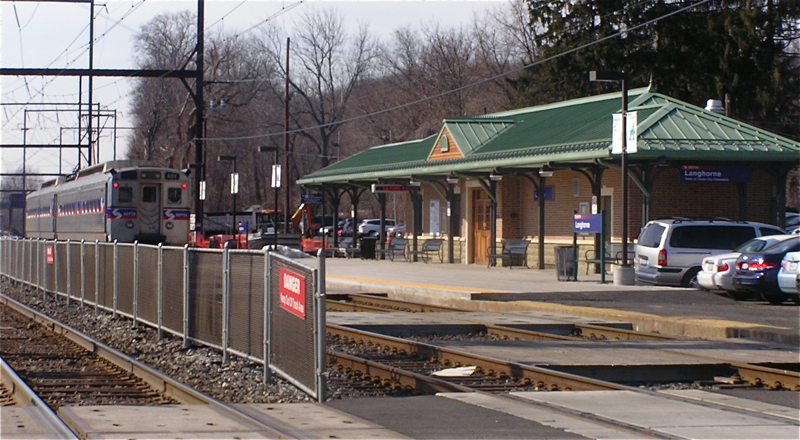
SEPTA's Langhorne regional rail station on the West Trenton Line is in Langhorne Manor

The Langhorne station serving SEPTA Regional Rail's West Trenton Line is in the borough. SEPTA provides bus service to Langhorne Manor along City Bus Route 14, which runs between the Frankford Transportation Center in Northeast Philadelphia and the Oxford Valley Mall, and Suburban Bus Route 130, which runs between Frankford Avenue and Knights Road in Northeast Philadelphia and Bucks County Community College in Newtown.

== Climate ==
According to the Köppen climate classification system, Langhorne Manor has a Hot-summer, Humid continental climate (Dfa). Dfa climates are characterized by at least one month having an average mean temperature ≤ 32.0 °F (0.0 °C), at least four months with an average mean temperature ≥ 50.0 °F (10.0 °C), at least one month with an average mean temperature ≥ 71.6 °F (22.0 °C) and no significant precipitation difference between seasons. Although most summer days are slightly humid in Langhorne Manor, episodes of heat and high humidity can occur, with heat index values > 108 °F (42 °C). Since 1981, the highest air temperature was 102.8 °F (39.3 °C) on July 22, 2011, and the highest daily average mean dew point was 75.4 °F (24.1 °C) on August 13, 2016. The average wettest month is July, which corresponds with the annual peak in thunderstorm activity. Since 1981, the wettest calendar day was 6.68 inches (170 mm) on August 27, 2011 when Hurricane Irene was affecting the area. During the winter months, the average annual extreme minimum air temperature is 0.6 °F (−17.4 °C). Since 1981, the coldest air temperature was −9.9 °F (−23.3 °C) on January 22, 1984. Episodes of extreme cold and wind can occur, with wind chill values < −10 °F (−23 °C). The average annual snowfall (Nov-Apr) is between 24 inches (61 cm) and 30 inches (76 cm). Ice storms and large snowstorms depositing ≥ 12 inches (30 cm) of snow occur once every few years, particularly during nor’easters from December through February.

Climate data for Langhorne Manor, Elevation 194 ft (59 m), 1981-2010 normals, extremes 1981-2018
Month	Jan	Feb	Mar	Apr	May	Jun	Jul	Aug	Sep	Oct	Nov	Dec	Year
Record high °F (°C)	71.6 (22.0)	77.8 (25.4)	87.4 (30.8)	94.5 (34.7)	95.4 (35.2)	96.7 (35.9)	102.8 (39.3)	100.4 (38.0)	98.4 (36.9)	88.3 (31.3)	81.1 (27.3)	75.9 (24.4)	102.8 (39.3)
Mean daily maximum °F (°C)	40.1 (4.5)	43.4 (6.3)	51.6 (10.9)	63.5 (17.5)	73.0 (22.8)	82.2 (27.9)	86.4 (30.2)	84.7 (29.3)	77.9 (25.5)	66.6 (19.2)	55.6 (13.1)	44.5 (6.9)	64.2 (17.9)
Daily mean °F (°C)	31.9 (−0.1)	34.5 (1.4)	41.9 (5.5)	52.6 (11.4)	62.0 (16.7)	71.5 (21.9)	76.1 (24.5)	74.6 (23.7)	67.4 (19.7)	55.9 (13.3)	46.2 (7.9)	36.4 (2.4)	54.3 (12.4)
Mean daily minimum °F (°C)	23.7 (−4.6)	25.7 (−3.5)	32.2 (0.1)	41.7 (5.4)	51.0 (10.6)	60.9 (16.1)	65.9 (18.8)	64.5 (18.1)	57.0 (13.9)	45.1 (7.3)	36.8 (2.7)	28.3 (−2.1)	44.5 (6.9)
Record low °F (°C)	−9.9 (−23.3)	−2.4 (−19.1)	4.1 (−15.5)	18.1 (−7.7)	33.7 (0.9)	42.4 (5.8)	48.6 (9.2)	43.3 (6.3)	36.4 (2.4)	25.5 (−3.6)	12.5 (−10.8)	0.1 (−17.7)	−9.9 (−23.3)
Average precipitation inches (mm)	3.55 (90)	2.75 (70)	4.20 (107)	3.93 (100)	4.30 (109)	4.30 (109)	5.14 (131)	4.34 (110)	4.32 (110)	3.76 (96)	3.56 (90)	4.02 (102)	48.17 (1,224)
Average relative humidity (%)	65.6	62.5	58.0	57.5	61.9	65.9	66.2	68.6	69.8	68.8	67.4	67.6	65.0
Average dew point °F (°C)	21.7 (−5.7)	23.0 (−5.0)	28.2 (−2.1)	38.0 (3.3)	48.8 (9.3)	59.5 (15.3)	64.0 (17.8)	63.6 (17.6)	57.2 (14.0)	45.8 (7.7)	36.0 (2.2)	26.7 (−2.9)	42.8 (6.0)
Source: PRISM

== Ecology ==
According to the A. W. Kuchler U.S. potential natural vegetation types, Langhorne Manor has a dominant vegetation type of Appalachian Oak (104) with a dominant vegetation form of Eastern Hardwood Forest (25). The plant hardiness zone is 7a with an average annual extreme minimum air temperature of 0.6 °F (−17.4 °C). The spring bloom typically begins by April 8 and fall color usually peaks by November 3.
