= Hulmeville Historic District =

Historic district in Pennsylvania, United States

- U.S. National Register of Historic Places
- U.S. Historic district
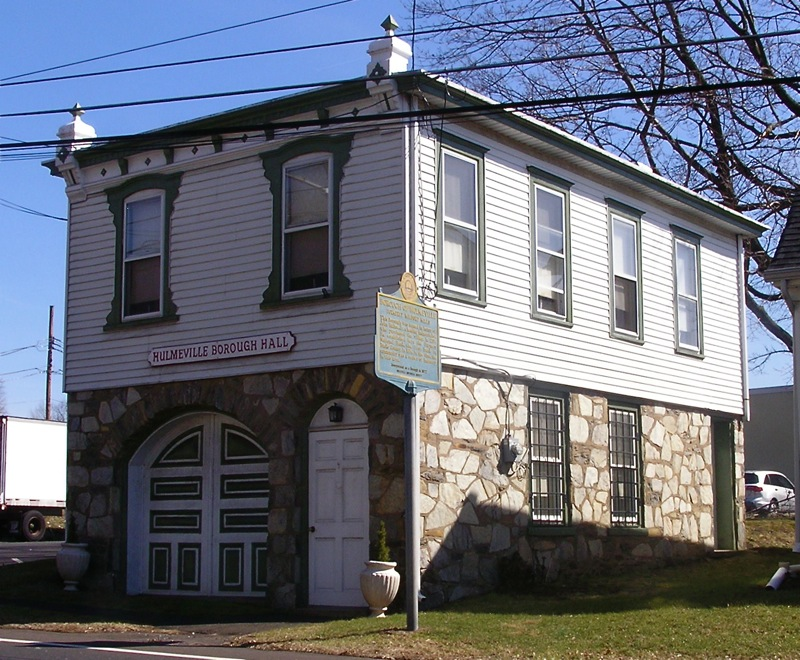
- Hulmeville Borough Hall, Hulmeville Historic District, March 2011

- Location within Pennsylvania Location within the United States
- Location: 2-4 Beaver St., 946-1101 Bellevue Ave., 1-111 Green, 4 Hulme, 3-342 Main Sts., 1-131 Trenton Ave., & 2-9 Water St., Hulmeville, Pennsylvania
- Coordinates: 40°08′34″N 74°54′35″W
- Area: 33 acres (13 ha)
- Built: 1792
- Built by: Haefner, Charles; Et al.
- Architectural style: Late Victorian, Greek Revival, Federal
- NRHP reference No.: 86001677
- Added to NRHP: July 17, 1986

The Hulmeville Historic District is a national historic district which is located in Hulmeville, Bucks County, Pennsylvania.

It was added to the National Register of Historic Places in 1986.

== History and architectural features ==
The district includes one hundred and three contributing buildings, three contributing structures, and one contributing object which are located in the borough of Hulmeville. They include a variety of residential, commercial, and institutional buildings, some of which are representative of the vernacular Greek Revival, Federal, and Late Victorian styles.

Notable buildings include the John Pryor/John Hulme House, which was built circa 1794, the Edward Hicks House, which was erected circa 1808, Johnson's Hall, which was built in 1871, the Hulmeville Borough Hall, which was erected in 1894, the Silas Barkley Mill, which was built in 1880, and the Episcopal church, which was erected in 1851.
