= Langhorne Manor School =

- U.S. National Register of Historic Places
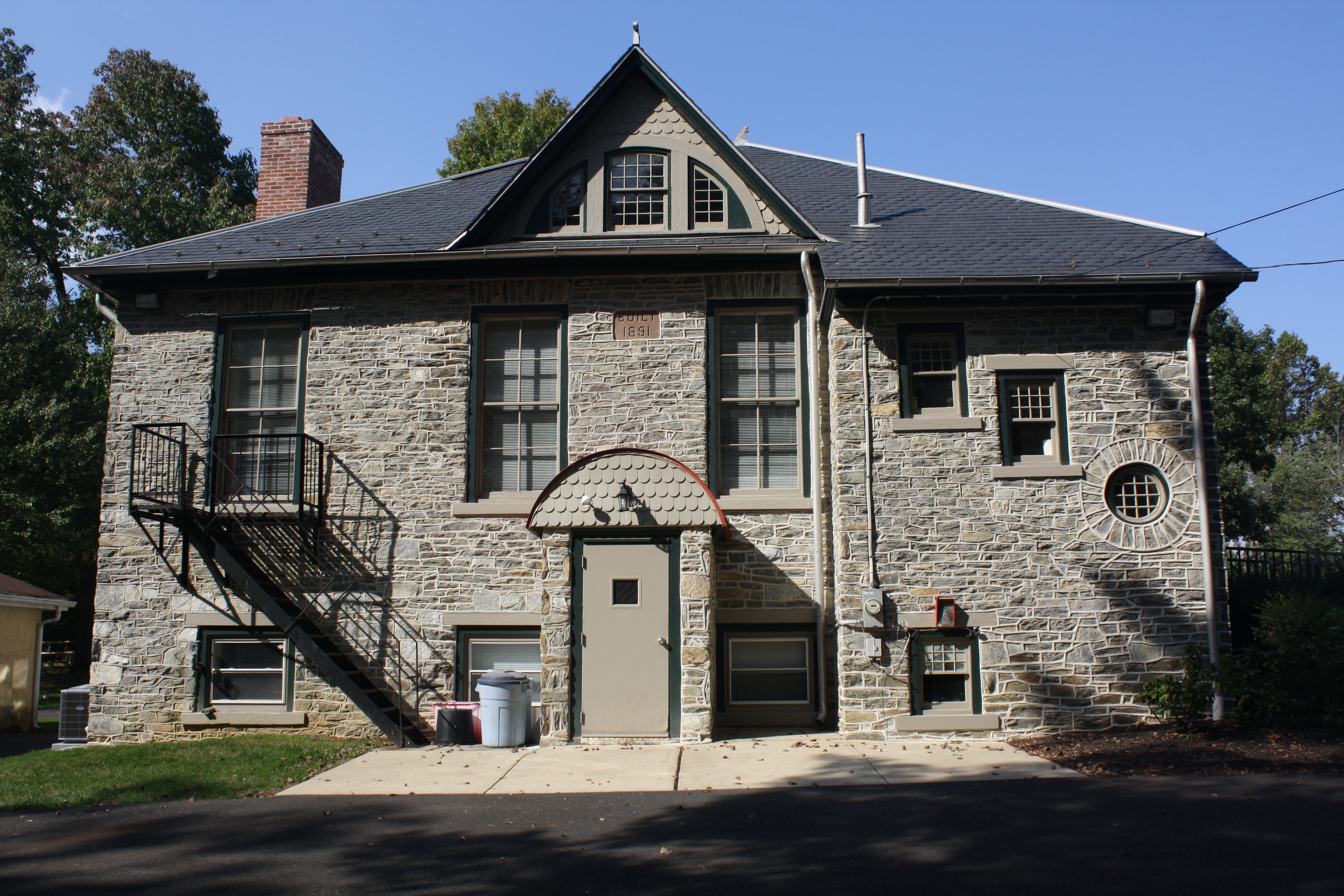
- Langhorne Manor Borough Hall, October 2012

- Location within Pennsylvania Location within the United States
- Location: 618 Hulmeville Ave., Langhorne Manor, Pennsylvania
- Coordinates: 40°9′52″N 74°55′16″W
- Area: less than one acre
- Built: 1891
- Architectural style: Late Victorian, Queen Anne
- MPS: Educational Resources of Pennsylvania MPS
- NRHP reference No.: 08000518
- Added to NRHP: June 10, 2008

The Langhorne Manor School, now known as Langhorne Manor Borough Hall, is an historic one-room school building in Langhorne Manor, Bucks County, Pennsylvania, United States.

It was added to the National Register of Historic Places in 2008.

== History and architectural features ==
Built in 1891, this historic structure is a small 1 1/2-story building with stone-faced, wood-frame walls and a slate covered hipped roof. Designed in the Queen Anne style, it measures thirty-three feet wide by forty-three feet deep. The roof features two eyelid dormers and a gable dormer with fishscale shingles. The school was converted to a borough hall in 1959.
