= Brandon Bing =

American football player (born 1989)

No. 45, 41
- Position: Cornerback

Personal information
- Born: August 8, 1989 (age 37); Philadelphia, Pennsylvania, U.S.
- Listed height: 5 ft 11 in (1.80 m)
- Listed weight: 177 lb (80 kg)

Career information
- College: Rutgers
- NFL draft: 2011: undrafted

Career history
- Denver Broncos (2011)*; Buffalo Bills (2011)*; New York Giants (2011–2012)*
- * Offseason or practice squad member only

Awards and highlights
- Super Bowl champion (XLVI)
- Stats at Pro Football Reference

Brandon Bing (born August 8, 1989) is an American former professional football player who was a cornerback in the National Football League (NFL). He played college football for the Rutgers Scarlet Knights. Bing was signed by the Denver Broncos as an undrafted free agent in 2011. In addition to playing with the Broncos, he also played for the Buffalo Bills and the New York Giants.

== Early life ==
Bing attended Cheltenham High School, where he received a track scholarship, and walked on to the football team.

== Professional football career ==
Pre-draft measurables
Height	Weight	40-yard dash	10-yard split	20-yard split	20-yard shuttle	Three-cone drill	Vertical jump	Broad jump	Bench press
5 ft 11 in (1.80 m)	181 lb (82 kg)	4.28 s	1.51 s	2.54 s	4.28 s	6.90 s	38 1/2 in (0.98 m)	11 ft 3 in (3.43 m)	18 reps
All values from NFL Combine

Bing, coming out of Rutgers University & Cheltenham High School, won his first NFL Super Bowl in 2012, after defeating the New England Patriots. He is featured on the YouTube program Whistle: No Days Off. Season 3 episode 6.
