= Hulmeville, Pennsylvania =

Borough in Pennsylvania, US

- Borough
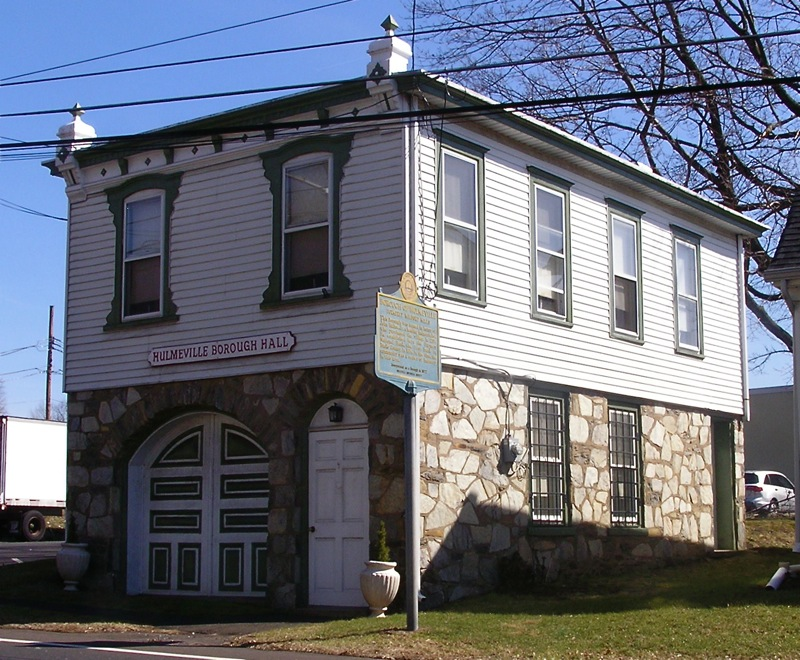
- Borough hall in Hulmeville

- Seal

- Location in Bucks County, Pennsylvania

- Location in Pennsylvania Location in the United States
- Coordinates: 40°08′36″N 74°54′26″W
- Country: United States
- State: Pennsylvania
- County: Bucks

Government
  - Mayor: Debbie Mahon

Area
  - Total: 0.37 sq mi (0.97 km^{2})
  - Land: 0.36 sq mi (0.92 km^{2})
  - Water: 0.015 sq mi (0.04 km^{2})
- Elevation: 46 ft (14 m)

Population (2020)
  - Total: 982
  - Density: 2,758.6/sq mi (1,065.09/km^{2})
- Time zone: UTC-5 (Eastern (EST))
  - Summer (DST): UTC-4 (EDT)
- ZIP Code: 19047
- Area codes: 215, 267 and 445
- FIPS code: 42-36192
- Website: hulmeville-pa.gov

Hulmeville is a borough in Bucks County, Pennsylvania, United States. As of the 2020 census, Hulmeville had a population of 982.

== History ==
The Hulme family name, originally DeHoulme, is of Norman origin, dating from William the Conqueror. Members of the family originally settled in Lancashire, England, a branch later moved to Cheshire. The American family came from this branch. George Hulme Sr. and George Hulme Jr. immigrated to Bucks County from Tilston, Cheshire, about 1700, purchasing land and settled in Middletown Township, some of the family later relocating to Buckingham. John Hulme Sr., grandson of George Sr. and his son, George Hulme Jr., moved from Buckingham to Fallsington and ran a weaving business until 1796 when John Jr. purchased land along the Neshaminy Creek and called it Milford. John Jr. married Rebecca Milnor daughter of William Milnor.

Within a few years, the village built up to a number of dwellings, mills and other shops. The five sons of John Jr. became a miller, two storekeepers, a tanner and a farmer. There was no public house, but John Jr. many times opened his house to travelers. One autumn day in 1809, Josiah Quincy III stayed overnight on the way from Boston to Washington, D.C. John Jr. served a term in the Pennsylvania General Assembly and helped start a post office at Milford established on 1 October 1809, his son Isaac, the first postmaster. The village name then changed to Hulmeville. It is claimed that the General Assembly changed the name in honor of John Jr.

The first bank in Bucks County was organized in 1814, John Jr. the first president. The bank moved to Bristol in 1830 and its name was changed to Farmers' National Bank.

The Hulmeville Historic District was added to the National Register of Historic Places in 1986.

== Geography ==
Hulmeville is located at 40°8′36″N 74°54′26″W (40.143259, -74.907118). According to the U.S. Census Bureau, the borough has a total area of 0.4 square miles (1.0 km^{2}), all land.

Neshaminy Creek passes through Hulmeville.

== Demographics ==
Historical population
Census	Pop.	Note	%±
1880	376		—
1890	418		11.2%
1900	454		8.6%
1910	468		3.1%
1920	491		4.9%
1930	582		18.5%
1940	694		19.2%
1950	860		23.9%
1960	968		12.6%
1970	906		−6.4%
1980	1,014		11.9%
1990	916		−9.7%
2000	893		−2.5%
2010	1,003		12.3%
2020	982		−2.1%

As of the 2010 census, the borough was 93.5% Non-Hispanic White, 0.7% Black or African American, 3.0% Asian, and 2.4% were two or more races. 1.0% of the population were of Hispanic or Latino ancestry.

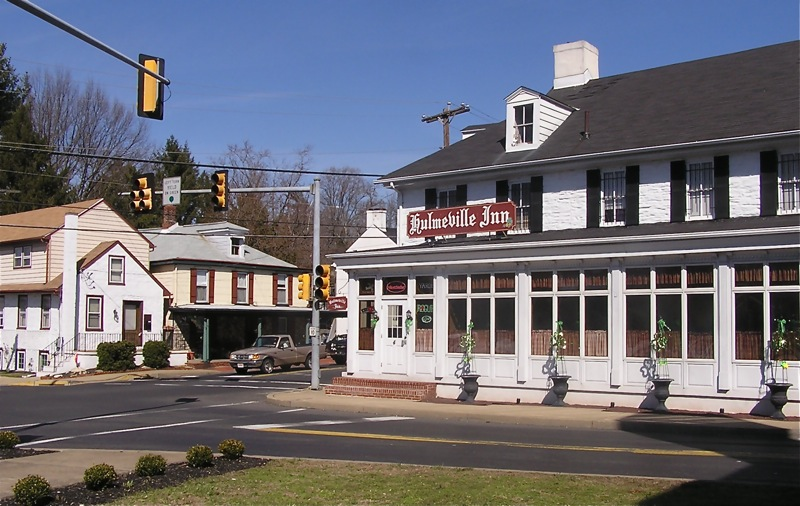
Downtown Hulmeville

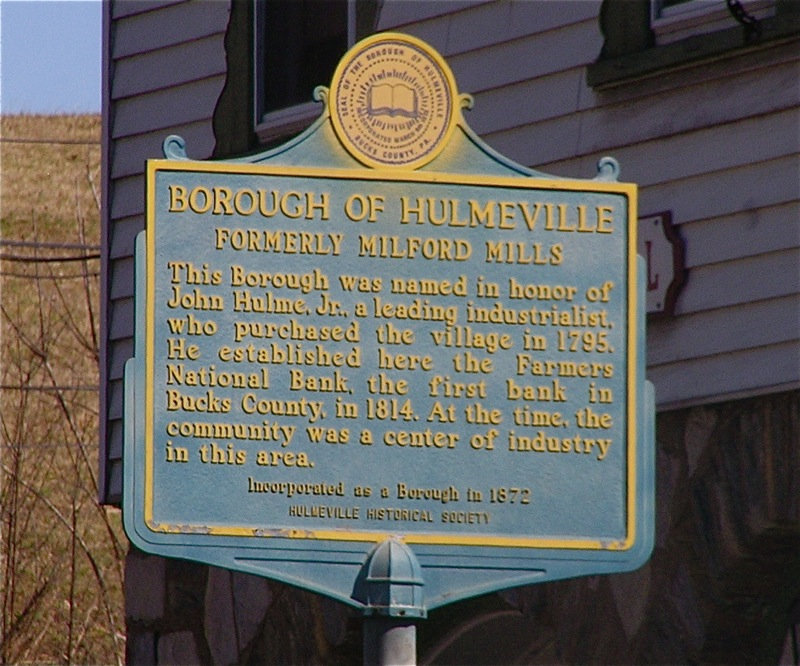
Historical marker in Hulmeville

As of the census of 2000, there were 893 people, 339 households, and 233 families residing in the borough. The population density was 2,319.3 inhabitants per square mile (895.5/km^{2}). There were 356 housing units at an average density of 924.6 per square mile (357.0/km^{2}). The racial makeup of the borough was 97.42% White, 0.34% African American, 0.45% Native American, 1.01% Asian, 0.11% from other races, and 0.67% from two or more races. Hispanic or Latino of any race were 0.45% of the population.

There were 339 households, out of which 30.4% had children under the age of 18 living with them, 57.2% were married couples living together, 9.4% had a female householder with no husband present, and 31.0% were non-families. 23.0% of all households were made up of individuals, and 6.2% had someone living alone who was 65 years of age or older. The average household size was 2.63 and the average family size was 3.17.

In the borough the population was spread out, with 23.7% under the age of 18, 6.6% from 18 to 24, 35.1% from 25 to 44, 22.8% from 45 to 64, and 11.8% who were 65 years of age or older. The median age was 35 years. For every 100 females there were 99.3 males. For every 100 females age 18 and over, there were 103.9 males.

The median income for a household in the borough was $55,259, and the median income for a family was $59,000. Males had a median income of $42,321 versus $31,923 for females. The per capita income for the borough was $24,153. About 0.8% of families and 1.8% of the population were below the poverty line, including 1.4% of those under age 18 and none of those age 65 or over.

== Education ==
Hulmeville lies within the Neshaminy School District. Students attend Herbert Hoover Elementary School for grades K-4, Maple Point Middle School for grades 5-8, and Neshaminy High School for grades 9-12.

== Transportation ==
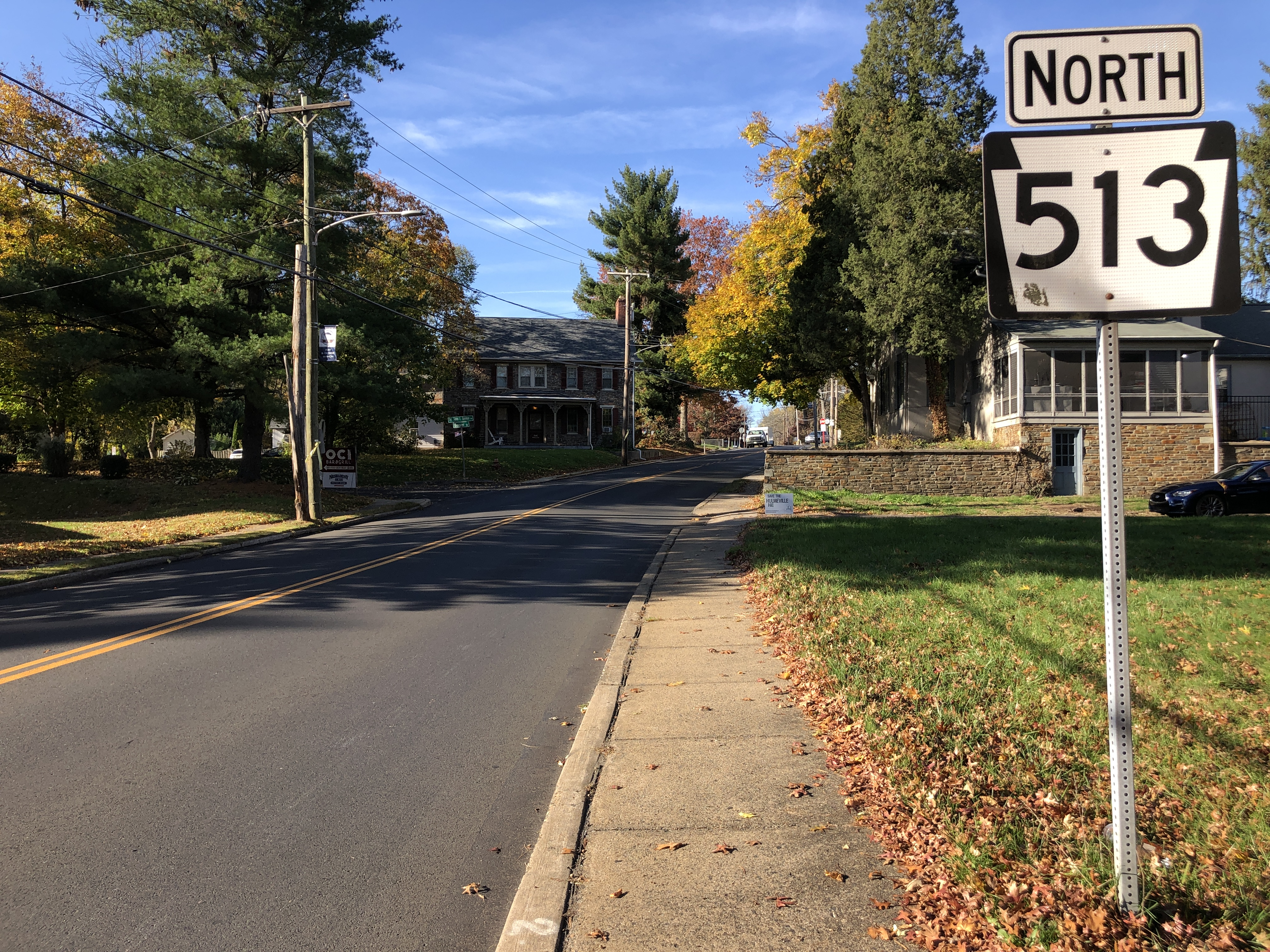
PA 513 northbound in Hulmeville

As of 2013 there were 4.20 miles (6.76 km) of public roads in Hulmeville, of which 2.04 miles (3.28 km) were maintained by the Pennsylvania Department of Transportation (PennDOT) and 2.16 miles (3.48 km) were maintained by the borough.

Pennsylvania Route 513 is the only numbered highway traversing Hulmeville. It follows a north-south alignment via Hulmeville Road and Bellevue Avenue across the western portion of the borough.

SEPTA provides Suburban Bus service to Hulmeville along Route 130, which runs between Frankford Avenue and Knights Road in Northeast Philadelphia and Bucks County Community College in Newtown.

== Climate ==
According to the Köppen climate classification system, Hulmeville has a Humid subtropical climate (Cfa). Cfa climates are characterized by all months having an average mean temperature > 32.0 °F (0.0 °C), at least four months with an average mean temperature ≥ 50.0 °F (10.0 °C), at least one month with an average mean temperature ≥ 71.6 °F (22.0 °C) and no significant precipitation difference between seasons. Although most summer days are slightly humid in Hulmeville, episodes of heat and high humidity can occur with heat index values > 92 °F (33 °C). Since 1981, the highest air temperature was 102.9 °F (39.4 °C) on July 22, 2011, and the highest daily average mean dew point was 75.4 °F (24.1 °C) on August 13, 2016. The average wettest month is July, which corresponds with the annual peak in thunderstorm activity. Since 1981, the wettest calendar day was 6.63 inches (168 mm) on August 27, 2011. During the winter months, the average annual extreme minimum air temperature is 1.8 °F (−16.8 °C). Since 1981, the coldest air temperature was −9.4 °F (−23.0 °C) on January 22, 1984. Episodes of extreme cold and wind can occur, with wind chill values < −8 °F (−22 °C). The average annual snowfall (Nov-Apr) is between 24 inches (61 cm) and 30 inches (76 cm). Ice storms and large snowstorms depositing ≥ 12 inches (30 cm) occur once every few years, particularly during nor’easters from December through February.

Climate data for Hulmeville, Elevation 59 ft (18 m), 1981-2010 normals, extremes 1981-2018
Month	Jan	Feb	Mar	Apr	May	Jun	Jul	Aug	Sep	Oct	Nov	Dec	Year
Record high °F (°C)	71.7 (22.1)	78.0 (25.6)	87.6 (30.9)	94.8 (34.9)	95.8 (35.4)	96.9 (36.1)	102.9 (39.4)	100.8 (38.2)	98.7 (37.1)	88.7 (31.5)	81.5 (27.5)	76.2 (24.6)	102.9 (39.4)
Mean daily maximum °F (°C)	40.5 (4.7)	43.7 (6.5)	51.9 (11.1)	63.8 (17.7)	73.3 (22.9)	82.5 (28.1)	86.6 (30.3)	85.0 (29.4)	78.2 (25.7)	66.9 (19.4)	56.0 (13.3)	44.9 (7.2)	64.5 (18.1)
Daily mean °F (°C)	32.3 (0.2)	34.8 (1.6)	42.1 (5.6)	52.8 (11.6)	62.1 (16.7)	71.7 (22.1)	76.3 (24.6)	74.8 (23.8)	67.7 (19.8)	56.1 (13.4)	46.5 (8.1)	36.7 (2.6)	54.6 (12.6)
Mean daily minimum °F (°C)	24.0 (−4.4)	25.9 (−3.4)	32.4 (0.2)	41.8 (5.4)	50.9 (10.5)	60.8 (16.0)	65.9 (18.8)	64.5 (18.1)	57.1 (13.9)	45.4 (7.4)	37.0 (2.8)	28.5 (−1.9)	44.6 (7.0)
Record low °F (°C)	−9.4 (−23.0)	−2.3 (−19.1)	4.4 (−15.3)	18.0 (−7.8)	33.4 (0.8)	42.4 (5.8)	48.5 (9.2)	43.3 (6.3)	36.7 (2.6)	25.6 (−3.6)	12.7 (−10.7)	0.3 (−17.6)	−9.4 (−23.0)
Average precipitation inches (mm)	3.56 (90)	2.73 (69)	4.23 (107)	3.89 (99)	4.26 (108)	4.25 (108)	5.07 (129)	4.33 (110)	4.19 (106)	3.74 (95)	3.49 (89)	3.97 (101)	47.71 (1,212)
Average relative humidity (%)	65.4	62.0	57.8	57.3	61.9	65.4	66.0	68.2	69.1	68.6	66.9	67.1	64.7
Average dew point °F (°C)	22.0 (−5.6)	23.1 (−4.9)	28.3 (−2.1)	38.1 (3.4)	48.9 (9.4)	59.5 (15.3)	64.1 (17.8)	63.6 (17.6)	57.2 (14.0)	45.9 (7.7)	36.1 (2.3)	26.8 (−2.9)	42.9 (6.1)
Source: PRISM

== Ecology ==
According to the A. W. Kuchler U.S. potential natural vegetation types, Hulmeville would have a dominant vegetation type of Appalachian Oak (104) with a dominant vegetation form of Eastern Hardwood Forest (25). The plant hardiness zone is 7a with an average annual extreme minimum air temperature of 1.8 °F (−16.8 °C). The spring bloom typically begins by April 7 and fall color usually peaks by November 4.
