= Neshaminy High School =

Public school in Pennsylvania, US

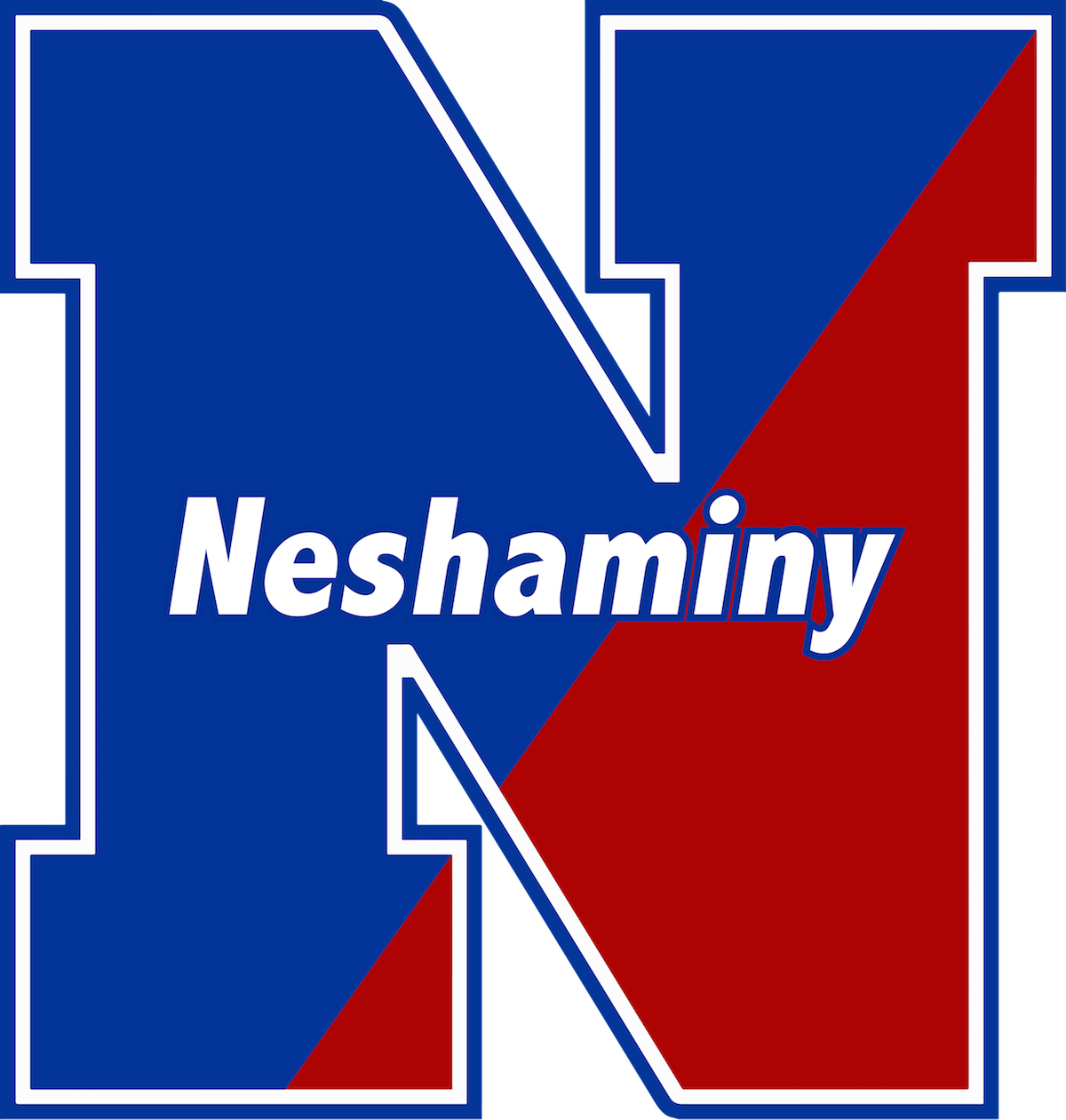

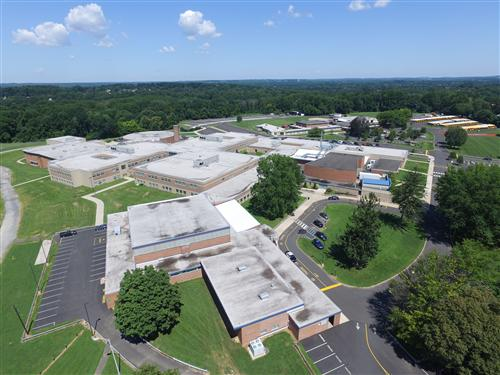

Location
- 2001 Old Lincoln Highway; Langhorne, Pennsylvania postal address, (Bucks County) 19047-3240; United States; 40.1567°N 74.9450°W

Information
- Former name: Neshaminy-Langhorne High School
- School type: Public high school
- Motto: Latin: Non Sibi Sed Scholae
- Established: 1953
- School district: Neshaminy School District
- NCES District ID: 4216410
- Superintendent: Jason Bowman
- School code: PA-122097502-6455
- CEEB code: 392145
- NCES School ID: 421641006455
- Principal: Steve Garstka
- Teaching staff: 166.00 (on an FTE basis)
- Grades: 9–12
- Enrollment: 2,919 (2023–2024)
- Student to teacher ratio: 17.58
- Colors: Red & blue
- Athletics conference: Pennsylvania Interscholastic Athletic Association
- Mascot: Redskin
- Nickname: Skins
- Rival: Pennsbury High School
- Accreditation: MSA
- Newspaper: The Playwickian
- Yearbook: The Redskin
- Website: nhs.neshaminy.org

Neshaminy High School is a public high school in Middletown Township (Langhorne post office address) in Bucks County, Pennsylvania, United States. It is the only high school in the Neshaminy School District, serving students in Middletown Township, Lower Southampton Township, Hulmeville, Langhorne, Langhorne Manor, and Penndel. In 2022, the school enrolled 2,677 students in grades 9 through 12. U.S. News & World Report ranked the school 117 out of 718 Pennsylvania high schools in 2022.

== History ==
=== 20th century ===
In 1922, Langhorne Borough and Middletown Township signed an agreement to create Langhorne-Middletown High School at the corner of Cherry Street and Maple Avenue. By 1946, Langhorne Manor, Penndel, Hulmeville, and Lower Southampton agreed to participate in the expansion of Langhorne-Middletown High School. However, their plan changed when William J. Levitt announced his plan to establish Levittown, one of America's first planned communities, partially located in Middletown Township. The creation of Levittown and other new housing developments led the district to need a new high school. Neshaminy High School opened in 1953, covering grades 7 through 12.

Before the 1950s, most of lower Bucks County, Pennsylvania, was rural farmland.

In the early 1970s, the population rose to 3,500. As the district continued its rapid expansion in the 1960s, Neshaminy High School underwent multiple expansions. However, the community eventually decided that it needed a second high school.

In 1975, Neshaminy-Maple Point High School opened in the district's northern end; the existing Neshaminy High School became Neshaminy-Langhorne High School. Shortly after its opening, the community experienced a rapid population decline, leading to the closure of Neshaminy-Maple Point only eight years later. Once again, the entire district attended a single Neshaminy Senior High School for grades 10 through 12. The name of Neshaminy High had reverted from Neshaminy-Langhorne High School. The former Neshaminy-Maple Point High School reopened in 1993 as Maple Point Middle School and included grade 9.

=== 21st century ===
In 2003, the Neshaminy School Board proposed demolishing the current school building and constructing a new facility on the same school grounds. This plan was priced at $100 million and required an $85 million tax-funded bond. In April 2004, residents voted against the new building referendum due to its cost.

As an alternative plan, the school board decided to demolish sections of the school and rebuild them as the school year proceeded. This major renovation project was estimated to cost $72 million and would replace 95% of classroom facilities. Because renovations were completed as recently as 1995, the existing auditorium, gym, cafeteria, and library were not replaced. When construction finished in September 2009, the school welcomed ninth graders back for the first time in three decades.

== Campus ==
Neshaminy High School consists of a main building with a central hallway and departmental branching hallways. There are two gymnasiums, Gym One and Gym Three. The school also has two theaters. The larger Theodore Kloos Auditorium, in front of the main building, is used by the school's music department for the annual musical and by outside groups for performances. The school's drama department uses the smaller black-box theater.

As of 1982, its capacity was 2,500.

== Academics ==
In the 2020–2021 school year, 25% of students were proficient in the English keystones, 76.7% in the algebra keystones, and 85.3% in the biology keystones. These scores may be lower than in previous years due to the impacts of the COVID-19 pandemic. The school's average graduation rate was 93%.

In 2015–2016, Neshaminy students took Advanced Placement (A.P.) exams in eighteen areas. In 2020, Neshaminy students' average SAT score was 1190 (600 math, 590 verbal). The average ACT score was 27.

== Extracurricular activities ==
Neshaminy High School offers dozens of co-curricular activities, including Action Adventure Club, Anime Club, Art Studio, Book Club, Ceramics Club, Change It Up Club, Color Guard, Concert Choir, dance team, debate team, Diversity Pride Club, dramatics, Environmental Action Club, Friends Helping Friends, Future Business Leaders of America, Future Problem Solvers, Interact, jazz band and ensemble, marching band, MiniTHON, Nature Club, National Honor Society, photography, Play with Clay, Reading Olympics, Rock Band, select choir, Spectrum, and World Language Club.

=== Gym Night ===
Neshaminy High School held its first Gym Night in the 1953–1954 school year. Since then, Gym Night has grown into a community-wide annual event. For the event, the student body divides into the Blue (last names A-K) and Red (last names L-Z) teams. For two nights in late winter, the two teams compete in relays and dance exhibitions designed and choreographed by the student. One team is crowned champion based on choreography, decorations, relay performance, and sportsmanship.

=== Student publications ===
The school's student newspaper is The Playwickian. It has received awards from Columbia University for outstanding performance. On April 2, 2014, students Jackson Haines and Emily Scott received awards from the 2014 Scholastic Keystone Press Awards contest from articles published in The Playwickian about the school's mascot. Haines also receive a Gold Circle Award from the Columbia Scholastic Press Association for the same article. In July, the Pennsylvania High School Press Association awarded Journalism Teacher of the Year to Tara Huber, the adviser for The Playwickian.

Originally named Expressions Literary Magazine, the school's Howler literary magazine has received the Pennsylvania School Press Association award. In addition, the school's yearbook is called The Redskin.

== Athletics ==
Neshaminy High School's athletic teams compete in fall, winter, and spring sports at the ninth-grade, junior varsity, and varsity levels. The school is a member of the Pennsylvania Interscholastic Athletic Association (PIAA) Suburban One League. Fall sports include cheerleading, boys and girls cross country, field hockey, football, golf, boys and girls soccer, girls tennis, and girls volleyball. Winter sports include boys and girls basketball, boys and girls bowling, cheerleading, boys and girls indoor track, boys and girls swimming, and wrestling. Spring sports include baseball, boys and girls lacrosse, softball, boys tennis, boys and girls track, and boys volleyball.

=== Mascot ===
Neshaminy High School athletic teams are known as the Skins. The prior mascot was the Redskins. In 2012, a Neshaminy parent of Native American descent started a campaign to change the name because of its racially offensive and harmful nature. This parent spoke at numerous board meetings, though Neshaminy made no progress toward a change. As a result, a complaint was filed with the Pennsylvania Human Relations Commission (PHRC) in 2013. After a thorough investigation, the PHRC ruled against the Neshaminy School District, requiring the school to change its mascot. However, the school administration appealed PHRC's ruling.

On October 23, 2013, the student editorial board of the high school's newspaper, The Playwickian, stated its intention to no longer call the team "Redskin" in its publications. The school administration responded that the student editorial board lacked the power to make this decision. In 2014, newspaper staff members received awards from the Scholastic Keystone Press Awards contest and the Gold Circle Award from the Columbia Scholastic Press Association for articles published in "The Playwickian" on the issue.

In May 2014, a student submitted an opinion editorial that contained the term "Redskin". The school's Principal McGee demanded that The Playwickian run the piece and threatened to withdraw the newspaper's final issue if its staff did not comply. The Playwickian ran its last issue of the year without the article. The principal confiscated the newspaper, calling for an emergency meeting with its co-editors and restricting access to The Playwickian's social media and website. Later, McGee defend his actions in a statement on the school's website. On June 26, 2014, the Neshaminy School Board gave The Playwickian authority to ban the term in articles, but required the paper to publish editorials and letters to the editor with the term present and unedited.

In 2015, the PHRC made a preliminary finding that the name Redskins is "racially derogatory" and creates a "hostile educational environment." The case then proceeded to a full committee hearing. After six years of controversy, the PHRC held a hearing in January 2019. In November 2019, the PHRC ruled that Neshaminy High School could continue to use the name but must cease using any imagery promoting negative stereotypes of Native Americans. In addition, PHRC required the school to teach its students about Native American history to prevent the use of stereotypes. Neshaminy School District spent over $400,000 in legal fees in its campaign to retain the Redskin nickname.

=== Championships ===
The school has won several PIAA state athletic championships.

Neshaminy Sports PIAA State Championships
Sport	Season	Reference
Girls Soccer	2013	
Softball	2003	
Football	2001	
Wrestling	1999, 2000	
Boys Soccer	1982, 1984, 1994	
Field Hockey	1983, 1990	
Boys Gymnastics	1986, 1988	

=== Soccer ===
The soccer program has four state championship titles. The boys' program won PIAA State Championships in 1982, 1984, and 1994. The girls' program won the title in 2013.

=== Football ===
The 1950 season was the school's first year as Neshaminy High School.

The first Neshaminy football team was assembled in 1950. Under Head Coach James Egli, the football team scored 133 total points that year. The team became a traditional powerhouse under head coach Harry E. Franks from 1952 through 1959, compiling a 69–10–2 record and scoring 2,203 points while allowing 857. The football team had undefeated seasons in 1954 and 1956.

John Petercuskie took over the head coaching position from 1960 through 1965, leading the team to a 59–1–5 record and ad 26 shutout victories. Under Petercuskie, the football team scored 1,925 points and allowed 410 points; the team was undefeated between 1960 and 1965, except in 1961, with a 51-game winning streak starting in 1961 and lasting until 1965.

Jack Swartz coached the team from 1968 through 1972, compiling a 43–11–1 record. The 1971 team had an 11–0 perfect record and is regarded as one of the best in Pennsylvania history. PFN rated this Pennsylvania's team of the century in 2004. In 1988, coach John Chaump took a team with an 11–0 regular season record to the semi-finals of the first-ever Pennsylvania state playoffs (statewide).

Beginning in 1995, head coach Mark Schmidt continued the winning tradition with a state playoff record of 16–6, three conference championships (2001, 2005, and 2008), two conference co-championships (2002, 2004), seven state playoff appearances (2001, 2002, 2004, 2005, 2007, 2008, and 2009), and one Pennsylvania state championship (2001). In addition, the 2001 football team compiled a perfect 15–0 overall record with running back Jamar Brittingham carrying the ball for 2,575 yards (2,355 m) in fourteen games.

Season	Record	Coach	Neshaminy Football Championships	Source
2018	5–1, 8–4	Steve Wilmot	Suburban One League National Conference co-champions	
2017	6–0, 10–2	Steve Wilmot	Suburban One League National Conference	
2016	6–0, 11–1	Steve Wilmot	Suburban One League National Conference	
2013	6–1, 13–2	Mark Schmidt	PIAA Class AAAA District One	
2008	7–0, 12–2	Mark Schmidt	Suburban One League National Conference	
2005	7–0, 10–2	Mark Schmidt	Suburban One League National Conference	
2004	6–1, 13–2	Mark Schmidt	Suburban One League National Conference tri-champions, PIAA Class AAAA District One, PIAA Class AAAA Eastern Pennsylvania	
2002	3–1, 8–3	Mark Schmidt	Suburban One League National Conference Patriot Division	
2001	5–0, 15–0	Mark Schmidt	Suburban One League National Conference Patriot Division, PIAA Class AAAA District One, PIAA Class AAAA Eastern Pennsylvania, PIAA Class AAAA Pennsylvania State	
1988 (Note: PIAA state playoffs began in 1988)	5–0, 11–1	John Chaump	Suburban One League National Conference Patriot Division, PIAA Class AAAA District One	
1987	4–1, 9–2	John Chaump	Suburban One League National Conference Patriot Division (Tri-champions)	
1986	4–1, 8–3	Dick Bedesem	Suburban One League National Conference Patriot Division (Co-champions)	
1975	4–1, 7–4	Paris Allison	Lower Bucks County League Section One (Co-champions)	
1971	4–0, 6–0, 11–0	Jack Swartz	Lower Bucks County League Section One, Big Seven Conference	
1970	3–0–1, 9–1–1	Jack Swartz	Lower Bucks County League Section One	
1969	4–2, 7–4	Jack Swartz	Big Seven Conference (Tri-champions)	
1965	3–0, 3–0–1, 10–0–1	John Petercuskie	Lower Bucks County League Section One, Big Six Conference	
1964	3–0, 3–0–1, 9–0–1	John Petercuskie	Lower Bucks County League Section One, East Penn Conference (Co-champions)	
1963	3–0, 4–0, 9–0–1	John Petercuskie	Lower Bucks County League Section One, East Penn Conference	
1962	3–0, 10–0–1	John Petercuskie	Lower Bucks County League Section One	
1961	3–0, 11–1	John Petercuskie	Lower Bucks County League Section One	
1960	8–0, 10–0–1	John Petercuskie	Lower Bucks County League	
1959	8–0, 10–1	Harry Franks	Lower Bucks County League	
1958	6–0–1, 8–1–1	Harry Franks	Lower Bucks County League (Co-champions)	
1957	6–1, 7–3	Harry Franks	Lower Bucks County League (Co-champions)	
1956	6–0–1, 9–0–1	Harry Franks	Lower Bucks County League	
1955	7–0, 7–3	Harry Franks	Lower Bucks County League	
1954	7–0, 10–0	Harry Franks	Lower Bucks County League	
1953	6–1, 9–1	Harry Franks	Lower Bucks County League (Co-champions)	
1952	6–0, 9–1	Harry Franks	Lower Bucks County League	
1947	3–0, 7–2–1	Mike DeRisi	Lower Bucks County League	
1946	2–0, 7–2–1	Mike DeRisi	Lower Bucks County League	

Neshaminy Football Massey Computer End of Season Ratings Public Schools, All Classes
Season	Coach	Record	Bucks County Rating (Note: Bucks County ratings out of sixteen teams)	District-1 Rating (Note: District-1 ratings out of 67 teams)	Pennsylvania Rating (Note: Pennsylvania ratings out of 502 teams)	Source
2018	Steve Wilmot	8–4	2	8	39	
2017	Steve Wilmot	10–2	3	6	39	
2016	Steve Wilmot	11–1	1	6	29	
2015	Steve Wilmot	9–4	2	7	26	
2014	Mike Frederick	4–6	4	16	112	
2013	Mark Schmidt	13–2	1	1	3	
2012	Mark Schmidt	9–4	4	9	42	
2011	Mark Schmidt	8–4	3	6	26	
2010	Mark Schmidt	12–2	1	2	11	
2009	Mark Schmidt	9–3	1	8	38	
2008	Mark Schmidt	12–2	1	2	21	
2007	Mark Schmidt	11–2	1	3	19	
2006	Mark Schmidt	6–4	4	8	55	
2005	Mark Schmidt	10–2	1	3	18	
2004	Mark Schmidt	13–2	1	1	5	
2003	Mark Schmidt	3–7	6	18	126	
2002	Mark Schmidt	8–3	1	7	49	
2001	Mark Schmidt	15–0	1	1	1	

== Notable alumni ==
Name	Year	Profession	Notability	Reference
Ryan Arcidiacono	2012	Basketball Player	Guard for the New York Knicks, played college basketball for the Villanova Wildcats	
Chris Bahr	1971	Football Player & Soccer Player	Former NFL kicker	
Matt Bahr	1974	Football Player & Soccer Player	Former NFL kicker	
Len Barker	1973	Baseball Player	Former MLB All-Star pitcher	
Anthony Fedorov	2003	Singer	Former lead singer for 7th Heaven, American Idol contestant	
James Franklin	1991	Football Coach	Head Coach for the Virginia Tech Hokies	
Mike Frederick	1991	Football Player	Former NFL Defensive End	
Bob Grupp	1973	Football Player	Former Punter for the Kansas City Chiefs	
Kevin Kelly	2005	Football Player	Former Punter for the Harrisburg Stampede, played college football for the Penn State Nittany Lions	
Christopher J. King	1994	Politician	Member of the Pennsylvania House of Representatives, District 142	
Steven Kunes	1974	American Screenwriter	American Screenwriter and member of the Writers Guild of America West	
Steve Shull	1976	Football Player	Former linebacker for the Miami Dolphins	
Harry Schuh	1962	Football Player	Former NFL Offensive Tackle	
Claire Smith	1973	Sportswriter	Subject of A League of Her Own, former New York Yankees beat writer	
Steven de Souza	1965	American Screenwriter	Action film director and screenwriter	
Daniel Styer	1973	Scientist	theoretical physicist and distinguished professor of physics at Oberlin College	
Shea Tierney	2005	Football Coach	Quarterbacks Coach for the New York Giants	
Angela Trimbur	1999	Actor	actress, writer, dancer, choreographer, and former reality television participant	
Catie Turner	2018	Singer	Singer who competed on American Idol	
Chris Vincent	2002	Football Player	Former NFL running back	

== Notable faculty ==
- Dick Bedesem, football player and coach
- Mike Frederick, professional football player
- John Petercuskie, football player and coach
- Joe Plumeri, chair & CEO of Willis Group Holdings, owner of the Trenton Thunder; taught history and coached football from 1966 to 1968
