= Suburban One League =

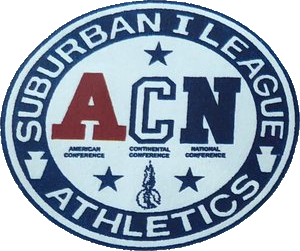
- Formerly: Suburban League
- Conference: Pennsylvania Interscholastic Athletic Association (PIAA District 1)
- Founded: 1922
- Sports fielded: 26; men's: 15; women's: 11
- Subdivision: American Conference; Continental Conference; National Conference
- No. of teams: 24
- Headquarters: Pennsylvania
- Region: Montgomery County (12 Schools) and Bucks County (12 Schools)
- Website: SOL Website

Suburban One League, often abbreviated "SOL" is an athletic conference in Southeastern Pennsylvania, serving high schools in Montgomery County and Bucks County. The league was established in 1922 as the "Suburban League." Since its inception, SOL has produced many district, state, and even some national championships. It has also produced some great athletes, including Baseball Hall of Fame member Reggie Jackson.

== History ==
=== Early years to World War II ===
Today's Suburban One League is a direct descendant of the Philadelphia Suburban High School Athletic Association, or Suburban League as it became popularly known. The first sport in which the Suburban League competed was basketball in 1922–23. Eleven schools, eight from Delaware County and three from Montgomery County, comprised the league that first season. One of those schools, Abington, remain members of the Suburban One League to this day. Media High School, which closed in 1966, was the league's first basketball champion. The other participating schools in that first season were Chester, Darby, Lansdowne, Lower Merion, Radnor, Ridley Park, Swarthmore and Upper Darby. Early-season standings from that first season, located on page 5 of the January 11, 1923 edition of The Chester Times, confirm that these were the only 11 schools in the basketball league in 1922–23.

In the spring of 1923, baseball and track schedules were played; Cheltenham, another school still in the Suburban One League, made its league debut in the 1923 baseball season. In the fall of 1923, the Suburban League added football, though more than a quarter-century would pass before round-robin schedules were attempted. Almost all of the Suburban League's football champions until after World War II were unofficial, chosen either by a points system or by vote of newspapermen who covered the schools.

Already, in the second year of its existence, the Suburban League split into Section A and Section B, divided approximately by school size. Only in the 1923-24 basketball season did a post-season playoff determine an overall champion. Since then, the league has crowned champions in each section, conference or division without a league-wide playoff. In the 2014–15 season, the Suburban One League held a post-season tournament, in boys and girls basketball only, to determine an overall league champion, though it was in addition to, rather than a substitute for, the conference regular-season titles.

Over time, as more high schools opened in suburban Philadelphia, more schools joined the Suburban League. Chester County had its first representative in 1924; by 1932, six schools from the county were members. Also by 1932, the basketball league had divided into four sections; by 1940, the Suburban League had six sections. In the 1944-45 through 1946–47 seasons, the Suburban League reached its membership peak as 37 schools in six divisions competed in basketball those three school years.

Different newspapers used different shorthand expressions to refer to the separate sections of the league; over time, the most common nomenclature became "Suburban One," "Suburban Two," "Suburban Three" and so on. This abbreviation style is the origin of the current Suburban One League's name, though many years remained until the league would resemble its current format.

=== Post-war growth and contraction ===
Football was slower to get started in the Suburban League. In 1948, after a quarter-century of unofficial league play, four of the largest schools - Abington, Chester, Haverford and Lower Merion - agreed to schedule each other, with the winner of the round-robin competition to receive official recognition as Suburban Section A champion. Abington, Chester and Lower Merion all ended the league season with 2-1 records and were declared tri-champions. Not until 1956 did the league's smaller schools agree to form self-contained sections with round-robin schedules.

The first significant rift in the Philadelphia Suburban High School Athletic Association took place in 1950. With the blessing of the remaining members, eight schools from Chester and Montgomery counties left to form their own independent association known as the Ches-Mont League. At that time, the basketball league shrank from six sections to four; it would further drop to three sections in 1955-56 before returning to four sections in 1959–60. Newly opened high schools were admitted throughout the late 1950s and early 1960s, and by the 1965–66 school year, the Suburban League had almost as many members as its post-World War II peak with 35 competing schools.

State-mandated school district consolidations dropped the league membership to 31 in 1966–67. On May 28, 1966, another bombshell dropped: With no warning, nine schools, most of them along the Main Line, announced they were leaving the Suburban League to start the Central League. Unlike when the Ches-Mont schools left, this move was highly controversial and unpopular; several of the Suburban League schools threatened boycotts. The final season that the future Central League schools were in the Suburban League was uncomfortable.

With the departure of the Central League schools, the Suburban League completed a significant realignment of sections that had begun earlier in the 1960s. For the 1967–68 academic year, every Montgomery County school was moved to Suburban One; the larger Delaware County schools were placed in Suburban Two; and the smaller Delaware County schools competed in Suburban Three. The result was that, over the next decade, the schools in Suburban One acted more independently of their Suburban Two and Suburban Three counterparts, even though, at least in theory, all three sections were still under the same umbrella organization, by then known as the Philadelphia Suburban Schools Athletic Association. Also, in the 1971–72 academic year, the Suburban League expanded to Bucks County for the first time as William Tennent High School joined Suburban One after leaving the Lower Bucks League.

Finally, in the fall of 1978, the growing rift between Suburban One and Suburban Two/Three resulted in the Delaware County schools departing the organization and forming the Del-Val League. All that remained of the once mighty Suburban League were ten schools, its smallest membership to date. Nine of them were in Montgomery County, and one was in Bucks County. The remaining schools retained the Suburban One name, even though the league no longer had a reason to define itself numerically.

=== New expansion and growing pains ===
Even before the departure of the Delaware County schools, Suburban One began to reinvent itself. When the Montgomery County schools were grouped together in 1967, their differing sizes were not a great concern. But by 1977, that was no longer true. In football only, the Suburban One schools divided into a National Conference of the five largest schools and an American Conference of the five smallest. In every other sport, Suburban One remained a single 10-team section (or fewer, depending on the number of schools in a given sport). After Springfield temporarily left in 1980, the league fell to its all-time low of nine members.

With the addition of seven schools, the most at one time in league history to that point, Suburban One grew to 16 schools for 1982. Six of the new members were formerly of the defunct Lower Bucks League; the other was one of the smaller schools in the still thriving Bux-Mont League, attracted by the SOL's two semi-independent conferences based on school size. The National Conference for large schools and the American Conference for smaller schools was instituted in all sports in 1982–83.

Four years later, the formerly shrinking league suddenly found itself with 24 members, the most since 1977. Nine more schools from Bucks and Montgomery counties, seven from the former Bux-Mont League and two from the Bicentennial Athletic League, became members of Suburban One. The league was further subdivided: The 12-team National Conference now had a six-team Patriot Division of, for the most part, the largest six schools, and a six-team Colonial Division. The American Conference was split into the larger Liberty Division and smaller Freedom Division. By its sheer size alone, the Suburban One League had once again become the most important of the various leagues throughout suburban Philadelphia.

The integration of so many new schools with long histories was not without difficulty. The biggest complaint among the newcomers, especially former members of the Bux-Mont League, was the shattering of decades-long traditional rivalries at the altar of alignment by population. Some compromises were made in the early years of the new league; for example, for several years, North Penn, which by its size should have been in the Patriot Division, was allowed to compete in the Colonial Division against several of its old rivals. But by 1992, the rest of the league rebelled against this arrangement, and North Penn was moved into the Patriot Division with schools from the former Lower Bucks League.

Football was especially problematic with the new four-division format. In addition to the round-robin within their own division, each school played three of the six schools in the other division in their conference, which at times led to confusion as to which games counted in the league standings. It also created unbalanced schedules, where one school could have an easier cross-divisional schedule than another school.

=== The "Power 10" and continual realignment ===
After several years of complaints about the football schedule, the Suburban One League changed to three self-contained divisions in 1991. Unlike in other sports, some consideration for competitive balance was considered when deciding on the alignment. But the most significant change was creating a ten-school National Conference for the largest and most competitive schools in the SOL. It did not take long for this conference to become known colloquially as the "Power 10."

Arguably, the "Power 10" was the best high school football conference in Pennsylvania during its 10 years of existence (1991-2000). It was the most decorated, as four times, the champion of the Suburban One National Conference won the PIAA Class AAAA title. All four times, including three years in a row, Central Bucks West was that champion. The Bucks won or shared the "Power 10" crown all 10 years of its existence, but many of its league games were tougher than the playoffs.

The three-divisional format for football ended in 2001.

Meanwhile, the Suburban One League kept the four-division format in most other sports, depending on the number of schools competing. In all sports, the league chose to realign its divisions every two years, concurrent with the PIAA's two-year reclassification of schools. Although it only happened every other year, it still led to confusion.

=== Changing to three divisions ===
From the time it was first implemented in 1986, the two-conference, four-division format was not particularly popular. Finally, in 2004, the Suburban One League ditched it in favor of three quasi-independent conferences. The National Conference name remained for the largest schools; the American Conference was still the home for the SOL's smaller schools. For the schools in the middle, a brand-new Continental Conference was created. With the opening of Central Bucks High School South, the league was now at 25 schools, 24 for football, which made for two conferences of eight schools and one with nine schools. The realignment also brought an end to inter-division crossover games.

But the league still realigned itself every two years, even with the new conference setup.

A rapid increase in travel costs finally brought an end to alignment strictly by student population in 2007. Instead, Suburban One grouped the three conferences by geography and tradition. The National Conference became the home for the schools and their successors that once comprised the Lower Bucks League, with the addition of Abington. The Continental Conference is a rough equivalent of the former Bux-Mont League. The American Conference is similar to the 1970s version of the Suburban One League.

The Suburban One League has kept this alignment intact in almost all sports since 2007, marking the longest period of stability in its history.

For football only, 2014 saw a return to a conference structure based on student population, with all the larger schools in the National, the mid-sized schools in the Continental, and the smaller ones in the American.

Effective in the 2016–2017 academic year, Norristown, one of the schools that competed for the first Suburban League basketball title in the 1922–23 season, and Upper Merion, a Suburban League member since 1933, will leave the Suburban One League for the Pioneer Athletic Conference. At that time, the SOL will have 22 schools, its smallest membership since the 1985–86 school year.

== SOL today ==
The Suburban One League today is a member of District 1, which is a compilation of other public schools in Chester, Montgomery, Bucks, and Delaware counties. In most cases, each school plays only the schools in their conference. However, there are some inter-conference games due to historical rivalries, such as the Abington-Cheltenham rivalry, who play annually on Thanksgiving Day. Founding schools are bolded. The year each school first competed in either the Suburban League or Suburban One League follows the school nickname.

=== Schools Currently in the Suburban One League ===
American Conference	Continental Conference	National Conference
Cheltenham High School (Panthers) 1923	Central Bucks East High School (Patriots) 1986	**Abington Senior High School (Galloping Ghosts)** 1922
**Norristown Area High School (Eagles)** 1922	Central Bucks South High School (Titans) 2004	Bensalem High School (Owls) 1982
Plymouth Whitemarsh High School (Colonials) 1958	Central Bucks West High School (Bucks) 1986	Council Rock High School North (Indians) 2002
Springfield Township High School (Spartans) 1969	Hatboro-Horsham High School (Hatters) 1986	Council Rock High School South (Golden Hawks) 2002
Upper Dublin High School (Cardinals) 1965	North Penn High School (Knights) 1986	Neshaminy High School (Redskins) 1983
Upper Merion Area High School (Vikings) 1933	Pennridge High School (Rams) 1986	Pennsbury High School (Falcons) 1982
Upper Moreland High School (Golden Bears) 1968	Quakertown High School (Panthers) 1986	William Tennent High School (Panthers) 1971
Wissahickon High School (Trojans) 1982	Souderton Area High School (Indians) 1986	Harry S. Truman High School (Tigers) 1982

For football only, the conferences are aligned thusly:

National Conference: Abington, Bensalem, Central Bucks South, Neshaminy, North Penn, Pennridge, Pennsbury, Souderton

Continental Conference: Central Bucks East, Central Bucks West, Council Rock North, Council Rock South, Harry S. Truman, Norristown, Quakertown, William Tennent

American Conference: Cheltenham, Hatboro-Horsham, Plymouth-Whitemarsh, Springfield, Upper Dublin, Upper Merion, Upper Moreland, Wissahickon

=== 22-school league effective in 2016-17 ===
Suburban One League sports in which every school in the league fields a team - football, boys and girls basketball, boys and girls soccer, boys and girls track, golf, field hockey, baseball, softball, boys and girls tennis, and wrestling - will feature the conferences in this alignment starting in the fall of 2016:

American Conference	Continental Conference	National Conference
Cheltenham High School (Panthers) 1923	Central Bucks East High School (Patriots) 1986	**Abington High School (Galloping Ghosts)** 1922
Hatboro-Horsham High School (Hatters) 1986	Central Bucks South High School (Titans) 2004	Bensalem High School (Owls) 1982
Plymouth Whitemarsh High School (Colonials) 1958	Central Bucks West High School (Bucks) 1986	Council Rock High School North (Indians) 2002
Quakertown High School (Panthers) 1986	North Penn High School (Knights) 1986	Council Rock High School South (Golden Hawks) 2002
Springfield Township High School (Spartans) 1969	Pennridge High School (Rams) 1986	Neshaminy High School (Redskins) 1983
Upper Dublin High School (Cardinals) 1965	Souderton Area High School (Indians) 1986	Pennsbury High School (Falcons) 1982
Upper Moreland High School (Golden Bears) 1968	William Tennent High School (Panthers) 1971	Harry S. Truman High School (Tigers) 1982
Wissahickon High School (Trojans) 1982		

== Sports ==
Season	Boys	Girls
Fall	Soccer, Football, Cross Country, Golf, Water Polo	Soccer, Cross Country, Tennis, Field Hockey, Volleyball, Water Polo
Winter	Basketball, Bowling, Swimming, Wrestling, Ice Hockey	Basketball, Swimming, Bowling
Spring	Baseball, Lacrosse, Tennis, Track and Field, Volleyball	Lacrosse, Track and Field, Softball

== Featured Athlete ==
Every week, SOL officials choose one male and female athlete who excelled that week. Each athlete answers several questions, such as favorite athlete, most memorable moment, etc. in addition to an article about the athlete's accomplishments, written by a SOL writer.

== PIAA Champions ==
The following is a list of PIAA state champions from the Suburban One League

School	PIAA Champions
Abington	A Boys Basketball (1974); AAA Girls Cross Country (1985)
Bensalem	AAA Girls Tennis Singles (2001, 2002); AAA Boys Track & Field (2013)
Central Bucks East	AAA Field Hockey (1986, 2002); AAA Boys Tennis Doubles (2001); Girls Golf (2010); AAA Boys Soccer (1991,2015)
Central Bucks West	AAAA Football (1991, 1997, 1998, 1999); AAA Girls Soccer (1993, 1994, 1995, 1996, 2003, 2006, 2008); AAA Girls Cross Country (2005)
Cheltenham	AAAA Girls Basketball (2000, 2007); AAA Boys Track and Field (2014, 2015); AAA Girls Track and Field (2015, 2016)
Council Rock*	AAA Girls Cross Country (1984, 1996); AAA Boys Cross Country (1987, 1988, 1989, 1991, 1992, 1993, 1994, 1995, 1998, 1999); AAA Field Hockey (1994); AAA Boys Golf (1997); AAA Boys Soccer (1985); AAA Girls Soccer (1998, 2001); AAA Softball (1991); AAA Wrestling (1994); AAA Boys Tennis Singles (1996)
Council Rock North	AAA Boys Soccer (2006); AAA Wrestling (2010); Boys Golf (2010); AAA Cross Country (2016)
Council Rock South	AAA Girls Soccer (2004); AAA Wrestling (2004, 2005, 2006, 2008, 2010)
Hatboro-Horsham	AAA Boys Cross Country (1994); AAA Girls Cross Country (2002, 2003); AAAA Softball (2008, 2011) AAA Girls Swimming (2022)
Neshaminy	AAA Field Hockey (1983, 1990); AAAA Football (2001); AAA Boys Soccer (1982,1984,1994); AAA Girls Soccer (2013); AAA Softball (2003); AAA Wrestling (1999, 2000); Boys Gymnastics (1986, 1988)
Norristown	A Boys Basketball (1948); AAA Girls Basketball (1977); AAA Wrestling (1997); A Boys Track & Field (1950, 1951, 1973, 1974); AAA Boys Track & Field (1976)
North Penn	AAAA Football (2003); AAA Boys Tennis Singles (1997, 1999); AAA Wrestling (1987, 1989, 1992, 2002); AAAA Baseball (2009, 2013, 2015); AAA Boys Swimming (1990, 1991, 1992, 1997, 1998, 1999, 2000, 2003, 2004); AAA Girls Swimming (1990); AAA Boys Cross Country (2007, 2008, 2011); AAA Boys Track and Field (2002); AAA Girls Track and Field (1995,1997, 2017); Girls Water Polo (1998, 2006, 2008, 2011, 2015); Boys Water Polo (1996, 2004, 2006, 2007)
Pennridge	AAA Baseball (1987); AAA Boys Tennis Singles (1994, 1995); AAA Wrestling (2005)
Pennsbury	AAA Girls Soccer (1999); AAA Softball (1993, 2001); AAAA Softball (2005); AAA Wrestling (1996); AAA Girls Cross Country (2010, 2011, 2012, 2014, 2015); 6A Baseball (2017)
Plymouth Whitemarsh	A Boys Basketball (1963); AAA Baseball (1994); AAAA Boys Basketball (1997, 2010); AAA Wrestling (1998, 1999); 6A Girls Basketball (2022)
Quakertown	AAA Wrestling (1987, 1988, 2006)
Souderton	AAA Wrestling (1994); AAA Boys Volleyball (1998); AAA Girls Softball (2014); 6A Baseball (2019)
Springfield	AA Boys Cross Country (1999); AA Boys Tennis Singles (2000); AA Boys Track & Field (2014, 2015)
Upper Dublin	AA Boys Swimming (1993); AAA Boys Tennis Singles (1993); AAA Boys Tennis Doubles (1989); 6A Girls Basketball (2018, 2026)
Upper Merion	AAA Girls Cross Country (1997, 1998); AAA Boys Cross Country (1992)
Upper Moreland	AA Field Hockey (1989, 1991, 1992)
William Tennent	AAA Boys Cross Country (1975)
Wissahickon	AAA Girls Cross Country (2000); AAA Boys Golf (1995); B Boys Track & Field (1967); A Boys Track & Field (1972); AAA Boys Track & Field (1982)

*Before Council Rock Split into North and South in 2002

== SOL Code of Conduct ==
Perhaps the most important goal of the SOL is for athletes to respect each other, coaches, officials, and the game. The SOL created the "Code of Conduct" for "the interest of continued good relationships in the field of athletics". The Code of Conduct is often hung in or around high schools.

1. Show their respect for their country by standing attentively and removing hats when the American flag passes and during the playing and singing of the National Anthem.

2. Show their respect by standing for the Alma Maters of both schools.

3. Conduct themselves as ladies and gentlemen at all times, showing respect for visiting players and injured athletes, by not booing participants on the playing area, and by respecting property.

4. Show respect for the game officials and refrain from booing their decisions or interfering with their control of the contest.

5. Recognize that vulgarity and indecent gestures are unacceptable.

6. Cheer under the organized guidance of the cheerleaders. Cheers to interfere with the opponent's cheering are unacceptable. Foot stamping in the stands is to be eliminated.

7. Recognize that noisemakers and signs in any gymnasium or at any indoor contest are unacceptable.

8. Recognize that littering premises, throwing of confetti or paper, and tossing objects onto the playing area are unacceptable.

9. Support musical groups for indoor activities. However, such groups must be organized, school sponsored, and supervised to play only before games and during half-time.

10. Food and beverage to be in designated areas. The gymnasium and pool area are not acceptable areas for the consumption of food and beverages.

11. Follow the code of conduct for promoting good sportsmanship, adult and students alike.

== See also ==
Pennsylvania Interscholastic Athletic Association
