= Neshaminy School District =

School district in Pennsylvania

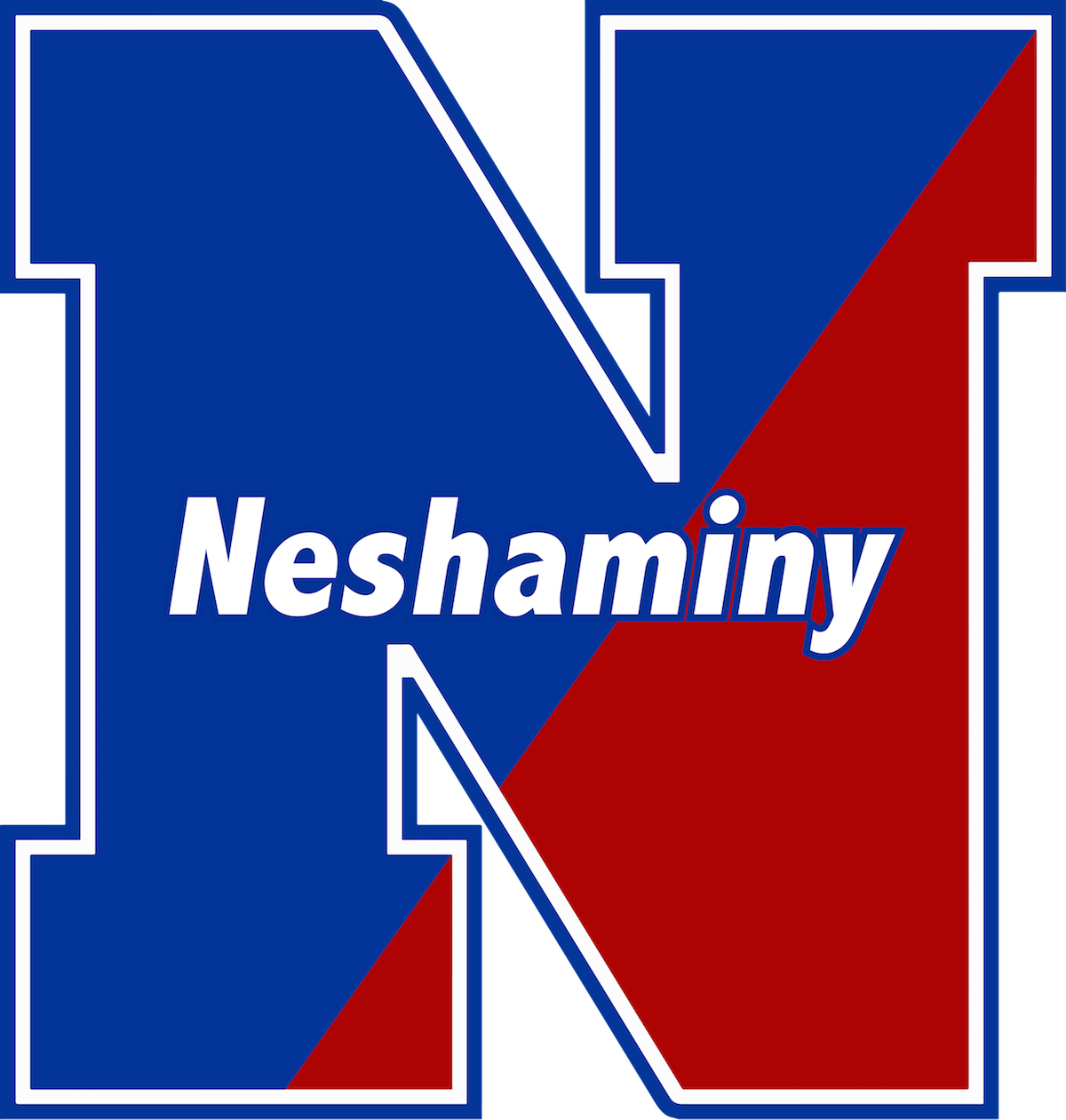

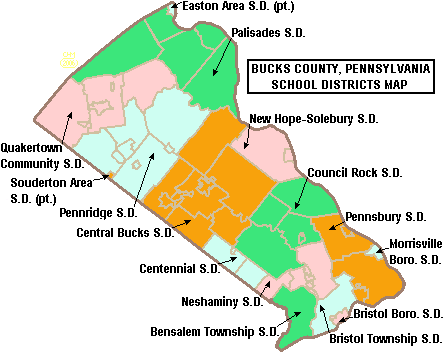

Address
- 2250 Langhorne-Yardley Road Langhorne, Pennsylvania; United States

District information
- Type: Public
- Established: 1950
- Enrollment: 9,037 (January 2020)

Other information
- Website: neshaminy.org

Neshaminy School District is a school district headquartered in Middletown Township, Bucks County, Pennsylvania.

The district serves the eastern Pennsylvania municipalities of Middletown Township, Langhorne, Langhorne Manor, Penndel, Hulmeville, and Lower Southampton Township all in Bucks County. Students from the Middletown divisions of Levittown also attend these schools.

Neshaminy School District encompasses approximately 28 square miles (73 km^{2}). According to 2000 federal census data, it serves a resident population of 69,638. Per Neshaminy School District documents, as of January 2020 the Neshaminy School District provided basic educational services to 9,037 pupils. Full-day kindergarten in all elementary schools was added starting in the 2014–2015 school year.

The Neshaminy School District serves a large and diverse population. Students comprise many different racial, ethnic, and economic backgrounds. District residents represent a wide range from lower-middle-class to highly affluent.

== History ==
The first public school in the area was established in Langhorne in 1836, and the district as it is known today was formed in 1950 by a conglomeration of smaller municipal districts.

Many Neshaminy facilities were constructed during the 1950s and 1960s following the development of the Levittown community at the southeast portion of the district. In 1975 a second high school was added (Maple Point) but was closed in 1982 and later converted into a middle school following a renovation project completed in 1993. Eisenhower Elementary School and Neshaminy Middle School were closed and the properties sold.

In June 2006, the Neshaminy School District began a massive $82 million renovation of Neshaminy High School, which was originally constructed as a combination high school and junior high school in the 1950s. Much of the original structure was demolished and completely rebuilt. The auditorium, 2 gymnasiums and circular library media center were all pre-existing but received extensive renovations. New classrooms, science labs, music rooms, tech education rooms, offices and common areas were added along with new parking lots and an expanded bus loading area.

In 2015, the district started a three-phase "Road Map" project to update older buildings, close three elementary schools to account for excess capacity (Heckman ES, Lower Southampton ES and Everett ES), and construct a new elementary school on the site of the old Tawanka Elementary School, which was demolished. Significant upgrades to several existing buildings (Sandburg MS, Poquessing MS, Ferderbar ES, Hoover ES, Miller ES and Schweitzer ES) were completed with funding from the federal Guaranteed Energy Savings Act including air conditioning, energy-efficient windows, roofing, lighting and other electrical upgrades. Additional upgrades included security features and online visitor registration kiosks. The final phase of the Road Map project was completed in August, 2017.

In September 2015, the fifth grade, formerly at elementary schools, was moved to middle schools.

In August 2023, as part of Neshaminy's roadmap plan to create a new elementary school next to Maple Point Middle School, the school board voted to name the building under construction 'Core Creek Elementary School,' taking the name from Core Creek Park next to the property. This new building opened in January 2025 after the closure of Pearl S. Buck ES in December 2024. The entire student body of Pearl S. Buck ES transferred to Core Creek ES at that time, and additional students from Tawanka ES and Herbert Hoover ES were redistricted to the new school the start of the 2025-2026 school year.

== Schools ==
The schools in the district are as follows; all elementary schools contain grades K–4, all middle schools contain grades 5–8, and Neshaminy High School contains grades 9–12.

- Joseph E Ferderbar Elementary School
- Herbert Hoover Elementary School
- Walter Miller Elementary School
- Albert Schweitzer Elementary School
- Core Creek Elementary School
- Tawanka Elementary School
- Carl Sandburg Middle School
- Poquessing Middle School
- Maple Point Middle School
- Neshaminy High School
- Neshaminy School District Virtual Academy

=== Former schools ===
- Pearl S. Buck Elementary School-Closed December 2024. Students were all redistricted to the newly-built Core Creek Elementary School building.
- Dwight D. Eisenhower Elementary School - Opened 1963, closed 1980's. District sold the building in 2013.
- Lower Southampton Elementary School - Opened 1950, closed 2016. Now used as Lower Southampton Early Childhood Learning Center, housing Neshaminy Pre-K Counts and BCIU classes.
- Neshaminy-Maple Point High School - The district was overcrowding at Neshaminy High, then known as Neshaminy-Langhorne High School, and considered initial plans for a second high school. The proposed design was later reduced in size. In 1972 the board of trustees decided to build the new school; 5 voted in favor, and 4 voted against. Maple Point opened in 1975 and was built for $10,000,000. At the time of Maple Point's opening, the class sizes at Neshaminy-Langhorne became smaller. There were people opposed to the new high school who called it a "Taj Mahal" and argued that the board of trustees did not adequately manage demographic data. By 1982 there were proposals to convert it into a middle school.
- Neshaminy Middle School/Junior High School - Opened 1965, closed 2008. Sold to and demolished by neighboring St. Mary Medical Center in 2012 to make way for a Rehabilitation Center.
- Oliver Heckman Elementary School - In the Langhorne borough limits, it was built in 1966, and it closed in August 2016. In 2023 the district board of trustees agreed to sell the building for $3,200,000. Currently vacant.
- Samuel Everett Elementary School - Opened 1955, closed 2015. Currently housing BCIU classes.
