= Kate Vrijmoet =

American artist (born 1966)

- Born: Kathleen Pontoski; 1966 (age 59–60); Philadelphia
- Known for: Painting
- Website: katevrijmoet.com

Kate Vrijmoet is an American artist who lives and works in Seattle.

== Biography ==
Kate Vrijmoet began formal art studies at Moore College of Art, Philadelphia, taking weekend classes while attending Cheltenham High School (1982–1983). She went on to study at the School of Visual and Performing Arts at Syracuse University, and was invited to teach there in 1994, earning her MFA in 1997. She studied painting with Evelina Brozgul at the School of the Museum of Fine Arts, Boston in 2004 and with Richard Ryan at Boston University from 2005 to 2006. After recognition in New York City for her project, 50 Paintings in 50 Days, her work was curated into a group show receiving press in the New York Times and the New York Journal News. In 2010 she had her first solo exhibition at the Center on Contemporary Art CoCA in Seattle, and was reviewed in the Seattle Times. Her painting, Shotgun Accident won third place in the 2010 Ecuador Biennale of Painting, a decision that has recently caused controversy according to the Ecuador newspaper El Telégrafo, which reported that many considered Vrijmoet the rightful first-place winner. Vrijmoet was one of 16 American artists whose work was included in the 5th Beijing International Art Biennale. Her painting, "Naked Snow Blower", a part of Vrijmoet's Accident's series, was exhibited in the National Museum of China beginning September 28, 2012. In 2014 she curated the Social Practice Art exhibit, "The Incredible Intensity of Just Being Human," in Seattle City Hall, a traveling exhibit aimed at ending the stigma and silence surrounding mental illness.

Selected works

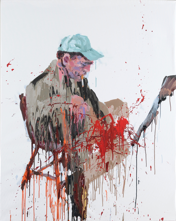
Shotgun Accident, Latex on Canvas, 63" x 50", 2009

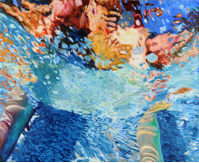
Ribs of disaster curving their assertion among the tentative haunters, Oil on Canvas, 7’ x 8’ 2008

== Work ==
Through paintings, installations and social art, Vrijmoet focuses on issues of consciousness, scale, accessibility and ownership. A student of anatomy since childhood, Vrijmoet has for three decades included life drawing in her daily practice. She is currently completing her Accident series and her Non-ordinary Reality series. In August, 2010, the Center on Contemporary Art in Seattle published a 42-page catalog for her solo show, Kate Vrijmoet: Essential Gestures. In 2011 Vrijmoet's work was featured in a South Seattle Community College showing, and during a solo show at the LANN Museum in Guayaquil, Ecuador.

Her profile was featured in the inaugural issue of the Huffington Post Arts Section. Kate discuses her work in detail in an interview published by the science and culture digest 3 Quarks Daily. In her exhibit book, The Incredible Intensity of Just Being Human[14], she writes, "Art connects us. It tells us we're human, we're like one another, we feel the same emotions. My mission as a human being, and my job as an artist, is to use art to create deep connections among us. Those deep connections already exist, but sometimes convention rewards us for ignoring them. I contend that the greater rewards come from exploring them.".

In 2011 Vrijmoet's installation piece "Mother May I…?" was exhibited at the Orange County Center on Contemporary Arts (OCCCA), in a show that was endorsed by Nicolas Bourriaud, who coined the term relational aesthetics, or Relational art. In 2012 this installation was featured in the largest artist-run, not for profit organization in Brooklyn, the Brooklyn Artists Waterfront Coalition's (BWAC) juried show. "Mother May I…?," — an interactive audio installment designed to address our fundamental sense of belonging — was awarded "Best Installation" by Charlotta Kotik, curator of the Brooklyn Museum of Art. Vrijmoet's work has featured in New York City shows juried by curators of the Metropolitan Museum of Art (Anne Strauss), the Guggenheim (Nat Trotman), and Museum of Modern Art (Paulina Pobocha).

In 2013 she began curating a Social Practice Art exhibit aimed at ending the stigma and silence surrounding mental illness. The Incredible Intensity of Just Being Human has been exhibited at the Seattle Center, and Highline College. In 2014 she won prestigious grants through Artist Trust and Seattle Department of Neighborhoods to further fund this exhibit in Seattle City Hall where civic leaders Mayor Ed Murray, Randy Revelle, Brady Walkinshaw, and Tina Orwall spoke at the opening reception about mental illness. Vrijmoet's project was supported by Seattle Office of Arts and Culture, and Allied Arts Foundation.

Also in 2013 she participated in SEAF with her social sculpture "Poor Impulse Control"- an example of relational art, social sculpture, or ironic participation. In this form the artist exploits the role of the viewer as the art object. The primary role of social sculpture is not one of beauty, but of intervention through discomfort. The audience has an interdependent relationship with the work. Of this social sculpture Vrijmoet writes, "The collapse of the emotional and physical boundaries inherent to the human experience is a recurrent theme in my work. [...] my work directly engages participants communally, even as it remains distinctly personal to each audience member. Although initiated by a single creator, audience participation is fundamental to making my work come to life."

In the catalog essay of her CoCA solo exhibit, "Essential Gestures", Elatia Harris writes of her work, "Any single image from the Accident series will freeze you where you stand. Motionlessly, you check yourself for parts and think, Oh, that's the thing, the thing that happened to me, even if no one sees it. The Water paintings, on the other hand, will dislocate you – you are pulled, plunged and buoyed, seeing up and through and down." Maine writer and art critic, Dan Kany, writes Vrijmoet's work takes a "supremely anti-modernist stance – following the idea that Modernism doesn't privilege the artist/author over the viewer." A show of her Accident Series Paintings was exhibited in 2013 at Columbia Basin College's Esvelt Gallery in Eastern Washington.

In 2014 she published an article The Broader Economic Impact of Donating Your Art, that went viral on social media outlets and was viewed more than 2 million times across the globe. This article continues to inspire dialog surrounding fundraising in the arts.

In 2015 Vrijmoet participated in The Richard Siken Project, in which 11 artists respond to The War of the Foxes, through Copper Canyon Press.
