= Mike Frederick =

American football player (born 1972)

No. 94, 97
- Position: Defensive end

Personal information
- Born: August 6, 1972 (age 54); Abington, Pennsylvania, U.S.
- Listed height: 6 ft 5 in (1.96 m)
- Listed weight: 280 lb (127 kg)

Career information
- High school: Neshaminy (Middletown Township, Bucks County, Pennsylvania)
- College: Virginia
- NFL draft: 1995: 3rd round, 94th overall pick

Career history
- Cleveland Browns (1995); Baltimore Ravens (1996–1998); New York Jets (1999)*; Tennessee Titans (1999); Philadelphia Eagles (2000)*
- * Offseason or practice squad member only

Awards and highlights
- First-team All-ACC (1994); Dudley Award (1994); Second-team All-ACC (1993)

Career NFL statistics
- Tackles: 40
- Sacks: 2
- Fumble recoveries: 1
- Stats at Pro Football Reference

Thomas Michael Frederick (born August 6, 1972) is an American former professional football player who was a defensive end in the National Football League (NFL). He played college football for the Virginia Cavaliers. He was selected in the 3rd round (94th overall) of the 1995 NFL draft by the Cleveland Browns.

== Professional career ==
Fredrick was selected in the third round (94th overall) of the 1995 NFL draft by the Cleveland Browns.

As a rookie, he appeared in 16 games recording 1.5 sacks. In 1996, following the Cleveland Browns relocation controversy and the forming of the Baltimore Ravens, Frederick became a starter for the Ravens at left defensive end where he started 11 games. He remained with the Ravens until 1998 as a back-up. On February 16, 1999 he signed with the New York Jets as an unrestricted free agent. On August 30, 1999 he was released by the Jets. Less than a week later on September 5 he was signed by the Tennessee Titans. While with the Titans, he appeared in 13 games and recorded a half sack. The following offseason, on July 23, 2000 he was signed by the Philadelphia Eagles. On August 27, 2000 he was released by the Eagles.
