= Pennsbury High School =

Location
- 608 South Olds Blvd (West Campus); 705 Hood Blvd (East Campus); Fairless Hills, Bucks County,, Pennsylvania 19030; United States; 40.173824°N 74.835327°W

Information
- Type: Public high school
- Established: 1951
- School district: Pennsbury School District
- Authority: Pennsylvania Department of Education
- Authorizer: United States Department of Education
- Principal: Stephanie Hultquist (Campus Principal)
- Staff: 218.69 (on an FTE basis)
- Gender: Co-Educational
- Enrollment: 2,847 (2024–25)
- Student to teacher ratio: 13.02
- Campus type: Suburban
- Colors: Orange and Black
- Slogan: Keep the Peace
- Song: Pennsbury Alma Mater"Alma Mater". The Reporter. 16 April 2020.
- Athletics conference: Suburban One League (SOL)
- Mascot: Falcon
- Nickname: Falcons
- Rivals: Neshaminy High School, Council Rock High School North, Council Rock High School South, Columbia High School (New Jersey)
- Newspaper: Pennsbury on Point
- Feeder schools: Charles H. Boehm, Pennwood, William Penn
- Website: phs.pennsburysd.org

Pennsbury High School is a four-year public high school located in Fairless Hills, Pennsylvania, United States. It is part of Pennsbury School District.

With 2,907 students enrolled for the 2021–2022 school year, Pennsbury High School is the largest high school in Bucks County and the tenth largest high school in the state of Pennsylvania. There are approximately 255 faculty members and staff. It is the only high school in Pennsbury School District, which has a total enrollment of 10,958 students and includes Bucks Technical High School and Intermediate Unit student totals.

Pennsbury had a graduating class of 800 students in 2018, of which 91% were college-bound. The school had seven National Merit Scholarship finalists and one winner.

== History ==
Established in 1948, the Pennsbury School District originally operated its high school out of the Fallsington Building until a new building was constructed on Makefield Road in 1951. After this, the Makefield Road building later became Pennwood Middle School, while the original Fallsington site now serves as the district's administration building and elementary school.

In 1962, Pennsbury significantly expanded with the opening of a new high school in Fairless Hills on Hood Boulevard. This campus connected to an existing complex that included Medill Bair High school (1960) and the former William Penn Jr. High (1955). Although not on campus, Charles Boehm High school was a part of the district, housing freshmen and sophomores. Medill Bair High school and William Penn Jr. High were merged to accommodate freshmen and sophomore students, while juniors and seniors attended Pennsbury High school.

On January 12, 2007, a school bus veered into a group of students as they were leaving school. Seventeen Pennsbury High School students were injured and hospitalized, one of whom had their leg amputated.

On December 5, 2023, Pennsbury High School's former band director was arrested after an investigation by the FBI found him to be in possession of over two-thousand images of 'Child Sex Abuse Materials'. He pleaded guilty to a charge of child pornography in September of 2024. There was no evidence of abuse of any of his students.

== Extracurricular activities ==
=== Prom ===
In 2002, Pennsbury High School's prom tradition caught the attention of Sports Illustrated senior writer Michael Bamberger. After writing an article for the magazine about the 2002 prom, Bamberger wrote a book, Wonderland: A Year in the Life of an American High School, which chronicled the senior year of a group of Pennsbury students.

In 2004, the prom was awarded Best Prom by Reader's Digest as part of their "America's 100 Best" feature. In 2004, singer-songwriter John Mayer performed for a crowd of nearly a thousand students. Various other artists, including Maroon 5 have also performed at previous proms. In 2017, DJ Pauly D from the television program Jersey Shore made an appearance with Questlove. Pauly D performed again in 2018, preceded by singer and actor Drake Bell, best known for his role as Drake Parker on the Nickelodeon television show Drake & Josh.

=== Instrumental music ===
The Pennsbury School District has been recognized times as one of the "Best Communities For Music Education" over the past 19 years.

The Marching band appeared in 2018 for the second time in The Tournament of Roses Parade on New Year's Day in Pasadena, California. Pennsbury's Marching Band has performed as the honor band of the 6abc Dunkin' Donuts Thanksgiving Day Parade in Philadelphia for the 35 consecutive years (1983–present).

=== Athletics ===
The Falcons are part of the Suburban One League. Pennsbury football teams went undefeated in 1972 and 1974; won a state championship in 1980, playing in the longest football playoff game in Pennsylvania high school athletics history; and went undefeated again in 1985, when they were ranked by some newsletters as the best high school football team in Pennsylvania.

Pennsbury's baseball team won the PIAA 6A State Championship in 2017.

In the 2020-2021 season, Pennsbury's ice hockey team won its first SHSHL title, going 10-1-1 on the season and defeating Council Rock South 7-4 in the final.

== Notable alumni ==
- Lavoy Allen, former professional basketball player
- Christy Altomare, Broadway actress and singer songwriter
- Robert Curtis Brown, actor
- Sean M. Carroll, theoretical cosmologist and popular science writer
- Chris Cole, professional skateboarder
- Robert Costa, political reporter
- John Galloway, Democratic member of the Pennsylvania House of Representatives
- Drew Gress, jazz musician and composer
- Hallie Jackson, NBC News Correspondent
- Bart Johnson, actor
- Andrea Katz, politician serving as a member of the New Jersey General Assembly for the 8th legislative district since 2024
- Richard Kind, actor
- Mark McCorkle, screenwriter, television writer and film and television producer
- Marla Mindelle, actress, writer and composer
- Kristin Minter, actress
- Jimmy Ockford, professional soccer player
- Victoria Pedretti, actress
- Jack Perez, film director
- James M. Poterba, economist
- Asher Roth, pop rap artist
- Matthew Schuler, singer, contestant on The Voice
- Ann Shoket, editor-in-chief of Seventeen magazine
- Troy Vincent, former professional football player
- Lindsey Vuolo, Playboy Playmate
- Lester R. Walker, architect and author
- Zach Woods, actor and comedian
- Jesse Colin Young, singer, songwriter, and founding member of The Youngbloods
- Joseph Reinhart, Peter Helmis, and Colin Mahony; musicians and founding members of Algernon Cadwallader
