= Wesley E. Craig =

US Army major general (b. 1946)

Wesley E. Craig Jr.
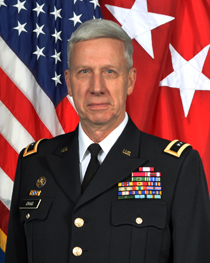
- Craig as a major general in 2011
- Born: September 13, 1946 (age 80); Germantown, Philadelphia, Pennsylvania, US
- Education: Temple University; United States Army War College
- Spouse: Marda L. Phelps
- Children: 2
- Military career
- Service: United States Army
- Service years: 1968–2006; 2011–2015
- Rank: Major General
- Unit: Pennsylvania National Guard
- Commands: Adjutant General of Pennsylvania; 28th Infantry Division; 56th Infantry Brigade; 1st Squadron, 104th Cavalry Regiment
- Awards: Army Distinguished Service Medal; Legion of Merit; Army Meritorious Service Medal (4); Army Commendation Medal (2); Army Achievement Medal; Complete List
- Other work: Manager and executive, Strawbridge & Clothier

Wesley E. Craig Jr. (born 13 September 1946) is a retired United States Army officer. A longtime member of the Pennsylvania Army National Guard, he attained the rank of major general as commander of the 28th Infantry Division and Adjutant General of Pennsylvania. Craig served from 1968 to 2006 and 2011 to 2015, and his awards included the Army Distinguished Service Medal, Legion of Merit, Army Meritorious Service Medal with three oak leaf clusters, Army Commendation Medal with oak leaf cluster, and Army Achievement Medal.

A native of Germantown, Pennsylvania, Craig was raised and educated in Oreland, Pennsylvania and graduated from Cheltenham High School in 1964. In 1968, Craig received a BBA degree from Temple University. He completed the Reserve Officers' Training Corps program while in college, and he was commissioned as a second lieutenant in the Transportation Corps and served on army active duty from August 1968 to August 1970. He was then was assigned to the Army Reserve Control Group, where he remained from August 1970 to January 1971. After his active duty army service, Craig pursued a civilian career as a manager and executive with the Strawbridge & Clothier department store chain.

Craig joined the Pennsylvania Army National Guard in January 1971. Initially assigned to 1st Squadron, 223rd Cavalry Regiment, Craig remained with the organization when it was redesignated the 104th Cavalry Regiment in 1975. He served in several staff positions with the 104th Cavalry, and remained with the organization until September 1986, when he was assigned as human resources staff officer (S-1) on the staff of the 213th Regional Support Group. In February 1988, he was assigned to command of 1-104th Cavalry, and he held this position until January 1992. From January 1992 to January 1996, he was executive officer of the 56th Infantry Brigade, and he commanded the brigade from January 1996 to September 1999. From September 1999 to November 2000, Craig was assigned to the headquarters of Pennsylvania's State Area Command and performed duty at the 28th Infantry Division headquarters.

Craig was the 28th Division's assistant division commander from December 2000 to October 2003. From October 2003 to October 2006, Craig commanded the 28th Infantry Division. During his command, the division deployed over 8,000 Soldiers to the peacekeeping mission in Kosovo and combat in Iraq and Afghanistan, and Craig conducted numerous command visits to forward locations. In addition, he led the division during its 2005 participation in the Exercise Bright Star multi-national mission in Egypt. Craig retired in 2006; in 2011, he returned to active service when he was selected to serve as Adjutant General of Pennsylvania. He held this position until retiring again in 2015.

== Early life ==
Wesley Earle Craig Jr. was born in Germantown, Pennsylvania on 13 September 1946, the son of W. Earle Craig Sr. and Grace E. (Boyles) Craig. He family resided in Oreland, and in 1964 Craig graduated from Cheltenham High School. He then attended Temple University, from which he received his Bachelor of Business Administration degree in 1968.

While at Temple, Craig took part in the Reserve Officers' Training Corps program, which he completed as a distinguished military graduate; at graduation, he received his commission as a second lieutenant in the United States Army. Assigned to the Transportation Corps, he completed his officer basic course at Fort Eustis, Virginia. He then served at Fort Stewart, Georgia until August 1970, where his postings included battalion legal officer, company executive officer, and battalion assistant adjutant. From August 1970 to January 1971, Craig was assigned to the United States Army Reserve Control Group. Upon returning to Pennsylvania following his active army service, Craig began a civilian career as a manager and executive with Strawbridge & Clothier, a Philadelphia-area department store chain.

== Start of career ==
In January 1971, Craig joined 1st Squadron, 223rd Cavalry Regiment, a unit of the Pennsylvania Army National Guard. Assigned as the squadron motor officer, he was responsible for organizational maintenance of the organization's equipment and vehicles. In January 1975, the 223rd Cavalry was redesignated the 104th Cavalry Regiment, and Craig continued in his role as motor officer. In September 1975, he was assigned as 1st Squadron's logistics staff officer (S-4), and he served until September 1976. He was then reassigned to the motor officer's position, where he continued to serve until February 1981.

From February 1981 to February 1982, Craig was assigned as 1-104th Cavalry's intelligence staff officer (S-2). He was then appointed as squadron plans, operations, and training officer (S-3), where he remained until May 1984. From May 1984 to September 1986, Craig served as executive officer and second-in-command of 1-104th Cavalry. He was then assigned as the human resources staff officer (S-1) on the staff of the 213th Regional Support Group, where he served until February 1988.

From February 1998 to January 1992, Craig commanded 1st Squadron, 104th Cavalry. He was then assigned as executive officer of the 56th Infantry Brigade, and he served in this position until January 1996. He was next assigned to command the brigade, and he carried out this assignment until September 1999.

=== Military education ===
- Transportation Officer Basic Course
- Armor Officer Advanced Course
- Combined Arms and Services Staff School
- United States Army Command and General Staff College
- United States Army War College
- Senior Reserve Officer Course, 2002
- Adjutants General National Security Seminar, 2012

== Continued career ==
From September 1999 to November 2000, Craig was assigned to the Pennsylvania National Guard's State Area Command while attached to the headquarters of the 28th Infantry Division. From December 2000 to October 2003, he was the division's assistant division commander. In October 2003, he succeeded Walter F. Pudlowski Jr. as commander of the division and was promoted to major general. During his command, the 28th Division deployed soldiers worldwide for missions including peacekeeping in Kosovo and combat in Afghanistan and Iraq. Craig's duties included numerous command visits to Pennsylvania soldiers serving in those forward locations. In addition, he led the division in Egypt during its 2005 participation in the multi-national Exercise Bright Star mission.

Craig retired from the military in October 2006. In February 2011, he was selected to serve as Adjutant General of Pennsylvania. Pennsylvania's Partnership for Peace counterparts include Lithuania; in addition to global war on terrorism deployments to Iraq and Afghanistan, Pennsylvania troops served in Lithuania, Latvia, and Estonia during Craig's tenure, and made numerous command visits to each country. He retired for the second time in January 2015.

Craig's professional and civic memberships included:

- United Service Organization of Pennsylvania and Southern New Jersey (chairman)
- Pennsylvania Committee for Employer Support of the Guard and Reserve (chairman)
- Army War College Foundation Board of Directors
- National Guard Association of the United States
- Combat Vehicle Task Force, National Guard Association of the United States (chairman)
- American Legion
- Association of the United States Army
- Military Officers Association of America
- Our Community Salutes, Philadelphia (chairman)

== Awards ==
Among Craig's federal awards and decorations were:

- Army Distinguished Service Medal
- Legion of Merit
- Meritorious Service Medal with 3 bronze oak leaf clusters
- Army Commendation Medal with 1 bronze oak leaf cluster
- Army Achievement Medal
- Army Reserve Components Achievement Medal with 1 silver oak leaf cluster and 1 bronze oak leaf cluster
- National Defense Service Medal with 2 bronze service stars
- Global War on Terrorism Service Medal
- Armed Forces Reserve Medal with gold hourglass
- Army Service Ribbon
- Army Reserve Components Overseas Training Ribbon with numeral 5

Craig's state awards included:

- Pennsylvania Distinguished Service Medal
- Pennsylvania Meritorious Service Medal (with 1 Silver Star)
- Pennsylvania Service Ribbon (with Numeral 7)
- Pennsylvania Twenty Year Service Ribbon (with 3 Silver Stars)
- Major General Thomas R. White Jr. Medal
- General Thomas J. Stewart Medal
- Governor's Unit Citation
- Adjutant General's Staff Identification Badge

Craig is a recipient of the Mary G. Roebling Distinguished Service Award from the First Region of the Association of the United States Army for his military service. In addition, he received the Office of the Secretary of Defense Medal for Exceptional Public Service for his post-retirement support of the military. In 2016, Craig received induction in to the US Army National ROTC Hall of Fame. In 2023, he was inducted into the Pennsylvania Department of Military and Veterans Affairs Hall of Fame.

== Dates of rank ==
Craig's dates of rank were:

- Major General (Retired), 31 January 2015
- Major General, 6 May 2011
- Major General (Retired), 22 October 2006
- Major General, 12 October 2003
- Brigadier General, 1 December 2000
- Colonel, 14 February 1996
- Lieutenant Colonel, 3 December 1986
- Major, 24 March 1982
- Captain 20 October 1972
- First Lieutenant 8 August 1969
- Second Lieutenant 13 June 1968
