= John Petercuskie =

American football player and coach (1925–2018)

Biographical details
- Born: January 31, 1925; Old Forge, Pennsylvania
- Died: April 20, 2018 (aged 93)
- Education: East Stroudsburg University of Pennsylvania (1950)

Playing career
- c. 1949: East Stroudsburg
- Position: Guard

Coaching career (HC unless noted)
- 1951–1952: Old Forge HS (PA) (assistant)
- 1953–1959: Neshaminy HS (PA) (assistant)
- 1960–1965: Neshaminy HS (PA)
- 1966–1968: Dartmouth (DL)
- 1969–1972: Boston College (DC)
- 1973–1977: Princeton (DL)
- 1978–1984: Cleveland Browns (ST)
- 1987–1988: Harvard (DL)
- 1989–1994: Liberty (DL/ST)

Head coaching record
- Overall: 59–1–5

John Stephen Petercuskie (January 31, 1925 – April 20, 2018) was an American former football coach.

== Military service ==
After graduating high school in the summer of 1942, he enlisted in the United States Marine Corps. He was trained as a radar operator on the SCR-270 and attained the rank of Sergeant. As a member of Air Warning Squadron 8, he took part in the Battle of Okinawa in 1945.

== Coaching career ==
He served as head coach at Neshaminy High School from 1960 to 1965, garnering a 59–1–5 record. He also served on the coaching staffs of college football teams at Dartmouth College, Boston College, Princeton University, Harvard University, Liberty University, and as an assistant coach (defensive line and special teams coach) on the Cleveland Browns from 1978 to 1984. In 2010, a bronze statue of his likeness was unveiled at Harry P. Franks Stadium in Langhorne, Pennsylvania. He is a member of the Bucks County Sports Hall of Fame, Neshaminy Hall of Fame, Scranton Hall of Fame, East Stroudsburg Hall of Fame, Lackawanna County Hall of Fame, Luzerne County Hall of Fame and Pennsylvania Coaches Hall of Fame. Petercuskie died at his home on April 20, 2018.
