= Lester R. Walker =

American architect and author

Lester R. Walker is an American architect and author. He is a former adjunct professor of architecture at City College of New York.

Walker was a pioneer in the tiny house movement.

== Early life and education ==
Walker received a BA in architecture from Pennsylvania State University and a master’s in architecture from Yale University.

== Career ==
For 20 years, Walker was an adjunct professor of architecture at the City College of New York.

In 1970, he moved to Woodstock, New York.

Walker is preservationist and director emeritus of the Byrdcliffe Colony. He served on its board starting in 1983.

== Books ==
- American Shelter: An Illustrated Encyclopedia of the American Home
- Tiny Houses: or How to Get Away From It All
- Carpentry for Children
- The Tiny Book of Tiny Houses
- Housebuilding for Children: Step-by-Step Plans for Houses Children Can Build Themselves (1988)
- American Homes: An Illustrated Encyclopedia of Domestic Architecture
- A Little House of My Own: 47 Grand Designs for 47 Tiny Houses
- Designing Houses
- Block Building for Children: Making Buildings of the World with the Ultimate Construction Toy (1995)
- Designing a House: An Illustrated Guide to Planning Your Own Home
- American Shelter: An Illustrated Encyclopedia of the American Home
