= United Junior/Senior High School =

United Junior/Senior High School may refer to:

- United Senior High School (Illinois) — sometimes still labeled as "United Junior/Senior High School"
- United Junior/Senior High School (Pennsylvania)

== See also ==
- United High School (disambiguation) for schools with similar names
