= Homer-Center Junior/Senior High School =

Coordinates: 40.53262°N 79.15986°W

Homer-Center Junior/Senior High school

Location
- 70 Wildcat Lane; Homer City, Indiana, Pennsylvania 15748; United States

Information
- School type: Public Junior/Senior High School
- School district: Homer-Center
- NCES District ID: 4213290
- Superintendent: Ralph J. Cecere Jr.
- NCES School ID: 421329002331
- Principal: Jody Rainey
- Teaching staff: 28.00 (FTE)
- Grades: 7-12
- Enrollment: 405 (2023-2024)
- Student to teacher ratio: 14.46
- Colors: Black and White
- Athletics conference: Heritage Conference
- Team name: Wildcats
- Rival: Blairsville Middle/High School-Indiana Middle/High School
- Newspaper: H-C Observer
- Yearbook: The Wildcat Tale
- Communities served: Homer City, Center Township
- Feeder schools: Homer-Center Elementary School

The Homer-Center High School serves grades 7-12, and is located just south of the district's elementary school on Wildcat Lane. Originally constructed in 1959, at a cost of $2.1 million, the building underwent its second complete renovation from 2008-10.

== The Homerdome ==
One of the facilities in the high school complex is the Homerdome, which is the school gymnasium. Constructed in 1959, the most notable feature is the seven lofty arches, each constructed out of 90 tons of concrete and steel, supporting the barrel-vault roof which is 40 feet tall at its highest point. The second most notable feature of the Homerdome is the large fiberglass/aluminum window, rehabilitated in 1985, this window has over 600 sections, making it 50 feet wide and 20 feet tall at its highest point. The only items remaining in the Homerdome since the 2008-10 renovation is two murals donated by the class of 2001 and the LED scoreboards, at this point, the floors were stripped to the bare concrete and replaced.

== Athletics ==
Homer-Center is a member of the 10-school Heritage Conference which resides within the PIAA-District VI.:

- Baseball - Class AA
- Basketball - Class AA
- Cross Country - Class AA
- Football - Class AA
- Golf - Class AAAA
- Softball - Class A
- Track and field - Class AA
- Volleyball - Class A

== Vocational Education ==
Students in grades 10-12 have the opportunity to attend the Indiana County Technology Center in White Township for part of their school day if they wish to obtain training in a specific area that the ICTC offers.

== Academics ==
Credits required for graduation will begin to accumulate at the start of the ninth grade year.

=== Coursework Breakdown ===
- English - 4 Credits
- Social Studies - 4 Credits
- Math - 4 Credits
- Science - 3 Credits
- Arts and Humanities - 2 Credits
- Family/Consumer Sciences - 1/4 Credit
- Physical Education - 1 Credit, 2 Credits starting with the class of 2014
- Health/Wellness Project - 1/2 Credit when completed
- Graduation Project - 1/2 Credit when completed

== Programs of Studies ==
There are three Courses of Study at HCHS

- Academic
- Business Education
- Technology
- Indiana County Technology Center

=== Course Offerings ===
- English and Reading
- Modern Language - including Spanish I, II, III and IV and French I
- Family/Consumer Sciences - Including the required course in Grade 9
- Art
- Mathematics
- Science
- Music - Including Band and Chorus
- Social Studies
- Health and Wellness
- Physical Education
- Supplemental Courses - Including the Arts/Humanities Credit required courses
- Business Education
- Technology Education

=== Notable alumni ===
- Patricia Hilliard Robertson, NASA Astronaut
- Ben McAdoo, Former Head Coach, New York Giants
- Mya Zemlock, Author of Heartless
- Joe Rhoades, 2022 Best Newly Hired teacher New Story Indiana, 2023 Best 1st Year teacher Conemaugh Valley SD, 2024 Conemaugh Valley SD teacher of the year

=== Awards and recognition ===
- Roxanne Rouse, an English Department faculty member, was a semi-finalist for the 2005 Pennsylvania Teacher of the Year Award. Math teacher Mark Butler was a finalist for the 2007 Pennsylvania Teacher of the Year Award.
- Suzanne Mazur, a Math Department faculty member was inducted into the Penn State Behrend Lions Athletic Hall of Fame in September 2007.
