= United School District =

United School District may refer to:

- United School District (Pennsylvania)
- United Community Unit School District #304 in Illinois
