= Patricia Hilliard =

Patricia Hilliard may refer to:

- Patricia Robertson, American astronaut
- Patricia Hilliard (actress), British actress
