= Saltsburg Middle-High School =

Location
- 84 Trojan Lane; Saltsburg, Indiana County, PA 15681; 40.49174°N 79.44967°W

Information
- Type: Public middle/high school
- Established: 1984; 42 years ago
- School district: Blairsville-Saltsburg School District
- NCES District ID: 4203750
- Superintendent: Philip Martell
- CEEB code: 394367
- NCES School ID: 420375002353
- Principal: Tracy Richards
- Faculty: 27.64 (FTE)
- Grades: 6-12
- Enrollment: 276 (2019-20)
  - Grade 6: 36
  - Grade 7: 35
  - Grade 8: 45
  - Grade 9: 45
  - Grade 10: 37
  - Grade 11: 42
  - Grade 12: 36
- Student to teacher ratio: 9.99:1
- Colors: Red and White
- Athletics conference: PIAA
- Nickname: Trojans
- Rival: Blairsville Middle-High School
- Feeder schools: Saltsburg Elementary School

Saltsburg Middle-High School, established in 1984, served students from Saltsburg Borough, Conemaugh and Young Townships in Indiana County and Loyalhanna Township in Westmoreland County. The campus was located on Route 286 in Conemaugh Township.

== School structure ==
Middle school students transition from elementary to secondary through the 6th-8th grade program, which offers four core subjects, "block" classes, and "rotation" classes. They also are assigned to a monthly Adviser-Advisee Program that promotes academic success and also serves as the facilitation point for the district's Graduation Project.

== Curriculum ==
To graduate from SMHS, a student must obtain 23.2 credits of coursework and complete a graduation project.

Coursework is as follows:

Subject Area	#/Credits	Notes
English	4.0	
Social Studies	*4	ICTC Students only need 3 Credits
Math	3.0	
Science	3.0	
Physical Education	Varies	1 Course each year
Health	0.5	
Arts/Humanities	2.0	

Approximately 10% of Saltsburg High School students attend the Indiana County Technology Center in nearby Indiana for half of their school day.

=== Matriculation ===
- 50% of graduates attend four-year schools,
- 40% attend two-year or technical schools
- 10% seek employment or military options.

== Extracurricular activities ==
=== Athletics ===
Saltsburg is in PIAA District 6:
Fall

- Football
- Golf
- Volleyball

Winter

- Basketball

Spring

- Baseball
- Track and field
