= Ben McAdoo =

American football coach (born 1977)

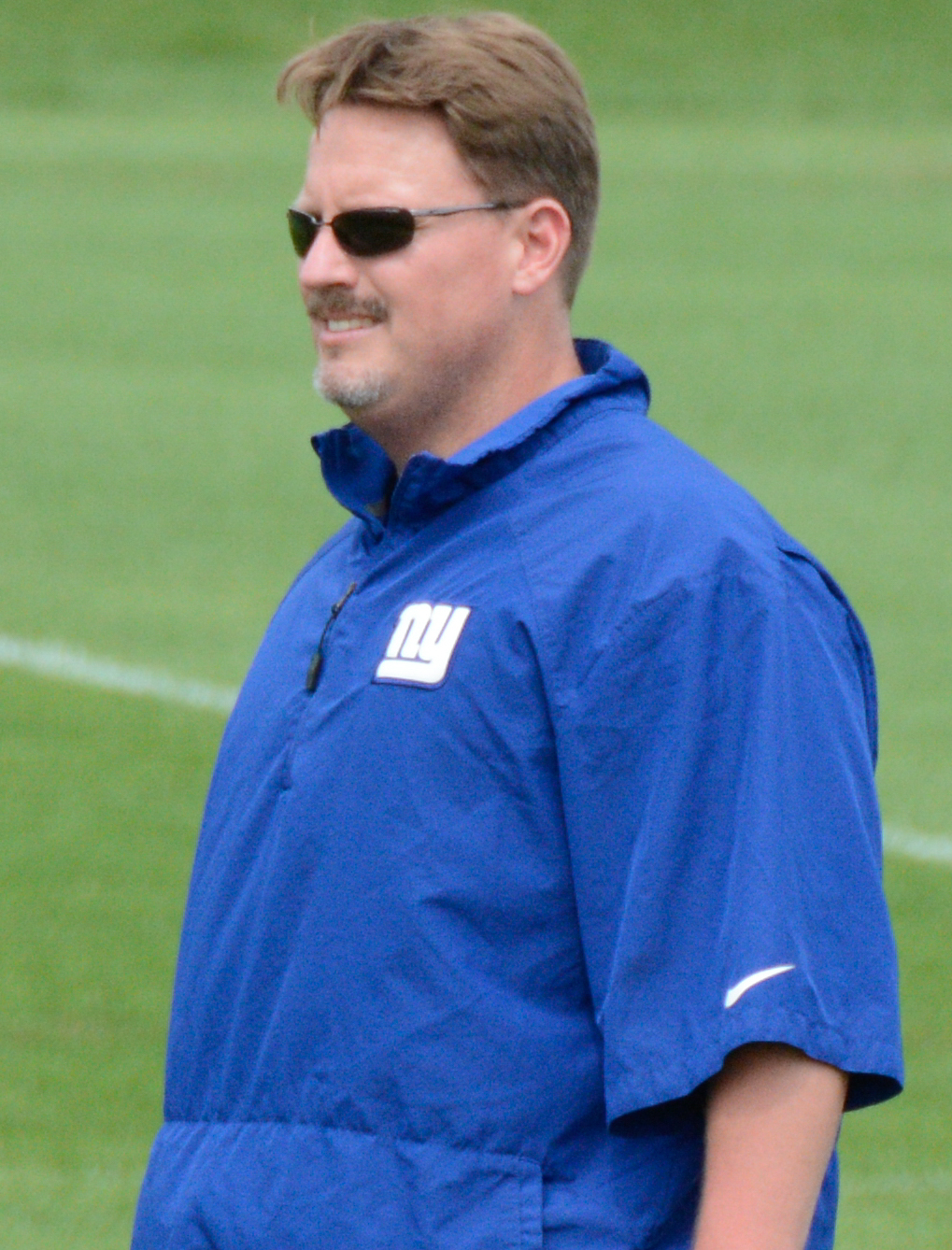
- McAdoo coaching the New York Giants in 2016

Personal information
- Born: July 9, 1977 (age 49); Homer City, Pennsylvania, U.S.

Career information
- High school: Homer City (PA) Homer-Center
- College: Indiana (PA)

Career history
- Homer-Center HS (PA) (1996–1997) Assistant coach; Indiana Area HS (PA) (1998–1999) Assistant coach; Michigan State (2001) Graduate assistant; Fairfield (2002) Offensive line coach & tight ends coach; Pittsburgh (2003) Graduate assistant; New Orleans Saints (2004) Offensive quality control coach; San Francisco 49ers (2005) Assistant offensive line coach; Green Bay Packers (2006–2013); Tight ends coach (2006–2011); Quarterbacks coach (2012–2013); New York Giants (2014–2017); Offensive coordinator (2014–2015); Head coach (2016–2017); Jacksonville Jaguars (2020) Quarterbacks coach; Dallas Cowboys (2021) Consultant; Carolina Panthers (2022) Offensive coordinator; New England Patriots (2024–2025); Senior offensive assistant (2024); Senior defensive assistant (2025)

Awards and highlights
- Super Bowl champion (XLV)

Head coaching record
- Regular season: 13–15 (.464)
- Postseason: 0–1 (.000)
- Career: 13–16 (.448)
- Coaching profile at Pro Football Reference

Benjamin Lee McAdoo (born July 9, 1977) is an American football coach who is currently serving as a senior defensive assistant of the New England Patriots in the National Football League (NFL). McAdoo was most notably the head coach of the New York Giants from 2016 to 2017, after serving as their offensive coordinator the previous two years under former head coach Tom Coughlin. He was fired from that position on December 4, 2017 following a 2–10 start, along with benching longtime starting quarterback Eli Manning. At the time of his termination, his 28 regular season games were the fewest by a Giants coach since 1930. Prior to working for the Patriots, McAdoo had also served as an assistant coach for several college football teams, as well as for the New Orleans Saints, the San Francisco 49ers, Green Bay Packers, Jacksonville Jaguars, and Carolina Panthers.

== Early life ==
McAdoo was born in Homer City, Pennsylvania. He graduated from Homer-Center Junior/Senior High School in 1995. McAdoo attended Indiana University of Pennsylvania (IUP) and earned a degree in health and physical education. Later, he received his master's degree in kinesiology from Michigan State University.

== Coaching career ==
=== Early career ===
Ben spent his time at Homer Center in Homer City PA. He was a leading tight end and then went on to be a coach. While attending Indiana University of Pennsylvania (IUP), McAdoo began working as an assistant high school coach in his sophomore year of college. He returned to his alma mater Homer-Center to be an assistant coach for the 1996 and 1997 seasons, then he was an assistant at Indiana Area High School from 1998 to 1999. McAdoo graduated from IUP summa cum laude in health and physical education.

He then became a graduate assistant for the Michigan State Spartans football team under head coach Bobby Williams while pursuing a master's degree in kinesiology at Michigan State University. In the 2001 season, McAdoo earned his first collegiate coaching position as a graduate assistant for special teams and offense.

McAdoo was the offensive line and tight ends coach at Fairfield University for the 2002 season, in what would be the final season for the Fairfield Stags football team. In 2003, McAdoo became a graduate assistant at the University of Pittsburgh under head coach Walt Harris and helped the team in the 2003 Continental Tire Bowl.

After initially accepting an assistant coach position at Akron, McAdoo resigned to become offensive quality control coach for the New Orleans Saints in 2004 under head coach Jim Haslett. McAdoo interviewed with offensive coordinator Mike McCarthy.

McAdoo coached tight ends and offensive tackles at Stanford for the 2005 spring camp, then resigned to be assistant offensive line and quality control coach for the San Francisco 49ers, reuniting with Mike McCarthy. In 2006, McCarthy became head coach for the Green Bay Packers and added McAdoo to his staff as tight ends coach. McAdoo coached tight ends for the Packers until the 2011 season, and then coached quarterbacks from 2012 to 2013. McAdoo was a member of the coaching staff of the 2010 Packers team that won Super Bowl XLV.

=== New York Giants ===
==== Offensive coordinator (2014–2015) ====
In 2014, McAdoo joined Tom Coughlin’s staff as the offensive coordinator for the New York Giants. In his first season as offensive coordinator, the Giants offense improved from the 28th-highest-scoring offense in 2013 under Kevin Gilbride to 13th in 2014. In 2015, the offense took another leap forward, becoming the sixth-highest-scoring offense despite losing starting left tackle Will Beatty, starting wide receiver Victor Cruz, and starting tight end Larry Donnell for most of the season due to injury.

==== Head coach (2016–2017) ====
On January 14, 2016, McAdoo was named the Giants’ 17th head coach in franchise history. On September 11, 2016, McAdoo won his first game as head coach when the Giants defeated the Dallas Cowboys 20–19. The Giants finished the 2016 season with an 11–5 record under McAdoo, tying the franchise record held by Dan Reeves in 1993 for most regular season wins by a first year head coach. The Giants returned to the playoffs for the first time since 2011, but lost to the Green Bay Packers 38–13. During the week leading up to their playoff game, wide receivers Victor Cruz, Odell Beckham Jr., Sterling Shepard and Roger Lewis were on vacation on a boat in Miami with singer Trey Songz, which some outlets largely contributed to the loss.

The Giants' 2017 season was marred by numerous player injuries as well as multiple controversies, which included some players being suspended for team violations and claims that McAdoo had lost the locker room and didn't care about it. The season began with an 0–5 start, the first for the team since 2013. They broke the spell with a road victory in Week 6 against the Denver Broncos. On November 28, 2017 McAdoo replaced Eli Manning with Geno Smith prior to the Week 13 game against the Oakland Raiders, which ended Manning's 210-consecutive start streak. This marked an uproar in the Giants community, and was widely seen as the beginning of the end of McAdoo's tenure with the Giants. After losing 24–17 to the Raiders and with the team sitting at 2–10, McAdoo was fired by the Giants on December 4, 2017, along with general manager Jerry Reese.

=== Jacksonville Jaguars ===
On February 11, 2020, McAdoo was hired by the Jacksonville Jaguars as their quarterbacks coach. He was let go following the season.

=== Dallas Cowboys ===
On May 26, 2021, McAdoo was hired by the Dallas Cowboys as a consultant.

=== Carolina Panthers ===
On January 24, 2022, McAdoo was hired by the Carolina Panthers as their offensive coordinator under head coach Matt Rhule, replacing Joe Brady. He was not retained by new head coach Frank Reich after the season.

=== New England Patriots ===
On February 6, 2024, McAdoo was hired by the New England Patriots as a senior offensive assistant.

On February 5, 2025, McAdoo's position was changed to senior defensive assistant.

== Personal life ==
McAdoo has known his wife, Toni, a fellow native of Homer City, since elementary school. They married in 2006 and have two children: A daughter, Larkin, and a son, BJ.

== Head coaching record ==
Team	Year	Regular season					Postseason			
Team	Year	Won	Lost	Ties	Win %	Finish	Won	Lost	Win %	Result
NYG	2016	11	5	0	.688	2nd in NFC East	0	1	.000	Lost to Green Bay Packers in NFC Wild Card Game
NYG	2017	2	10	0	.167	Fired	—	—	—	—
Total		13	15	0	.464		0	1	.000	
