= River Valley School District (Pennsylvania) =

School district in Pennsylvania

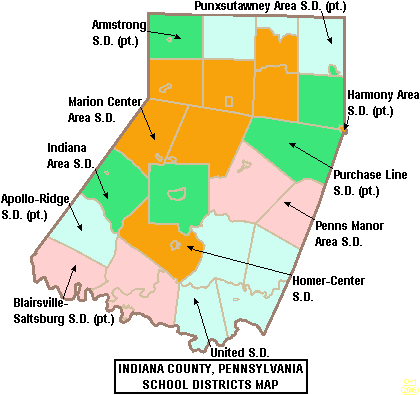

Address
- 102 School Lane Blairsville, Indiana County, Pennsylvania, 15717; United States

District information
- Type: Public
- Superintendent: Phil Martell
- Asst. superintendent(s): Regina Geesey

Students and staff
- Athletic conference: PIAA District 6
- District mascot: Panthers
- Colors: Aero Blue, Black

Other information
- Website: https://rivervalleyschools.org/

The main campus is located in Blairsville Pa the STEAM academy as well as a second elementary school share a campus in Saltsburg

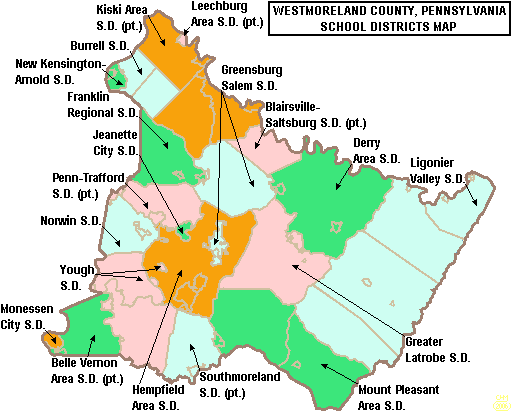
River Valley School District region in Westmoreland County

River Valley School District (before 2022: Blairsville-Saltsburg School District) is a small, rural school district that spans portions of two counties. In Indiana County it covers the Boroughs of Blairsville and Saltsburg and Black Lick Township, Burrell Township and Conemaugh Township. In Westmoreland County it covers Loyalhanna Township. The district encompasses approximately 142 square miles (370 km^{2}). Per the 2000 Census, the district had approximately 16,000 residents. According to 2000 federal census data, it serves a resident population of 14,363 people. In 2009, the district residents’ per capita income was $15,663, while the median family income was $37,257. In the Commonwealth, the median family income was $49,501 and the United States median family income was $49,445, in 2010.

The name change was approved by the Board of Directors on May 19, 2021, in a 6-3 vote, effective July 1, 2021; however, as of February 2022, a news article had stated the school district was "in the process of being renamed."

== Alignment ==
Students residing in Burrell and Black Lick Townships and Blairsville in Indiana County attend the thirty-six acre Blairsville campus in Burrell Township, containing the Blairsville Elementary School (K-5), Blairsville Middle-High School (6-12), as well as the district administrative offices. Students residing in Conemaugh Township, a portion of Young Township and Saltsburg in Indiana County and Loyalhanna Township in Westmoreland County attend the Saltsburg Elementary School (K-6) in Loyalhanna Township, and Saltsburg Middle-High School (7-12) in Conemaugh Township.

== Extracurriculars ==
The district offers a variety of clubs, activities and sports.

=== Athletics ===
Blairsville has 5 Heritage conference titles to Saltsburgs 0 in football. In 2014 Blairsville beat Saltsburg 55–7 to claim its first Heritage Conference Title in football in 9 years It was 41–0 at the half. Blairsville has also beat Saltsburg 18 straight time in football. Things changed toward the end of rivalry as Saltsburg won 3 of the last 4 meetings with Blairsville. Saltsburg was a D6 semifinalist in 2019. The district offers a variety of sports at the varsity level.A student wishing to participate in a sport not offered at their school can participate in the program at the other school. All teams compete in the Heritage Conference of the PIAA-District 6. (with PIAA classifications for 2008–2010)

	Blairsville	Saltsburg	Location
Baseball	AA		Blairsville
Boys' Basketball	AA	A	
Girls' Basketball	AA	A	
Cross Country	AA		Blairsville
Football	A	A	
Golf	Open competition		Blairsville
Softball	AA		Saltsburg
Track & Field	AA		Saltsburg
Volleyball	A		Blairsville
Wrestling	AA		Blairsville

=== District 6 championships ===
Football (since 1985)
Saltsburg: 1991

Baseball Blairsville: 2012 Girls' Basketball Blairsville: 2012 2015

Boys' basketball (since 1948)
Blairsville: 1993 (AA), 1994 (AA), 2005 (A), 2006 (A) 2015 A
Saltsburg: 2000, 2002, 2003

Total: Saltsburg:4 Blairsville:6 Heritage Conference Championships Football: Blairsville: 2002, 2003, 2004, 2005, 2014 Saltsburg: 0
