= United School District (Pennsylvania) =

School district in Pennsylvania

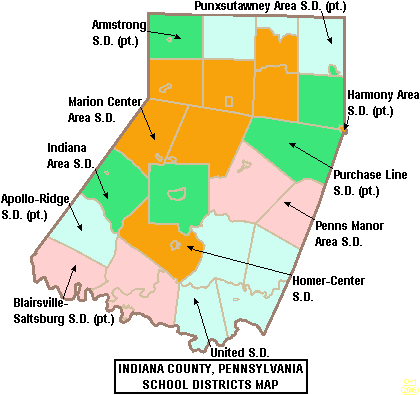
- Map of Indiana County showing school district zones

Address
- 10780 Route 56 Highway East Armagh, Indiana County, Pennsylvania, 15920; United States

District information
- Type: Public
- Superintendent: Richard Lucas

Students and staff
- District mascot: Lion
- Colors: Royal blue and white

Other information
- Website: www.unitedsd.net

United School District is a small, rural public school district headquartered in East Wheatfield Township, Indiana County, Pennsylvania, United States. The United School District encompasses approximately 131 square miles (340 km^{2}). The district serves the borough of Armagh and the townships of Brush Valley, Buffington, East Wheatfield, and West Wheatfield. According to 2000 federal census data, United School District served a resident population of 8,269. By 2010, the district's population declined to 7,988 people. The educational attainment levels for the school district population (25 years old and over) were 82.9% high school graduates and 10.9% college graduates. The district is one of the 500 public school districts of Pennsylvania.

According to the Pennsylvania Budget and Policy Center, 39.9% of the district's pupils lived at 185% or below the Federal Poverty Level as shown by their eligibility for the federal free or reduced price school meal programs in 2012. In 2009, the district residents' per capita income was $14,576, while the median family income was $35,455. In the Commonwealth, the median family income was $49,501 and the United States median family income was $49,445, in 2010. In Indiana County, the median household income was $40,225. By 2013, the median household income in the United States rose to $52,100.

United School District operates two schools: United Elementary School (Grades K–6) and United Junior/Senior High School (Grades 7–12), which are located on the same campus. The United Cyber Academy is for district students K–12. High school students may choose to attend Indiana County Technology Center for training in the construction and mechanical trades as well as other careers. The ARIN Intermediate Unit IU28 provides the district with a wide variety of services like specialized education for disabled students and hearing, background checks for employees, state mandated recognizing and reporting child abuse training, speech and visual disability services and professional development for staff and faculty.

== Extracurriculars ==
United School District offers a wide variety of clubs, activities and an extensive, publicly funded sports program. The district is a member of the Heritage Conference for sports.

=== Sports ===
The district funds:

Varsity

Boys

- Baseball - A
- Basketball- AA
- Cross country - A
- Football - A
- Golf - AA
- Soccer - A
- Track and field - AA
- Wrestling - AA

Girls

- Basketball - AA
- Cheer - AAAA
- Cross country - A
- Golf - A
- Soccer - A
- Softball - AA
- Track and field - AA
- Volleyball - A

Junior high school sports

Boys

- Basketball
- Football
- Track and field
- Wrestling

Girls

- Basketball
- Cheer
- Track and field
- Volleyball

According to PIAA directory July 2015
