= Cygnus NG-20 =

Early 2024 cargo spacecraft mission to ISS

NG-20
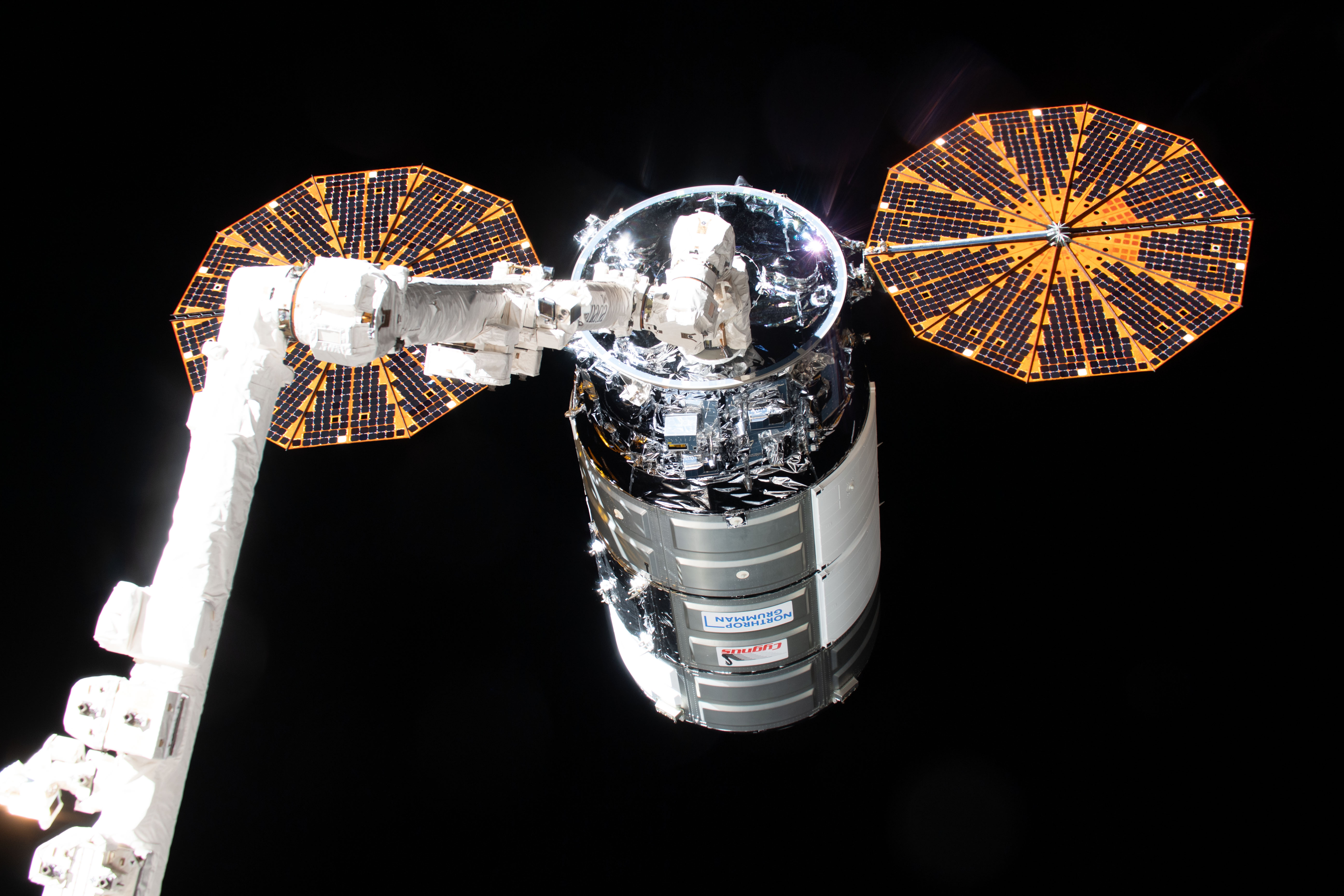
- Cygnus S.S. Patricia "Patty" Hilliard Robertson (NG-20) after arrival at the ISS
- Names: CRS NG-20
- Mission type: ISS resupply
- Operator: Northrop Grumman
- COSPAR ID: 2024-021A
- SATCAT no.: 58898
- Mission duration: 164 days, 21 hours and 53 minutes

Spacecraft properties
- Spacecraft: S.S. Patricia "Patty" Hilliard Robertson
- Spacecraft type: Enhanced Cygnus
- Manufacturer: Northrop Grumman; Thales Alenia Space

Start of mission
- Launch date: 30 January 2024, 17:07:15 UTC (12:07:15 pm EDT)
- Rocket: Falcon 9 Block 5 B1077-10
- Launch site: Cape Canaveral, SLC-40
- Contractor: SpaceX

End of mission
- Disposal: Deorbited
- Decay date: 13 July 2024, 15:00 UTC

Orbital parameters
- Reference system: Geocentric orbit
- Regime: Low Earth orbit
- Inclination: 51.66°

Berthing at the ISS
- Berthing port: Unity nadir
- RMS capture: 1 February 2024, 09:59 UTC
- Berthing date: 1 February 2024, 12:14 UTC
- Unberthing date: 12 July 2024, 08:00 UTC
- RMS release: 12 July 2024, 11:01 UTC
- Time berthed: 161 days, 22 hours and 47 minutes

Cargo
- Mass: 3,726 kg (8,214 lb)
- Pressurised: 3,712 kg (8,184 lb)
- Unpressurised: 14 kg (31 lb)
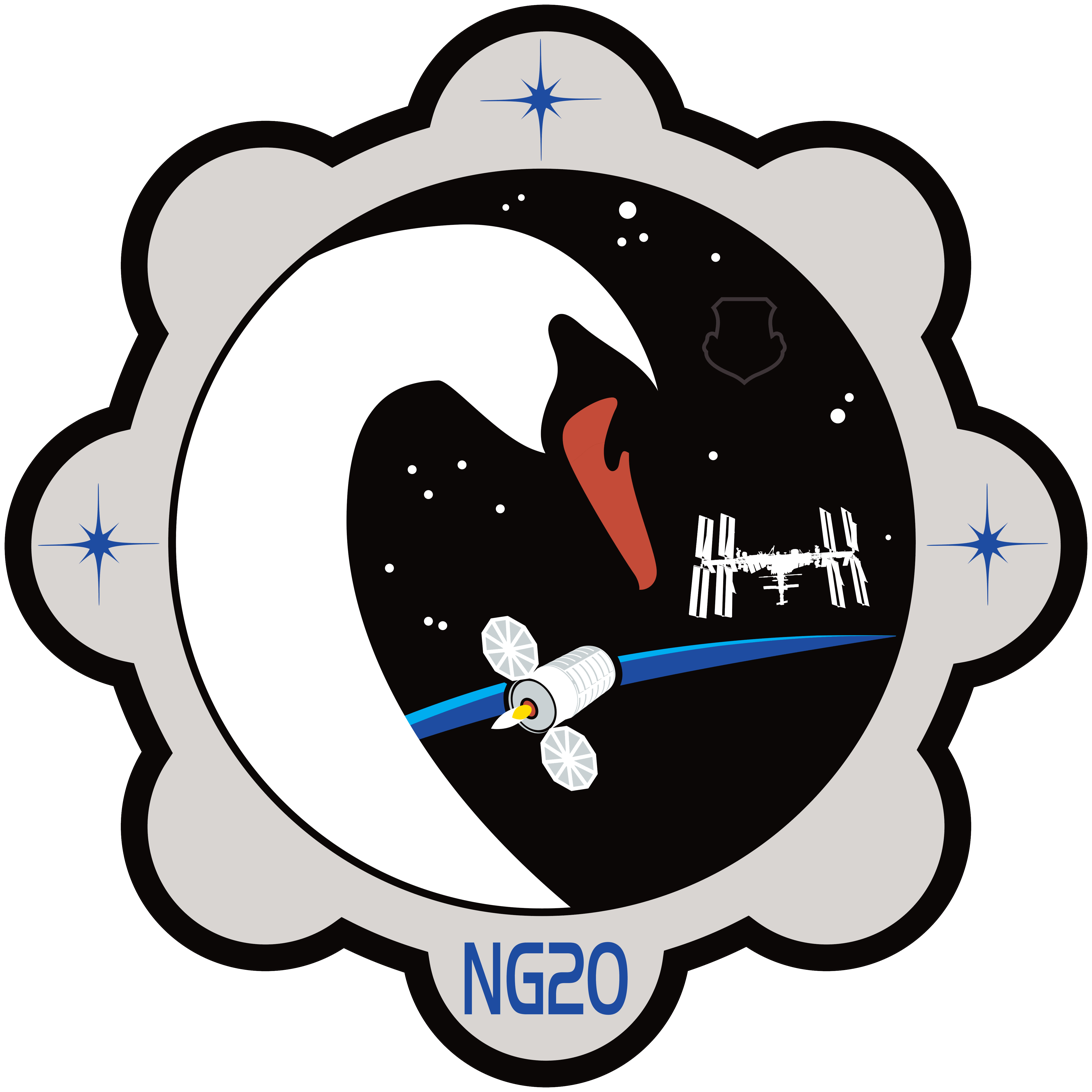
- Cygnus NG-20 mission patch Commercial Resupply Services Cygnus flights

NG-20 was the twentieth flight of the Cygnus, an expendable American cargo spacecraft used for International Space Station (ISS) logistics missions that launched on 30 January 2024 and was deorbited on 13 July 2024. It was operated by Northrop Grumman under a Commercial Resupply Services contract with NASA. The spacecraft was an Enhanced Cygnus, named the S.S. Patricia "Patty" Hilliard Robertson in honor of the NASA astronaut who died in a plane crash prior to being assigned to a crew to fly to the ISS.

NG-20 was the first launch of a Cygnus spacecraft after Northrop Grumman exhausted the supply of its Antares 230+ rocket. The Antares used a Russian-built engine and Ukrainian-built first stage, and production ceased after the Russian invasion of Ukraine. Northrup Grumman expects its next-generation Antares 300 rocket that does not depend on Ukrainian or Russian parts to be ready to fly NG-23. As an interim solution, Northrop Grumman contracted with its CRS competitor SpaceX to launch NG-20, 21 and 22 using its Falcon 9 Block 5 rocket. With the launch of NG-20, Cygnus became the only cargo freighter to launch on four different orbital launchers, that is, Antares rocket (100 series), Atlas V, Antares 200 series and Falcon 9. The rocket’s first stage, B1077, made its 10th flight on this mission.

== History ==
Cygnus was developed by Orbital Sciences Corporation, partially funded by NASA under the agency's Commercial Orbital Transportation Services program. To create Cygnus, Orbital paired the Multi-Purpose Logistics Module, built by Thales Alenia Space and previously used by the Space Shuttle for ISS logistics, with a service module based on Orbital's GEOStar, a satellite bus. The larger Enhanced Cygnus was introduced in 2015. Orbital Sciences was renamed Orbital ATK in 2015 and Northrop Grumman purchased Orbital in 2018 and has continued to operate Cygnus missions.

Cygnus NG-20 is the ninth Cygnus mission under the Commercial Resupply Services-2 contract.

Production and integration of Cygnus spacecraft were performed in Dulles, Virginia. The Cygnus service module is mated with the pressurized cargo module at the launch site, and mission operations are conducted from control centers in Dulles and in Houston, Texas.

== Spacecraft ==
The NG-20 spacecraft was named S.S. Patricia "Patty" Hilliard Robertson in memory of astronaut Patricia Robertson. This is the fifteenth flight of the Enhanced-sized Cygnus PCM.

== Manifest ==
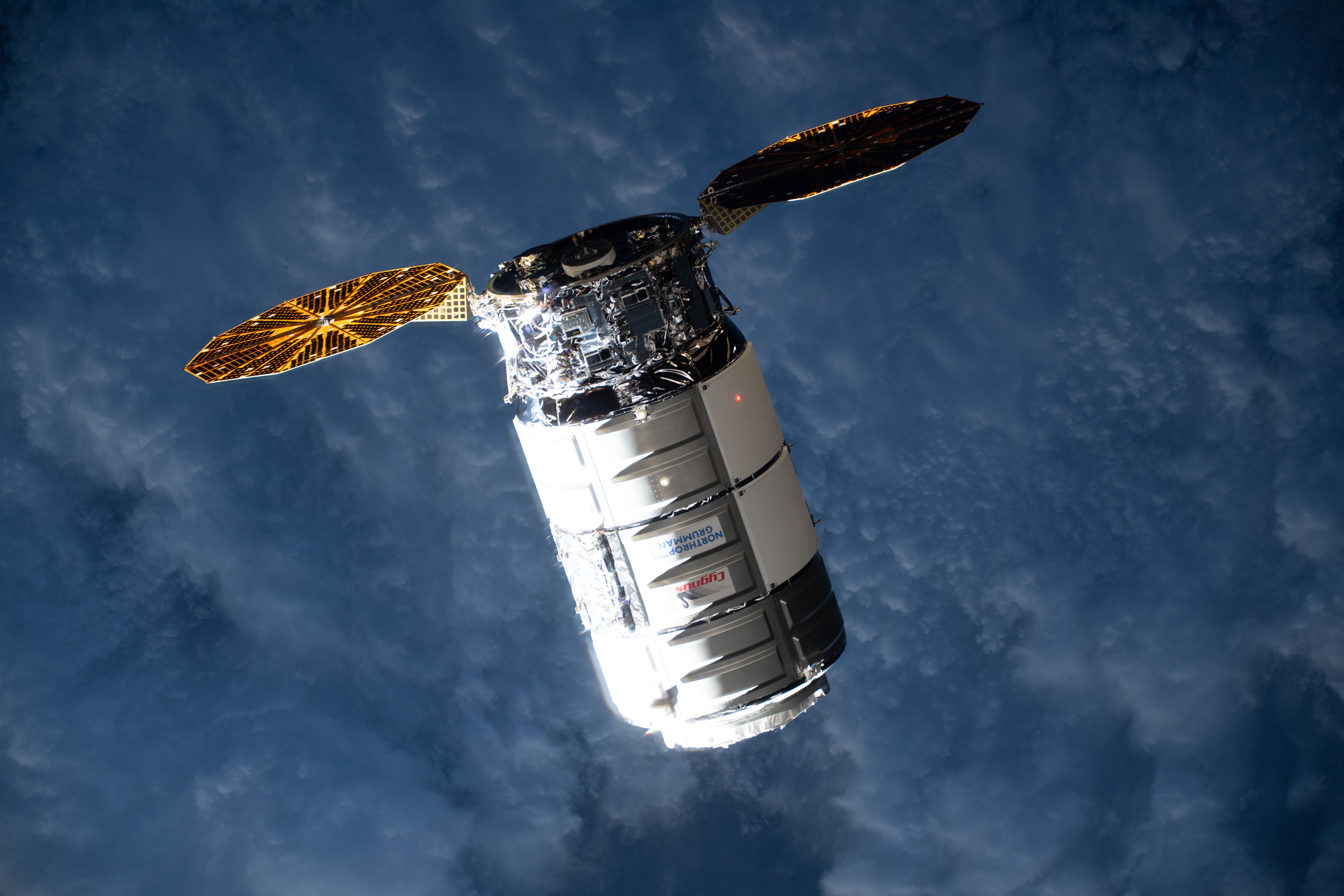
S.S. Patricia "Patty" Hilliard Robertson (NG-20) approaches the International Space Station on 1 February 2024

The Cygnus spacecraft was loaded with a total of 3,726 kilograms (8,214 lb) of cargo and supplies before its launch, including 3,712 kilograms (8,184 lb) of pressurised and 14 kilograms (31 lb) of unpressurised cargo.

The cargo manifest is broken down as follows:

- Crew supplies: 1,129 kg (2,489 lb)
- Science investigations: 1,369 kg (3,018 lb)
- Spacewalk equipment: 16 kg (35 lb)
- Vehicle hardware: 1,131 kg (2,493 lb)
- Computer resources: 67 kg (148 lb)

== Research ==
Scientific investigations traveling in the Cygnus spacecraft include tests of a 3D metal printer, semiconductor manufacturing, and thermal protection systems for re-entry to Earth's atmosphere.

=== 3D Printing in Space ===
An investigation from ESA (European Space Agency), Metal 3D Printer tests additive manufacturing or 3D printing of small metal parts in microgravity. This investigation provides us with an initial understanding of how such a printer behaves in space. A 3D printer can create many shapes, and we plan to print specimens, first to understand how printing in space may differ from printing on Earth and second to see what types of shapes we can print with this technology. In addition, this activity helps show how crew members can work safely and efficiently with printing metal parts in space.

Results could improve understanding of the functionality, performance, and operations of metal 3D printing in space, as well as the quality, strength, and characteristics of the printed parts. Resupply presents a challenge for future long-duration human missions. Crew members could use 3D printing to create parts for maintenance of equipment on future long-duration spaceflight and on the Moon or Mars, reducing the need to pack spare parts or to predict every tool or object that might be needed, saving time and money at launch.

Advances in metal 3D printing technology also could benefit potential applications on Earth, including manufacturing engines for the automotive, aeronautical, and maritime industries and creating shelters after natural disasters.

=== Semiconductor Manufacturing in Microgravity ===
Manufacturing of Semiconductors and Thin-Film Integrated Coatings (MSTIC) examines how microgravity affects thin films that have a wide range of uses. This technology could enable autonomous manufacturing to replace the many machines and processes currently used to make a wide range of semiconductors, potentially leading to the development of more efficient and higher-performing electrical devices.

Manufacturing semiconductor devices in microgravity also may improve their quality and reduce the materials, equipment, and labor required. On future long-duration missions, this technology could provide the capability to produce components and devices in space, reducing the need for resupply missions from Earth. The technology also has applications for devices that harvest energy and provide power on Earth.

=== Modeling Atmospheric Re-Entry ===
Scientists who conduct research on the space station often return their experiments to Earth for additional analysis and study. But the conditions that spacecraft experience during atmospheric reentry, including extreme heat, can have unintended effects on their contents. Thermal protection systems used to shield spacecraft and their contents are based on numerical models that often lack validation from actual flight, which can lead to significant overestimates in the size of system needed and take up valuable space and mass. Kentucky Re-entry Probe Experiment-2 (KREPE-2), part of an effort to improve thermal protection system technology, uses five capsules outfitted with different heat shield materials and a variety of sensors to obtain data on actual reentry conditions.

Building on the success of KREPE-1 launched on Cygnus NG-16, improved sensors are added to gather more measurements and improved the communication system to transmit more data. The capsules can be outfitted for other atmospheric re-entry experiments, supporting improvements in heat shielding for applications on Earth, such as protecting people and structures from wildfires.

=== Remote Robotic Surgery ===
Robotic Surgery Tech Demo tests the performance of a small robot that can be remotely controlled from Earth to perform surgical procedures. Researchers plan to compare procedures in microgravity and on Earth to evaluate the effects of microgravity and time delays between space and ground.

The robot uses two "hands" to grasp and cut rubber bands, which simulate surgical tissue and provide tension that is used to determine where and how to cut, according to Shane Farritor, chief technology officer at Virtual Incision Corp., developer of the investigation with the University of Nebraska.

Longer space missions increase the likelihood that crew members may need surgical procedures, whether simple stitches or an emergency appendectomy. Results from this investigation could support development of robotic systems to perform these procedures. In addition, the availability of a surgeon in rural areas of the country declined nearly a third between 2001 and 2019. Miniaturization and the ability to remotely control the robot help make surgery available anywhere and anytime on Earth.

NASA has sponsored research on miniature robots for more than 15 years. In 2006, remotely operated robots performed procedures in the underwater NASA's Extreme Environment Mission Operations (NEEMO) 9 mission. In 2014, a miniature surgical robot performed simulated surgical tasks on the zero-g parabolic airplane.

=== Growing Cartilage Tissue in Space ===
Compartment Cartilage Tissue Construct demonstrates two technologies, Janus Base Nano-Matrix and Janus Base Nanopiece. Nano-Matrix is an injectable material that provides a scaffold for formation of cartilage in microgravity, which can serve as a model for studying cartilage diseases. Nanopiece delivers an RNA (ribonucleic acid)-based therapy to combat diseases that cause cartilage degeneration.

Cartilage has a limited ability to self-repair and osteoarthritis is a leading cause of disability in older patients on Earth. Microgravity can trigger cartilage degeneration that mimics the progression of aging-related osteoarthritis but happens more quickly, so research in microgravity could lead to faster development of effective therapies. Results from this investigation could advance cartilage regeneration as a treatment for joint damage and diseases on Earth and contribute to development of ways to maintain cartilage health on future missions to the Moon and Mars.

=== HPE Spaceborne Computer payload ===
This mission also carried the third iteration of the HPE Spaceborne Computer, a commercial off-the-shelf (COTS) server system for high-performance computing (HPC), artificial intelligence (AI), and machine learning (ML) in space environments. Although Hewlett Packard Enterprise designates this hardware as "Spaceborne Computer-2"—emphasizing that it is the second-generation system deployed to the ISS—it is referred to informally as "SBC-3" in some NASA references, reflecting that it is the third mission iteration.

Compared with earlier deployments, the upgraded system included expanded GPU resources and storage capacity of up to 130 terabytes, the largest amount of data storage sent to orbit to date, enabling more advanced edge computing workloads such as medical imaging, natural language processing, and real-time analysis of spaceflight data.

== Mission ==
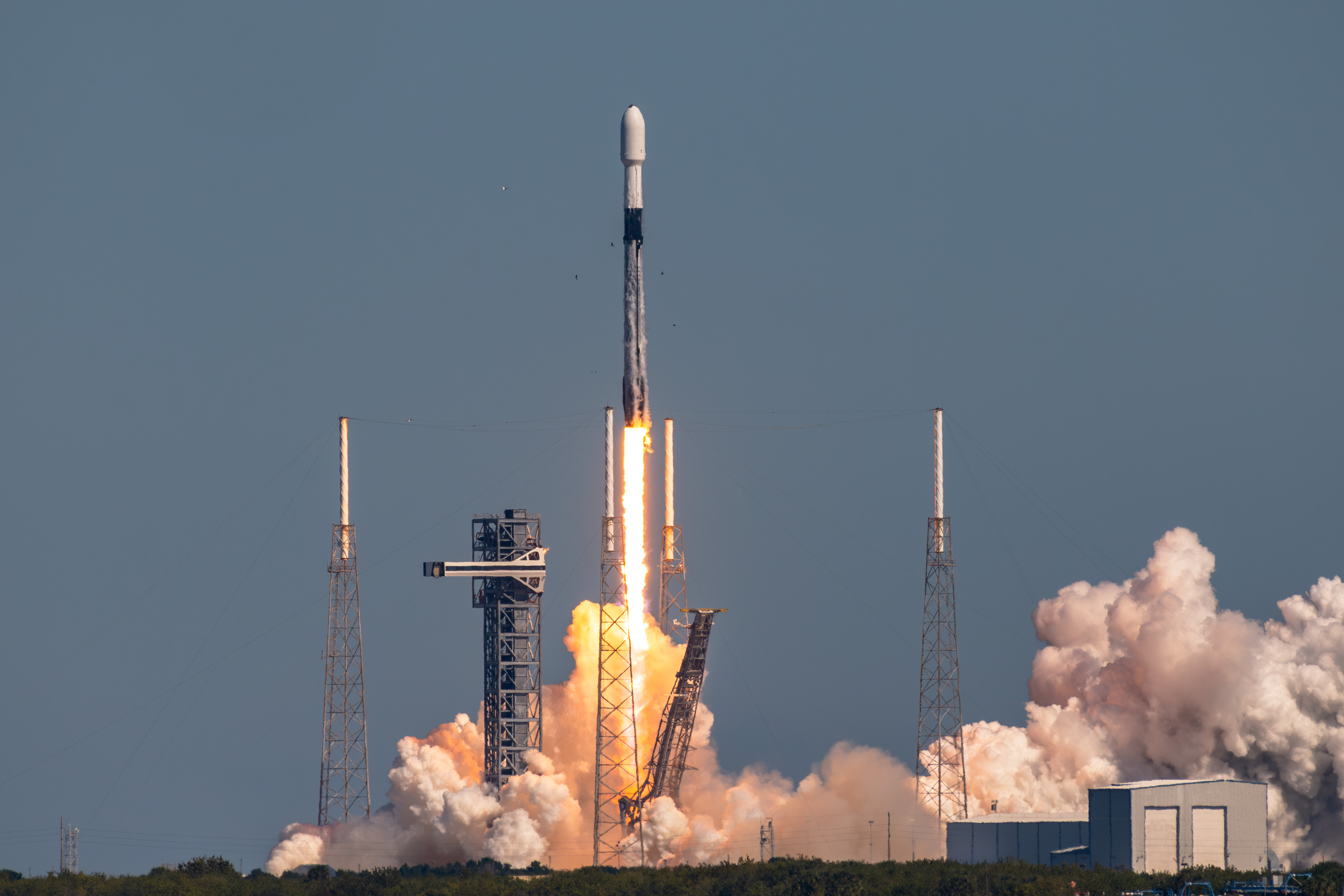
Launch of Cygnus NG-20

While most Cygnus missions have been launched atop Northrop Grumman's Antares rocket from the Mid-Atlantic Regional Spaceport, production was suspended after the Russian invasion of Ukraine, as the first stage of the Antares was produced in Ukraine and the engines in Russia. Northrop Grumman is working to shift production of the first stage and its engines to Firefly Aerospace, with a first flight scheduled for August 2025.

To fill the gap, Northrop Grumman contracted with CRS competitor SpaceX to launch up to three Cygnus missions atop Falcon 9 Block 5 rockets. To accommodate the Cygnus, SpaceX modified their payload fairing to add a 5 ft × 4 ft (1.5 m × 1.2 m) side hatch to load late cargo onto the spacecraft via mobile cleanroom. The mission used Falcon 9 first-stage booster #1077 on its tenth mission.

The mission launched from SLC-40 at Cape Canaveral Space Force Station on 30 January 2024, 17:07:15 UTC. Cygnus docked with the International Space Station on 1 February 2024.

== See also ==
- Uncrewed spaceflights to the International Space Station
