= United High School =

United High School may refer to:

- Beaumont United High School in Beaumont, Texas
- Saginaw United High School in Saginaw, Michigan
- United High School (Laredo, Texas) in Laredo, Texas
- United High School (Ohio) in Hanoverton, Ohio — sometimes referred to as "United Local High School"
- United Junior/Senior High School (Pennsylvania) in Armagh, Pennsylvania
- United Senior High School (Illinois) in Monmouth, Illinois — sometimes still labeled as "United Junior/Senior High School"
- United Township High School in East Moline, Illinois
