= Patricia Robertson =

American astronaut (1963-2001)

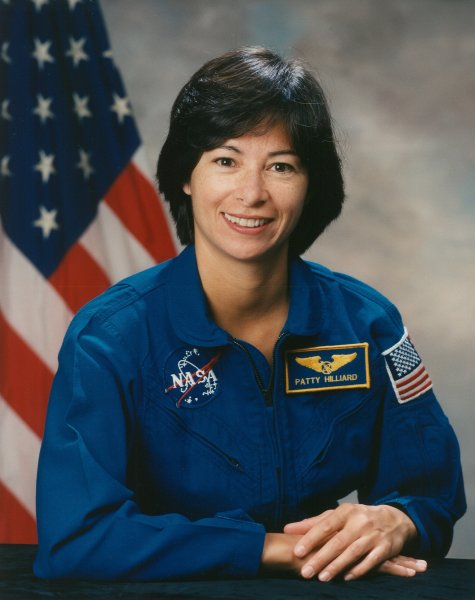
- Born: Patricia Consolatrix Hilliard; March 12, 1963; Indiana, Pennsylvania, U.S.
- Died: May 24, 2001 (aged 38); Houston, Texas, U.S.
- Education: Indiana University of Pennsylvania (BS); Medical College of Pennsylvania (MD)
- Space career

NASA astronaut
- Selection: NASA Group 17 (1998)

Patricia Consolatrix Hilliard Robertson (March 12, 1963 – May 24, 2001) was an American physician and a NASA astronaut. She died in a plane crash prior to being assigned to a crew to fly to the International Space Station.

== Biography ==
She was born in Indiana, Pennsylvania, to Ilse Hilliard and the late Harold Hilliard of Homer City. She was married to Scott Robertson.

== Education ==
She graduated from Homer-Center High School, Homer City, Pennsylvania, in 1980. She received a Bachelor of Science degree in biology from Indiana University of Pennsylvania in 1985, and a medical degree from the Medical College of Pennsylvania in 1989. She completed a three-year residency in family medicine in 1992 and was certified by the American Board of Family Medicine in the same year. She completed a two-year fellowship in space medicine at the University of Texas Medical Branch and NASA Johnson Space Center in 1997, which included the Aerospace Medicine Primary Course at Brooks Air Force Base.

== Medical career ==
After completing her training in Family Medicine in 1992, Robertson joined a group practice, Elk Valley Medical Center in Girard, Pennsylvania. She was on the staff of Saint Vincent Medical Center in Erie, Pennsylvania, for three years where she served as the clinical coordinator for medical student training, and also provided training and supervision for resident physicians. In 1995, Robertson was one of two fellows selected to study aerospace medicine at the University of Texas Medical Branch, Galveston, and at the Johnson Space Center, Houston. While enrolled as a Space Medicine Fellow, Robertson completed a research project where she studied eccentric and concentric resistive exercise countermeasures for space flight. Robertson also served as a member of the faculty at UTMB in the departments of Family Medicine and Emergency Medicine. In 1997, Robertson joined the Flight Medicine Clinic at Johnson Space Center, where she provided health care for astronauts and their families, and served as Chairman of the Bone, Muscle, and Exercise Integrated Product Team.

Robertson was a multiengine rated flight instructor and avid aerobatic pilot. In her free time, she enjoyed flight instructing, aerobatics, and flying with her husband. She had accumulated more than 1,500 hours of flight time.

== NASA career ==
Selected by NASA in June 1998, Robertson reported for training in August 1998. Her Astronaut Candidate training included orientation briefings and tours, numerous scientific and technical briefings, intensive instruction in Shuttle and International Space Station systems, physiological training and ground school to prepare for T-38 flight training, as well as learning water and wilderness survival techniques. After completing training, she served as the office representative for the Crew Healthcare System (CHeCS), and as Crew Support Astronaut (CSA) for the ISS Expedition 2 crew. At the time of her death, she was assigned as a crew support astronaut for the Expedition 2 crew. In that role, she served as an interface between the Mission Control Center Flight Control Team and the Astronaut Office on issues related to the Expedition 2 crew and, along with other astronauts, coordinated activities on the ground for the three crew members in space.

== Death ==
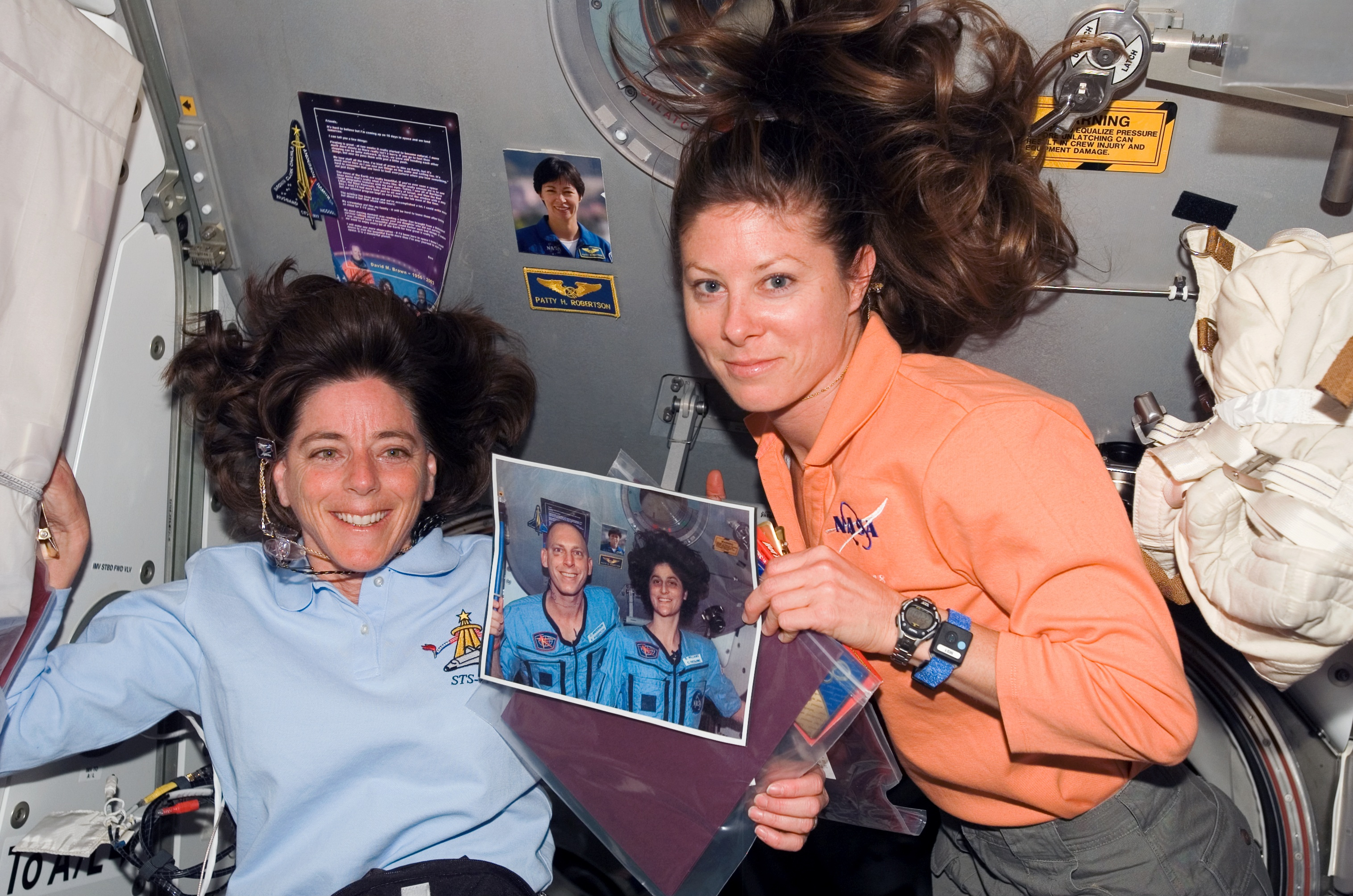
Robertson's Astronaut Group 17 classmates Barbara Morgan and Tracy Caldwell pose in a tribute photo onboard ISS during STS-118 with a photo of Robertson on the wall behind them with her NASA nametag. Adjacent is a tribute to the STS-107 crew who perished 19 months after Robertson. Caldwell holds a photo of fellow astronauts Clay Anderson and Sunita Williams.

Robertson died May 24, 2001, in Houston from burn injuries sustained in the crash of a private plane at Wolfe Air Park, Manvel, Texas, on May 22, 2001; she was 38 years old. Robertson had been providing instruction to a private pilot when control of the aircraft was lost. She was living at Homer City and she was scheduled to work with the crew who were going to fly to the International Space Station in the following year.

The Patricia Hilliard Robertson Center for Aviation Medicine at the Indiana Regional Medical Center was named in her honor in 2009.

== Organizations ==
- Aerospace Medicine Association
- American Association of Family Practice
- Experimental Aircraft Association
- International Aerobatic Club
- Aircraft Owners and Pilots Association

== Honors and awards ==
- NASA Performance Award
- Young Investigator Award Finalist (Aerospace Medicine Association)
- IUP Distinguished Alumni Award, 2000

== Legacy ==
- Patricia Hilliard Robertson Center for Aviation Medicine at the Indiana Regional Medical Center
- Northrop Grumman Cygnus Spacecraft S.S. Patricia “Patty” Hilliard Robertson launched on January 30, 2024 for Cygnus NG-20 mission
