= Homer City, Pennsylvania =

Borough in Pennsylvania, US

- Borough
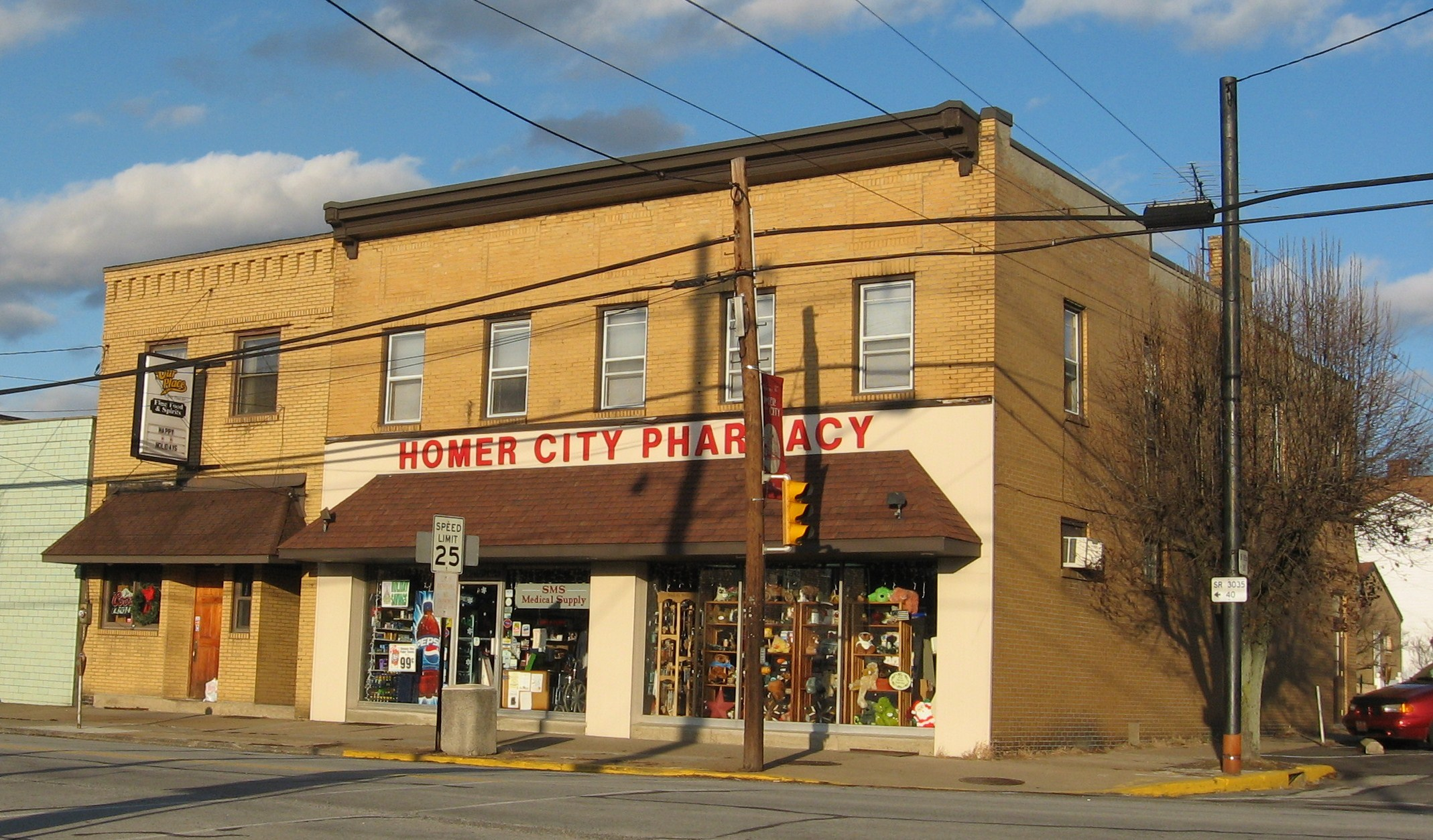
- Businesses on Main Street

- Location in Indiana County, Pennsylvania

- Location of Pennsylvania in the United States
- Coordinates: 40°32′23″N 79°09′33″W
- Country: United States
- State: Pennsylvania
- County: Indiana

Area
  - Total: 0.56 sq mi (1.45 km^{2})
  - Land: 0.55 sq mi (1.43 km^{2})
  - Water: 0.0077 sq mi (0.02 km^{2})
- Elevation: 1,375 ft (419 m)

Population (2020)
  - Total: 1,730
  - Density: 3,132.8/sq mi (1,209.57/km^{2})
- Time zone: UTC-5 (EST)
  - Summer (DST): UTC-4 (EDT)
- ZIP code: 15748
- Area codes: 724, 878
- FIPS code: 42-35408
- Website: www.homercity.com

Homer City is a borough in Indiana County, Pennsylvania, United States. The population was 1,746 at the 2020 census. Homer City is located in the Indiana metro area. The community was named for the famous Greek poet Homer by founder William Wilson in 1854. It was incorporated as a borough on Thursday, September 26, 1872.

== History ==
The two treaties of Fort Stanwix (of 1768 and, after American independence, of 1784) secured the westward expansion of Pennsylvania into the region where the Borough of Homer City is now located, on land inhabited by the six Indian nations. With white settlement these new territories were initially organized as part of existing counties in eastern and central Pennsylvania. White settlers were few in the eighteenth century and encountering Indians still very much a part of daily life. Any degree of stability and safety came only after the Battle of Fallen Timbers (1794). Indiana County was carved out of Westmoreland and Lycoming counties in 1803 and divided into three townships: Wheatfield, Armstrong, and Mahoning. The confluence of Two Lick and Yellow creeks (present-day Homer City) was a contender for the seat of government for the new county, but instead the "extraordinary overtures" of George Clymer, a local landowner and a signer of the Declaration of Independence, saw the county seat situated instead in what would become the Borough of Indiana. Center Township - the unincorporated area surrounding present-day Homer City - was created from a portion of Armstrong Township in 1807, its landscape dotted with larger and smaller family homesteads (farms) and an increasing number of mills and trading posts.

Parts of Center Township were settled early on by Scots-Irish Presbyterians as in other parts of Indiana County, but Methodist families of English and Welsh descent came to dominate the Homer City area, and they remained prominent in its civic and commercial life well into the twentieth century. William Wilson laid out the village of Homer in 1854 naming it after the Classical Greek poet. For several years, however, its post office was designated Phillips Mill (or Mills on some maps), a name derived from that of early settler Armour Phillips Sr. When the village became a borough in 1872 - with the consolidation and annexation of neighboring parcels - more and more it was referred to as Homer City.

With a post office and a stop (later station) on the Pennsylvania Railroad line, the Borough of Homer City developed along the lines of many small towns in the late nineteenth and early twentieth centuries. It traditionally offered goods and services including merchants, a bank, medical professionals, craftsmen, and schools not only to borough residents, but also to inhabitants of surrounding, rural Center Township. The township's development took a different path. Enduring settlements beyond family homesteads awaited the establishment of villages (company towns) by coal companies in the early twentieth century. More often than not they bore the names of the companies, their owners, families and company executives (e.g., Waterman, Graceton, Luciusboro) as in other parts of Indiana County.

The general prosperity of the post-World War II era saw the greater affluence of Homer City and Center Township residents, better (wider, paved) roads and increased automobile ownership leading to the expansion of residential areas at the edges of Homer City and into the once rural farmland of Center Township - in the form of sub-developments and individually owned homesteads (non-agricultural lots). These trends have continued with newer developments such as Red Maple Drive and Mystic Rock on Route 56 in Center Township and the housing developments outside the village of Lucerne (Mines).

The Homer-Center School District has boundaries coterminous with the Borough of Homer City and surrounding Center Township. This fact, combined with the use of "Homer City" as a mailing address and telephone exchange, has often blurred the boundaries of the Borough and Center Township even though they remain distinct political entities. Residences and businesses beyond the confines of the Borough (and even beyond those of Center Township) can possess "Homer City" mailing addresses and telephone numbers. Examples include the Homer City Generating Station and Non-Lethal Technologies, both of which are referenced in this article.

A novella called The Roving Red Rangers or Laura Lamar of the Susquehanna by Charles Asbury Robinson, was set in the Homer City area. It was published by the author in 1902. It has often been erroneously understood as a work of non-fiction and given rise to mistaken notions about local history, especially when the name "Laura Lamar" derived from a character in this novella was suggested and adopted as the name of the local school district in the 1952.

== Contemporary Homer City ==
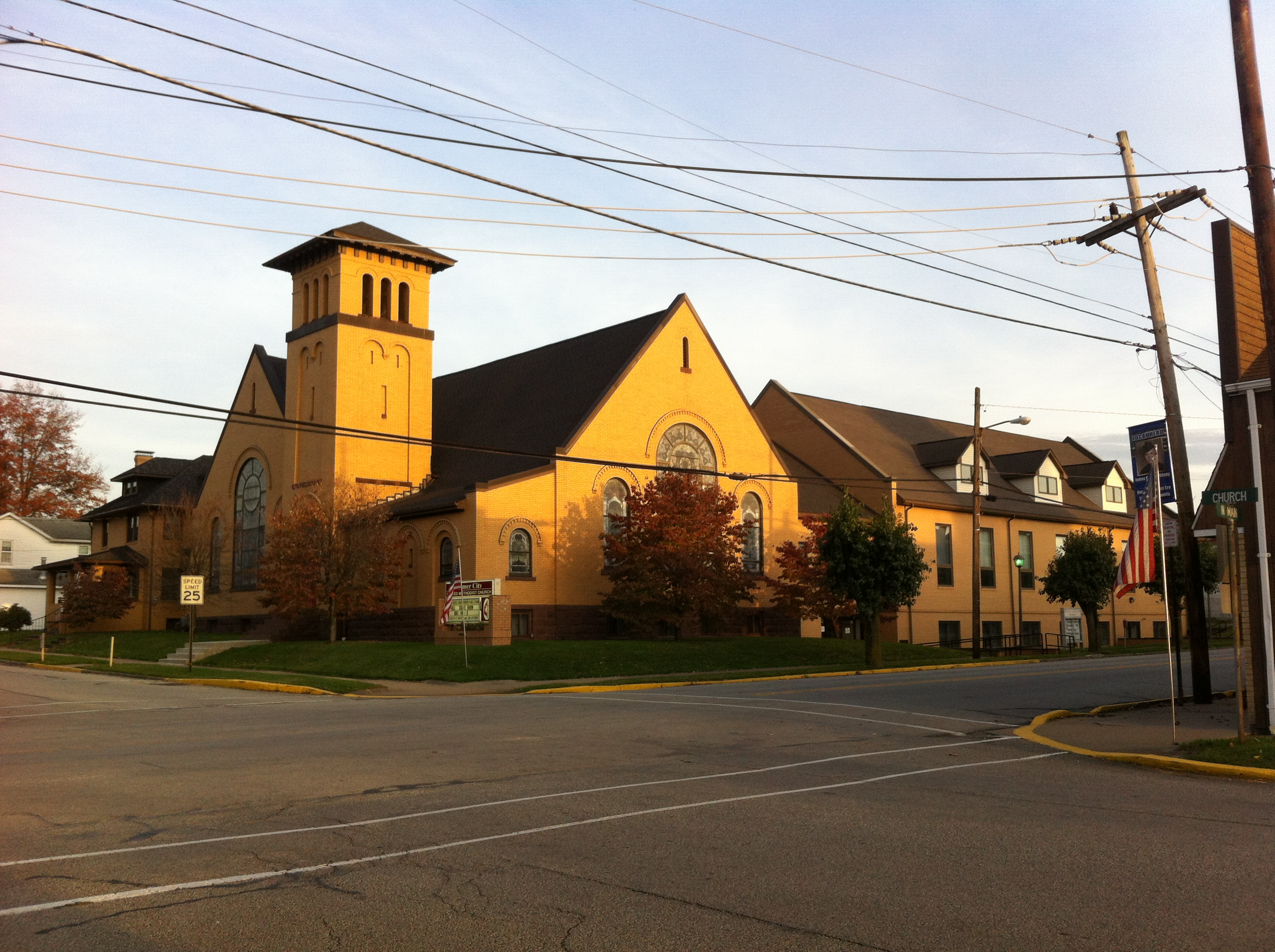
View of a church on Main Street, 2014

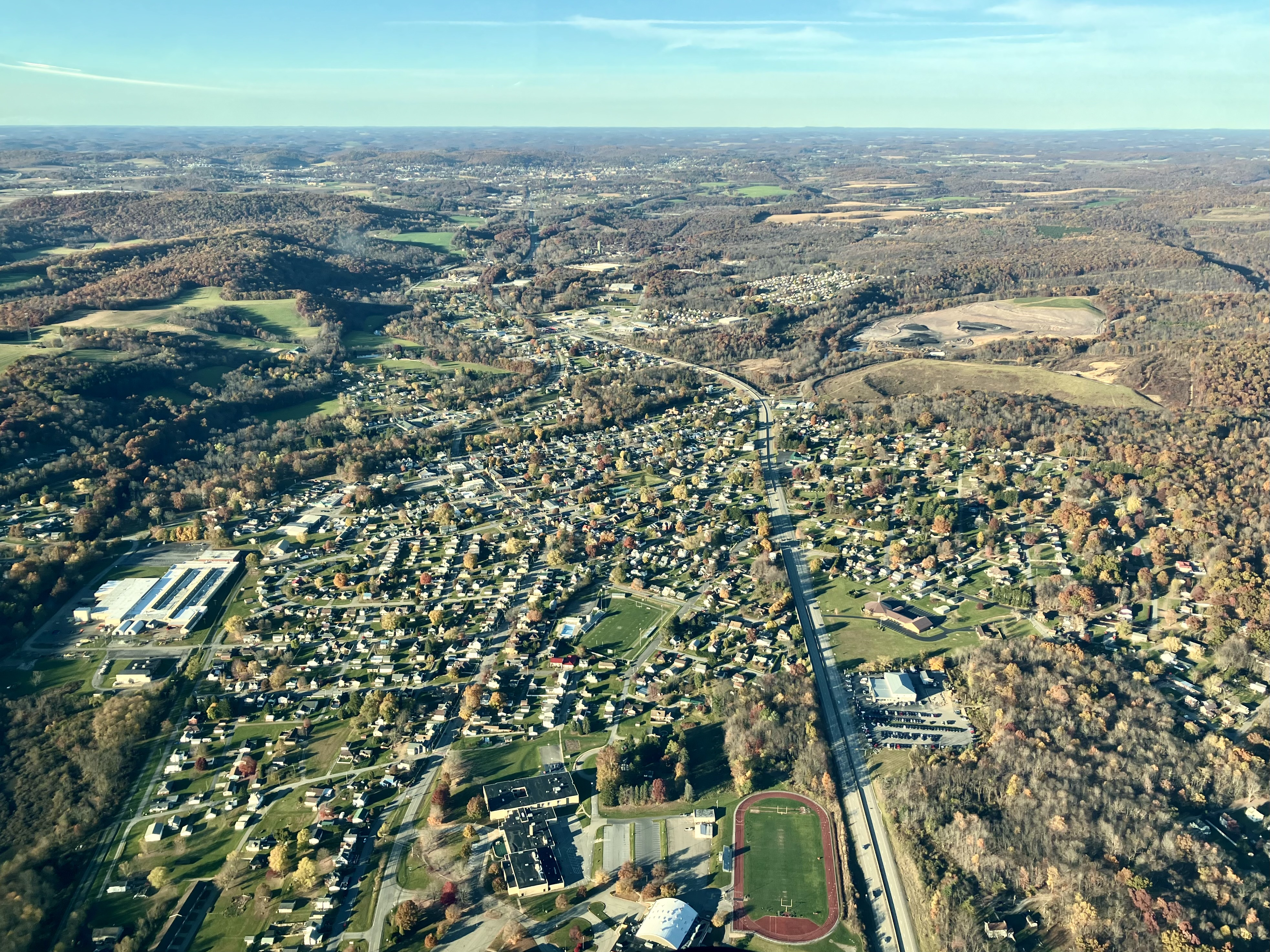
Homer City from the air, October 2024

Businesses within the borough that provide goods and services to residents include a bank, a grocery store, a dollar store, restaurants, hair salons, physicians' offices, a distillery and other service-oriented businesses. The community is served by the Borough of Homer City Police and the Homer City Volunteer Fire Department. Among the oldest existing structures in Homer City are its churches including Homer City United Methodist Church, Homer City United Presbyterian Church, Hope Evangelical Lutheran Church, Holy Protection (a.k.a. St. Mary's) Byzantine Catholic Church and Saints Peter and Paul Orthodox Church.

The Homer City Generating Station, located in Center Township, once had the tallest chimney in the United States and the third tallest in the world. It was demolished by implosion on the morning of March 22, 2025.

The borough's local radio station is 1160 WCCS "The Voice of Indiana County".

Homer City gained national and international prominence in the early twentieth century as the location of the Prairie State Incubator Company - particularly after its products appeared on display at various exhibitions and trade shows across the country. After its production facilities were twice destroyed by fire, the company built a new state-of-the-art "fire-proof" facility but ceased production shortly thereafter. In 1920 the same building became the new home of industrial toolmaker, the Syntron Company. (Its name derived from an early product known as the SYNchronous elecTRONic hammer). It was, for many years, the single largest employer within the boundaries of the Borough of Homer City. It continued to operate, after a merger, as a division of Chicago-based FMC Corporation until June 2007. Over the last several decades Homer City Generating Station, located in Center Township, has also made national news many times. Non-Lethal Technologies, Inc. has a Homer City address, even though its physical location is near Aultman and Jacksonville. The company manufactures CS Gas that has been used to suppress protests in Bahrain, Turkey and Greece. Each CS canister produced by the company shows the address of its manufacturer

== General information ==
- ZIP code: 15748
- Area Code: 724
- Local Phone Exchanges: 479 915

== Education ==
The borough is a part of the Homer-Center School District, with the schools being located just south of the borough line.

== Notable people ==
- Steve Demeter (born 1935) - professional baseball player for Detroit Tigers and Cleveland Indians from 1959 to 1960.
- Ralph McConnaughey (1889–1966) - professional baseball player in 1914.
- Patricia (Hilliard) Robertson (1963–2001) - NASA Astronaut class of 1998.
- Dave Reed (born 1978) - Former Pennsylvania State Representative for the 62nd District and Former Majority Leader
- Samuel, Ebenezer; Vacchiano, Ralph (January 14, 2016). "Giants will name Ben McAdoo as new head coach". nydailynews.com. * Ben McAdoo - professional football coach - Former Head Coach of the New York Giants

== Events and Points of Interest ==
=== Hoodlebug trail ===
The Hoodlebug Trail traverses the Borough of Homer City, leading north through Center Township to White Township and the outskirts of Indiana Borough and south through Center Township in the direction of Black Lick. This Rails-to-Trails initiative follows the route of the former Pennsylvania Railroad line and provides recreational opportunities for walkers, runners, and cyclists. A recent project by Indiana County Parks and Trails placed helpful signage along the Hoodlebug Trail and information kiosks describing historical and natural sights located on or adjacent to the trail. The name derives from the hoodlebug, or doodlebug, a self-propelled railroad car that ran from Indiana to Blairsville on the Pennsylvania Railroad line and provided local passenger and mail service. It ceased operations in 1940. Naming the trail after this piece of local history was suggested by Homer City resident Robert McAnulty.

=== Floodway Park ===
Floodway Park, bounded by North Main Street, Station Street, the Center Township boundary, and Yellow Creek, is a multi-use recreational site maintained by Homer-Center Parks and Recreation. It offers visitors two softball fields with bleachers, a pavilion with electricity, a walking trail, restroom facilities, parking for events and serves as a "trailhead" for the Hoodlebug Trail. Its name speaks volumes about the history of this section of the borough and the origins of the park itself. It is located on a natural flood plain adjacent to Yellow Creek Park, and it represents a different approach to land use: it can be developed and used on a regular basis, but in ways that do not profoundly inhibit the flood plain nor will structures built on the plain be ruined should severe flooding occur. Prior to the Flood of '77 the area was an extension of the Main Street/Downtown Business District. C. S. Kunkle Lumber, Sesti's Restaurant, the Colonial Hotel, and the original location of Luther Ford Sales at one point all stood where the park is now found. (A residential neighborhood was located behind the businesses, too. On the opposite side of the creek the Empire - later Homer City - Theater dating to 1913 was another prominent structure.) The entire area was decimated by the Flood of 1977 with clean-up and restoration of the landscape lasting into the 1980s and the dedication of the park in the early 1990s.

=== Caboose-Museum Site ===
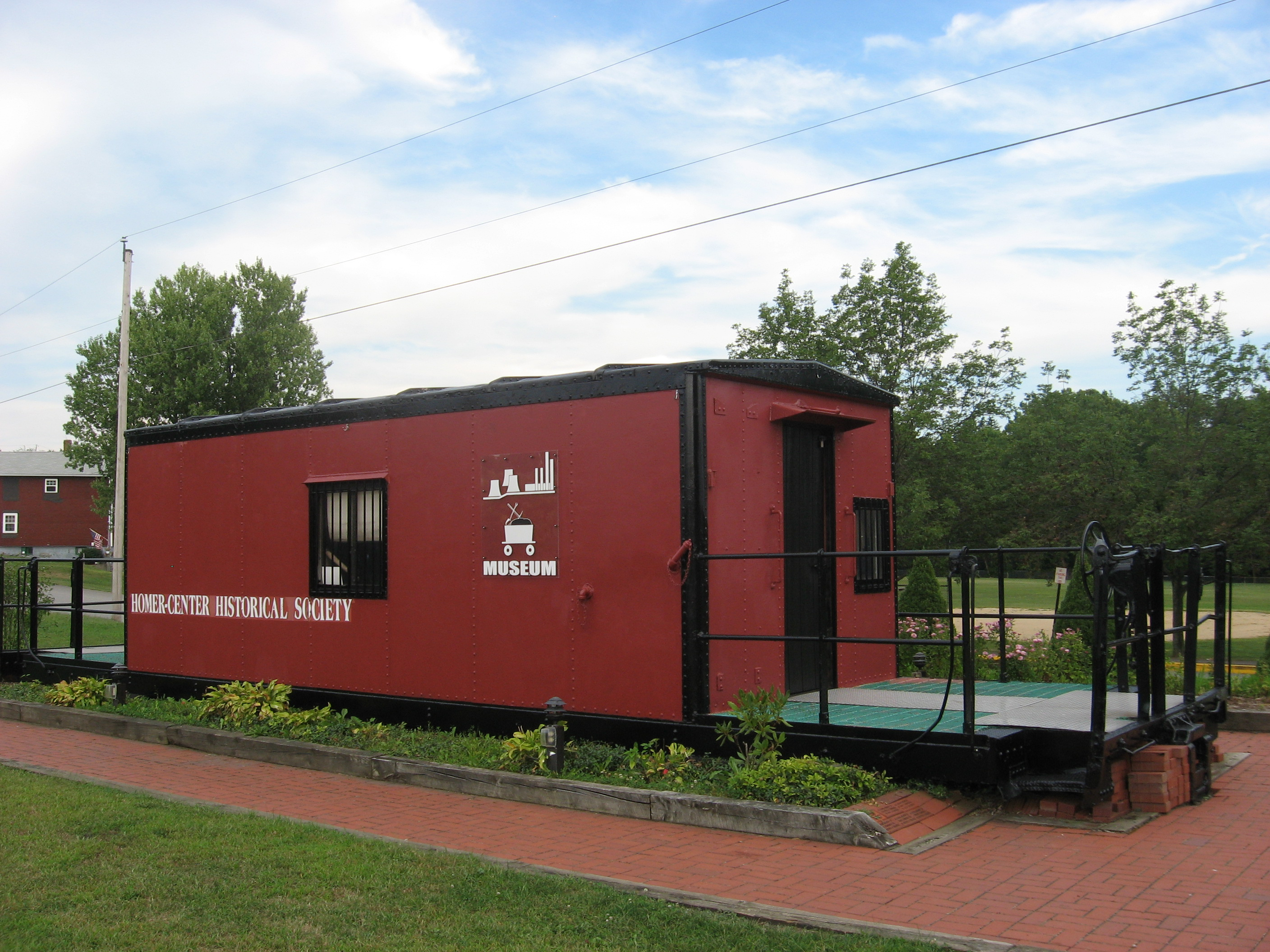
The museum site

The Caboose-Museum Site (240 N. Main St), situated on a narrow strip of land between Floodway Park and the Hoodlebug Trail, is owned and operated by the Homer-Center Historical Society. The original museum is a re-purposed, vintage Pennsylvania Railroad caboose that houses artifacts, documents and research materials related to the history of the Borough of Homer City and Center Township. The adjacent Annex (a mini-barn) is used for larger displays and storage while the grounds themselves also display additional artifacts and a commemorative walkway made up of donated engraved bricks. The Caboose-Museum is open to visitors on Saturdays and Sundays from Memorial Day through Labor day and by appointment. The Historical Society partnered with the Borough of Homer City in its "Local Hero" Banner Program for Veterans. Over 140 2' x 5' banners honoring the military service of local individuals and donated by family and friends are mounted on utility poles along Main Street and adjacent side streets from Memorial Day through Veterans' Day.

=== The Hoodlebug FallFest ===
The Hoodlebug Festival, organized by a committee of the Homer City Area Business Association, is a festival held in early September. It hosts a variety of games and activities for local residents. Originally named SummerFest when it was held in July, the festival's name comes from the nickname of a passenger train service that was discontinued in the 1940s and its namesake, the Hoodlebug Trail.

=== Homer City Auctions ===
Every Spring, an equipment sale is hosted in Homer City; along with weekly livestock auctions, and a fall feeder (calf) sale.

== Geography ==
Homer City is located at 40°32′23″N 79°09′33″W. It is situated 6 miles (10 km) from Indiana, 30 miles (48 km) from Greensburg, 25 miles (40 km) from Johnstown, and 50 miles (80 km) from Pittsburgh.

According to the United States Census Bureau, the borough has a total area of 0.6 square miles (1.6 km^{2}), all land.

== Demographics ==
Historical population
Census	Pop.	Note	%±
1880	381		—
1890	505		32.5%
1900	570		12.9%
1910	985		72.8%
1920	1,802		82.9%
1930	2,004		11.2%
1940	2,078		3.7%
1950	2,372		14.1%
1960	2,471		4.2%
1970	2,465		−0.2%
1980	2,248		−8.8%
1990	1,809		−19.5%
2000	1,844		1.9%
2010	1,707		−7.4%
2020	1,730		1.3%
2021 (est.)	1,738	▲	0.5%

As of the census of 2000, there were 1,844 people, 805 households, and 511 families residing in the borough. The population density was 3,298.3 inhabitants per square mile (1,273.5/km^{2}). There were 869 housing units at an average density of 1,554.4 per square mile (600.2/km^{2}). The racial makeup of the borough was 99.40% White, 0.22% African American, 0.05% Asian, and 0.33% from two or more races. Hispanic or Latino of any race were 0.33% of the population.

There were 869 households, out of which 26.1% had children under the age of 18 living with them, 49.4% were married couples living together, 10.7% had a female householder with no husband present, and 36.5% were non-families. 32.5% of all households were made up of individuals, and 18.4% had someone living alone who was 65 years of age or older. The average household size was 2.28 and the average family size was 2.91.

In the borough the population was spread out, with 22.1% under the age of 18, 6.3% from 18 to 24, 27.0% from 25 to 44, 23.8% from 45 to 64, and 20.8% who were 65 years of age or older. The median age was 42 years. For every 100 females there were 87.0 males. For every 100 females age 18 and over, there were 79.1 males.

The median income for a household in the borough was $30,815, and the median income for a family was $39,375. Males had a median income of $31,607 versus $21,250 for females. The per capita income for the borough was $16,293. About 8.4% of families and 10.8% of the population were below the poverty line, including 11.8% of those under age 18 and 7.2% of those age 65 or over.

Major ancestry groups reported by Homer City residents would include: 18% German, 17% Italian, 11% Irish, 9% Polish, 7% Slovak, 7% English, 5% Dutch, 3% Scots-Irish, 3% Scotch, 2% Hungarian, 1% Swedish, 1% Ukrainian, 1% French (except Basque), 1% Pennsylvania German, 1% Croatian, 1% Welsh, 1% Russian, 1% Norwegian, 1% Slovene, and 1% Slavic.

== Elected officials ==
Homer City Borough's elected officials consist of a seven-member council and a mayor. The council of Homer City meets the first Tuesday of every month for general business.

Mayor: Arlene Wanatosky

Borough Council members: Joseph Iezzi Sr.(President), Matthew Black (Vice President), Avi Handaran, Denise Liggett, Kenneth "Cal" Cecconi, Christine Worcester, and Robert Walbeck.
