= Indiana County Technology Center =

Coordinates: 40.64186°N 79.12698°W

- White Township, Indiana County, Pennsylvania; Indiana, Pennsylvania

Information
- School type: Public Vocational Education School
- Oversight: Joint Operating Committee
- Director: Michael McDermott
- Principal: Michael Worthington
- Grades: 10-12
- Schedule type: Part-Time
- Nickname: ICTC

Indiana County Technology Center is a technical school in Indiana County, Pennsylvania. The center serves high school and adult students.

== Secondary program ==
ICTC serves high school students from the county's eight Senor High Schools, who spend one-half of the school day at ICTC and the other half at their home school:

=== Sending high schools ===
- Blairsville Middle-High School
- Saltsburg Middle-High School
- Homer-Center Junior/Senior High School
- Indiana Area Senior High School
- Marion Center Area High School
- Penns Manor Area Junior/Senior High School
- Purchase Line Junior/Senior High School
- United Junior/Senior High School

=== Secondary programs ===
There are 14 program areas at ICTC in five clusters:

- Automotive Repair
- Carpentry
- Masonry
- Culinary Arts
- Health Occupations
- Graphic Design
- Cosmetology (including a separate adult cosmetology class)
- And more

=== Career development programs ===
Career Development programs at ICTC include:

- Cooperative Learning - The student leans hand-on skills while being employed in the community, and is advised by school faculty
- Work-based Learning -Students in this program have job shadowing opportunities and possible unpaid internships

=== Secondary clubs ===
There are a variety of clubs available to the student at ICTC,

- Student Challenge Program
- National Technical Honor Society
- PA Builders Association - Student Chapter
- Skills USA

== Adult education ==
There are programs for adult learners in 31 different programs, as per demand from Commonwealth of Pennsylvania and are tailored to the student's need.
