= River Valley Middle–High School =

Coordinates: 40.44922°N 79.21955°W

Location
- 100 School Lane; Burrell Township, Indiana County, Pennsylvania; Blairsvlle, Pennsylvania 15717

Information
- School type: Public Middle/High School
- School district: River Valley School District
- NCES District ID: 4203750
- Superintendent: Regina Geasey (Interim)
- NCES School ID: 420375004706 (HS); 420375002317 (MS)
- Principal: Micheal Leasure
- Faculty: 30
- Grades: 6-12
- Student to teacher ratio: 15:1
- Colors: Black and Teal
- Athletics conference: Heritage Conference
- Mascot: Panther
- Nickname: RVSD
- Rival: Homer Center High School
- Feeder schools: Blairsville Elementary School, Saltsburg Elementary School
- Feeder to: River Valley Jr/Sr High School
- Graduates: Blairsville
- Website: https://hs.rivervalleysd.org/

River Valley Middle–High School (formerly Blairsville) is one of two secondary schools in the River Valley School District. The campus is shared with the one of the two elementary schools in Blairsville Elementary and Saltsburg Elementary (located on the Saltsburg campus), Blairsville Elementary School, River Valley Middle School, River Valley High School, and the District office are located at the intersection of US Routes 119 and 22 in Burrell Township. River Valley Steam Academy and Saltsburg Elementary are located in Saltsburg off of PA-286. The campus is 36-acres in size and is in close proximity to Higher-level institutions in the area.

== About the School ==
River Valley has a very diverse selection of core academic classes range from general to advanced placement and include college in the classroom and dual enrollment opportunities. A total of six Advanced Placement courses are offered: AP Chemistry, AP World History, AP United States History, AP Calculus AB, AP Physics C: Mechanics, and AP English Literature. Typically, approximately eighty percent of graduates complete courses that prepare them for entry to a university or technical school. Eight percent graduate with credits from the Indiana County Technology Center, which prepare them for immediate employment(out of the county), continuing education at Westmoreland County Community College or military service. Blairsville High School River Valley Middle–High School is a technologically advanced school with three computer labs, a portable wireless lab, a computer assisted drafting and design lab, a computer assisted mathematics lab, and a local area network with independent servers and Internet access on all computers.Blairsville Middle School

== Alma Mater ==
The former Alma Mater for Blairsville High School:
Hail, Blairsville High, Glorious Alma Mater.
You who guide the steps of youth
With your torch of faith and freedom.
Blairsville High to thee we sing.
Accept the heartfelt praise we sing.
Hail, Blairsville High, Glorious Alma Mater.
Loyal friends we met through you.
Loving memories linger ever.
Blairsville High to thee we sing.
Accept the thankful praise we sing

== Graduation Requirements ==
In order to graduate from RVMHS, a student must obtain 23.2 Credits of coursework as well as complete a graduation project.

=== Coursework Breakdown ===
Coursework is as follows

| Subject Area | #/Credits | Notes |
|---|---|---|
| English | 4.0 | |
| Social Studies | *4 | ICTC Students only need 3 Credits |
| Math | 3.0 | |
| Science | 3.0 | |
| Physical Education | Varies | 1 Course each year |
| Health | 0.5 | |
| Arts/Humanities | 2.0 | |

== Vocational Education ==
Students in grades 10-12 have the opportunity to attend the Indiana County Technology Center in White Township for part of their school day if they wish to obtain training in a specific area that the ICTC offers.

== Athletics ==
Blairsville is in PIAA District VI:

- Baseball - Class AA
- Basketball - Class AA
- Cross Country - Class AA
- Football - Class A
- Golf - Class AAAA
- Softball - Class AA
- Track and Field - Class AA
- Volleyball - Class AA
- Wrestling - Class AA

== Grades 7-8 Sports ==
These are non-conference sports and include:

- Basketball
- Football
- Volleyball
- Wrestling
