= Homer-Center School District =

School district in Pennsylvania, U.S.

Address
- 65 Wildcat Lane Homer City, Pennsylvania, 15748-1602; United States
- Coordinates: 40.53276°N 79.16024°W

District information
- Type: Public
- Motto: Where Everybody is Somebody!
- Grades: K-12
- Superintendent: Ralph Cecere
- Accreditation: MSACS
- Schools: 2
- NCES District ID: 4213290

Students and staff
- Enrollment: 964
- District mascot: Wildcats
- Colors: Black and White

Other information
- Website: homercenter.org

Homer-Center School District is a public school district in the Commonwealth of Pennsylvania. The district serves Homer City Borough and Center Township. The district campus is located just south of the Homer City/Center Township border along South Main Street and adjacent to U.S. Route 119. The campus is entirely located within Center Township, but shares a direct border with Homer City Borough.

The district operates two school buildings: Homer-Center Elementary (grades K-6) and Homer-Center Junior/Senior High School (grades 7–12) with a total enrollment of 964 students, grades K-12. The district's high school building currently accommodates 491 students, while the elementary has an enrollment of 473 students.

Homer-Center's athletic teams - known as the Wildcats - compete in the Heritage Conference, which resides in the PIAA-District VI. The district does not offer athletics programs at the elementary level, however students can participate in programs offered by the Homer City Area Athletic Booster Club (HCAABC). HCAABC-sponsored teams are nicknamed the Homer City Bears.

== Schools ==
Homer-Center School District
- 45 Wildcat Lane; Homer City, Pennsylvania; 15748-1602; United States

Information
- Motto: Where everybody is somebody
- Established: 1976
- NCES School ID: 421329006797
- Principal: Michael A. Stofa
- Faculty: 32.50 (on full-time equivalent (FTE) basis)
- Grades: K-12
- Enrollment: 469 (2009-2010)
  - Kindergarten: 69
  - Grade 1: 76
  - Grade 2: 68
  - Grade 3: 61
  - Grade 4: 71
  - Grade 5: 66
  - Grade 6: 58
- Student to teacher ratio: 15.8
- Colors: Black and White
- Mascot: Wildcats (HCAABC-sponsored teams are known as the Homer City Bears)
- Website: www.homercenter.org/hcelem/index.htm

== Homer-Center Elementary School ==
The Homer-Center Elementary School serves grades K-6. It is located on Wildcat Lane, just north of the high school building. The elementary building also contains the district administrative offices. The elementary school received two out of a possible five stars from SchoolDigger.com.

State School ID: 6797

The school is ranked 988th out of 1755 elementary schools in Pennsylvania and is ranked fifth out of the 12 elementary schools in Indiana County.

=== Demographics ===
The average grade size is 67.6 students. The student/teacher ratio is 15.8 students per teacher. 217 out of 473 students (46%) are eligible for discounted/free lunch. 137 are eligible for free lunch and 80 are eligible for a reduced-price lunch. There are 257 (54.3%) males in the elementary and 216 (45.7%) females; 459 students (97%) are Caucasian/White, (2%) African American, and (1%) other.

=== Sports ===
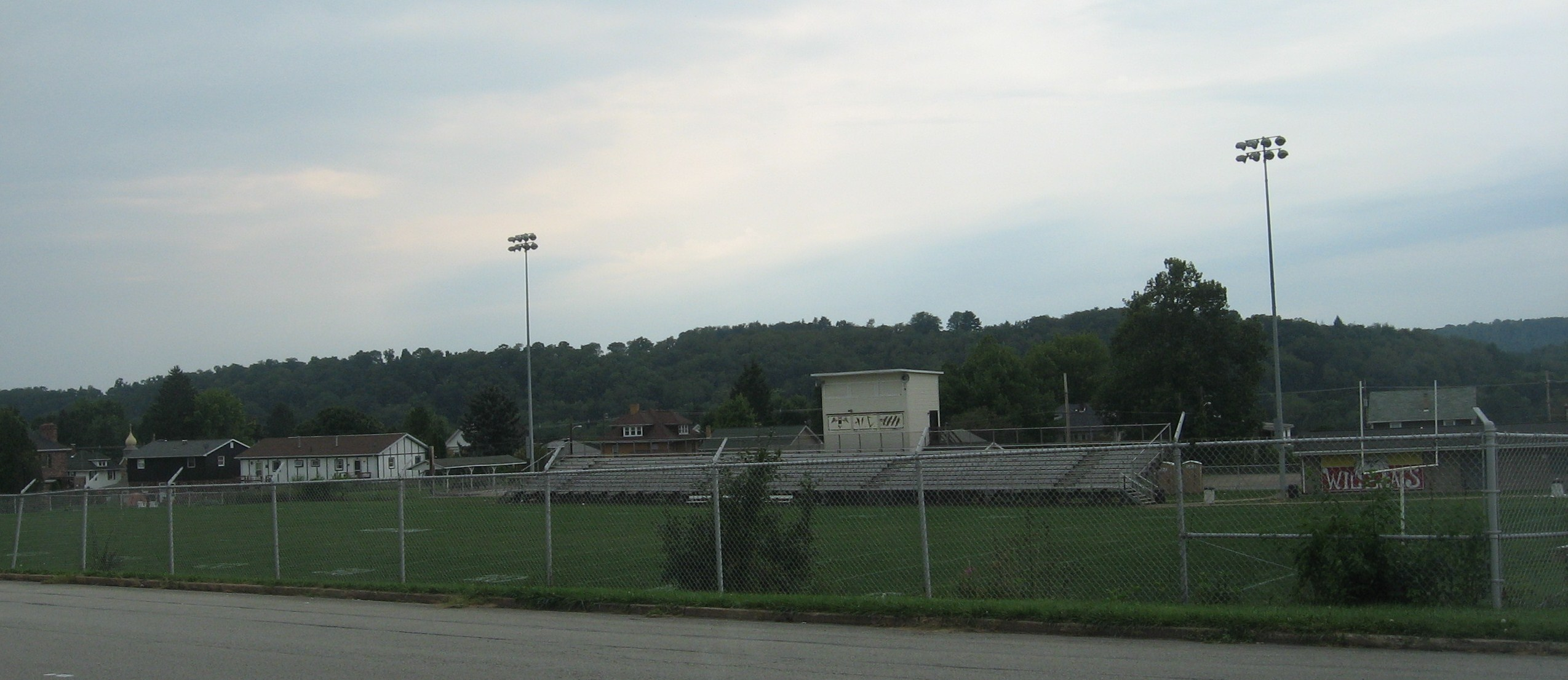
Memorial Field, home of Homer-Center athletics.

Elementary-level athletics teams are operated by the Homer City Area Athletic Booster Club (HCAABC), a local non-profit organization. The HCAABC sponsors football, baseball, softball, and basketball teams are nicknamed the "Homer City Bears."

=== Extracurricular activities ===
- Band: Grades 4-6
- Chorus: Grades 5-6
- Art Club: Grade 6
- Breakfast Book Club: Grades 5-6
- Art Helpers: Grades 4-6

== Legal issues ==
=== Combs v. Homer Ctr. Sch. Dist., 468 F. Supp. 2d 738 (W.D. Pa. 2006) ===
Parents who elected to home-school their children filed suit alleging that the defendant Pennsylvania school district in charge of administering and enforcing Pennsylvania's compulsory school attendance laws infringed upon their sincerely held religious beliefs that education is a “religion,” and that the state has no authority to regulate home education programs by religiously motivated homeschoolers. The parents alleged that the state homeschooling act ceded too much control over their children's religious education to the state in requiring them to submit an affidavit outlining their educational objectives to the defendants at the beginning of the school year and by requiring them to submit an additional log and portfolio containing samples of their children's work for discretionary administrative review and approval. In granting the defendants’ motion for summary judgment, the federal district court held that the statute, either on its face or as applied, did not violate the First Amendment Free Exercise Clause or the Pennsylvania Religious Freedom Protection Act. The state's homeschooling requirements did not place a burden, let alone a substantial one, on the parents’ freedom to practice their religion. Any negligible impact on the free exercise of religion was outweighed by the state's compelling interest in crafting home education programs to satisfy compulsory education laws and ensure that children were receiving an adequate education.

This decision was immediately appealed to the United States Court of Appeals for the Third Circuit where lawyers for Homer-Center School District presented oral arguments against the homeschooling families in November 2007.
