= United Junior/Senior High School (Pennsylvania) =

Coordinates: 40.4660°N 79.0453°W

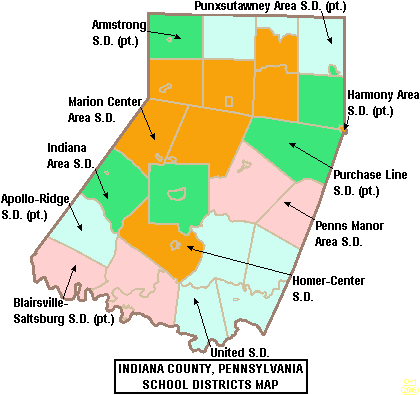

Location
- 10780 Route 56 Highway East; Armagh, Indiana County, Pennsylvania 15920; United States of America

Information
- Type: Public
- School district: United School District
- Principal: Michael Worthington
- Grades: 7-12
- Enrollment: 524 pupils (2014)
- Language: English
- Colors: Royal Blue and White
- Athletics conference: PIAA District 6 Heritage Conference
- Mascot: Lions
- Newspaper: Blue and White Star
- Communities served: Armagh
- Feeder schools: United Elementary School
- Website: United Junior/Senior High School

United Junior Senior High School is a small, rural public secondary school located in East Wheatfield Township, Pennsylvania, United States. The school serves the borough of Armagh and the townships of Brush Valley, Buffington, East Wheatfield, and West Wheatfield. It is the sole junior senior high school operated by the United School District. The building is located on the same campus as the sole elementary school in the district. The United Cyber Academy is for district students K-12. High school students may choose to attend Indiana County Technology Center for training in the construction and mechanical trades as well as other careers. The ARIntermediate Unit IU28 provides the district with a wide variety of services like specialized education for disabled students and hearing, background checks for employees, state mandated recognizing and reporting child abuse training, speech and visual disability services and professional development for staff and faculty.

In 2014, United Junior Senior High School enrollment was reported as 524 pupils in 7th through 12th grades. The school employed 47 teachers.

== Extracurriculars ==
The United School District offers a wide variety of clubs, activities and an extensive, publicly funded sports program.

=== Clubs ===
There are several Clubs available to the student at United:

- Art
- Bible
- Environmental
- Future Business Leaders of America (FBLA)
- Junior High Environmental
- Library
- Middle School Student Council
- National Honor Society
- Yearbook
- Robotics
- Science
- Senior High Student Council
- Tri-M Music Honor Society
- United Quiz Bowl

=== Athletics ===
The school provides:

Varsity

Boys

- Baseball - A
- Basketball- AA
- Cross Country - A
- Football - A
- Golf - AA
- Soccer - A
- Track and Field - AA
- Wrestling - AA

Girls

- Basketball - AA
- Cheerleading - AAAA
- Cross Country - A
- Golf - A
- Soccer (Fall) - A
- Softball - AA
- Track and Field - AA
- Volleyball - A

Junior High School Sports

Boys

- Basketball
- Football
- Track and Field
- Wrestling

Girls

- Basketball
- Cheerleading
- Track and Field
- Volleyball

According to PIAA directory July 2015
