= List of school districts in Pennsylvania =

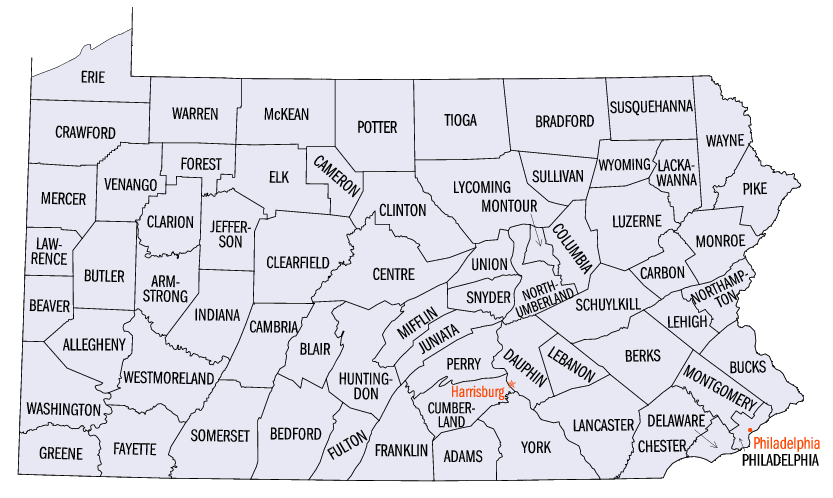
Pennsylvania's 67 counties

This is a list of school districts in the Commonwealth of Pennsylvania, a U.S. state.

The article for each Pennsylvania county with more than one school district includes a map showing all public school districts in the county.

Circa the late 1960s the number of school districts was 2,277. The state government had passed laws encouraging these districts to merge with one another, so the figure fell to 669, and then 501, in the 1970s and then in 1981. There are approximately 500 public school districts in Pennsylvania as of 2023.

School districts and community colleges are counted as separate governments by the U.S. Census Bureau. The state has no school systems that are dependent on another layer of government.

== Classification ==
School districts are classified by Pennsylvania state law based on the number of people living within the district boundaries:

- First Class (population over 1,000,000; Philadelphia City School District is the only district in this class)
- First Class A (population between 250,000 and 999,999; Pittsburgh Public Schools is the only district in this class)
- Second Class (population between 30,000 and 249,999)
- Third Class (population between 5,000 and 29,999)
- Fourth Class (population under 4,999)

However, if the school district's population moves between population groups, the school district's classification does not change until the Pennsylvania Secretary of Education certifies the new class. If the Secretary does not change the classification, then a school district's class remains in its current state regardless of the community's population.

== Intermediate Units ==
In Pennsylvania, each school district is serviced by one of 29 intermediate units, which help support the educational needs and functions of the districts.

== Intermediate Unit 1 (IU 1) ==
=== Fayette County ===
- Albert Gallatin Area School District (Third Class)
- Brownsville Area School District (Third Class; also extends into Washington County)
- Connellsville Area School District (Second Class)
- Frazier School District (Third Class)
- Laurel Highlands School District (Third Class)
- Uniontown Area School District (Third Class)

=== Greene County ===
- Carmichaels Area School District (Third Class)
- Central Greene School District (Third Class)
- Jefferson-Morgan School District (Third Class)
- Southeastern Greene School District (Third Class)
- West Greene School District (Third Class)

=== Washington County ===
- Avella Area School District (Fourth Class)
- Bentworth School District (Third Class)
- Bethlehem-Center School District (Third Class)
- Burgettstown Area School District (Third Class)
- California Area School District (Third Class)
- Canon-McMillan School District (Third Class)
- Charleroi School District (Third Class)
- Chartiers-Houston School District (Third Class)
- Fort Cherry School District (Third Class; also extends into Allegheny County)
- McGuffey School District (Third Class)
- Peters Township School District (Third Class)
- Ringgold School District (Second Class)
- Trinity Area School District (Third Class)
- Washington School District (Third Class)

== Pittsburgh-Mt. Oliver IU 2 ==
=== Allegheny County ===
- Pittsburgh Public Schools (First Class A)

== Allegheny IU 3 ==
=== Allegheny County ===
- Allegheny Valley School District (Third Class)
- Avonworth School District (Third Class)
- Baldwin-Whitehall School District (Second Class)
- Bethel Park School District (Second Class)
- Brentwood Borough School District (Third Class)
- Carlynton School District (Third Class)
- Chartiers Valley School District (Second Class)
- Clairton City School District (Third Class)
- Cornell School District (Third Class)
- Deer Lakes School District (Third Class)
- Duquesne City School District (Third Class)
- East Allegheny School District (Third Class)
- Elizabeth Forward School District (Third Class)
- Fox Chapel Area School District (Second Class)
- Gateway School District (Second Class)
- Hampton Township School District (Third Class)
- Highlands School District (Third Class)
- Keystone Oaks School District (Second Class)
- McKeesport Area School District (Second Class)
- Montour School District (Third Class)
- Moon Area School District (Third Class)
- Mt. Lebanon School District (Second Class)
- North Allegheny School District (Second Class)
- North Hills School District (Second Class)
- Northgate School District (Third Class)
- Penn Hills School District (Second Class)
- Pine-Richland School District (Third Class)
- Plum Borough School District (Third Class)
- Quaker Valley School District (Third Class)
- Riverview School District (Third Class)
- Shaler Area School District (Second Class)
- South Allegheny School District (Third Class)
- South Fayette Township School District (Third Class)
- South Park School District (Third Class)
- Steel Valley School District (Third Class)
- Sto-Rox School District (Third Class)
- Upper St. Clair School District (Third Class)
- West Allegheny School District (Third Class)
- West Jefferson Hills School District (Third Class)
- West Mifflin Area School District (Third Class)
- Wilkinsburg Borough School District (Third Class)
- Woodland Hills School District (Second Class)

== Midwestern IU 4 ==
=== Butler County ===
- Butler Area School District (Second Class)
- Karns City Area School District (Third Class; also extends into Armstrong and Clarion Counties)
- Knoch School District (Third Class)
- Mars Area School District (Third Class)
- Moniteau School District (Third Class)
- Seneca Valley School District (Third Class)
- Slippery Rock Area School District (Third Class)

=== Lawrence County ===
- Ellwood City Area School District (Third Class; also extends into Beaver County)
- Laurel School District (Third Class)
- Mohawk Area School District (Third Class)
- Neshannock Township School District (Third Class)
- New Castle Area School District (Second Class)
- Shenango Area School District (Second Class)
- Union Area School District (Third Class)
- Wilmington Area School District (Third Class; also extends into Mercer County)

=== Mercer County ===
- Commodore Perry School District (Fourth Class)
- Farrell Area School District (Third Class)
- Greenville Area School District (Third Class)
- Grove City Area School District (Third Class)
- Hermitage School District (Third Class)
- Jamestown Area School District (Fourth Class; also extends into Crawford County)
- Lakeview School District (Third Class)
- Mercer Area School District (Third Class)
- Reynolds School District (Third Class)
- Sharon City School District (Third Class)
- Sharpsville Area School District (Third Class)
- West Middlesex Area School District (Third Class)

== Northwest Tri-County IU 5 ==
=== Crawford County ===
- Conneaut School District (Third Class)
- Crawford Central School District (Second Class; also extends into Mercer County)
- Penncrest School District (Third Class; also extends into Venango County)

=== Erie County ===
- Corry Area School District (Third Class; also extends into Crawford and Warren Counties)
- Erie City School District (Second Class)
- Fairview School District (Third Class)
- Fort LeBoeuf School District (Third Class)
- General McLane School District (Third Class)
- Girard School District (Third Class)
- Harbor Creek School District (Third Class)
- Iroquois School District (Third Class)
- Millcreek Township School District (Second Class)
- North East School District (Third Class)
- Northwestern School District (Third Class)
- Union City Area School District (Third Class; also extends into Crawford County)
- Wattsburg Area School District (Third Class)

=== Warren County ===
- Warren County School District (Second Class)

== Riverview IU 6 ==
=== Clarion County ===
- Allegheny-Clarion Valley School District (Third Class; also extends into Armstrong, Butler and Venango Counties)
- Clarion Area School District (Third Class)
- Clarion-Limestone Area School District (Third Class; also extends into Jefferson County)
- Keystone School District (Third Class)
- North Clarion County School District (Fourth Class)
- Redbank Valley School District (Third Class; also extends into Armstrong County)
- Union School District (Third Class)

=== Clearfield County ===
- DuBois Area School District (Third Class; also extends into Jefferson County)

=== Forest County ===
- Forest Area School District (Third Class; also extends into Elk and Venango Counties)

=== Jefferson County ===
- Brockway Area School District (Third Class; also extends into Elk County)
- Brookville Area School District (Third Class)
- Punxsutawney Area School District (Third Class; also extends into Indiana County)

=== Venango County ===
- Cranberry Area School District (Third Class)
- Franklin Area School District (Third Class)
- Oil City Area School District (Third Class)
- Titusville Area School District (Third Class; also extends into Crawford and Warren Counties)
- Valley Grove School District (Third Class)

== Westmoreland IU 7 ==
=== Westmoreland County ===
- Belle Vernon Area School District (Third Class; also extends into Fayette County)
- Burrell School District (Third Class)
- Derry Area School District (Third Class)
- Franklin Regional School District (Third Class)
- Greater Latrobe School District (Second Class)
- Greensburg-Salem School District (Third Class)
- Hempfield Area School District (Second Class)
- Jeannette City School District (Third Class)
- Kiski Area School District (Third Class; also extends into Armstrong County)
- Ligonier Valley School District (Third Class)
- Monessen City School District (Third Class)
- Mount Pleasant Area School District (Third Class)
- New Kensington–Arnold School District (Third Class)
- Norwin School District (Second Class; also extends into Allegheny County)
- Penn-Trafford School District (Third Class; also extends into Allegheny County)
- Southmoreland School District (Third Class; also extends into Fayette County)
- Yough School District (Third Class)

== Appalachia IU 8 ==
=== Bedford County ===
- Bedford Area School District (Third Class)
- Chestnut Ridge School District (Third Class)
- Everett Area School District (Third Class)
- Northern Bedford County School District (Fourth Class)
- Tussey Mountain School District (Third Class; also extends into Huntingdon County)

=== Blair County ===
- Altoona Area School District (Second Class)
- Bellwood-Antis School District (Third Class)
- Claysburg-Kimmel School District (Fourth Class; also extends into Bedford County)
- Hollidaysburg Area School District (Third Class)
- Spring Cove School District (Third Class)
- Tyrone Area School District (Third Class; also extends into Centre and Huntingdon Counties)
- Williamsburg Community School District (Fourth Class)

=== Cambria County ===
- Blacklick Valley School District (Third Class)
- Cambria Heights School District (Third Class)
- Central Cambria School District (Third Class)
- Conemaugh Valley School District (Third Class)
- Ferndale Area School District (Third Class)
- Forest Hills School District (Third Class)
- Greater Johnstown School District (Second Class)
- Northern Cambria School District (Third Class)
- Penn Cambria School District (Third Class; also extends into Blair County)
- Portage Area School District (Third Class)
- Richland School District (Third Class)
- Westmont Hilltop School District (Third Class)

=== Somerset County ===
- Berlin Brothersvalley School District (Third Class)
- Conemaugh Township Area School District (Third Class)
- Meyersdale Area School District (Third Class)
- North Star School District (Third Class)
- Rockwood Area School District (Third Class)
- Salisbury-Elk Lick School District (Fourth Class)
- Shade-Central City School District (Fourth Class)
- Shanksville-Stonycreek School District (Fourth Class)
- Somerset Area School District (Third Class)
- Turkeyfoot Valley Area School District (Fourth Class)
- Windber Area School District (Third Class; also extends into Cambria County)

== Seneca Highlands IU 9 ==
=== Cameron County ===
- Cameron County School District (Third Class)

=== Elk County ===
- Johnsonburg Area School District (Third Class)
- Ridgway Area School District (Third Class)
- Saint Marys Area School District (Third Class)

=== McKean County ===
- Bradford Area School District (Third Class)
- Kane Area School District (Third Class; also extends into Elk County)
- Otto-Eldred School District (Third Class)
- Port Allegany School District (Third Class; also extends into Potter County)
- Smethport Area School District (Third Class)

=== Potter County ===
- Austin Area School District (Fourth Class)
- Coudersport Area School District (Fourth Class)
- Galeton Area School District (Fourth Class; also extends into Tioga County)
- Northern Potter School District (Fourth Class)
- Oswayo Valley School District (Fourth Class; also extends into McKean County)

== Central IU 10 ==
=== Centre County ===
- Bald Eagle Area School District (Third Class)
- Bellefonte Area School District (Third Class)
- Penns Valley Area School District (Third Class)
- State College Area School District (Second Class)

=== Clearfield County ===
- Clearfield Area School District (Third Class)
- Curwensville Area School District (Third Class)
- Glendale School District (Third Class; also extends into Cambria County)
- Harmony Area School District (Fourth Class; also extends into Indiana County)
- Moshannon Valley School District (Third Class)
- Philipsburg-Osceola Area School District (Third Class; also extends into Centre County)
- West Branch Area School District (Third Class; also extends into Clinton County)

=== Clinton County ===
- Keystone Central School District (Second Class; also extends into Centre and Potter Counties)

== Tuscarora IU 11 ==
=== Fulton County ===
- Central Fulton School District (Fourth Class)
- Forbes Road School District (Fourth Class)
- Southern Fulton School District (Fourth Class)

=== Huntingdon County ===
- Huntingdon Area School District (Third Class)
- Juniata Valley School District (Fourth Class)
- Mount Union Area School District (Third Class; also extends into Mifflin County)
- Southern Huntingdon County School District (Third Class)

=== Juniata County ===
- Juniata County School District (Third Class)

=== Mifflin County ===
- Mifflin County School District (Second Class)

== Lincoln IU 12 ==
=== Adams County ===
- Bermudian Springs School District (Third Class)
- Conewago Valley School District (Third Class)
- Fairfield Area School District (Fourth Class)
- Gettysburg Area School District (Third Class)
- Littlestown Area School District (Third Class)
- Upper Adams School District (Third Class)

=== Franklin County ===
- Chambersburg Area School District (Second Class)
- Fannett-Metal School District (Fourth Class; also extends into Perry County)
- Greencastle-Antrim School District (Third Class)
- Tuscarora School District (Third Class)
- Waynesboro Area School District (Third Class)

=== York County ===
- Central York School District (Third Class)
- Dallastown Area School District (Third Class)
- Dover Area School District (Third Class)
- Eastern York School District (Third Class)
- Hanover Public School District (Third Class)
- Northeastern York School District (Third Class)
- Red Lion Area School District (Third Class)
- South Eastern School District (Third Class)
- South Western School District (Third Class)
- Southern York County School District (Third Class)
- Spring Grove Area School District (Third Class)
- West York Area School District (Third Class)
- York City School District (Second Class)
- York Suburban School District (Third Class)

== Lancaster-Lebanon IU 13 ==
=== Lancaster County ===
- Cocalico School District (Third Class)
- Columbia Borough School District (Third Class)
- Conestoga Valley School District (Third Class)
- Donegal School District (Third Class)
- Eastern Lancaster County School District (Third Class)
- Elizabethtown Area School District (Third Class)
- Ephrata Area School District (Third Class)
- Hempfield School District (Third Class)
- Lampeter-Strasburg School District (Third Class)
- Lancaster School District (Second Class)
- Manheim Central School District (Third Class)
- Manheim Township School District (Third Class)
- Penn Manor School District (Third Class)
- Pequea Valley School District (Third Class)
- Solanco School District (Third Class)
- Warwick School District (Third Class)

=== Lebanon County ===
- Annville-Cleona School District (Third Class)
- Cornwall-Lebanon School District (Third Class)
- Eastern Lebanon County School District (Third Class)
- Lebanon School District (Third Class)
- Northern Lebanon School District (Third Class)
- Palmyra Area School District (Third Class)

== Berks County IU 14 ==
=== Berks County ===
- Antietam School District (Third Class)
- Boyertown Area School District (Third Class; also extends into Montgomery County)
- Brandywine Heights Area School District (Third Class)
- Conrad Weiser Area School District (Third Class; also extends into Lancaster County)
- Daniel Boone Area School District (Third Class)
- Exeter Township School District (Third Class)
- Fleetwood Area School District (Third Class)
- Governor Mifflin School District (Third Class)
- Hamburg Area School District (Third Class)
- Kutztown Area School District (Third Class)
- Muhlenberg School District (Third Class)
- Oley Valley School District (Third Class)
- Reading School District (Second Class)
- Schuylkill Valley School District (Third Class)
- Tulpehocken Area School District (Third Class)
- Twin Valley School District (Third Class; also extends into Chester County)
- Wilson School District (Third Class)
- Wyomissing Area School District (Third Class)

== Capital Area IU 15 ==
=== Cumberland County ===
- Big Spring School District (Third Class)
- Camp Hill School District (Third Class)
- Carlisle Area School District (Third Class)
- Cumberland Valley School District (Third Class)
- East Pennsboro Area School District (Third Class)
- Mechanicsburg Area School District (Third Class)
- Shippensburg Area School District (Third Class; also extends into Franklin County)
- South Middleton School District (Third Class)
- West Shore School District (Second Class; also extends into York County, where the district offices are located)

=== Dauphin County ===
- Central Dauphin School District (Second Class)
- Derry Township School District (Third Class)
- Halifax Area School District (Fourth Class)
- Harrisburg City School District (Second Class)
- Lower Dauphin School District (Third Class)
- Middletown Area School District (Third Class)
- Millersburg Area School District (Third Class)
- Steelton-Highspire School District (Third Class)
- Susquehanna Township School District (Third Class)
- Upper Dauphin Area School District (Third Class)

=== Perry County ===
- Greenwood School District (Fourth Class; also extends into Juniata County)
- Newport School District (Third Class)
- Susquenita School District (Third Class; also extends into Dauphin County)
- West Perry School District (Third Class)

=== York County ===
- Northern York County School District (Third Class)

== Central Susquehanna IU 16 ==
=== Columbia County ===
- Benton Area School District (Fourth Class)
- Berwick Area School District (Third Class; also extends into Luzerne County)
- Bloomsburg Area School District (Third Class)
- Central Columbia School District (Third Class)
- Millville Area School District (Fourth Class)
- Southern Columbia Area School District (Third Class; also extends into Northumberland County)

=== Montour County ===
- Danville Area School District (Third Class; also extends into Northumberland County)

=== Northumberland County ===
- Line Mountain School District (Third Class)
- Milton Area School District (Third Class; also extends into Union County)
- Mount Carmel Area School District (Third Class; also extends into Columbia County)
- Shamokin Area School District (Third Class)
- Shikellamy School District (Third Class)
- Warrior Run School District (Third Class; also extends into Montour and Union Counties)

=== Snyder County ===
- Midd-West School District (Third Class)
- Selinsgrove Area School District (Third Class)

=== Union County ===
- Lewisburg Area School District (Third Class)
- Mifflinburg Area School District (Third Class)

== BLaST IU 17 ==
=== Bradford County ===
- Athens Area School District (Third Class)
- Canton Area School District (Third Class; also extends into Lycoming and Tioga Counties)
- Northeast Bradford School District (Fourth Class)
- Sayre Area School District (Third Class)
- Towanda Area School District (Third Class)
- Troy Area School District (Third Class)
- Wyalusing Area School District (Third Class; also extends into Wyoming County)

=== Lycoming County ===
- East Lycoming School District (Third Class)
- Jersey Shore Area School District (Third Class; also extends into Clinton County)
- Loyalsock Township School District (Third Class)
- Montgomery Area School District (Fourth Class)
- Montoursville Area School District (Third Class)
- Muncy School District (Third Class)
- South Williamsport Area School District (Third Class)
- Williamsport Area School District (Second Class)

=== Sullivan County ===
- Sullivan County School District (Third Class)

=== Tioga County ===
- Northern Tioga School District (Third Class)
- Southern Tioga School District (Third Class; also extends into Lycoming County)
- Wellsboro Area School District (Third Class; also extends into Lycoming County)

== Luzerne IU 18 ==
=== Luzerne County ===
- Crestwood School District (Third Class)
- Dallas School District (Third Class)
- Greater Nanticoke Area School District (Third Class)
- Hanover Area School District (Third Class)
- Hazleton Area School District (Second Class; also extends into Carbon and Schuylkill Counties)
- Lake-Lehman School District (Third Class; also extends into Wyoming County)
- Northwest Area School District (Third Class)
- Pittston Area School District (Second Class)
- Wilkes-Barre Area School District (Second Class)
- Wyoming Area School District (Third Class; also extends into Wyoming County)
- Wyoming Valley West School District (Second Class)

=== Wyoming County ===
- Tunkhannock Area School District (Third Class)

== Northeastern Educational IU 19 ==
=== Lackawanna County ===
- Abington Heights School District (Third Class)
- Carbondale Area School District (Third Class)
- Dunmore School District (Third Class)
- Lakeland School District (Third Class)
- Mid Valley School District (Third Class)
- North Pocono School District (Third Class; also extends into Wayne County)
- Old Forge School District (Third Class)
- Riverside School District (Third Class)
- Scranton School District (Second Class)
- Valley View School District (Third Class)

=== Susquehanna County ===
- Blue Ridge School District (Third Class)
- Elk Lake School District (Third Class; also extends into Wyoming County)
- Forest City Regional School District (Third Class; also extends into Lackawanna and Wayne Counties)
- Montrose Area School District (Third Class)
- Mountain View School District (Third Class)
- Susquehanna Community School District (Third Class; also extends into Wayne County)

=== Wayne County ===
- Wallenpaupack Area School District (Third Class; also extends into Pike County, where the district offices are located)
- Wayne Highlands School District (Third Class)
- Western Wayne School District (Third Class)

=== Wyoming County ===
- Lackawanna Trail School District (Third Class; also extends into Lackawanna County)

== Colonial IU 20 ==
=== Monroe County ===
- East Stroudsburg Area School District (Third Class; also extends into Pike County)
- Pleasant Valley School District (Third Class)
- Pocono Mountain School District (Third Class)
- Stroudsburg Area School District (Third Class)

=== Northampton County ===
- Bangor Area School District (Third Class)
- Bethlehem Area School District (Second Class; also extends into Lehigh County)
- Easton Area School District (Second Class)
- Nazareth Area School District (Third Class)
- Northampton Area School District (Third Class)
- Pen Argyl Area School District (Third Class)
- Saucon Valley School District (Third Class)
- Wilson Area School District (Third Class)

=== Pike County ===
- Delaware Valley School District (Third Class)

== Carbon-Lehigh IU 21 ==
=== Carbon County ===
- Jim Thorpe Area School District (Third Class)
- Lehighton Area School District (Third Class)
- Palmerton Area School District (Third Class)
- Panther Valley School District (Third Class; also extends into Schuylkill County)
- Weatherly Area School District (Fourth Class)

=== Lehigh County ===
- Allentown City School District (Second Class)
- Catasauqua Area School District (Third Class; also extends into Northampton County)
- East Penn School District (Third Class)
- Northern Lehigh School District (Third Class; also extends into Northampton County)
- Northwestern Lehigh School District (Third Class)
- Parkland School District (Third Class)
- Salisbury Township School District (Third Class)
- Southern Lehigh School District (Third Class)
- Whitehall-Coplay School District (Third Class)

== Bucks County IU 22 ==
=== Bucks County ===
- Bensalem Township School District (Second Class)
- Bristol Borough School District (Third Class)
- Bristol Township School District (Second Class)
- Centennial School District (Second Class)
- Central Bucks School District (Second Class)
- Council Rock School District (Third Class)
- Morrisville Borough School District (Third Class)
- Neshaminy School District (Second Class)
- New Hope-Solebury School District (Fourth Class)
- Palisades School District (Third Class)
- Pennridge School District (Third Class)
- Pennsbury School District (Second Class)
- Quakertown Community School District (Third Class)

== Montgomery County IU 23 ==
=== Montgomery County ===
- Abington School District (Second Class)
- Bryn Athyn School District (Fourth Class)
- Cheltenham Township School District (Second Class)
- Colonial School District (Second Class)
- Hatboro-Horsham School District (Third Class)
- Jenkintown School District (Third Class)
- Lower Merion School District (Second Class)
- Lower Moreland Township School District (Third Class)
- Methacton School District (Third Class)
- Norristown Area School District (Second Class)
- North Penn School District (Second Class; also extends into Bucks County)
- Perkiomen Valley School District (Third Class)
- Pottsgrove School District (Third Class)
- Pottstown School District (Third Class)
- Souderton Area School District (Third Class; also extends into Bucks County)
- Spring-Ford Area School District (Third Class; also extends into Chester County)
- Springfield Township School District (Third Class)
- Upper Dublin School District (Third Class)
- Upper Merion Area School District (Second Class)
- Upper Moreland School District (Third Class)
- Upper Perkiomen School District (Third Class; also extends into Berks County)
- Wissahickon School District (Third Class)

== Chester County IU 24 ==
=== Chester County ===
- Avon Grove School District (Third Class)
- Coatesville Area School District (Second Class)
- Downingtown Area School District (Third Class)
- Great Valley School District (Third Class)
- Kennett Consolidated School District (Third Class)
- Octorara Area School District (Third Class; also extends into Lancaster County)
- Owen J. Roberts School District (Third Class)
- Oxford Area School District (Third Class)
- Phoenixville Area School District (Third Class)
- Tredyffrin-Easttown School District (Second Class)
- Unionville-Chadds Ford School District (Third Class; also extends into Delaware County)
- West Chester Area School District (Second Class; also extends into Delaware County)

== Delaware County IU 25 ==
=== Delaware County ===
- Chester-Upland School District (Second Class)
- Chichester School District (Third Class)
- Garnet Valley School District (Third Class)
- Haverford Township School District (Second Class)
- Interboro School District (Third Class)
- Marple Newtown School District (Second Class)
- Penn-Delco School District (Third Class)
- Radnor Township School District (Third Class)
- Ridley School District (Second Class)
- Rose Tree Media School District (Third Class)
- Southeast Delco School District (Second Class)
- Springfield School District (Second Class)
- Upper Darby School District (Second Class)
- Wallingford-Swarthmore School District (Third Class)
- William Penn School District (Second Class)

== Philadelphia IU 26 ==
=== Philadelphia County ===
- Philadelphia City School District (First Class)

== Beaver Valley IU 27 ==
=== Beaver County ===
- Aliquippa School District (Third Class)
- Ambridge Area School District (Third Class)
- Beaver Area School District (Third Class)
- Big Beaver Falls Area School District (Third Class)
- Blackhawk School District (Third Class; also extends into Lawrence County)
- Central Valley School District (Third Class)
- Freedom Area School District (Third Class)
- Hopewell Area School District (Third Class)
- Midland Borough School District (Third Class)
- New Brighton Area School District (Third Class)
- Riverside Beaver County School District (Third Class)
- Rochester Area School District (Third Class)
- South Side Area School District (Fourth Class)
- Western Beaver County School District (Third Class)

==== Defunct ====
- Center Area School District

== ARIN IU 28 ==
=== Armstrong County ===
- Apollo-Ridge School District (Third Class; also extends into Indiana County)
- Armstrong School District (Second Class; also extends into Indiana County)
- Freeport Area School District (Third Class; also extends into Butler County)
- Leechburg Area School District (Third Class; also extends into Westmoreland County)

=== Indiana County ===
- Homer-Center School District (Third Class)
- Indiana Area School District (Third Class)
- Marion Center Area School District (Third Class)
- Penns Manor Area School District (Third Class)
- Purchase Line School District (Third Class; also extends into Clearfield County)
- River Valley School District (Third Class; also extends into Westmoreland County)
- United School District (Third Class)

== Schuylkill IU 29 ==
=== Schuylkill County ===
- Blue Mountain School District (Third Class)
- Mahanoy Area School District (Third Class)
- Minersville Area School District (Third Class)
- North Schuylkill School District (Third Class; also extends into Columbia County)
- Pine Grove Area School District (Third Class)
- Pottsville Area School District (Third Class)
- Saint Clair Area School District (Third Class)
- Schuylkill Haven Area School District (Third Class)
- Shenandoah Valley School District (Third Class)
- Tamaqua Area School District (Third Class)
- Tri-Valley School District (Third Class)
- Williams Valley School District (Third Class; also extends into Dauphin County)

== See also ==
- List of high schools in Pennsylvania
