= Mid-Penn Conference =

Pennsylvania high school athletic conference

The Mid-Penn Conference (MPC) is a high school athletic conference with its membership base located in south central Pennsylvania. Founded in 1982, the conference and its members are affiliated with the Pennsylvania Interscholastic Athletic Association, and all but three schools are located in PIAA District 3.

== History ==
=== 1982-2004 ===
Location of Original Mid-Penn Conference Members

The Mid-Penn Conference was created in 1982 when twenty-seven schools from four different athletic conferences in south central Pennsylvania joined together to create a single organization. Members of the Blue Mountain League (Big Spring, Boiling Springs, Camp Hill, Northern York, Shippensburg and Susquenita), Capital Area Conference (Cumberland Valley, East Pennsboro, Hershey, Lower Dauphin, Mechanicsburg, Middletown, Milton Hershey, Palmyra, Red Land and Susquehanna Township), South Central Athletic League (Bishop McDevitt, Carlisle, Cedar Cliff, Central Dauphin, Central Dauphin East, Chambersburg, Delone Catholic, Steelton-Highspire and Trinity) and Tri-Valley League (West Perry), along with former independents Harrisburg, composed the MPC's inaugural roster. At the time of its founding, it was the largest athletic conference in the PIAA in both membership and geographic footprint, spanning seven counties (Adams, Cumberland, Dauphin, Franklin, Lebanon, Perry and York). The conference experienced its first membership change in 1986, when Adams County-based Delone Catholic left to join the smaller Blue Mountain League. Six years later, eight of the eleven schools in the Blue Mountain League (Bermudian Springs, Biglerville, Fairfield, Gettysburg, Greencastle-Antrim, James Buchanan, Scotland and Waynesboro) became MPC members, bringing about the demise of their former conference. Ironically, the merger came after an attempt from Waynesboro, the largest member of the conference, to join the MPC a few months earlier.

=== 2004-2018 ===
The Mid-Penn Conference experienced a decade-plus of stability in its membership ledger until 2004, when Biglerville was accepted as members the York-Adams Interscholastic Athletic Association. Bermudian Springs and Fairfield followed Biglerville into the YAIAA a few days later. At the same time, the MPC took on four former independents as football-only associate members: Altoona, Central Mountain, Hollidaysburg and State College. Only a few weeks after their entry, Central Mountain backed out on joining the Mid-Penn Conference after they were reclassified into a smaller division by the PIAA. Williamsport had also expressed interest in joining the MPC's football roster at that time but chose to remain in the Wyoming Valley Conference instead. A few years after joining, the MPC lost two football-only associate members. Hollidaysburg left after just two seasons and Altoona made their departure after the 2009 football season. That same year, the Scotland School for Veteran's Children, a state-run public school for children of active and former military members, closed its doors due to state budget cuts. In 2012, State College joined the MPC as full members after nearly a decade of associate membership, and they were joined by the newly created Mifflin County High School in Lewistown. Two years later, Gettysburg and Susquenita left the MPC for membership in the YAIAA and Tri-Valley League, respectively.

=== 2018-present ===
Altoona rejoined the conference for football as an associate member in 2018 along with three other sports (boys' basketball, girls' basketball and boys volleyball). Two years later, Altoona's baseball, softball and girls' volleyball programs joined the Mid-Penn. The MPC also acquired six new associate members when the Tri-Valley League dropped sponsorship of football in 2020: Halifax, Juniata, Line Mountain, Newport, Upper Dauphin and former full members Susquenita. Gettysburg also rejoined the conference in 2022, bringing the total number of member schools to its current tally of thirty-two. For the 2026 football season, the Mid-Penn Conference will be losing Big Spring and James Buchanan as members. Both schools will be joining the YAIAA as associate members for shorter travel distances and greater parity in competition, while remaining in the MPC for all other sports and activities.

== List of member schools ==
=== Current full members ===
School	Location	Affiliation	Enrollment	Mascot	Colors	Joined
Altoona	Altoona, PA	Public	1,858	Mountain Lions		2020
Big Spring	Newville, PA	Public	551	Bulldogs		1982
Bishop McDevitt	Harrisburg, PA	Private (Catholic)	545	Crusaders		1982
Boiling Springs	Boiling Springs, PA	Public	598	Bubblers		1982
Camp Hill	Camp Hill, PA	Public	317	Lions		1982
Carlisle	Carlisle, PA	Public	1,367	Thundering Herd		1982
Cedar Cliff	Camp Hill, PA	Public	1,179	Colts		1982
Central Dauphin	Harrisburg, PA	Public	1,516	Rams		1982
Central Dauphin East	Harrisburg, PA	Public	1,261	Panthers		1982
Chambersburg	Chambersburg, PA	Public	2,090	Trojans		1982
Cumberland Valley	Mechanicsburg, PA	Public	2,532	Eagles		1982
East Pennsboro	Enola, PA	Public	680	Panthers		1982
Gettysburg (Note: Left the Mid-Penn Conference in 2014, returned in 2022)	Gettysburg, PA	Public	913	Warriors		1992, 2022
Greencastle-Antrim	Greencastle, PA	Public	836	Blue Devils		1992
Harrisburg	Harrisburg, PA	Public	1,920	Cougars		1982
Hershey	Hershey, PA	Public	872	Trojans		1982
James Buchanan	Mercersburg, PA	Public	543	Rockets		1992
Lower Dauphin	Hummelstown, PA	Public	922	Falcons		1982
Mechanicsburg	Mechanicsburg, PA	Public	1,209	Wildcats		1982
Middletown	Middletown, PA	Public	660	Blue Raiders		1982
Mifflin County	Lewistown, PA	Public	1,114	Huskies		2012
Milton Hershey	Hershey, PA	Private (Nonsectarian)	752	Spartans		1982
Northern York	Dillsburg, PA	Public	962	Polar Bears		1982
Palmyra	Palmyra, PA	Public	950	Cougars		1982
Red Land	Lewisberry, PA	Public	907	Patriots		1982
Shippensburg	Shippensburg, PA	Public	951	Greyhounds		1982
State College	State College, PA	Public	1,740	Little Lions		2012
Steelton-Highspire	Steelton, PA	Public	249	Steam Rollers		1982
Susquehanna Township	Harrisburg, PA	Public	563	Indians		1982
Trinity	Camp Hill, PA	Private (Catholic)	430	Shamrocks		1982
Waynesboro	Waynesboro, PA	Public	1,262	Indians		1992
West Perry	Elliottsburg, PA	Public	648	Mustangs		1982

=== Current associate members ===
School	Location	Affiliation	Mascot	Colors	Primary Conference	Joined	Sport(s)
Halifax	Halifax, PA	Public	Wildcats		Tri-Valley	2020	Football
Juniata	Mifflintown, PA	Public	Indians		Tri-Valley	2020	Football
Line Mountain	Herndon, PA	Public	Eagles		Tri-Valley	2020	Football
Newport	Newport, PA	Public	Buffaloes		Tri-Valley	2020	Football
Susquenita	Duncannon, PA	Public	Blackhawks		Tri-Valley	2020	Football
Upper Dauphin	Elizabethville, PA	Public	Trojans		Tri-Valley	2020	Football

=== Former full members ===
School	Location	Affiliation	Mascot	Colors	Joined	Left	Conference Joined	Current Conference
Bermudian Springs	York Springs, PA	Public	Eagles		1992	2004	YAIAA	
Biglerville	Biglerville, PA	Public	Canners		1992	2004	YAIAA	
Delone Catholic	McSherrytown, PA	Private (Catholic)	Squires		1982	1986	Blue Mountain	YAIAA
Fairfield	Fairfield, PA	Public	Green Knights		1992	2004	YAIAA	
Scotland	Scotland, PA	Public (State)	Cadets		1992	2009	Closed	
Susquenita	Duncannon, PA	Public	Blackhawks		1982	2014	Tri-Valley	

=== Former associate members ===
School	Location	Affiliation	Mascot	Colors	Seasons	Primary Conference	Sport(s)
Altoona	Altoona, PA	Public	Mountain Lions		2004-2009, 2018-2020	Mountain Athletic, WPIAL	Football, Boys' Basketball, Girls' Basketball, Boys' Vollebyall
Hollidaysburg	Hollidaysburg, PA	Public	Golden Tigers		2004-2005	Mountain Athletic	Football
State College	State College, PA	Public	Little Lions		2004-2011	Mountain Athletic	Football

== Membership timeline ==
=== Football members ===
Division 1 Division 2 Division 3 Division 4 Commonwealth Division Keystone Division Colonial Division Capital Division Liberty Division Patriot Division

== Membership map ==
Mid-Penn Conference
Location of Mid-Penn Conference full members:
1 Altoona
2 Big Spring
3 Bishop McDevitt
4 Boiling Springs
5 Camp Hill
6 Carlisle
7 Cedar Cliff
8 Central Dauphin
9 Central Dauphin East
10 Chambersburg
11 Cumberland Valley
12 East Pennsboro
13 Gettysburg
14 Greencastle-Antrim
15 Harrisburg
16 Hershey
17 James Buchanan
18 Lower Dauphin
19 Mechanicsburg
20 Middletown
21 Mifflin County
22 Milton Hershey
23 Northern York
24 Palmyra
25 Red Land
26 Shippensburg
27 State College
28 Steelton-Highspire
29 Susquehanna Township
30 Trinity
31 Waynesboro
32 West Perry

== Sponsored sports ==
School	Baseball	Boys Basketball	Girls Basketball	Boys Cross Country	Girls Cross Country	Field Hockey	Football	Boys Golf	Girls Golf	Boys Lacrosse	Girls Lacrosse	Boys Soccer	Girls Soccer	Softball	Boys Swim & Dive	Girls Swim & Dive	Boys Tennis	Girls Tennis	Boys Track & Field	Girls Track & Field	Boys Volleyball	Girls Volleyball	Wrestling
Altoona	X	X	X				X							X							X	X	
Big Spring	X	X	X	X	X	X	X	X	X			X	X	X	X	X			X	X		X	X
Bishop McDevitt	X	X	X	X	X	X	X	X	X	X	X	X	X	X	X	X	X	X	X	X		X	X
Boiling Springs	X	X	X	X	X	X	X	X	X			X	X	X	X	X			X	X		X	X
Camp Hill	X	X	X	X	X	X	X	X	X			X	X	X			X	X	X	X			X
Carlisle	X	X	X	X	X	X	X	X	X	X	X	X	X	X	X	X	X	X	X	X	X	X	X
Cedar Cliff	X	X	X	X	X	X	X	X	X	X	X	X	X	X	X	X	X	X	X	X	X	X	X
Central Dauphin	X	X	X	X	X	X	X	X	X	X	X	X	X	X	X	X	X	X	X	X	X	X	X
Central Dauphin East	X	X	X	X	X	X	X	X	X	X	X	X	X	X	X	X	X	X	X	X	X	X	X
Chambersburg	X	X	X	X	X	X	X	X	X	X	X	X	X	X	X	X	X	X	X	X	X	X	X
Cumberland Valley	X	X	X	X	X	X	X	X	X	X	X	X	X	X	X	X	X	X	X	X	X	X	X
East Pennsboro	X	X	X	X	X	X	X	X	X			X	X	X	X	X	X	X	X	X			X
Gettysburg	X	X	X	X	X	X	X	X	X	X	X	X	X	X	X	X	X	X	X	X		X	X
Greencastle-Antrim	X	X	X	X	X	X	X	X	X			X	X	X					X	X		X	X
Harrisburg	X	X	X				X					X		X				X	X	X		X	X
Hershey	X	X	X	X	X	X	X	X	X	X	X	X	X	X	X	X	X	X	X	X	X	X	X
James Buchanan	X	X	X	X	X		X	X	X			X	X	X	X	X	X	X	X	X		X	X
Lower Dauphin	X	X	X	X	X	X	X	X	X	X	X	X	X	X	X	X	X	X	X	X	X	X	X
Mechanicsburg	X	X	X	X	X	X	X	X	X	X	X	X	X	X	X	X	X	X	X	X	X	X	X
Middletown	X	X	X	X	X	X	X	X	X			X	X	X			X	X	X	X		X	X
Mifflin County	X	X	X	X	X	X	X	X	X			X	X	X	X	X	X	X	X	X		X	X
Milton Hershey	X	X	X	X	X	X	X					X	X	X	X	X			X	X		X	X
Northern York	X	X	X	X	X	X	X	X	X	X	X	X	X	X	X	X	X	X	X	X	X	X	X
Palmyra	X	X	X	X	X	X	X	X		X	X	X	X	X	X	X	X	X	X	X	X	X	X
Red Land	X	X	X	X	X	X	X	X	X	X	X	X	X	X	X	X	X	X	X	X	X	X	X
Shippensburg	X	X	X	X	X	X	X	X				X	X	X	X	X			X	X		X	X
State College	X	X	X	X	X	X	X	X	X	X	X	X	X	X	X	X	X	X	X	X	X	X	X
Steelton-Highspire	X	X	X				X							X					X	X		X	X
Susquehanna Township	X	X	X	X	X	X	X	X	X			X	X	X	X	X	X	X	X	X			X
Trinity	X	X	X	X	X		X	X	X	X	X	X	X	X	X	X	X	X	X	X		X	X
Waynesboro	X	X	X	X	X	X	X	X	X			X	X	X	X	X			X	X		X	X
West Perry	X	X	X	X	X	X	X					X	X	X					X	X		X	X

== List of state champions ==
=== Fall sports ===
Boys Cross Country
School	Year	Classification
Hershey	1990	Class AA
Cedar Cliff	2001	Class AAA
Cedar Cliff	2004	Class AAA
Camp Hill	2015	Class A
State College	2024	Class AAA

Girls Cross Country
School	Year	Classification
Chambersburg	1989	Class AAA
Palmyra	2012	Class AA
Trinity	2015	Class A

Field Hockey
School	Year	Classification
Lower Dauphin	1993	Class AAA
Lower Dauphin	1998	Class AAA
Palmyra	2005	Class AA
Lower Dauphin	2006	Class AAA
Lower Dauphin	2009	Class AAA
Lower Dauphin	2012	Class AAA
Lower Dauphin	2013	Class AAA
Palmyra	2014	Class AAA
Hershey	2018	Class AAA
Boiling Springs	2022	Class A
Lower Dauphin	2022	Class AAA
Mechanicsburg	2022	Class AA
West Perry	2024	Class A

Football
School	Year	Classification
Camp Hill	1988	Class A
Cumberland Valley	1992	Class AAAA
Scotland	1992	Class A
Bishop McDevitt	1995	Class AA
Steelton-Highspire	2007	Class A
Steelton-Highspire	2008	Class A
Central Dauphin	2011	Class AAAA
Bishop McDevitt	2022	Class AAAA
Steelton-Highspire	2022	Class A
Steelton-Highspire	2023	Class A
Bishop McDevitt	2025	Class A

Boys Golf
School	Year	Classification
State College	2021	Class AAA

Boys Soccer
School	Year	Classification
Middletown	2001	Class AA
Palmyra	2007	Class AA
Central Dauphin	2009	Class AAA
Camp Hill	2016	Class A
Lower Dauphin	2016	Class AAA
Camp Hill	2017	Class A
Lower Dauphin	2017	Class AAA
Lower Dauphin	2019	Class AAA
Hershey	2022	Class AAA
Camp Hill	2023	Class AA
Cumberland Valley	2024	Class AAAA

Girls Soccer
School	Year	Classification
Cumberland Valley	2011	
Cumberland Valley	2012	
Trinity	2014	Class A
Trinity	2016	Class AA
Camp Hill	2019	Class A
Central Dauphin	2022	Class AAAA

Girls Volleyball
School	Year	Classification
Palmyra	2019	Class AAA
Trinity	2020	Class AA
Trinity	2024	Class AA

=== Winter sports ===
Boys Basketball
School	Year	Classification
Carlisle	1985	Class AAAA
Carlisle	1986	Class AAAA
Carlisle	1987	Class AAAA
Carlisle	1988	Class AAAA
Steelton-Highspire	1992	Class AAAA
Scotland	1994	Class A
Scotland	1995	Class A
Susquehanna Township	1997	Class AAA
Harrisburg	1998	Class AAAA
Steelton-Highspire	1998	Class AAA
Steelton-Highspire	2000	Class AAA
Trinity	2001	Class AA
Harrisburg	2002	Class AAAA
Scotland	2002	Class A
Scotland	2003	Class A
Trinity	2003	Class AA
Steelton-Highspire	2005	Class AAA
Steelton-Highspire	2008	Class AAA
Central Dauphin	2026	Class AAAAAA
Trinity	2026	Class AAA

Girls Basketball
School	Year	Classification
Trinity	1986	Class AA
Trinity	2001	Class AA
Cumberland Valley	2002	Class AAAA
Central Dauphin	2008	Class AAAA
Steelton-Highspire	2011	Class A
Steelton-Highspire	2012	Class A
Cumberland Valley	2014	Class AAAA
Cumberland Valley	2015	Class AAAA
Cumberland Valley	2016	Class AAAA

Competitive Spirit
School	Year	Classification
Cumberland Valley	2012	Large Schools
Cumberland Valley	2014	Large Schools
Cumberland Valley	2015	Large Schools
Cumberland Valley	2017	Large Schools

Gymnastics
School	Year	Classification
Red Land	1991	Intermediate Schools
Red Land	1992	Intermediate Schools

Boys Swimming & Diving
School	Year	Classification
Hershey	2003	Class AA
Hershey	2004	Class AA
Hershey	2005	Class AA
Hershey	2009	Class AA
Hershey	2010	Class AA
Hershey	2011	Class AAA
Bishop McDevitt	2021	Class AA

Girls Swimming & Diving
School	Year	Classification
Hershey	1995	Class AA
Hershey	2005	Class AA
Hershey	2006	Class AA
Hershey	2011	Class AAA
Hershey	2013	Class AAA
Hershey	2014	Class AAA
Hershey	2015	Class AAA

Wrestling
School	Year	Classification
Central Dauphin	2008	Class AAA
Central Dauphin	2009	Class AAA
Central Dauphin	2010	Class AAA
Central Dauphin	2011	Class AAA

=== Spring sports ===
Baseball
School	Year	Classification
Chambersburg	1984	Class AAA
Red Land	1990	Class AAA
Central Dauphin	1997	Class AAA
Camp Hill	1999	Class A
Chambersburg	1999	Class AAA
Palmyra	1999	Class AA
Chambersburg	2004	Class AAA
Camp Hill	2008	Class A
Camp Hill	2009	Class A
Northern York	2011	Class AAA
Red Land	2019	Class AAAAA
Cedar Cliff	2025	Class AAAAAA

Girls Soccer
School	Year	Classification
Central Dauphin	2008	Class AAA
Lower Dauphin	2009	Class AAA

Softball
School	Year	Classification
Chambersburg	1994	Class AAA
Chambersburg	1997	Class AAA
Greencastle-Antrim	2009	Class AAA
Big Spring	2012	Class AAA
Central Dauphin	2019	Class AAAAAA
West Perry	2019	Class AAAA
Northern York	2023	Class AAAAA
Central Dauphin	2025	Class AAAAAA

Boys Track & Field
School	Year	Classification
Harrisburg	1984	Class AAA
Milton Hershey	1985	Class AA
Harrisburg	1986	Class AAA
Susquehanna Township	1986	Class AA
Harrisburg	1989	Class AAA
Milton Hershey	1989	Class AA
Scotland	1991	Class AA
Harrisburg	1992	Class AAA
Scotland	1992	Class AA
Scotland	1995	Class AA
Scotland	1996	Class AA
Scotland	1997	Class AA
Scotland	1999	Class AA
Cumberland Valley	2001	Class AAA
Central Dauphin	2004	Class AAA
Central Dauphin	2005	Class AAA
Trinity	2010	Class AA
Trinity	2011	Class AA
State College	2019	Class AAA
Chambersburg	2023	Class AAA

Girls Track & Field
School	Year	Classification
Milton Hershey	1985	Class AA
Milton Hershey	1989	Class AA
Milton Hershey	1991	Class AA
Milton Hershey	1993	Class AA
Milton Hershey	1994	Class AA
Milton Hershey	1995	Class AA
Harrisburg	1998	Class AAA
Milton Hershey	1999	Class AA
Harrisburg	2000	Class AAA
Milton Hershey	2000	Class AA
Milton Hershey	2001	Class AA
Milton Hershey	2002	Class AA
Milton Hershey	2003	Class AA
Milton Hershey	2005	Class AA
Milton Hershey	2006	Class AA

Boys Volleyball
School	Year	Classification
Cumberland Valley	2008	Class AAA
Central Dauphin	2009	Class AAA
Chambersburg	2012	Class AAA
Lower Dauphin	2023	Class AA
Cumberland Valley	2025	Class AAA

== List of conference champions ==
=== Boys Basketball ===
==== Division I/Commonwealth Division ====
School	Quantity	Years
Harrisburg	19	1987, 1991, 1994, 1995, 1997, 1998, 1999, 2001, 2002, 2003, 2004, 2005, 2006, 2007, 2009, 2010, 2011, 2013, 2014, 2015, 2016
Carlisle	7	1983, 1984, 1985, 1986, 1988, 2014, 2016
Steelton-Highspire	6	1989, 1990, 1992, 1993, 2000, 2008
Central Dauphin	5	2012, 2020, 2021, 2025, 2026
Cumberland Valley	4	2014, 2022, 2024, 2025
State College	3	2017, 2018, 2023
Chambersburg	2	1996, 2019
Central Dauphin East	1	2008
Altoona	0	
Bishop McDevitt	0	
Cedar Cliff	0	
Mifflin County	0	
Waynesboro	0	

==== Division II/Keystone Division ====
School	Quantity	Years
Susquehanna Township	11	1991, 1996, 1997, 1998, 1999, 2000, 2008, 2009, 2013, 2015, 2020
Hershey	7	1983, 1984, 1985, 2010, 2012, 2018, 2024
Mechanicsburg	6	1994, 1995, 2005, 2017, 2024, 2025
Trinity	6	1989, 2001, 2002, 2003, 2004, 2006
Middletown	5	1986, 1988, 1990, 1992, 1993
Bishop McDevitt	3	2014, 2016, 2020
Lower Dauphin	3	2005, 2019, 2021
Red Land	3	2005, 2007, 2010
Cedar Cliff	2	2011, 2022
Milton Hershey	2	2023, 2026
Palmyra	2	1986, 1987
Central Dauphin East	0	
East Pennsboro	0	
Gettysburg	0	
Mifflin County	0	

==== Division III/Colonial Division ====
School	Quantity	Years
Shippensburg	7	1990, 1993, 1998, 2015, 2016, 2020, 2022
Greencastle-Antrim	6	2011, 2012, 2017, 2018, 2024, 2026
Boiling Springs	4	1992, 2003, 2010, 2014
Scotland	4	1999, 2000, 2001, 2002
Camp Hill	3	1983, 1988, 1989
Delone Catholic	3	1984, 1985, 1986
East Pennsboro	3	1991, 2007, 2010
Milton Hershey	3	2005, 2008, 2009
Northern York	3	1995, 2019, 2021
Gettysburg	2	1994, 2013
Susquenita	2	1997, 2004
Waynesboro	2	2022, 2023
West Perry	2	2004, 2006
Big Spring	1	1996
Mechanicsburg	1	1987
Middletown	1	2025
Bermudian Springs	0	
Biglerville	0	
Fairfield	0	
James Buchanan	0	
Trinity	0	

==== Division IV/Capital Division ====
School	Quantity	Years
Bermudian Springs	0	
Big Spring	0	
Biglerville	0	
Boiling Springs	0	
Camp Hill	0	
Fairfield	0	
Greencastle-Antrim	3	2006, 2008, 2010
Scotland	5	1993, 1994, 1995, 2003, 2009
Trinity	12	1996, 1997, 1998, 2011, 2012, 2017, 2019, 2020, 2022, 2023, 2024, 2025
East Pennsboro	2	2001, 2002
James Buchanan	2	2000, 2007
Northern York	1	1999
Shippensburg	1	2005
Susquenita	0	
West Perry	0	
Milton Hershey	4	2004, 2013, 2016, 2018
Middletown	1	2021
Steelton-Highspire	3	2013, 2014, 2015
Bishop McDevitt	1	2026
Susquehanna Township	0	

==== MPC Tournament ====
Year	Champion
2005	Harrisburg
2006	Central Dauphin
2007	None (Snowed Out)
2008	Steelton-Highspire
2009	Central Dauphin East
2010	Hershey
2011	Cedar Cliff
2012	Central Dauphin
2013	Harrisburg
2014	Bishop McDevitt
2015	Cedar Cliff
2016	Milton Hershey
2017	State College
2018	State College
2019	Trinity
2020	Central Dauphin
2021	None (COVID-19)
2022	Cedar Cliff
2023	State College
2024	Cumberland Valley
2025	Cumberland Valley
2026	Central Dauphin

=== Girls Basketball ===
==== Division I/Commonwealth Division ====
School	Quantity	Years
Cumberland Valley	13	1996, 1999, 2001, 2002, 2003, 2013, 2014, 2015, 2016, 2017, 2019, 2021, 2022
Trinity	12	1988,1989, 1990, 1991, 1992, 1993, 1997, 1998, 2006, 2007, 2011, 2012
Central Dauphin	10	1994, 2000, 2007, 2008, 2009, 2010, 2020, 2022, 2024, 2026
Altoona	3	2023, 2024, 2025
Bishop McDevitt	3	1983, 1984, 1985
Harrisburg	3	2004, 2005, 2018
Carlisle	2	1986, 1987
Chambersburg	1	1995
Cedar Cliff	0	
Central Dauphin East	0	
Mifflin County	0	
Palmyra	0	
State College	0	
Steelton-Highspire	0	
Waynesboro	0	

==== Division II/Keystone Division ====
School	Quantity	Years
Lower Dauphin	10	1994, 2003, 2004, 2005, 2007, 2008, 2009, 2011, 2016, 2018
Palmyra	9	1984, 1987, 1988, 2006, 2007, 2011, 2012, 2013, 2015
Mechanicsburg	8	2000, 2010, 2014, 2020, 2021, 2024, 2025, 2026
Cedar Cliff	2	2022, 2023
Central Dauphin East	4	1989, 1990, 1995, 1997
Trinity	4	1983, 1985, 1986, 1987
Bishop McDevitt	3	2016, 2017, 2019
Hershey	3	1992, 1993, 1996
Red Land	3	1991, 1996, 1998
Gettysburg	2	2001, 2002
Susquehanna Township	1	1999
East Pennsboro	0	
Middletown	0	
Mifflin County	0	
Milton Hershey	0	
Steelton-Highspire	0	

==== Division III/Colonial Division ====
School	Quantity	Years
West Perry	8	1989, 1991, 1992, 1993, 1994, 1995, 1998, 2005
Boiling Springs	7	2000, 2005, 2006, 2007, 2008, 2009, 2010
Shippensburg	7	1983, 1987, 1988, 2002, 2018, 2020, 2021
Greencastle-Antrim	6	2014, 2015, 2016, 2017, 2019, 2023
Gettysburg	5	1996, 1997, 2011, 2012, 2013
Big Spring	3	1990, 2013, 2022
Camp Hill	3	1984, 1985, 1986
Northern York	3	2020, 2023, 2024
Middletown	2	2025, 2026
Susquenita	2	2003, 2004
Biglerville	1	1999
East Pennsboro	1	2009
James Buchanan	1	2001
Steelton-Highspire	1	2010
Bermudian Springs	0	
Delone Catholic	0	
Fairfield	0	
Mechanicsburg	0	
Milton Hershey	0	
Scotland	0	
Waynesboro	0	

==== Division IV/Capital Division ====
School	Quantity	Years
Trinity	8	2018, 2019, 2020, 2021, 2022, 2023, 2025, 2026
Steelton-Highspire	6	1994, 1997, 2003, 2011, 2012, 2013
Shippensburg	5	2005, 2006, 2007, 2009, 2010
Big Spring	4	1993, 1995, 1996, 2010
West Perry	3	2000, 2013, 2015
Camp Hill	2	2016, 2017
James Buchanan	2	2005, 2006
Susquehanna Township	2	2024, 2026
Susquenita	2	1999, 2002
Bermudian Springs	1	2004
Biglerville	1	1998
Bishop McDevitt	1	2022
Boiling Springs	1	2001
Middletown	1	2014
Waynesboro	1	2008
East Pennsboro	0	
Fairfield	0	
Greencastle-Antrim	0	
Milton Hershey	0	
Northern York	0	
Scotland	0	

==== MPC Tournament ====
Year	Champion
2005	Harrisburg
2006	Central Dauphin
2007	None (Snowed Out)
2008	Central Dauphin
2009	Central Dauphin
2010	Central Dauphin
2011	Trinity
2012	Gettysburg
2013	Palmyra
2014	Cumberland Valley
2015	Cumberland Valley
2016	Cumberland Valley
2017	Bishop McDevitt
2018	State College
2019	Trinity
2020	Central Dauphin
2021	None (COVID-19)
2022	Cedar Cliff
2023	Cedar Cliff
2024	Central Dauphin
2025	Altoona
2026	Mechanicsburg

=== Football ===
==== Division I/Commonwealth Division ====
School	Quantity	Years
Cumberland Valley	14	1984, 1985, 1987, 1990, 1992, 1993, 1994, 1997, 1999, 2000, 2001, 2003, 2013, 2015
Central Dauphin	13	1998, 1999, 2002, 2004, 2009, 2011, 2012, 2013, 2014, 2015, 2016, 2019, 2020
Harrisburg	9	2006, 2007, 2010, 2012, 2017, 2018, 2021, 2023, 2024
State College	7	2008, 2009, 2015, 2016, 2022, 2024, 2025
Bishop McDevitt	5	1983, 1985, 1995, 1996, 2005
Carlisle	3	1985, 1986, 2025
Cedar Cliff	3	1988, 1991, 1996
Chambersburg	3	1989, 1994, 2025
Central Dauphin East	1	2014
Steelton-Highspire	1	1982
Altoona	0	
Hollidaysburg	0	
Mifflin County	0	
Red Land	0	

==== Division II/Keystone Division ====
School	Quantity	Years
Bishop McDevitt	12	2008, 2009, 2011, 2012, 2013, 2014, 2015, 2016, 2017, 2021, 2022, 2023
Lower Dauphin	10	1984, 1985, 1992, 1993, 1995, 1998, 2005, 2013, 2020, 2025
Mechanicsburg	5	1982, 1983, 1986, 1994, 2024
Middletown	5	1984, 1987, 1989, 1990, 1991
Red Land	5	1988, 1990, 1996, 1997, 2007
Cedar Cliff	4	2013, 2016, 2018, 2019
Carlisle	3	1998, 1999, 2000
Gettysburg	3	2001, 2004, 2007
Susquehanna Township	3	2006, 2010, 2015
Central Dauphin East	1	2001
East Pennsboro	1	1985
Hershey	1	1990
Milton Hershey	1	1992
Mifflin County	0	
Northern York	0	
Palmyra	0	
Shippensburg	0	
Waynesboro	0	
West Perry	0	

==== Division III/Colonial Division ====
School	Quantity	Years
Northern York	10	1982, 1983, 1984, 1999, 2000, 2004, 2005, 2006, 2007, 2020
Shippensburg	10	1985, 1986, 1988, 2012, 2013, 2016, 2018, 2019, 2021, 2025
East Pennsboro	5	2001, 2002, 2014, 2015, 2023
Gettysburg	4	1993, 1994, 1995, 2022
Susquehanna Township	4	1987, 1988, 1990, 2009
Waynesboro	4	1992, 2014, 2016, 2017
Greencastle-Antrim	3	1998, 2010, 2011
Big Spring	2	1995, 2003
Camp Hill	2	1987, 1988
Susquenita	2	1991, 1995
West Perry	2	1989, 1991
Hershey	1	1996
Mechanicsburg	1	2008
Mifflin County	1	2018
Milton Hershey	1	1997
Trinity	1	2024
Boiling Springs	0	
Delone Catholic	0	
James Buchanan	0	
Middletown	0	
Palmyra	0	
Red Land	0	

==== Division IV/Capital Division ====
School	Quantity	Years
Trinity	6	2004, 2006, 2007, 2010, 2011, 2012
Middletown	5	1999, 2000, 2016, 2017, 2018
Milton Hershey	5	2004, 2013, 2014, 2019, 2025
Steelton-Highspire	5	2006, 2013, 2022, 2023, 2024
Hershey	4	2003
Scotland	4	1993, 1994, 1995, 1996
Boiling Springs	3	2005, 2020, 2021
Bermudian Springs	2	1992, 1997
Camp Hill	2	2004, 2015
Lower Dauphin	2	2002, 2003
Greencastle-Antrim	1	2008
Juniata	1	2024
Mechanicsburg	1	2001
Northern York	1	2009
Susquehanna Township	1	1998
Big Spring	0	
Biglerville	0	
East Pennsboro	0	
Gettysburg	0	
Halifax	0	
James Buchanan	0	
Line Mountain	0	
Newport	0	
Palmyra	0	
Shippensburg	0	
Susquenita	0	
Upper Dauphin	0	
Waynesboro	0	
West Perry	0	

==== Liberty Division ====
School	Quantity	Years
Steelton-Highspire	3	1999, 2000, 2003
Middletown	2	2008, 2009
Boiling Springs	1	2001
Camp Hill	1	1998
Juniata	1	2021
Line Mountain	1	2023
Trinity	1	2002
Upper Dauphin	1	2022
Bermudian Springs	0	
Biglerville	0	
Halifax	0	
James Buchanan	0	
Milton Hershey	0	
Newport	0	
Scotland	0	
Susquenita	0	
Waynesboro	0	

==== Patriot Division ====
School	Quantity	Years
Milton Hershey	1	2009
Steelton-Highspire	1	2008
Camp Hill	0	
Scotland	0	
Trinity	0	
