= Capital Area Intermediate Unit =

School district in Pennsylvania

The Capital Area Intermediate Unit (CAIU) is an Intermediate Unit based in Summerdale, a suburb of Harrisburg, Pennsylvania. The administrative office is located at 55 Miller Street, Enola, East Pennsboro Township, Cumberland County, Pennsylvania. It serves a portion of central Pennsylvania counties, including: Cumberland County, Dauphin County, the northern portion of York County, and Perry County. CAIU15 offers services to: 24 school districts and 2 area vocational technical schools by providing programs and initiatives. It is also known by its IU number, IU No. 15. In addition to funding from local districts, CAIU applies for: private, state and federal grants. The CAIU 15 received more than $17.1 million from the Commonwealth of Pennsylvania in general operating funds in school year 2009–2010. From 2007 through 2011, Amy Morton was the executive director.

The organization is governed by a board of directors and the Pennsylvania Department of Education, as well as the Pennsylvania General Assembly. Each member public school district elects a local board member to also serve on the CAIU board. The CAIU administration develops a budget each year which must be approved not only by the CAIU board, but also by the boards of the majority of its member school districts. CAIU levies no taxes. However it can levy fees for services like its drivers education program. CAIU funding comes from fees charged to member districts for the plethora of services it provides, which include: professional development, curriculum mapping, special education services, speech and hearing services and many others. In 2014, the executive director is Dr. Andria Saia. The assistant executive director Mr. Greg Milbrand. The business manager is Mr. Daren Moran.

CAIU15 operates Capital Area Online Learning Association, which is an online learning program operated in association with the local public schools. CAOLA offers specific careers and professional training. In 2014, the program severed 2,500 pupils in the region. Students remain enrolled in their local public school district while taking courses online. The school reports a 92% completion rate. In 2014, the program was offered in twenty-one public school districts and public charter schools. It also partners with in several other intermediate unit regions, including: (eLearn21 (IU 21); Lancaster Lebanon Virtual Solutions (IU 13); LCS (IU 18); NOLA (IU 19); VLINC (IU 17)).

In accordance with PA Act 89 of 1975, CAIU offers many of its services to local non-public schools. In 2013, approximately 10,000 students residing in Dauphin, Cumberland, and Perry counties attend non-public schools. The CAIU contracts with area public school districts to provide remedial reading to eligible Title I students attending non-public schools.

== Member public school districts ==
- Big Spring School District
- Camp Hill School District
- Carlisle Area School District
- Central Dauphin School District
- Cumberland-Perry Area Vocational-Technical School
- Cumberland Valley School District
- Dauphin County Technical School
- Derry Township School District
- East Pennsboro Area School District
- Greenwood School District (Pennsylvania)
- Harrisburg School District (Pennsylvania)
- Halifax Area School District
- Lower Dauphin School District
- Mechanicsburg Area School District
- Middletown Area School District
- Millersburg Area School District
- Newport School District
- Northern York County School District
- Shippensburg Area School District
- South Middleton School District
- Steelton-Highspire School District
- Susquehanna Township School District
- Susquenita School District
- Upper Dauphin Area School District
- West Perry School District
- West Shore School District

== See also ==
- Capital Area School for the Arts
