= MVSD =

MVSD may refer to:

- Mid Valley School District in Lackawanna County, Pennsylvania
- Mountain View School District in Susquehanna County, Pennsylvania
- Mountain View School Division in the Parkland Region of Manitoba, Canada
