= Carson Long Military Academy =

Former military institute & boarding school

- Carson Long Military Academy - Pennsylvania

Location
- 200 N Carlisle St; New Bloomfield, Perry County, Pennsylvania; United States

Information
- Type: Private, Military Institute, Boarding
- Motto: How to Learn • How to Labor • How to Live
- Established: 1836; 190 years ago
- Founder: Theodore K. Long
- Closed: 2018
- President: Col. John Terrell (USMC) (Ret.)
- Commandant: Col. Karl Bopp (US Army) (Ret.)
- Dean: Col. John Terrell (USMC) (Ret.)
- Headmaster: LTC. Mark Morgan (US Army) (Ret.)
- Grades: 6–12
- Gender: All-male
- Enrollment: 65 (2017)
- Campus type: Rural
- Colors: Red & Blue
- Mascot: Warriors
- Website: www.carsonlong.org

Carson Long Military Academy in New Bloomfield, Pennsylvania, was the oldest continually operating college preparatory boarding school and military academy in the United States with mandatory military training for boys in grades 6–12. Maximum enrollment was approximately 235 student cadets.

== School history ==
Carson Long Military Academy was founded as Bloomfield Academy in 1836 by Robert Finley in New Bloomfield, Pennsylvania as a Latin Grammar school with only six students. In 1840 the school was moved two blocks up the hill to its present location; the first building was constructed the same year and is still in use as a reception hall and museum. In 1842 the trustees decided to make the Academy a coeducational boarding school and for a short period of time in the early 1850s, the school was purchased and operated by the Perry County Commissioners. During the second half of the 19th century, the Latin Grammar Academy added a Normal School, which was a training school for teachers. In 1914 the school was purchased by Theodore K. Long, a graduate of Bloomfield Academy and Yale who became a prominent Chicago lawyer and city councilman. In 1914 he renamed the school Carson Long Institute as a living memorial to his son, William Carson Long, who died in a logging accident at an early age. It had been a nonprofit corporation since 1920 and governed by a 15-member Board of Trustees.

Carson Long Military Academy had been accredited by the Middle States Association of Colleges and Schools since 1929 and was also a member of the Association of Military Colleges and Schools of the United States, the National Association of Independent Schools and the Pennsylvania Association of Independent Schools.

In June 2018 the governing body of the school announced its permanent closure due to insufficient enrollment. In 2020, the campus was purchased by Talmudic University, otherwise known as Rabbi Zweigs yeshiva, based in south Florida. Since 2021, Yeshivas Ohr Reuven has held their summer program on the campus during the first half of the summer, later to be joined by Mechina of South Florida and eventually Mesivta of Cincinnati. Camp Mechaya, a program for Jewish boys, has held its summer sessions at the campus during the second half of the summer. The campus also hosted Camp Yagilu, a Jewish wilderness survival camp, and camp Naaleh.

== Academics ==
The cadets of Carson Long Military Academy were required to complete 21 credits for graduation: English (4 units), mathematics (3 units), science (3 units), social studies (3 units), arts or humanities (2 units), computer science (1 unit) health and physical education (1 unit), and four electives. Electives include such courses as the Bible, speech, and political geography. The average class size of 13 put the teacher-to-students ratio at 1:9 and students received report cards every six weeks.

Physical education and JROTC training were required for all cadets. Cadets were assigned a military rank and higher ranking boys were the leaders of their peers. The military rank system provided inspiration that allowed students to aspire to leadership positions. The cadet corps was organized into a battalion of three companies. The cadet officers, under guidance of faculty, were responsible for the performance of their companies, including discipline, appearance and performance at formations, parades and ceremonies. This peer leadership, along with faculty members serving as role models, had intended to help cadets succeed in college and/or military service. The school also had been designated an Honor School with Distinction (the highest award a JROTC school can receive) by the Department of the Army.

Carson Long offered subjects such as advanced placement math, sciences, and foreign language courses. Glee club, music lessons, "Red & Blue" (the campus newspaper), and "Carsonian" (yearbook) were just a few of the many extracurricular activities available. Cadets could also participate in football, baseball, basketball, tennis, soccer, track and field, wrestling, and rifle team.

== Athletics ==
Carson Long Military Academy offered many Varsity, Junior Varsity, and Club athletics opportunities for students. The Carson Long "Warriors" competed in the PIAA Class A division, against other top school teams from around the state. Carson Long also had a cooperative co-ed athletics program with West Perry High School, allowing members of each school to compete in events not offered by their respective schools, while some students also played football in a cooperative program at nearby Susquenita High School. Athletics opportunities offered include:

=== Varsity Sports ===
- Football (w/ Susquenita H.S.)
- Baseball
- Basketball
- Soccer
- Wrestling
- Tennis
- Track & Field
- Rifle

=== Junior Varsity & Middle School Sports ===
- Boys Soccer
- Boys Basketball
- Boys Wrestling

=== CO-ED Sports ===
- Cross Country
