= Mildred, Pennsylvania =

Unincorporated community in Pennsylvania, US

Coordinates: 41°28′41″N 76°22′42″W

- Unincorporated community
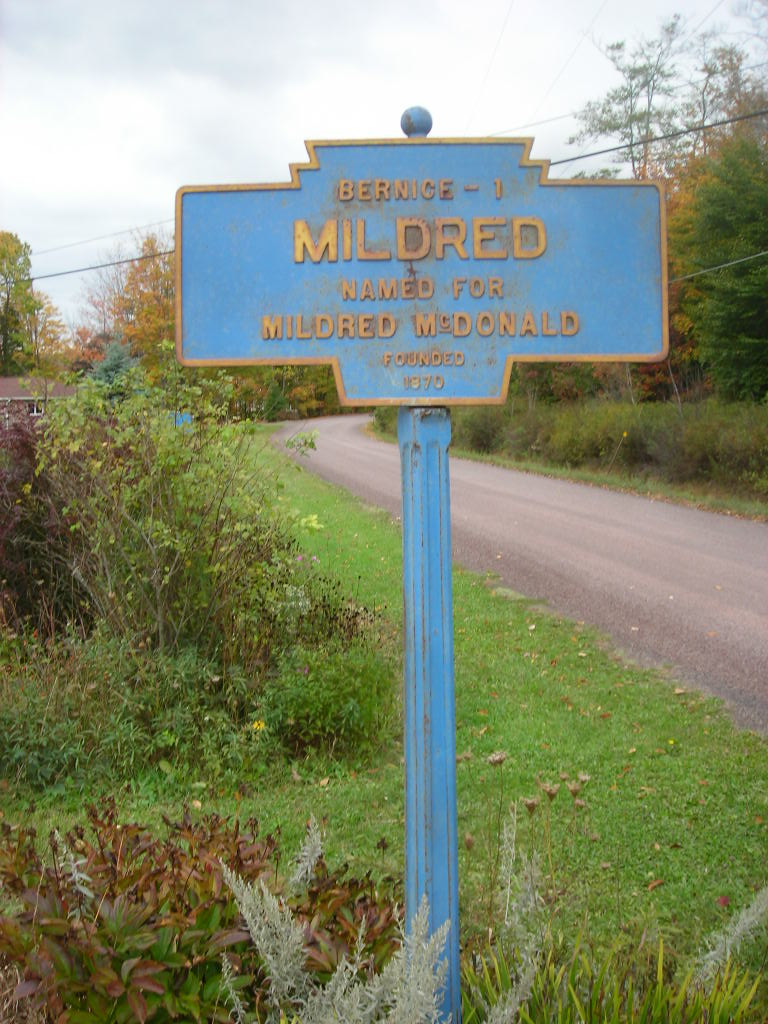
- Keystone Marker for Mildred.
- Interactive map of Mildred, Pennsylvania
- Country: United States
- State: Pennsylvania
- County: Sullivan

Population (2010)
  - Total: 430
- Time zone: UTC-5 (Eastern (EST))
  - Summer (DST): UTC-4 (EDT)
- ZIP codes: 18632

Mildred is an unincorporated community in Cherry Township, Sullivan County, Pennsylvania, United States. It was home to Turnpike Elementary School, one of two elementary schools in the Sullivan County School District prior to consolidation with Sullivan County Elementary School in 2011.

== Demographics ==
Historical population
Census	Pop.	Note	%±

The United States Census Bureau defined Mildred as a census designated place (CDP) in 2023.

As of the 2010 census the population of ZIP code 18632 was 430 people.
