= SMSD =

SMSD can refer to:

- Shawnee Mission School District
- South Middleton School District
- Stafford Municipal School District
