= Dillsburg Banner =

Weekly newspaper in Dillsburg, Pennsylvania, U.S.

The Dillsburg Banner
- Type: Weekly newspaper
- Format: Broadsheet
- Founded: March 11, 1987
- Headquarters: 31 S Baltimore St, Dillsburg, PA 17019
- Circulation: 3900
- Website: DillsburgBanner.net

The Dillsburg Banner is a weekly newspaper of record for the town of Dillsburg located on the northern tip of York County, Pennsylvania. It is published weekly on Thursdays.

The Dillsburg Banner publishes reports on government meetings in the Dillsburg, Franklintown, and Wellsville boroughs, Carroll, Franklin, Monaghan, Warrington, and Washington townships and Northern York County School District. It also publishes family news, features, business reviews, items of public record, legal notices, sports news, and events in and around Mechanicsburg.
