= Newport School District (Pennsylvania) =

School district in Pennsylvania

Coordinates: 40.482°N 77.138°W

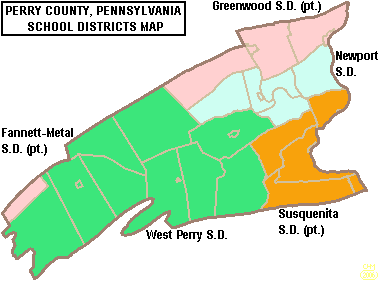
- Newport School District shown in pale blue

Address
- 420 Fickes Lane Newport, Perry County, Pennsylvania, 17074-0009; United States

District information
- Type: Public

Students and staff
- District mascot: Buffalo
- Colors: Blue and white

Other information
- Website: www.newportsd.org

Newport School District is a small, rural, public school district which is situated in the town of Newport, Pennsylvania, located in the eastern section of Perry County along the Juniata River 23 miles (37 km) northwest of Harrisburg, the capital. The district encompasses about 73 square miles (190 km^{2}). The district serves several small communities including: the borough of Newport, Buffalo Township, Howe Township, Juniata Township, Miller Township, and Oliver Township. According to the US Census Bureau, in 2010, Newport School District served a resident population of 7,451 people. According to 2000 federal census data it served a resident population of 7,500 people. The educational attainment levels for the population 25 and over were 85.2% high school graduates and 14.7% college graduates. The district is one of the 500 public school districts of Pennsylvania.

According to the Pennsylvania Budget and Policy Center, 45.1% of the district's pupils lived at 185% or below the Federal Poverty Level as shown by their eligibility for the federal free or reduced price school meal programs in 2012. In 2013, the Pennsylvania Department of Education, reported that 13 students in Newport School District were homeless. In 2009, the district residents’ per capita income was $18,684, while the median family income was $46,240. In Perry County, the median household income was $57,375. In the Commonwealth, the median family income was $49,501 and the United States median family income was $49,445, in 2010. In 2014, the median household income in the USA was $53,700.

Newport School District operates two schools: one PreK–5 elementary school, one 6-12 middle/high school, and the district administrative office. Newport High School students may choose to attend Cumberland Perry Area Vocational Technical School for training in several vocations including: allied health careers, mechanical trades, building trades and culinary arts. Newport School District is served by the Capital Area Intermediate Unit IU15 which offers a variety of services, including a completely developed K–12 curriculum that is mapped and aligned with the Pennsylvania Academic Standards (available online), shared services, a group purchasing program and a wide variety of special education and special needs services.

== Extracurriculars ==
Newport Schools offer a full range of extracurricular activities, including: band and orchestra, chorus, and a wide variety of clubs and organizations. Newport students have represented the district at all levels of competition in both academic and extracurricular pursuits. Eligibility for participation is determined by the school board.

The athletic stadium is named after George Katchmer who coached the school to its only undefeated season in 1953. There is a Buffalo pattern made from rocks displayed proudly behind the field.

Newport School District has an athletic partnership with Greenwood School District for football, track, soccer, and wrestling. Coaches receive compensation as outlined in the teachers' union contract. When athletic competition exceeds the regular season, additional compensation is paid.

The district funds:

Varsity

Boys

- Baseball - A
- Basketball- AA
- Football - AA
- Golf - AA
- Wrestling - AA

Girls

- Basketball - A
- Cheer - AAAA
- Field hockey - AA
- Golf - AA
- Softball - A

Middle school sports

Boys

- Basketball
- Wrestling

Girls

- Basketball
- Field hockey

According to PIAA directory July 2013
