= Tuscarora School District =

School district in Pennsylvania

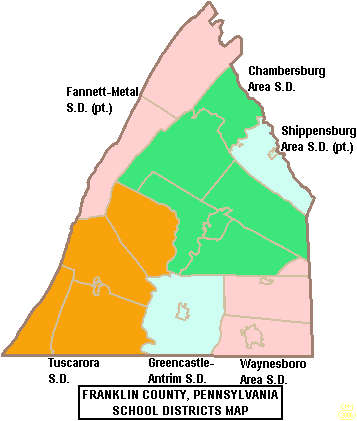

Address
- 100 West Seminary Street Mercersburg, Franklin County, Pennsylvania, 17236; United States

District information
- Type: Public
- Motto: Where every child is known by name

Other information
- Website: www.tus.k12.pa.us

The Tuscarora School District is a midsized, rural, public school district located in Franklin County, Pennsylvania. It serves: the borough of Mercersburg, as well as St. Thomas Township, Peters Township, Montgomery Township, and Warren Township. The district is one of the 500 public school districts of Pennsylvania. Tuscarora School District covers an area of 201 square miles (520 km^{2}), stretching north–south from just south of 40 degrees north latitude to the Maryland border and from east of the 78 degree west longitude line to just west of Chambersburg, Pennsylvania. The district is primarily a rural agricultural area with a total population of approximately 17,000 people. Tuscarora, the name of the mountain on the western boundary, is derived from the Tuscarora Tribe of the Iroquois Confederation. The Tribe came north from the Carolinas about 1713 and settled for a time along the mountains. The name Tuscarora comes from the Indian name Skaruron or hemp gatherers. Conococheague, the name of the creek that flows through the district on its way from the Path Valley south to the Potomac River, is an Indian name from the Delaware Tribe meaning clear water.

According to 2000 federal census data, Tuscarora School District had a resident population of 17,547. By 2010, the district's population was 18,407 people. The educational attainment levels for the school district population (25 years old and over) were 83.9% high school graduates and 14.3% college graduates. In 2009, the district residents' per capita income was $18,384, while the median family income was $46,926. In the Commonwealth, the median family income was $49,501 and the United States median family income was $49,445, in 2010. In Franklin County, the median household income was $51,035. By 2013, the median household income in the United States rose to $52,100.

The Tuscarora School District operates: four K–5 schools (Saint Thomas Elementary School, Mountain View Elementary School, Mercersburg Elementary School, Montgomery Elementary School), James Buchanan Middle School (6th-8th) and James Buchanan Senior High School (grades 9–12). High school students may choose to attend Franklin County Career and Technology Center for training in the construction and mechanical trades. The Lincoln Intermediate Unit IU12 provides the district with a wide variety of services like specialized education for disabled students and hearing, speech and visual disability services and professional development for staff and faculty.

== Extracurriculars ==
The district offers a wide variety of clubs, activities and an extensive sports program.

=== Sports ===
The district funds:

Boys

- Baseball - AAA
- Basketball- AAA
- Cross country - AA
- Football - AAA
- Golf - AAA
- Soccer - AA
- Swimming and diving - AA
- Tennis - AA
- Track and field - AAA
- Wrestling - AAA

Girls

- Basketball - AAA
- Cross country - AA
- Golf - AAA
- Soccer - AA
- Softball - AAA
- Swimming and diving - AA
- Tennis - AA
- Track and field - AA
- Volleyball -AA

Middle school sports

Boys

- Basketball
- Football
- Wrestling

Girls

- Basketball
- Volleyball
- Cheerleading

According to PIAA directory July 2013
