= Middletown Area School District =

School district in Pennsylvania

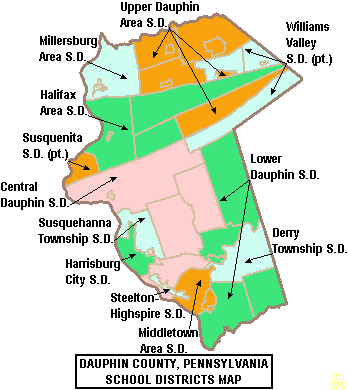
- Location of Middletown Area School District in Dauphin County, Pennsylvania

Address
- 55 West Water Street Middletown, Dauphin County, Pennsylvania, 17057; United States

Other information
- Website: www.raiderweb.org

Middletown Area School District is a small, suburban, public school district located in Middletown, Pennsylvania serving students in a portion of southern Dauphin County. The district includes the boroughs of Middletown and Royalton and Lower Swatara Township in Dauphin County. Middletown Area School District encompasses approximately 17 square miles (44 km^{2}). According to 2000 federal census data, it served a resident population of 18,355. By 2010, the district's population declined to 18,084 people. The educational attainment levels for the Middletown Area School District population (25 years old and over) were 79.2% high school graduates and 13.2% college graduates. The district is one of twelve public school districts operating in Dauphin County and one of the 500 public school districts of Pennsylvania.

According to the Pennsylvania Budget and Policy Center, 38.9% of the district's pupils lived at 185% or below the Federal Poverty level as shown by their eligibility for the federal free or reduced price school meal programs in 2012. In 2009, Middletown Area School District residents' per capita income was $20,611, while the median family income was $49,728. In Dauphin County, the median household income was $52,387. By 2013, the median household income in the United States rose to $52,100.

Middletown Area School District operates five public schools: Middletown Area High School (grades 9–12), Middletown Area Middle School (grades 6–8), Lyall J. Fink Elementary School (grades K–5), John C. Kunkel Elementary School (K–5th) and Robert G. Reid Elementary School (K–5th). Middletown Area School District is served by the Capital Area Intermediate Unit CAIU15 which offers a variety of services, including a completely developed Kindergarten - 12th grade curriculum that is mapped and aligned with the Pennsylvania Academic Standards (available online), shared services, a group purchasing program and a wide variety of special education and special needs services. High school students may choose to attend Dauphin County Technical School for training in the building trades and mechanical trades. The district pays the student's tuition to attend the school.

== History ==
The district planned the opening of Middletown Area Primary School, a consolidation of existing schools. Groundbreaking occurred in 2024.

== Extracurriculars ==
The school district offers a wide variety of clubs, activities and an extensive sports program. The district mascot is a Blue Raider and the colors are blue and gold. The high school and middle school participate in the Pennsylvania Interscholastic Athletic Association. The school's marching band is the Blue Wave Marching Band.

=== Sports ===
The district funds:

Varsity

Boys

- Baseball - AAA
- Basketball - AAA
- Cross country - AA
- Football - AAA
- Golf - AAA
- Soccer - AA
- Tennis - AA
- Track and field - AAA
- Wrestling - AAA

Girls

- Basketball - AAA
- Cross country - AA
- Field hockey - AA
- Soccer - AA
- Softball - AAA
- Swimming and diving - AAA
- Tennis - AA
- Track and field - AAA
- Volleyball - AA

Middle school sports

Boys

- Basketball
- Cross country
- Football
- Soccer
- Track and field
- Wrestling

Girls

- Basketball
- Cross country
- Field hockey
- Track and field

According to PIAA directory July 2014
