= Lower Dauphin School District =

School district school in Pennsylvania, U.S.

Coordinates: 40.20509°N 76.66122°W

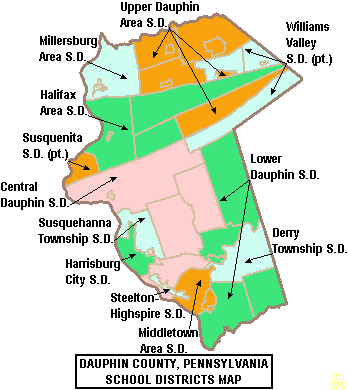
- Location of Lower Dauphin School District in Dauphin County, Pennsylvania

Location
- Dauphin County, Pennsylvania United States

District information
- Type: Public school district
- Grades: K to 12
- Established: 1952

Other information
- District size: 90 sq mi (230 km^{2})
- Website: ldsd.org

Lower Dauphin School District is a midsized, suburban public school district located in Dauphin County, Pennsylvania. The district encompasses approximately 89 square miles (230 km^{2}) and serves the Borough of Hummelstown, as well as the Townships of East Hanover, Londonderry, South Hanover, and Conewago. According to 2000 federal census data, the district served a resident population of 22,546. By 2010, the district's population increased to 24,747 people. The educational attainment levels for the district's population (25 years old and over) were 91.2% high school graduates and 28.2% college graduates. The district is one of the 500 public school districts of Pennsylvania.

According to the Pennsylvania Budget and Policy Center, 20% of the district's pupils lived at 185% or below the Federal Poverty level as shown by their eligibility for the federal free or reduced price school meal programs in 2012. In 2009, the district residents' per capita income was $23,890 a year, while the median family income was $58,643. In Dauphin County, the median household income was $52,371. By 2013, the median household income in the United States rose to $52,100.

Lower Dauphin High School students may choose to attend Dauphin County Technical School for training in the construction and mechanical trades. The district is served by Capital Area Intermediate Unit 15 which offers a variety of services, including a completely developed K-12 curriculum that is mapped and aligned with the Pennsylvania Academic Standards (available online), shared services, a group purchasing program, and a wide variety of special education and special needs services.

== Schools ==
The High School building is located in Hummelstown, as well as its administrative building, Price School building, and one of the elementary schools. The school district was first established in the early 1950s.

Elementary Schools

- Conewago Elementary School
- East Hanover Elementary School – Principal - Mrs. Lindsay Adams
- Londonderry Elementary School
- Nye Elementary School
- South Hanover Elementary School

Secondary Schools

- Lower Dauphin Middle School
- Price School – alternative education and online program grades 6–11
- Lower Dauphin High School

== Extracurriculars ==
The school district offers a wide variety of clubs, activities and an extensive sports program.

=== Sports ===
The district funds:

Boys

- Baseball – AAAA
- Basketball- AAAA
- Cross Country – Class AAA
- Football – AAAA
- Golf – AAA
- Indoor Track and Field – AAAA
- Lacrosse – AAAA
- Soccer – AAA
- Swimming and Diving – Class AAA
- Tennis – AAA
- Track and Field – AAA
- Volleyball – Class AAA
- Wrestling – AAA

Girls

- Basketball – AAAA
- Cheer – AAAA added 2014
- Cross Country – AAA
- Field Hockey – AAA
- Golf – AAA added 2014
- Indoor Track and Field – AAAA
- Lacrosse – AAAA
- Soccer (Fall) – AAA
- Softball – AAAA
- Swimming and Diving – AAA
- Girls' Tennis – AAA
- Track and Field – AAA
- Volleyball – AAA

Middle School Sports

Boys

- Basketball
- Cross Country
- Football
- Soccer
- Track and Field
- Wrestling

Girls

- Basketball
- Cross Country
- Field Hockey
- Softball
- Track and Field

According to PIAA directory July 2014
