= Salisbury-Elk Lick Junior/Senior High School =

Coordinates: 39.75305°N 79.08296°W

Location
- 196 Smith Avenue; Salisbury, Pennsylvania 15558

Information
- School type: Public Junior/Senior High School
- Established: January 21, 1955
- School district: Salisbury-Elk Lick School District
- NCES District ID: 4220760
- NCES School ID: 422076004002
- Principal: Kenneth Fusina
- Teaching staff: 17.28 (FTE)
- Grades: 7–12
- Enrollment: 124 (2023-2024)
- Student to teacher ratio: 7.18
- Colors: Blue and gold
- Athletics conference: PIAA District V
- Team name: Elks
- Communities served: Boynton, Saint Paul, Salisbury, Springs, West Salisbury
- Feeder schools: Salisbury-Elk Lick Elementary School

Salisbury-Elk Lick Junior/Senior High School is a public secondary school located two miles north of the Mason–Dixon line in the town of Salisbury, Somerset County, Pennsylvania. The school was built in 1954 for $550,000, with students first occupying the building on January 21, 1955. The new building consisted of six classrooms and specialized rooms for the commercial department, library, homemaking, music, art, geography, and science, as well as a suite of rooms for industrial arts, a cafeteria, an administrative suite, and a gymnasium/auditorium with seating for nearly 700 people. The building was renovated in the early 21st century.

== Graduation requirements ==
According to the Student Handbook, students attending Salisbury-Elk Lick must earn a minimum of 25 credits in grades 9-12, complete a graduation project, and pass the PSSA exam.

=== Credit structure ===
Subject area	#/credits	Notes
Mathematics	4.0	Includes a Business / Accounting class in grade 12
Social Studies	4.0	
Science	3.0	
English	4.0	
Physical Education	1.75	Must complete .25 credit in freshman year, .5 in sophomore year and 1 credit in either junior or senior year
Health Education	0.5	Completed in sophomore year
Business	1.0	Typing I in freshman year
Driver's Education	0.25	Classroom instruction during sophomore year
Electives	6.50	Minimum requirement of 6.25
Total	25.00	

== Athletics ==
Salisbury-Elk Lick participates in PIAA District V.

Sport	Boys/class	Girls/class
Baseball	Class A	
Basketball	Class A	Class A
Rifle	Class AAAA	
Soccer	Class A	
Softball		Class A
Volleyball		Class A
