= Boiling Springs High School (Pennsylvania) =

Coordinates: 40.152772°N 77.136694°W

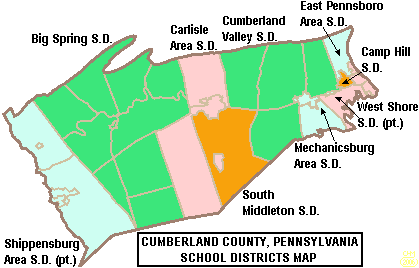

Location
- 21 Academy Street; Boiling Springs, Cumberland County, Pennsylvania 17007; United States

Information
- Type: Public
- Principal: Erin Pittman
- Faculty: 58 teachers (2013)
- Teaching staff: 57.09 (FTE)
- Grades: 9-12
- Enrollment: 707 (2024–2025)
- Student to teacher ratio: 12.38
- Language: English
- Colors: Purple and Gold
- Mascot: Bubbler
- Feeder schools: Yellow Breeches Middle School
- Website: bshs.smsd.us

Boiling Springs High School (BSHS) is a small, rural, public high school in the historic town of Boiling Springs, Pennsylvania. It is part of the South Middleton School District. Boiling Springs High School is the sole high school operated by the district. In the 2024–2025 school year, enrollment was reported as 707 pupils in 9th through 12th grades.

Boiling Springs High School students in 10th, 11th, or 12th grades may choose to attend Cumberland-Perry Area Vocational Technical School for training in the construction and mechanical trades; landscaping fields, computer systems; cosmetology; criminal justice and dental assisting fields. Students earned credits towards graduation, as well as industry certifications and college credits in some classes. The Capital Area Intermediate Unit IU15 provides the district with a wide variety of services like specialized education for disabled students and hearing, speech and visual disability services and professional development for staff and faculty.

The school's colors are purple and gold. Their name and mascot is based on a famous bubbling spring that is the source of a nearby lake.

== Extracurriculars ==
Boiling Springs High School offers a variety of activities, clubs and an extensive athletics program to students. Varsity and junior varsity athletic activities are under the Pennsylvania Interscholastic Athletic Association.

They are also known for their wrestling team who had many finalists in the state tournament.

=== Sports ===
Boiling Springs High School competes in sporting events using the mascot and name "Bubblers".

The district funds:

Boys

- Baseball - AAA
- Basketball - AAA
- Cross country - AA
- Football - AAAA
- Golf - AA
- Soccer - AAA
- Swimming and diving - AA
- Track and field - AAA
- Wrestling - AA

Girls

- Basketball - AAA
- Cross country - AA
- Field hockey - AA
- Soccer (fall) - AA
- Softball - AAA
- Swimming and diving - AA
- Track and field - AA
- Volleyball - AA

According to PIAA directory July 2014
