= Northern High School (Dillsburg, Pennsylvania) =

Location
- 653 South Baltimore Street; Dillsburg, Pennsylvania; United States; 40°05′46″N 77°01′56″W

Information
- Type: Public
- School district: Northern York County School District
- Principal: Steve Lehman
- Faculty: 68.83 (on FTE basis)
- Grades: 9 to 12
- Enrollment: 1,001 (2018–19)
- Student to teacher ratio: 14.54
- Colors: Purple and White
- Mascot: Polar Bear
- Website: Official Website

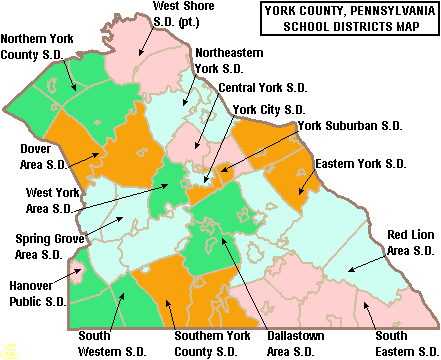
Northern York County School District region in York County

Northern High School is a midsized, suburban public high school located at 653 S Baltimore Street, Dillsburg, Pennsylvania. It is part of the Northern York County School District. According to the National Center for Education Statistics, in the 2018–2019 school year, Northern High School Administration reported an enrollment of 1,001 pupils in grades 9th through 12th.

== Extracurriculars ==
Northern High School students have access to a variety of clubs, activities and sports.

=== Activities ===
Northern High School provides a variety of traditional school activities:

- Caring Team
- DECA - international marketing program
- Envirothon
- FBLA
- FFA
- Key Club
- Gay-Straight Alliance
- History Club
- Miranda Club
- Mock Trial
- Model UN
- Musical Performance Groups
- the PawPrint
- National Art Honor Society
- National Honor Society
- Polar Thon
- Spring Musical
- Student Council
- Tri-M Music Honor Society
- World Language Honor Society
- Yearbook

=== Athletics ===
There is an extensive year round athletics program.

- Baseball
- Basketball - Boys Varsity & JV
- Basketball - Girls Varsity & JV
- Cheerleading
- Cross Country - Boys
- Cross Country - Girls
- Field Hockey
- Football - Varsity & JV
- Football - 9th Grade
- Golf - Boys and Girls
- Indoor Track and Field - Boys and Girls
- Lacrosse - Boys
- Lacrosse - Girls
- Soccer - Boys
- Soccer - Girls
- Softball - Girls
- Swimming & Diving - Boys and Girls
- Tennis - Boys
- Tennis - Girls
- Track & Field Boys and Girls
- VolleyBall - Boys
- Volleyball - Girls
- Wrestling

== Notable alumni ==
- Scott Perry, member of the Pennsylvania House of Representatives
- Anthony Lerew
- Brent Brockman, Professional Soccer Player
- Chris Kilmore
- Cody Eppley
