= Upper Dauphin Area High School =

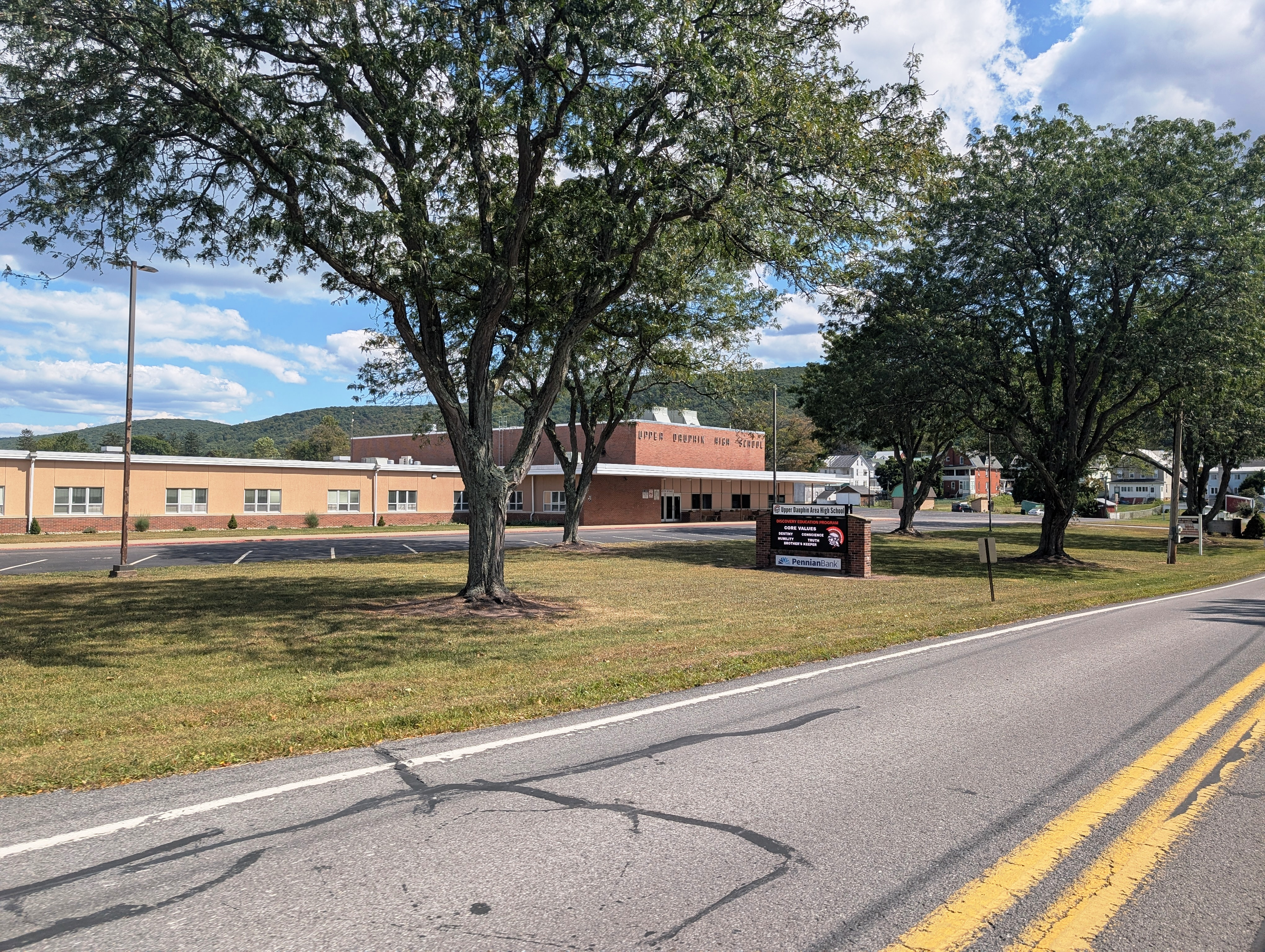

Location
- 220 North Church Street; Elizabethville, Dauphin County, Pennsylvania 17048-8414; United States; 40.5515°N 76.8162°W

Information
- Type: Public
- Principal: Dermot Garrett
- Teaching staff: 23.73 (FTE)
- Grades: 9-12
- Enrollment: 323 (2023-2024)
- Student to teacher ratio: 13.61
- Colors: Orange, black, and white
- Mascot: Trojans
- Website: http://www.udasd.org/

The Upper Dauphin Area High School is a small, rural, public high school. It is the sole high school operated by Upper Dauphin Area School District which is located in Dauphin County, Pennsylvania. The high school serves the boroughs of Lykens, Elizabethville, Gratz, Berrysburg, and Pillow, as well as Jefferson Township, Washington Township, Mifflin Township, and Lykens Township. The Upper Dauphin Area School District encompasses approximately 91 square miles (240 km^{2}).

In 2015, enrollment was 386 pupils in 9th through 12th grades. In 2014, Upper Dauphin Area High School enrollment was reported as 396 pupils in 9th through 12th grades, with 33% of pupils eligible for a free lunch due to family poverty. Additionally, 13.3% of pupils received special education services, while less than 1% of pupils were identified as gifted. The school employed 27 teachers.

The Capital Area Intermediate Unit IU15 provides the school with a wide variety of services like specialized education for disabled students and hearing, speech and visual disability services and professional development for staff and faculty. Students do not have access to vocational and trade education outside of the district's limited program (Agriculture, Job-Seeking Skills and Carpentry).

== Extracurriculars ==
Upper Dauphin Area School District offers a wide variety of clubs, activities and sports.

=== Sports ===
The district funds:

Boys

- Baseball - AA
- Basketball- AA
- Football - A
- Soccer - A
- Track and Field AA
- Wrestling - AA

Girls

- Basketball - A
- Cheer - AAAA (added 2013)
- Soccer (Fall) - A
- Softball - AA
- Track and Field - AA
- Volleyball - A

Middle School Sports

Boys

- Basketball
- Wrestling

Girls

- Basketball

According to PIAA directory July 2012
