= Newport High School (Pennsylvania) =

Coordinates: 40.4804°N 77.1379°W

Location
- 500 Caroline St; Newport, Perry County, Pennsylvania 17074-0009; United States

Information
- Type: Public
- School district: Newport School District
- Principal: Mr. Scott McGrady
- Faculty: 26 teachers
- Grades: 9-12
- Enrollment: 294 (2023–2024)
- Education system: Newport School District
- Language: English
- Colors: Blue and white
- Nickname: Buffaloes
- Communities served: Newport, Pennsylvania
- Feeder schools: Newport Middle School (same building)
- Website: Newport High School

Newport High School is a public high school located in Newport, Pennsylvania. It is part of the Newport School District. Newport High School serves the borough of Newport; Buffalo Township, Howe Township, Juniata Township, Miller Township, and Oliver Township. In 2016, there were 311 pupils in 9th through 12th grades.

== Extracurriculars ==
Newport Schools offer a full range of extracurricular activities, including: sports, band and orchestra, chorus, and a wide variety of clubs and organizations. The athletic stadium is named after George Katchmer who coached the school to its only undefeated season in 1953. There is a Buffalo pattern made from rocks displayed proudly behind the field. Newport School District has an athletic partnership with the Greenwood High School for football, track, soccer, and wrestling. The district funds:

Varsity

Boys

- Baseball - A
- Basketball- AA
- Football - AA
- Golf - AA
- Wrestling - AA

Girls

- Basketball - A
- Cheer - AAAA
- Field hockey - AA
- Golf - AA
- Softball - A

According to PIAA directory July 2013
