= Mountain Athletic Conference (PIAA) =

Pennsylvania high school athletic conference

- Association: PIAA
- No. of teams: 8 (9 in football)
- Country: United States
- Region: Pennsylvania

The Mountain Athletic Conference (MAC or simply Mountain Conference) is a high school athletic conference with the Pennsylvania Interscholastic Athletic Association (PIAA) located in the state of Pennsylvania. The conference is located primarily in the central region of the state. Most of the conferences 9 member schools are located in District 6 of the PIAA, except for Clearfield Area Junior/Senior High School which is a member of District 9, but competes in District 6 athletic competitions. The MAC consists of the Pennsylvania counties of Bedford, Blair, Centre, Clearfield and Huntingdon.

== Member schools (football) ==
School	Location	Nickname	Colors
Bald Eagle Area Middle/High School	Wingate	Eagles	blue & gold
Bellefonte Area High School	Bellefonte	Red Raiders	red & white
Bishop Carroll High School (only in football)	Ebensburg	Huskies	blue & white
Central High School	Martinsburg	Scarlet Dragons	scarlet, gray & white
Clearfield Area Junior/Senior High School	Clearfield	Bison	red & black
Huntingdon Area High School	Huntingdon	Bearcats	blue & red
Penns Valley Area High School	Spring Mills	Rams	blue & white
Philipsburg-Osceola Area Senior High School	Philipsburg	Mountaineers (Mounties)	blue & white
Tyrone Area High School	Tyrone	Golden Eagles	orange, black & white

== PIAA classifications ==
School	Baseball	Basketball (boys)	Basketball (girls)	Football	Soccer (boys)	Soccer (girls)	Softball	Volleyball
Bald Eagle	AAA	AAA	AAA	AAA	AA	AA	AAA	AA
Bellefonte	AAAA	AAAAA	AAAAA	AAAA	AAA	AAA	AAAA	AAA
Central	AAA	AAAA	AAA	AAA	AA	AA	AAA	AAA
Clearfield	AAAA	AAAA	AAAA	AAAA	AAA	AA	AAAA	AAA
Huntingdon	AAA	AAAA	AAAA	AAA	AAA	AAA	AAAAAA	AAA
Penns Valley	AAA	AAA	AAA	AA	AA	AA	AAA	AA
Philipsburg-Osceola	AAA	AAA	AAA	AAA	AAA	AA	AAA	AA
Tyrone	AAA	AAAA	AAA	AAA	AAA	AA	AAA	AA

== See also ==
- High school football
- PIAA Football Teams, Conferences and Leagues
