= Sullivan County School District =

School district in Pennsylvania

Coordinates: 41.41872°N 76.49763°W

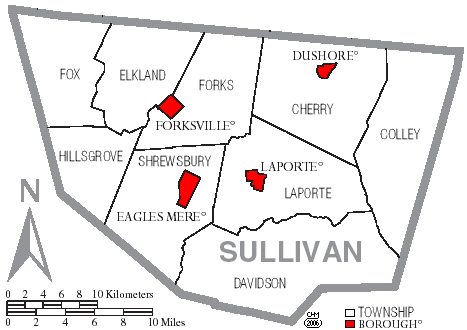
- Map of Sullivan County, Pennsylvania

Address
- 777 South Street Laporte, Sullivan, Pennsylvania, 18626; United States

Other information
- Website: www.sulcosd.k12.pa.us

The Sullivan County School District is a rural public school district which serves the whole of Sullivan County, Pennsylvania. The district operates Sullivan County High School grades 7-12 and the Sullivan County Elementary School K-6. It encompasses approximately 479 square miles (1,240 km^{2}) square miles. According to 2000 federal census data, it served a resident population of 6,556. By 2010, the district's population declined to 6,411 people. The educational attainment levels for the Sullivan County School District population (25 years old and over) were 86.9% high school graduates and 13% college graduates. The district is one of the 500 public school districts of Pennsylvania.

According to the Pennsylvania Budget and Policy Center, 31.5% of the district's pupils lived at 185% or below the Federal Poverty Level as shown by their eligibility for the federal free or reduced price school meal programs in 2012. In 2009, the Sullivan County School District residents’ per capita income was $16,438, while the median family income was $37,196. In the Commonwealth, the median family income was $49,501 and the United States median family income was $49,445, in 2010. In Sullivan County, the median household income was $36,250. By 2013, the median household income in the United States rose to $52,100.

Sullivan County School District operates two schools: Sullivan County Elementary School and Sullivan County Junior Senior High School. Until 2011, the district also operated a second elementary school in Mildred, Pennsylvania. Turnpike Elementary School was closed in June 2011 due to declining enrollment. The former Turnpike Elementary School was a recipient of the 2007 NCLB - Blue Ribbon Schools Award.

Sullivan County Junior Senior High school students may choose to attend Northern Tier Career Center for training in the construction and mechanical trades. The BLaST Intermediate Unit IU17 provides the district with a wide variety of services like specialized education for disabled students and hearing, speech and visual disability services and professional development for staff and faculty.

== Extracurriculars ==
The district's students have access to a variety of clubs, activities and sports.

=== Sports ===
The district funds:

Varsity

Boys

- Baseball - A
- Basketball- A
- Cross Country - A
- Golf - AA
- Soccer - A
- Wrestling - AA

Girls

- Basketball - A
- Cross Country - A
- Golf - AA
- Soccer (Fall) - A
- Softball - A

Junior High School Sports

Boys

- Basketball
- Cross Country
- Soccer
- Wrestling

Girls

- Basketball
- Cross Country
- Softball (Fall)

According to PIAA directory July 2014
