= Big Spring School District =

School district in Pennsylvania

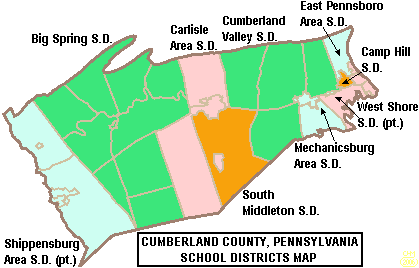
- Map of Cumberland County Pennsylvania School Districts

Address
- 45 Mount Rock Road Newville, Cumberland County, Pennsylvania, 17241-9412; United States

District information
- Type: Public
- Grades: K-12

Other information
- Website: www.bigspringsd.org

The Big Spring School District is a midsized, rural, public school district which serves the residents of the Borough of Newville and Cooke Township, Lower Frankford Township, Lower Mifflin Township, North Newton Township, Penn Township, South Newton Township, Upper Frankford Township, Upper Mifflin Township and West Pennsboro Township in Cumberland County, Pennsylvania. Big Spring School District encompasses approximately 198 square miles (510 km^{2}). By 2010, the district's population increased to 19,098 people. According to 2008 local census data it served a resident population of 18,665. The educational attainment levels for the Big Spring School District population (25 years old and over) were 84.3% high school graduates and 14% college graduates. The district is one of the 500 public school districts of Pennsylvania.

According to the Pennsylvania Budget and Policy Center, 29.8% of the district's pupils lived at 185% or below the Federal Poverty Level as shown by their eligibility for the federal free or reduced price school meal programs in 2012. In 2009, the resident's per capita income was $18,057, while the median family income was $47,347. In the Commonwealth, the median family income was $49,501 and the United States median family income was $49,445, in 2010. By 2013, the median household income in the United States rose to $52,100. The Big Spring School District is one of the 500 public school districts of Pennsylvania.

Big Spring School District operates five schools: Newville Elementary School, Oak Flat Elementary School, Mount Rock Elementary School, Big Spring Middle School and Big Spring High School. High School students may choose to attend Cumberland Perry Area Vocational Technical School for training in the trades. The Capital Area Intermediate Unit IU15 provides the district with a wide variety of services like specialized education for disabled students and hearing, speech and visual disability services, a completely developed K-12 curriculum that is mapped and aligned with the Pennsylvania Academic Standards (available online), shared services, a group purchasing program and professional development for staff and faculty.

Big Spring School District completed construction of a new high school (grades 9–12) in 2003, a new middle school (grades 6–8) in 2005, and operates three elementary schools (grades K-5). One of these elementary schools has recently been renovated, being the middle school, now being an elementary school. In June 2011, the school board closed Plainfield Elementary School.

== Extracurriculars ==
Big Spring School District provides a wide variety of activities, clubs and an extensive, publicly funded, interscholastic athletics program. Varsity and junior varsity athletic activities are under the Pennsylvania Interscholastic Athletic Association. Big Springs School District operates a natatorium that is available for use of the general public facility during non school hours and over most of the summer .

=== Sports ===
The district funds:

High school sports

Boys

- Baseball - AAAAA
- Basketball- AAAAA
- Cross country - AA
- Football - AAAA
- Golf -AAA
- Soccer - AAA
- Swimming and diving - AA
- Track and Field - AAA
- Wrestling - AA

Girls

- Basketball - AAAA
- Cheer - AAAAAA
- Cross country - AA
- Field hockey - A
- Golf - AAA
- Soccer - AAA
- Softball - AAA
- Swimming and diving - AA
- Track and field - AAA
- Volleyball - AAA

Middle school sports

Boys

- Basketball
- Cross country (fall)
- Football
- Soccer (spring)
- Track and field (spring)
- Wrestling

Girls

- Basketball
- Cross country (fall)
- Field hockey
- Soccer (spring)
- Track and field (spring)
- Volleyball

According to PIAA directory October 2017
