= Camp Hill School District =

School district in Pennsylvania

Coordinates: 40.23862°N 76.92610°W

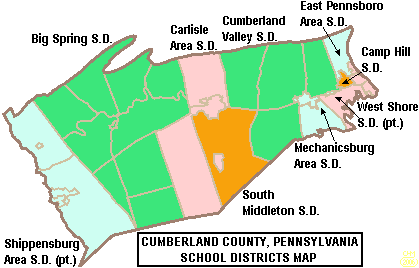

Address
- 418 South 24th Street Camp Hill, Pennsylvania, Cumberland County, 17011; United States

District information
- Type: Public

Students and staff
- Students: 1,233 (2021)
- Faculty: 97 teachers (2020)
- Staff: 96 non teaching staff members
- District mascot: Lion
- Colors: Blue and white

Other information
- Website: www.camphillsd.k12.pa.us

The Camp Hill School District is a diminutive, suburban public school district serving the Borough of Camp Hill in Cumberland County, Pennsylvania At just 2 square miles (5.2 km^{2}), Camp Hill is the smallest school district in Cumberland County and it is one of the smallest in the Commonwealth of Pennsylvania. The district is so small it does not offer school bus transportation and instead encourages students to walk. According to the July 1, 2007 local tax rolls, it serves a resident population of 6,367. By 2010, the district's population increased to 7,903 people. The total median age was 43.0 years compared to 40.1 years in Pennsylvania. The educational attainment levels for the population 25 and over were 96.8% high school graduates and 47.6% college graduates. In 2009, Camp Hill School District residents' per capita income was $28,256, while the median family income was $303,000. Per district officials, it served 1,233 pupils in 2021.

Per District officials, in school year 2007-08 the Camp Hill School District provided basic educational services to 1,137 pupils through the employment of 94 teachers, 81 full-time and part-time support personnel, and six administrators. In 2009–2010, the district provided basic educational services to 1,190 pupils. It employed: 98 teachers, 80 full-time and part-time support personnel, and seven administrators. Camp Hill School District received $2.5 million in state funding in the 2009–2010 school year.

== Schools ==
- Camp Hill High School
- Camp Hill Middle School
- Hoover Elementary School k-2nd grade
- Eisenhower Elementary School and Grace Milliman Pollock Performing Arts Center 3rd-5th
- Schaeffer Elementary School (Closed in June 2011)

Camp Hill High School students may choose to attend Cumberland Perry Area Vocational and Technical School for training in the building trades, culinary arts and allied health services.

== Extracurriculars ==
Camp Hill School District offers a wide variety of clubs, activities and an extensive sports program. Varsity and junior varsity athletic activities are under the Pennsylvania Interscholastic Athletic Association. The district participates in the Mid-Penn Conference and Tri-Valley League.

=== Sports ===
The district funds:

Boys

- Baseball - AA
- Basketball- AA
- Cross country - Class A
- Football - A
- Golf - AA
- Soccer - A
- Swimming and diving
- Tennis - AA
- Track and field
- Wrestling - AA

Girls

- Basketball - AA
- Cross country - Class A
- Field hockey - AA
- Golf - AA
- Soccer (Fall) - A
- Softball - AA
- Swimming and diving
- Tennis - AA
- Track and field - AA

Middle school sports

Boys

- Basketball
- Football
- Soccer
- Wrestling

Girls

- Basketball
- Field hockey

According to PIAA directory July 2012
