= Susquenita School District =

School district in Pennsylvania

Coordinates: 40.35450°N 76.99746°W

Susquenita School District is a midsized, public school district located in Perry County, Pennsylvania and also includes one township in Dauphin County, Pennsylvania. Susquenita School District encompasses approximately 87 square miles (230 km^{2}). Susquenita School District encompasses the boroughs of Marysville, New Buffalo, and Duncannon. It also serves: Watts Township, Wheatfield Township, Penn Township, and Rye Township, as well as Reed Township in Dauphin County.

Susquenita School District operates three schools: Susquenita High School, Susquenita Middle School and Susquenita Elementary School.

== Extracurricular ==
Susquenita School District offers a variety of clubs, activities and an extensive sports program. Susquenita School District is a member of the Mid-Penn Conference for football, and the Tri-Valley League for all other sports and District III of PIAA.

The drama department was nominated for two Hershey Apollo awards (best pit band and best play) and won the award for 2011 best pit band.

=== Sports ===
The district funds:

Boys

- Baseball - AAA
- Basketball- AAAA
- Cross Country - AA
- Football - AAA
- Soccer - AA
- Track and Field - AA
- Wrestling - AA

Girls

- Basketball - AAA
- Cross Country - A
- Field Hockey - A
- Soccer (Fall) - AA
- Softball - AAA
- Track and Field - AA

Junior high school sports

Boys

- Basketball
- Soccer
- Wrestling

Girls

- Basketball
- Field Hockey
- Soccer (fall)

According to PIAA directory July 2012 By 2016 the school board eliminated tennis at the high school and junior high football.
