= Salisbury-Elk Lick School District =

School district in Pennsylvania

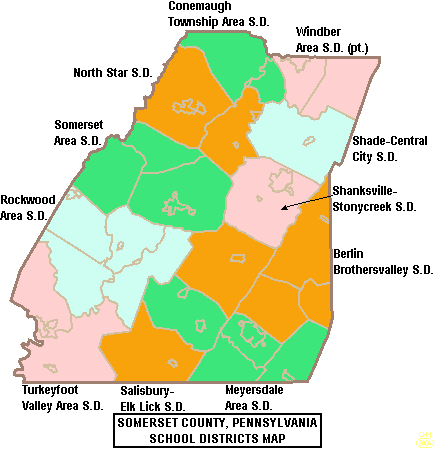

Address
- 196 Smith Avenue, PO Box 68 Salisbury, Pennsylvania, 15558; United States

District information
- Type: Public school district
- Grades: K-12
- Established: 1954

Students and staff
- District mascot: Elks

Other information
- Website: www.selsd.com

The Salisbury - Elk Lick School District is a public school district that serves Salisbury Borough and Elk Lick Township in Somerset County, Pennsylvania. It is located only two miles from the Mason-Dixion Line. The district encompasses approximately 60 square miles. According to 2000 federal census data, it serves a resident population of 3,171.

== Facilities ==
Both the Elementary School and the Junior - Senior High School share a piece of land on Smith Avenue in Salisbury, PA.

Salisbury-Elk Lick Junior/Senior High School serves grades 7 to 12.

The Elementary School was erected in 1973, consolidating the Salisbury Borough, Boynton, Saint Paul, and Springs Schools. The building has all the modern amenities of a standard Elementary School.
