= Millersburg Area School District =

School district in Pennsylvania, United States

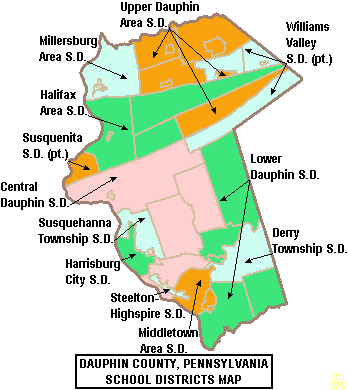
- Location of Millersburg Area School District in Dauphin County, Pennsylvania

Address
- 799 Center Street Millersburg, Dauphin County, Pennsylvania, 17061; United States

District information
- Type: Public

Students and staff
- District mascot: The Indians
- Colors: Maroon and gold

Other information
- Website: www.mlbgsd.k12.pa.us

The Millersburg Area School District is a small, rural, public school district located in the northwestern portion of Dauphin County, Pennsylvania, United States. It encompasses the borough of Millersburg and Upper Paxton Township. Millersburg Area School District encompasses approximately 32 square miles (83 km^{2}). According to 2007 local census data, it served a resident population of 6,420. By the 2010 federal census data, the district's resident population grew to 6,721. The educational attainment levels for the Millersburg Area School District population (25 years old and over) were 82.1% high school graduates and 13.5% college graduates.

According to the Pennsylvania Budget and Policy Center, 33.8% of the District's pupils lived at 185% or below the Federal Poverty level as shown by their eligibility for the federal free or reduced price school meal programs in 2012. In 2009, Millersburg Area School District residents' per capita income was $18,447, while the median family income was $45,919. In the Commonwealth, the median family income was $49,501 and the United States median family income was $49,445, in 2010. By 2013, the median household income in the United States rose to $52,100.

Millersburg Area School District operates one elementary school and one combined junior/senior high school. High school students may choose to attend Dauphin County Vo Tech for training in the construction and mechanical trades. The Capital Area Intermediate Unit IU15 provides the District with a wide variety of services like specialized education for disabled students and hearing, speech and visual disability services and professional development for staff and faculty.

== Extracurriculars ==
Millersburg Area School District offers a wide variety of clubs, activities and an extensive sports program.

=== Sports ===
The District funds:

Boys

- Basketball- AA
- Golf - AA (Co-Op with Halifax, Northern Dauphin Christian, and Upper Dauphin School Districts)
- Soccer - AA (Co-Op with Upper Dauphin School District)
- Track and Field - AA (Co-Op with Upper Dauphin School District)
- Volleyball - A

Girls

- Basketball - AA
- Soccer - AA (Co-Op with Upper Dauphin School District)
- Track and Field - AA (Co-Op with Upper Dauphin School District)
- Volleyball - A

Middle School Sports

Boys

- Basketball

Girls

- Basketball
- Volleyball

According to PIAA directory July 2015
