= Mountain View School District (Pennsylvania) =

School district in Pennsylvania

Coordinates: 41.73868°N 75.72721°W

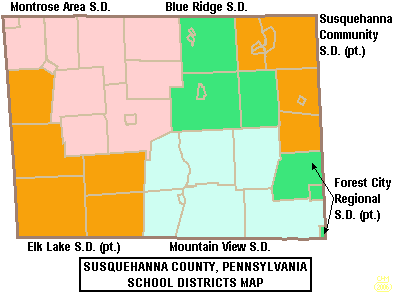

Address
- RR # 1 Box 339A 11748 State Route 106 Kingsley, Susquehanna County, Pennsylvania, 18826; United States

District information
- Type: Public

Students and staff
- District mascot: "Chesty" the Eagle
- Colors: orange and blue

Other information
- Website: www.mvsd.net

Mountain View School District is a small, rural public school district located in Kingsley, Susquehanna County, Pennsylvania, United States. It includes Clifford Township, Lenox Township, Lathrop Township, Gibson Township, Harford Township and Brooklyn Township. Mountain View School District encompasses approximately 196 square miles (510 km^{2}). According to 2000 federal census data, it served a resident population of 8,700 people. By 2010, the District's population increased to 9,117 people. The educational attainment levels for the Mountain View School District population (25 years old and over) were 89.3% high school graduates and 18.6% college graduates. The district is one of the 500 public school districts of Pennsylvania.

According to the Pennsylvania Budget and Policy Center, 48.8% of the District's pupils lived at 185% or below the Federal Poverty Level as shown by their eligibility for the federal free or reduced price school meal programs in 2012. In 2009, the district residents’ per capita income was $17,105, while the median family income was $40,497. In Susquehanna County, the median household income was $48,231. In the Commonwealth, the median family income was $49,501 and the United States median family income was $49,445, in 2010. By 2013, the median household income in the United States rose to $52,100. In 2014, the median household income in the USA was $53,700.

Mountain View School District operates just two schools: an elementary school (K-6) and a junior/senior high school (7-12). High school students may choose to attend the Susquehanna County Career Technology Center for training in the construction and mechanical trades. The Northeastern Educational Intermediate Unit IU19 provides the District with a wide variety of services like: specialized education for disabled students; state mandated training on recognizing and reporting child abuse; speech and visual disability services; criminal background check processing for prospective employees and professional development for staff and faculty.

== Extracurriculars ==
The Mountain View School District provides a wide variety of extracurricular programs, including clubs, activities and sports.

=== Sports ===
Mountain View School District has many sport teams for the students to participate in. The major sport is soccer. The boys varsity soccer team has made their way to states during the 2006-2008 seasons and the 2009-2012 seasons. The girls varsity soccer team won districts periodically. In the 2012-2013 school year, both varsity soccer teams won league titles, districts, and then went on to states. The boys team won the state championship in November 2012, which made them the first Lackawanna League team to win the PIAA State Championship. The boys team also made a return trip to Hershey in 2013.

=== Clubs ===
Mountain View has many clubs, including Student Government Association (SGA), Future Business Leaders of America (FBLA), National Jr. and National Honor Society (NJHS and NHS respectively) as well as a snowriders club.
