= James Buchanan High School =

Coordinates: 41.24614°N 75.87906°W

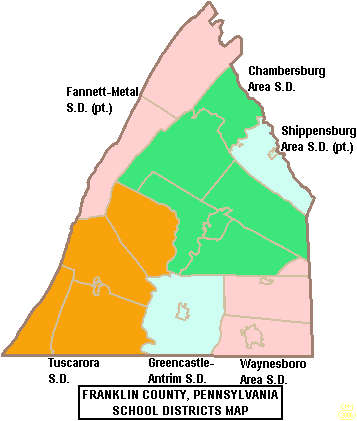

Location
- 4773 Fort Loudon Road; Mercersburg, Franklin County, Pennsylvania 17236-9692; United States
- 39.85442, -77.901417

Information
- Type: Public
- School district: Tuscarora School District
- Teaching staff: 47.70 (FTE)
- Grades: 9–12
- Enrollment: 706 (2023–2024)
- Student to teacher ratio: 14.80
- Language: English
- Color: Green/White
- Mascot: Rocket
- Team name: Rockets

James Buchanan High School is a small, rural public high school in Mercersburg, Pennsylvania and is part of the Tuscarora School District. James Buchanan High School was named after the 15th president of the United States, James Buchanan. In 2013, enrollment was reported as 785 pupils in 9th through 12th grades. The school employed 48 teachers.

== Extracurriculars ==
Tuscarora School District offers a wide variety of clubs, activities and an extensive sports program.

=== Sports ===
The district funds:

Boys

- Baseball - AAA
- Basketball- AAA
- Cross country - AA
- Football - AAA
- Golf - AAA
- Soccer - AA
- Swimming and diving - AA
- Tennis - AA
- Track and field - AAA
- Wrestling - AAA

Girls

- Basketball - AAA
- Cross country - AA
- Golf - AAA
- Soccer - AA
- Softball - AAA
- Swimming and diving - AA
- Tennis - AA
- Track and field - AA
- Volleyball -AA

According to PIAA directory July 2013
