= Susquehanna Township High School =

Coordinates: 40.29998°N 76.84275°W

Location
- 3550 Elmerton Avenue; Harrisburg, PA 17109

Information
- Type: Public high school
- School district: Susquehanna Township School District
- Staff: 56.30 (FTE)
- Grades: 9 to 12
- Gender: Coeducational
- Enrollment: 743 (2022–2023)
- Student to teacher ratio: 13.20
- Colors: Red and white
- Athletics conference: PIAA
- Mascot: currently undefined (previously Indian)
- Community: Susquehanna Township, Dauphin County, Pennsylvania
- Website: hs.hannasd.org

Susquehanna Township High School (STHS) is a mid-sized, public high school located in Harrisburg, Pennsylvania serving students from Susquehanna Township. The school provides grades 9 through 12. In the 2021–22 school year, the school had 758 pupils.

== Extracurriculars ==
Susquehanna Township School District offers a wide variety of clubs, activities and an extensive competitive sports program.

=== Sports ===
According to the PIAA directory in October 2023, the district funds:

Boys

- Baseball - AAAAA
- Basketball- AAAAA
- Cross Country - AA
- Football - AAAA
- Golf - AAA
- Indoor Track and Field - AAAA
- Soccer - AAA
- Swimming and Diving - AA
- Tennis - AAA
- Track and Field - AAA
- Wrestling - AAA

Girls

- Basketball - AAAAA
- Cross Country - AAA
- Field Hockey - AA
- Golf - AAA
- Indoor Track and Field - AAAA
- Soccer - AAA
- Softball - AAA
- Swimming and Diving - AA
- Tennis - AAA
- Track and Field - AAA

== Notable alumni ==
- Joseph Berger, internist and neurologist
- Marques Colston, former wide receiver for the New Orleans Saints of the NFL
- Timothy DeFoor, Pennsylvania Auditor General
- Justin C. Fleming, Member of the Pennsylvania House of Representatives
- Ellen Greenberg, teacher, died either of suicide or homicide
- Jeffrey Piccola, Pennsylvania State Representative and State Senator
- Bob Rosenschein, American-Israeli internet entrepreneur
- ImeIme Umana, lawyer, first African-American woman elected president of the Harvard Law Review
