= South Middleton School District =

School district in Pennsylvania

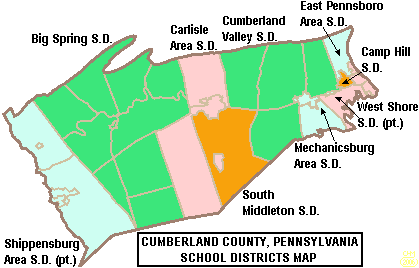

Address
- 4 Academy Street, Suite 100 Boiling Springs, Cumberland County, Pennsylvania, 17007; United States

District information
- Type: Public

Students and staff
- District mascot: Bubblers
- Colors: Purple and gold

Other information
- Website: www.smsd.us

South Middleton School District is a mid-sized, rural, public school district located in Boiling Springs, Pennsylvania. It also serves residents of South Middleton Township. South Middleton School District encompasses approximately 51 square miles (130 km^{2}). South Middleton School District serves grades (K–12). According to 2000 federal census data, it served a resident population of 12,939. By 2010 the population had risen to 14,695 residents. The educational attainment levels for the school district population (25 years old and over) were 92.9% high school graduates and 33.1% college graduates.

In 2009, South Middleton School District residents' per capita income was $24,370, while the median family income was $60,511 a year. In the Commonwealth, the median family income was $49,501 and the United States median family income was $49,445, in 2010. In Cumberland County, the median household income was $51,035. By 2013, the median household income in the United States rose to $52,100.

South Middleton School District operates four schools: W.G. Rice Elementary School (grades k-2), Iron Forge Elementary School (grades 3-5), Yellow Breeches Middle School and Boiling Springs High School. High school students may choose to attend Cumberland Perry Area Vocational Technical School for training in the construction and mechanical trades. The district is served by the Capital Area Intermediate Unit 15, which offers a variety of services, including a completely developed K–12 curriculum that is mapped and aligned with the Pennsylvania Academic Standards (available online), shared services, a group purchasing program and a wide variety of special education and special needs services.

Iron Forge Elementary, Yellow Breeches Middle School, and Boiling Springs High School are all located in close proximity to each other, while W.G. Rice Elementary School is located in the outskirts of Mount Holly Springs, PA.

== Extracurriculars ==
South Middleton School District provides a wide variety of activities, clubs and an extensive sports program. Varsity and junior varsity athletic activities are under the Pennsylvania Interscholastic Athletic Association

=== Sports ===
The district funds:

Boys

- Baseball - AAA
- Basketball - AAA
- Cross country - AA
- Football - AA
- Golf - AA
- Soccer - AA
- Swimming and diving - AA
- Track and field - AA
- Wrestling - AA

Girls

- Basketball - AAA
- Cross country - AA
- Field hockey - AA
- Soccer - AA
- Softball - AAA
- Swimming and diving - AA
- Track and field - AA
- Volleyball - AA

Middle school sports

Boys

- Basketball
- Cross country
- Football
- Track and field
- Wrestling

Girls

- Basketball
- Cross country
- Field hockey
- Track and field
- Volleyball

According to PIAA directory July 2012
