= Upper Dauphin School District =

School district in Pennsylvania

Coordinates: 40.58214°N 76.80198°W

Upper Dauphin Area School District
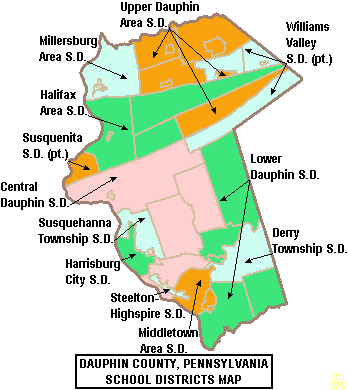
- Location of Upper Dauphin School District in Dauphin County, Pennsylvania

Address
- 5668 State Route 209 Lykens, Dauphin County, Pennsylvania, 17048-8414; United States

District information
- Type: Public

Students and staff
- District mascot: Trojans
- Colors: Orange, black and white

Other information
- Website: www.udasd.org

The Upper Dauphin Area School District is a small, rural, public school district located in Dauphin County, Pennsylvania. It is fragmented in four discontinuous pieces, including: the boroughs of Lykens, Elizabethville, Gratz, Berrysburg, and Pillow, as well as Jefferson Township, Washington Township, Mifflin Township, and Lykens Township. Upper Dauphin Area School District encompasses approximately 91 square miles (240 km^{2}). According to 2007 local census data, it serves a resident population of 9,723 people. By 2010, the district's population was 9,759 people. The educational attainment levels for the district's population aged 25 years and over were 81.4% high school graduates and 10.6% college graduates.

According to the Pennsylvania Budget and Policy Center, 38% of the district's pupils lived at 185% or below the Federal Poverty level as shown by their eligibility for the federal free or reduced price school meal programs in 2012. In 2009, the district residents' per capita income was $18,098, while the median family income was $45,231. In Dauphin County, the median household income was $52,371. In the Commonwealth of Pennsylvania, the median family income was $49,501 and the United States median family income was $49,445, in 2010.

Upper Dauphin Area School District operates three schools: Upper Dauphin Area Elementary School, Upper Dauphin Area Middle School, and Upper Dauphin Area High School.

== Extracurriculars ==
Upper Dauphin Area School District offers a wide variety of clubs, activities and sports.

=== Sports ===
The district funds:

Boys

- Baseball - AAA (Co-Op with Millersburg Area School District
- Basketball- AAA
- Cross-Country - AAA (Co-Op with Millersburg Area School District)
- Football - AAA (Co-Op with Millersburg Area School District)
- Wrestling - AAA (Co-Op with Millersburg Area School District)

Girls

- Basketball - AAA
- Cheer - AAAA (Co-Op with Millersburg Area School District)
- Cross-Country - AAA (Co-Op with Millersburg Area School District)
- Softball - AAA (Co-Op with Millersburg Area School District)
- Volleyball - AAA
- Wrestling - AAA (Co-Op with Millersburg Area School District)

Middle school sports

Boys

- Basketball
- Wrestling

Girls

- Basketball

According to PIAA directory July 2012
