= Susquehanna Township School District =

School district in Pennsylvania

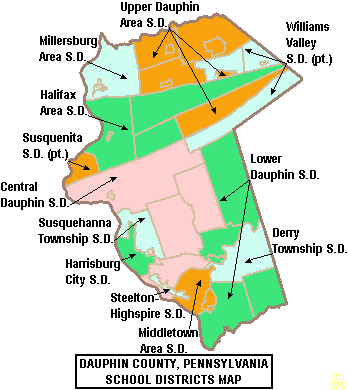
- Location of Susquehanna Township School District in Dauphin County, Pennsylvania

Address
- 3550 Elmerton Avenue Harrisburg, Dauphin County, Pennsylvania, 17110-1131; United States
- Coordinates: 40.3000°N 76.8426°W

Other information
- Website: www.hannasd.org

The Susquehanna Township School District is a midsized, suburban, public school district serving students from Susquehanna Township, Dauphin County, Pennsylvania. The school district is located in suburban Harrisburg, Pennsylvania. The Susquehanna Township School District encompasses approximately 17 square miles (44 km^{2}). According to a June 2008 local census data, it serves a resident population of 22,977 people. In 2010, the District's population had grown to 24,047 people, per the United States Census Bureau. The educational attainment levels for the Susquehanna Township School District population (25 years old and over) were 91.3% high school graduates and 34.6% college graduates.

According to the Pennsylvania Budget and Policy Center, 35.5% of the District's pupils lived at 185% or below the Federal Poverty level as shown by their eligibility for the federal free or reduced price school meal programs in 2012. In 2009, Susquehanna Township School District residents' per capita income was $26,572 a year, while the median family income was $61,781 a year. In the Commonwealth, the median family income was $49,501 and the United States median family income was $49,445, in 2010. In Dauphin County, the median household income was $52,371. By 2013, the median household income in the United States rose to $52,100.

Susquehanna Township School District operates:

- Sara Lindemuth/Anna Carter Primary School K-2nd
- Thomas Holtzman Elementary School 3rd–5th
- Susquehanna Township Middle School 6th-8th
- Susquehanna Township High School 9th-12th

High school students may choose to attend Dauphin County Technical School for training in the construction and mechanical trades.

== Extracurriculars ==
Susquehanna Township School District offers a variety of clubs, activities and an extensive sports program.

=== Sports ===
The District funds:

Boys

- Baseball - AAA
- Basketball- AAA
- Cross Country - AA
- Football - AAA
- Golf - AAA
- Indoor Track and Field - AAAA
- Soccer - AA
- Swimming and Diving - AA
- Tennis - AA
- Track and Field - AAA
- Wrestling - AAA

Girls

- Basketball - AAA
- Cheer - AAAA
- Cross Country - AA
- Indoor Track and Field - AAAA
- Field Hockey - AA
- Golf - AAA
- Soccer (Fall) - AA
- Softball - AAA
- Swimming and Diving - AA
- Tennis - AA
- Track and Field - AAA

Middle School Sports

Boys

- Basketball
- Cross Country
- Soccer
- Track and Field
- Wrestling

Girls

- Basketball
- Cross Country
- Field Hockey
- Soccer (Fall)
- Track and Field

According to PIAA directory July 2015
