= Susquenita High School =

School in Duncannon, Pennsylvania, United States

Coordinates: 40.35486°N 77.00195°W

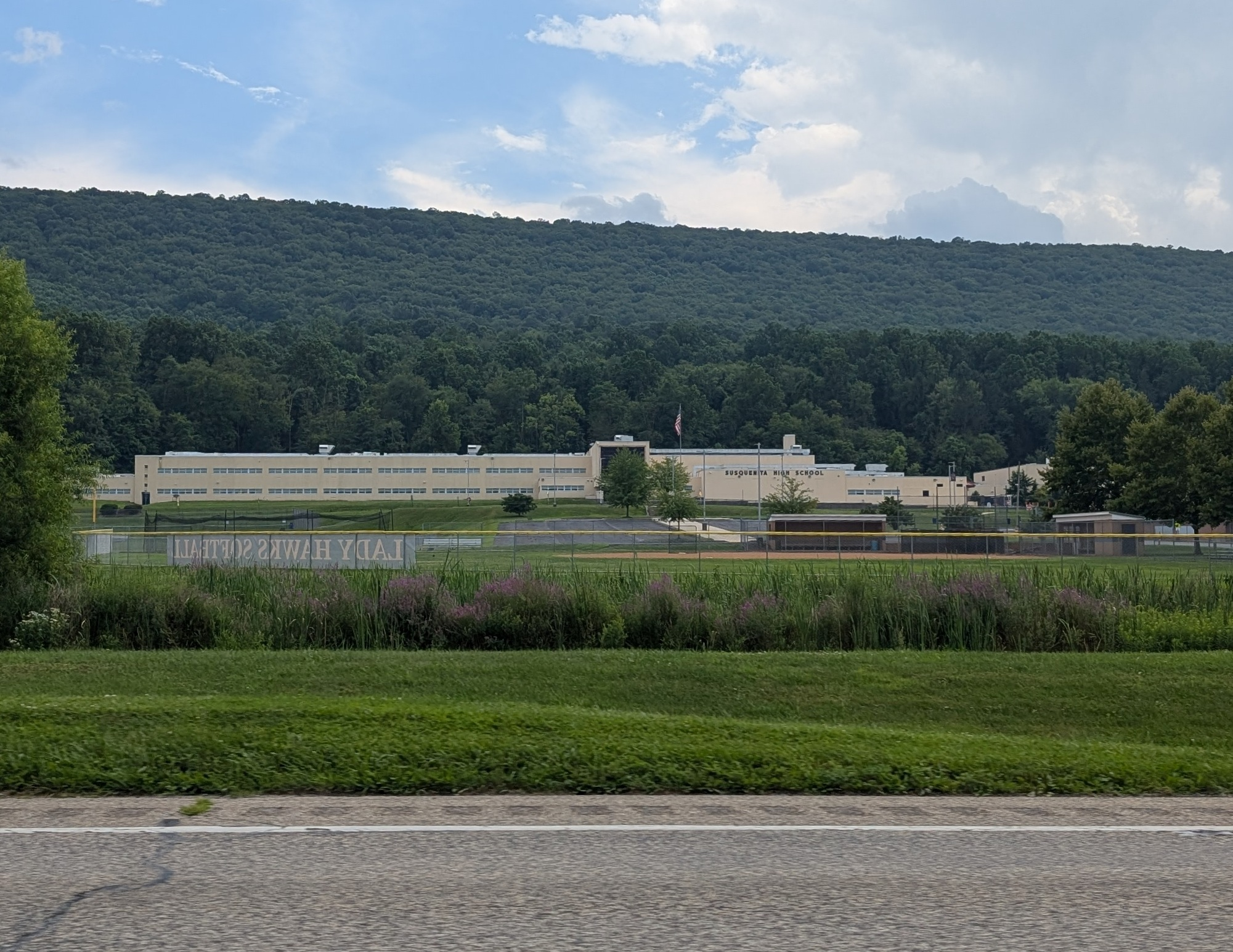
- Front of the school as seen from US 11/US 15

Location
- 309 Schoolhouse Road; Duncannon, Perry County and Dauphin County, Pennsylvania 17020; United States

Information
- Type: Public
- Established: 1953
- Principal: Craig Funk
- Staff: 41.13 (FTE)
- Grades: 9th-12th
- Enrollment: 493 (2023–2024)
- Student to teacher ratio: 11.99
- Colors: black and orange
- Feeder schools: Susquenita Middle School
- Website: http://www.susq.k12.pa.us/

Susquenita High School is a small, rural, public high school located in Duncannon, Perry County, Pennsylvania. It is the sole high school operated by the Susquenita School District. Susquenita High School serves the boroughs of Marysville, New Buffalo, and Duncannon. It also serves: Watts Township, Wheatfield Township, Penn Township, and Rye Township, as well as Reed Township in Dauphin County.

== Extracurriculars ==
Susquenita High School offers a variety of clubs, activities and an extensive sports program.

Arts

The drama department was nominated for two Hershey Apollo awards (best pit band and best play) and won the award for 2011 best pit band. In 2016, a senior was awarded outstanding lead actress for her portrayal of Ebenezer Scrooge.

Since 2008, the West Side Singers, Susquenita's auditioned choir has received a top rating of Superior at its annual adjudication trip. While competing in Boston at Festivals of Music, not only did all choirs receive a Superior rating but the Women's Choir won the Best Overall Choir Award. This group has been chosen to perform at the PA Music Educators Conference in Hershey, PA in 2015.

=== Sports ===
The district funds:

Boys

- Baseball - AAA
- Basketball- AAAA
- Cross country - AA
- Football - AAA
- Soccer - AA
- Tennis - AA
- Track and field - AA
- Wrestling - AA

Girls

- Basketball - AAAA
- Cross country - AA
- Field hockey - A
- Soccer - AA
- Softball - AAA
- Track and field - AA
- Wrestling - AAAA

According to PIAA directory October 2025
