= Northern York County School District =

School district in Pennsylvania

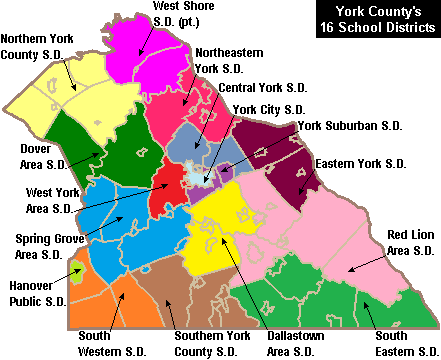

Address
- 650 S. Baltimore Street Dillsburg, York County, Pennsylvania, 17019; United States
- Coordinates: 40.0987° N, 77.0350° W

District information
- Type: Public
- Established: 1905

Students and staff
- District mascot: Polar Bear
- Colors: Purple, white

Other information
- Website: www.northernpolarbears.com

The Northern York County School District is a midsized, suburban public school district in York County, Pennsylvania. It includes the Boroughs of Dillsburg, Franklintown, and Wellsville; as well as the Townships of Carroll, Franklin, Monaghan, Warrington, and Washington. The school district has a population of 20,023, according to a 2005 local census. By 2010, the district's population had increased to 21,108 people. The educational attainment levels for the Northern York County School District population (25 years old and over) were 91.9% high school graduates and 29.8% college graduates.

Northern York County School District was founded in 1905 when a high school course was instituted. The original administration building was created in 1914, which also served as elementary and secondary education. In 1953, it then split students into the Northern York Joint Junior-Senior High School. A senior high school was also created, which served its purpose until 2002, where the new Northern High School was built directly across from it. The senior high school now serves as the administration building. The older high school is now currently the Northern Middle school.

According to the Pennsylvania Budget and Policy Center, 20.6% of the district's pupils lived at 185% or below the Federal Poverty level as shown by their eligibility for the federal free or reduced price school meal programs in 2012. In 2009, the district residents' per capita income was $22,758, while the median family income was $55,258. In the Commonwealth, the median family income was $49,501 and the United States median family income was $49,445, in 2010. In York County, the median household income was $58,745. By 2013, the median household income in the United States rose to $52,100.

Special education was provided by the district and the Capital Area Intermediate Unit #15. Occupational training and adult education in various vocational and technical fields were provided by the district and the Cumberland-Perry Area Vocational-Technical School.

Northern York County School District operates: four K-5th elementary schools: (Dillsburg Elementary School, Northern Elementary School, South Mountain Elementary School, Wellsville Campus); Northern Middle School (6th–8th), and Northern High School (9th–12th). High school students may choose to attend Cumberland Perry Area Vocational Technical School for training in the construction and mechanical trades.

In 2012, the Washington Township Educational Coalition filed a petition with the Court of Common Pleas of York County, Pennsylvania, to initiate the process of transferring Washington Township from the Dover Area School District to the Northern York County School District. The petitioners cited the superior education outcomes and lower property taxes in Northern County School District as motives for the change request. Estimates project a net gain of $800,000 to $1 million over the next five years to Northern York County School District if the change were approved. After initially denying the petition in March 2017, the State Board of Education issued an order on March 10, 2021, transferring Washington Township to the Northern York County School District effective with the 2021–2022 school year.

== Extracurriculars ==
Northern York County School District's students have access to a variety of clubs, activities and an extensive sports program. Eligibility for participation is determined by the school board policy, which includes criteria on school attendance and academic performance. The district is part of the Mid-Penn Conference for sports.

=== Sports ===
The district funds:

Boys:

- Baseball – AAA
- Basketball- AAAA
- Cross Country – AAA
- Football – AAA
- Golf – AAA
- Indoor Track and Field – AAAA
- Lacrosse – AAAA
- Soccer – AAA
- Swimming and Diving – AAA
- Tennis – AAA
- Track and Field – AAA
- Volleyball – AA
- Wrestling – AAA

Girls:

- Basketball – AA
- Cheerleading – AAA
- Cross Country – AA
- Indoor Track and Field – AAAA
- Field Hockey – AA
- Golf – AAA
- Lacrosse – AAAA
- Soccer (Fall) – AA
- Softball – AAA
- Swimming and Diving – AAA
- Girls' Tennis – AAA
- Track and Field – AAA
- Volleyball – AA

Middle School sports:

Boys:

- Basketball
- Cross Country
- Football
- Soccer
- Track and Field
- Wrestling

Girls:

- Basketball
- Cross Country
- Field Hockey
- Soccer (Fall)
- Track and Field
- Volleyball
