= Shippensburg Area School District =

School district in Pennsylvania

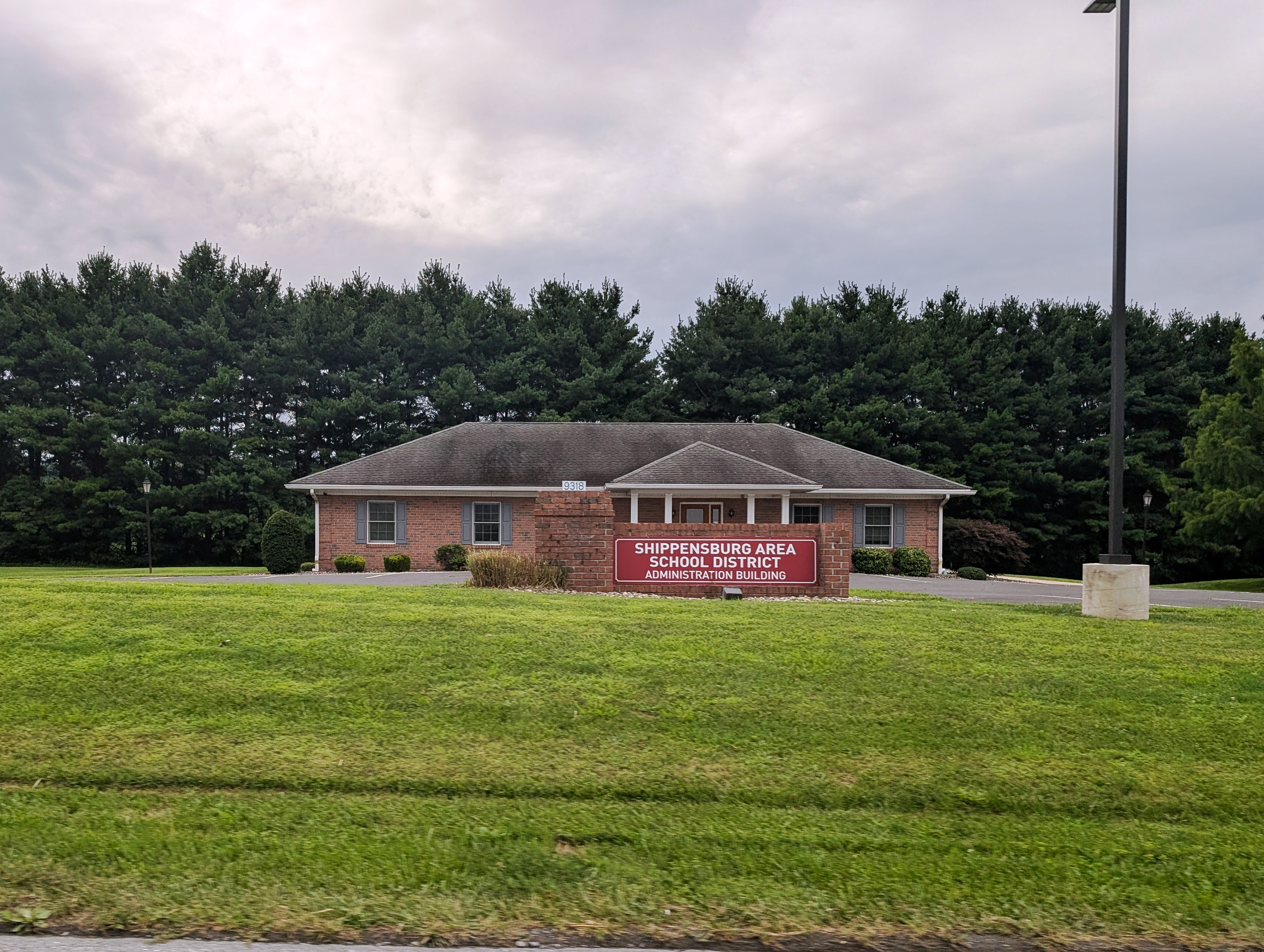
- District Administration Building

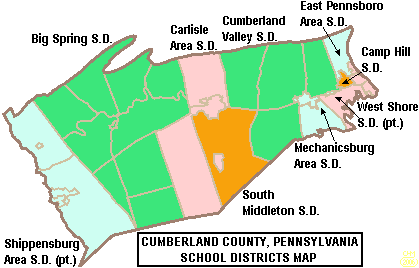

Address
- 317 North Morris Street Shippensburg, Cumberland County and Franklin County, Pennsylvania, 17257; United States

District information
- Type: Public

Students and staff
- District mascot: Greyhound
- Colors: maroon and grey

Other information
- Website: www.shipk12.org

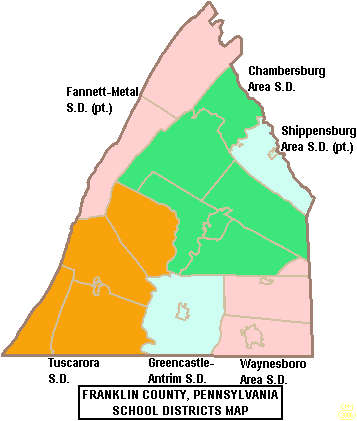
Shippensburg Area School District region in Franklin County

The Shippensburg Area School District is a midsized, rural, public school district in Franklin County, Pennsylvania and Cumberland County, Pennsylvania. It is centered on the borough of Shippensburg and also serves Newburg, Hopewell Township, Shippensburg Township, and Southampton Township in Cumberland County and the adjacent and similarly named but independently governed Southampton Township along with Orrstown in Franklin County. Shippensburg Area School District encompasses approximately 121 square miles (310 km^{2}). According to 2000 federal census data it serves a resident population of 23,714 people. By 2010, the District's population increased to 28,243 people. In 2009, the District residents’ per capita income was $15,113, while the median family income was $45,273. In the Commonwealth, the median family income was $49,501 and the United States median family income was $49,445, in 2010.

The District partners with Shippensburg University in developing its academic programs of study and continuing education for the teachers.

== Extracurriculars ==
The Shippensburg Area School District offers a variety of clubs, activities and an extensive sports program.

=== Sports ===
The District Funds:

Boys	Girls
Baseball - AAA	Basketball - AAA
Basketball - AAAA	Cross Country - AAA
Cross Country - AAA	Field Hockey - AAA
Football - AAA	Soccer (Fall) - AAA
Golf - AAA	Softball - AAA
Soccer - AAA	Swimming and Diving - AA
Swimming & Diving - AAA	Track and Field - AAA
Track and Field - AAA	Volleyball - AAA
Wrestling - AAA	

==== Middle School Sports ====
Boys	Girls
Basketball	Basketball
Cross Country	Cross Country
Football	Field Hockey
Soccer	Soccer (Fall)
Wrestling	Volleyball

According to PIAA directory July 2012
