= List of places in Pennsylvania: H–I =

This list of cities, towns, unincorporated communities, counties, and other recognized places in the U.S. state of Pennsylvania also includes information on the number and names of counties in which the place lies, and its lower and upper zip code bounds, if applicable.

Name of place	Number of counties	Principal county	Lower zip code	Upper zip code
Haafsville	1	Lehigh County	18031	
Haags Mill	1	Wayne County		
Haas	1	Schuylkill County		
Hackett	1	Washington County	15367	
Hacklebernie	1	Carbon County	18229	
Hackney	1	Washington County		
Haddenville	1	Fayette County	15401	
Haddock	1	Schuylkill County	18201	
Hadley	1	Mercer County	16130	
Haffey	1	Allegheny County	15147	
Hagero	1	Somerset County		
Hagersville	1	Bucks County	18944	
Hahnstown	1	Lancaster County	17522	
Hahntown	1	Westmoreland County	15642	
Haines Acres	1	York County	17402	
Haines Township	1	Centre County		
Hale	1	Clearfield County		
Haleeka	1	Lycoming County	17728	
Half Falls	1	Perry County		
Halfmoon Township	1	Centre County		
Halford Hills	1	Montgomery County	19401	
Halfville	1	Lancaster County	17543	
Halfway	1	Lebanon County	17042	
Halfway House	1	Montgomery County		
Halifax	1	Dauphin County	17032	
Halifax Township	1	Dauphin County		
Hall	1	Allegheny County	15146	
Hallam	1	York County	17406	
Hallman	1	Chester County		
Hallowell	1	Montgomery County	19044	
Halls	1	Lycoming County	17756	
Hallstead	1	Susquehanna County	18822	
Hallston	1	Butler County	16057	
Hallton	1	Elk County	15860	
Hallwood	1	Luzerne County	18621	
Halsey	1	McKean County	16735	
Hamburg	1	Berks County	19526	
Hametown	1	York County	17327	
Hamill	1	Indiana County	15771	
Hamilton	1	Jefferson County	15744	
Hamilton	1	Northumberland County	17801	
Hamilton Park	1	Lancaster County	17603	
Hamilton Square	1	Monroe County	18360	
Hamilton Township	1	Adams County		
Hamilton Township	1	Franklin County		
Hamilton Township	1	McKean County		
Hamilton Township	1	Monroe County		
Hamilton Township	1	Tioga County		
Hamiltonban Township	1	Adams County		
Hamlin	1	Lebanon County	17026	
Hamlin	1	Wayne County	18427	
Hamlin Station	1	McKean County		
Hamlin Township	1	McKean County		
Hammersley Fork	1	Clinton County	17764	
Hammett	1	Erie County	16510	
Hammond	1	Tioga County	16946	
Hammondville	1	Fayette County	15666	
Hamorton	1	Chester County	19348	
Hampden	1	Berks County	19604	
Hampden	1	Cumberland County	17055	
Hampden Heights	1	Berks County		
Hampden Township	1	Cumberland County		
Hampshire Heights	1	Westmoreland County	15601	
Hampton	1	Adams County	17350	
Hampton Station	1	Venango County		
Hampton Township	1	Allegheny County		
Hampton Township	1	Allegheny County		
Hancock	1	Berks County	19539	
Haneyville	2	Clinton County	17745	
Haneyville	2	Lycoming County	17745	
Hanlin	1	Washington County	15021	
Hann Hill	1	Mercer County		
Hannah	1	Centre County		
Hannahstown	1	Butler County	16023	
Hannastown	1	Westmoreland County	15635	
Hannasville	1	Venango County	16314	
Hanover	1	Luzerne County	18634	
Hanover	1	Northampton County	18017	
Hanover	1	York County	17331	
Hanover Acres	1	Lehigh County		
Hanover Green	1	Luzerne County	18702	
Hanover Heights	1	Chester County	19464	
Hanover Junction	1	York County	17360	
Hanover Township	1	Beaver County		
Hanover Township	1	Lehigh County		
Hanover Township	1	Luzerne County		
Hanover Township	1	Northampton County		
Hanover Township	1	Washington County		
Hanoverdale	1	Dauphin County	16036	
Hanoverville	1	Northampton County		
Hansotte Plan	1	Armstrong County	16226	
Happy Valley	1	Luzerne County	18643	
Harbor	1	Lawrence County	16101	
Harborcreek	1	Erie County	16421	
Harborcreek Township	1	Erie County		
Harbor Creek	1	Erie County		
Harbor Woods	1	Chester County	19341	
Harding	1	Luzerne County	18615	
Hardpen	1	Luzerne County		
Hardy	1	Allegheny County		
Hardy Hill	1	Fayette County		
Harford	1	Susquehanna County	18823	
Harford Heights	1	Westmoreland County	15642	
Harford Township	1	Susquehanna County		
Harkness	1	Bradford County		
Harlan	2	Clarion County		
Harlan	2	Jefferson County		
Harlansburg	1	Lawrence County	16101	
Harleigh	1	Luzerne County	18225	
Harlem	1	Berks County	19504	
Harleysville	1	Montgomery County	19438	
Harmar	1	Allegheny County		
Harmar Heights	1	Allegheny County	15024	
Harmar Township	1	Allegheny County		
Harmarville	1	Allegheny County	15238	
Harmonsburg	1	Crawford County	16422	
Harmontown	1	Potter County		
Harmonville	1	Montgomery County	19428	
Harmony	1	Butler County	16037	
Harmony	1	Clearfield County	16692	
Harmony	1	Jefferson County	15767	
Harmony Grove	1	York County	17315	
Harmony Hill	1	Chester County	19335	
Harmony Junction	1	Butler County		
Harmony Township	1	Beaver County		
Harmony Township	1	Forest County		
Harmony Township	1	Susquehanna County		
Harmonyville	1	Chester County	19464	
Harnedsville	1	Somerset County	15424	
Harper Tavern	1	Lebanon County	17003	
Harper Village	1	Allegheny County	15001	
Harpers	1	Northampton County	18088	
Harriman	1	Bucks County	19007	
Harris Acres	1	Centre County	16801	
Harris Township	1	Centre County		
Harrisburg	1	Dauphin County	17101	99
Harrisburg East End	1	Dauphin County		
Harrisburg International Airport	1	Dauphin County	17057	
Harrison	1	Somerset County		
Harrison City	1	Westmoreland County	15636	
Harrison Township	1	Allegheny County		
Harrison Township	1	Bedford County		
Harrison Township	1	Potter County		
Harrison Township	1	Allegheny County		
Harrison Valley	1	Potter County	16927	
Harrisonville	1	Fulton County	17228	
Harristown	1	Lancaster County	17562	
Harrisville	1	Butler County	16038	
Harrisville RR name for Forestville	1	Butler County		
Harrity	1	Carbon County	18235	
Harrow	1	Bucks County	18953	
Harshaville	1	Beaver County	15026	
Hartfield	1	Tioga County		
Hartleton	1	Union County	17829	
Hartley	1	Bedford County	15522	
Hartley Township	1	Union County		
Hartranft	1	Montgomery County	19401	
Hartsfield	1	Tioga County	16930	
Hartstown	1	Crawford County	16131	
Hartsville	1	Bucks County	18974	
Harvey Junction	1	Luzerne County	18704	
Harveys Lake	1	Luzerne County	18618	
Harveys Run	1	Jefferson County		
Harveyville	1	Chester County		
Harveyville	1	Luzerne County	18655	
Harwick	1	Allegheny County	15049	
Harwood	1	Luzerne County	18202	
Harwood Park	1	Delaware County	19082	
Haskill	1	Clarion County		
Hasson Heights	1	Venango County	16301	
Hastings	1	Cambria County	16646	
Hastings	1	Forest County		
Hatboro	1	Montgomery County	19040	
Hatboro West	1	Montgomery County	19044	
Hatchtown	1	Crawford County		
Hatfield	1	Fayette County	15401	
Hatfield	1	Montgomery County	19440	
Hatfield Township	1	Montgomery County		
Hatton	1	Cumberland County		
Haucks	1	Schuylkill County		
Hauto	1	Carbon County	18240	
Haverford	2	Delaware County	19041	
Haverford	2	Montgomery County	19041	
Haverford Township	1	Delaware County		
Havertown	1	Delaware County	19083	
Hawk Run	1	Clearfield County	16840	
Hawkeye	1	Westmoreland County	15612	
Hawksville	1	Lancaster County	17566	
Hawley	1	Wayne County	18428	
Hawstone	1	Mifflin County	17044	
Hawthorn	1	Clarion County	16230	
Haycock Run	1	Bucks County	18944	
Haycock Township	1	Bucks County		
Haydentown	1	Fayette County	15478	
Hayesville	1	Chester County	19363	
Hayfield Township	1	Crawford County		
Haymaker	1	McKean County		
Haynie	1	Clarion County	16254	
Hays	1	Allegheny County		
Hays	1	Fayette County	15401	
Hays Army Ammunition Plant	1	Allegheny County	15207	
Hays Creek	1	Carbon County		
Hays Grove	1	Cumberland County	17241	
Hays Mills	1	Somerset County	15552	
Haysville	1	Allegheny County	15143	
Haysville	1	Butler County	16041	
Hayti	1	Chester County	19320	
Hazard	1	Carbon County		
Hazel Hurst	1	McKean County	16733	
Hazel Kirk	1	Washington County	15063	
Hazelton Mills	1	McKean County		
Hazelwood	1	Allegheny County	15207	
Hazen	1	Beaver County		
Hazen	1	Jefferson County	15825	
Hazle Township	1	Luzerne County		
Hazleton	1	Luzerne County	18201	
Hazleton Junction	1	Schuylkill County		
Hazzard	1	Washington County	15063	
Headlee Heights	1	Greene County	15334	
Heart Lake	1	Susquehanna County	18801	
Hearts Content	1	Warren County		
Heath	1	Mercer County		
Heath Township	1	Jefferson County		
Heatherwold	1	Delaware County	19086	
Heathville	1	Jefferson County	15864	
Heaton	1	Montgomery County		
Hebe	1	Northumberland County	17830	
Heberlig	1	Cumberland County	17241	
Hebron	1	Lebanon County	17042	
Hebron	1	Potter County	16915	
Hebron Township	1	Potter County		
Heckscherville	1	Schuylkill County	17901	
Heckton	1	Dauphin County	17110	
Hecktown	1	Northampton County	18017	
Hecla	1	Schuylkill County	17960	
Hecla	1	Westmoreland County		
Hector Township	1	Potter County		
Heebnerville	1	Montgomery County		
Hegarty Crossroads	1	Clearfield County		
Hegins	1	Schuylkill County	17938	
Hegins Township	1	Schuylkill County		
Heidelberg	1	Allegheny County	15106	
Heidelberg Township	1	Berks County		
Heidelberg Township	1	Lebanon County		
Heidelberg Township	1	Lehigh County		
Heidelberg Township	1	York County		
Heidlersburg	1	Adams County	17325	
Heidrick	1	Clarion County		
Heilman	1	Armstrong County		
Heilmandale	1	Lebanon County	17042	
Heilwood	1	Indiana County	15745	
Heise Run	1	Tioga County		
Heistersburg	1	Fayette County	15433	
Helen	1	Fayette County		
Helen Furnace	1	Clarion County	16214	
Helen Mills	1	Elk County		
Helfenstein	1	Schuylkill County	17939	
Helixville	1	Bedford County	15559	
Hellam Township	1	York County		
Hellen Mills	1	Elk County	17925	
Hellertown	1	Northampton County	18055	
Helvetia	1	Clearfield County	15848	
Hemlock	1	Warren County	16365	
Hemlock Farms	1	Pike County		
Hemlock Grove	1	Pike County		
Hemlock Grove	1	Sullivan County	17758	
Hemlock Township	1	Columbia County		
Hempfield	1	Lancaster County		
Hempfield Township	1	Mercer County		
Hempfield Township	1	Westmoreland County		
Henderson	1	Clarion County		
Henderson	1	Clearfield County		
Henderson	1	Mercer County	16153	
Henderson Park	1	Montgomery County	19406	
Henderson Station	1	Venango County		
Henderson Township	1	Huntingdon County		
Henderson Township	1	Jefferson County		
Hendersonville	1	Butler County		
Hendersonville	1	Mercer County		
Hendersonville	1	Washington County	15339	
Hendleton	1	Berks County	19607	
Hendricks	1	Montgomery County	18979	
Henlein	1	Mercer County		
Henley	1	Armstrong County		
Henningsville	1	Berks County	18011	
Henrietta	1	Blair County	16662	
Henry Clay Township	1	Fayette County		
Henrys Bend	1	Venango County	16301	
Henrys Mill	1	Warren County	16313	
Henryville	1	Monroe County	18332	
Hensel	1	Lancaster County	17566	
Hensingerville	1	Lehigh County	18011	
Hepburn Heights	1	Lycoming County	17728	
Hepburn Township	1	Lycoming County		
Hepburnia	1	Clearfield County	16838	
Hepburnville	1	Lycoming County	17728	
Hephzibah	1	Chester County	19320	
Hepler	1	Schuylkill County	17941	
Herbert	1	Fayette County	15435	
Hercules	1	Northampton County	18083	
Hereford	1	Berks County	18056	
Hereford Township	1	Berks County		
Heritage Hills	1	Allegheny County	15037	
Herman	1	Butler County	16039	
Hermine Number 2	1	Westmoreland County	15642	
Herminie	1	Westmoreland County	15637	
Hermit Springs	1	Warren County		
Hermitage	1	Mercer County	16148	
Herndon	1	Northumberland County	17830	
Hero	1	Greene County		
Herrick Center	1	Susquehanna County	18430	
Herrick Township	1	Bradford County		
Herrick Township	1	Susquehanna County		
Herrickville	1	Bradford County	18853	
Herrs Island	1	Allegheny County		
Herrville	1	Lancaster County	17584	
Hershey	1	Dauphin County	17033	
Hershey Heights	1	Adams County	17331	
Hershey Mill	1	Chester County		
Heshbon	1	Indiana County	15717	
Heshbon Park	1	Lycoming County	17701	
Hess Island	1	Luzerne County		
Hessdale	1	Lancaster County	17579	
Hesston	1	Huntingdon County	16647	
Hetlerville	1	Columbia County	18635	
Hettesheimer Corners	1	Wyoming County	18636	
Heverly	1	Clearfield County		
Hewitt	1	Bedford County		
Hiawatha	1	Wayne County	18462	
Hibbs	1	Fayette County	15443	
Hickernell	1	Crawford County	16435	
Hickman	1	Allegheny County	15071	
Hickory	1	Washington County	15340	
Hickory Corners	1	Mercer County	16146	
Hickory Corners	1	Northumberland County	17017	
Hickory Grove	1	Susquehanna County	18847	
Hickory Heights	1	Lawrence County	16101	
Hickory Hill	1	Bedford County		
Hickory Hill	1	Chester County	19363	
Hickory Hills	1	Bucks County	19067	
Hickory Hills	1	Luzerne County		
Hickory Ridge	1	Northumberland County		
Hickory Township	1	Forest County		
Hickory Township	1	Lawrence County		
Hickorytown	1	Cumberland County	17013	
Hickorytown	1	Montgomery County	19401	
Hickox	1	Potter County	16923	
Hicks Ferry	1	Luzerne County	18603	
Hicks Hill	1	Armstrong County	15618	
Hicks Run	1	Cameron County		
Hicksville	1	Armstrong County		
Hickton	1	Washington County		
Hidden Valley	1	Montgomery County	19406	
Hiestand	1	Chester County		
Higbee	1	Greene County		
Higgins Corners	1	Butler County	16040	
High Lake	1	Wayne County	18439	
High Meadows	1	Delaware County	19063	
High Park	1	Montgomery County	19040	
High Rock	1	York County		
Highcliff	1	Allegheny County	15229	
Highfield	1	Butler County	16045	
Highland	1	Allegheny County	15237	
Highland	1	Beaver County	16115	
Highland	1	Berks County		
Highland	1	Bradford County		
Highland	1	Luzerne County	18224	
Highland	1	Philadelphia County		
Highland	1	Westmoreland County	15633	
Highland Acres	1	Delaware County		
Highland Acres	1	Lancaster County	17602	
Highland Avenue	1	Delaware County		
Highland Corners	1	Elk County	16735	
Highland Farms	1	Bucks County	18954	
Highland Fling	1	Cambria County		
Highland Heights	1	Delaware County		
Highland Meadows	1	Allegheny County	15037	
Highland Park	1	Bucks County		
Highland Park	1	Cambria County	15904	
Highland Park	1	Cumberland County	17011	
Highland Park	1	Delaware County	19082	
Highland Park	1	Erie County	16509	
Highland Park	1	Mifflin County	17044	
Highland Park	1	Northampton County	18042	
Highland Township	1	Adams County		
Highland Township	1	Chester County		
Highland Township	1	Clarion County		
Highland Township	1	Elk County		
Highland View	1	Bucks County	18954	
Highmount	1	York County	17406	
Highrock	1	York County	17302	
Highspire	1	Dauphin County	17034	
Highton	1	Bucks County		
Highville	1	Lancaster County	17516	
Hilborn	1	Lycoming County		
Hildebrand	1	York County		
Hileman Heights	1	Blair County		
Hill Church	1	Berks County	19512	
Hill Church	1	Washington County	15317	
Hill City	1	Venango County	16319	
Hill Crest	1	Fayette County	15425	
Hill Crest	1	Montgomery County	19126	
Hill Top Acres	1	Armstrong County	16226	
Hillcoke	1	Fayette County		
Hillcrest	1	Allegheny County	15102	
Hillcrest	1	Beaver County	15001	
Hillcrest	1	Mercer County	16146	
Hillcrest	1	York County	17403	
Hillcroft	1	York County	17403	
Hilldale	1	Allegheny County		
Hilldale	1	Butler County		
Hilldale	1	Luzerne County	18702	
Hillegass	1	Montgomery County		
Hiller	1	Fayette County	15444	
Hilliards	1	Butler County	16040	
Hillman	1	Indiana County	15767	
Hills	1	Washington County		
Hills Terrace	1	Schuylkill County	17948	
Hillsboro	1	Somerset County	15963	
Hillsdale	1	Indiana County	15746	
Hillsdale	1	Susquehanna County		
Hillsgrove	1	Sullivan County	18619	
Hillsgrove Township	1	Sullivan County		
Hillside	1	Lehigh County	18069	
Hillside	1	Luzerne County	18708	
Hillside	1	Schuylkill County	17901	
Hillside	1	Westmoreland County	15627	
Hillside Junction	1	Lackawanna County	18507	
Hillside Village	1	Bucks County	18901	
Hillsview	1	Westmoreland County	15658	
Hillsville	1	Lawrence County	16132	
Hilltop	1	Bucks County		
Hilltop Acres	1	Lancaster County	17603	
Hilltown	1	Adams County	17307	
Hilltown	1	Bucks County	18927	
Hilltown	1	Wayne County		
Hilltown Township	1	Bucks County		
Hillville	1	Armstrong County	16041	
Hilton	1	York County	17315	
Hinkletown	1	Bucks County	18947	
Hinkletown	1	Lancaster County	17522	
Hinkson Corner	1	Delaware County	19086	
Hinterleiter	1	Berks County		
Hites	1	Westmoreland County		
Hiyasota	1	Somerset County	15935	
Hoadleys	1	Wayne County		
Hoagland	1	Mercer County		
Hoagland Vista	1	Sullivan County		
Hoban Heights	1	Wyoming County		
Hobart	1	York County	17331	
Hobbie	1	Luzerne County	18660	
Hoblet	1	Bradford County		
Hoblitzell	1	Bedford County	15545	
Hockersville	1	Cumberland County	17241	
Hockersville	1	Dauphin County	17033	
Hoernerstown	1	Dauphin County	17036	
Hoffer	1	Snyder County	17864	
Hoffman	1	Lehigh County	18080	
Hoffmansville	1	Montgomery County	19435	
Hogestown	1	Cumberland County	17055	
Hogsett	1	Fayette County		
Hoguetown	1	Cambria County	16630	
Hokendauqua	1	Lehigh County	18052	
Hokes	1	York County		
Holbrook	1	Greene County	15341	
Holden	1	Clarion County		
Holicong	1	Bucks County	18928	
Holiday	1	Tioga County		
Holiday Park	1	Allegheny County	15239	
Holland	1	Bucks County	18966	
Holland Heights	1	Lancaster County		
Hollars Hill	1	Luzerne County		
Hollenback	1	Bradford County		
Hollenback Township	1	Luzerne County		
Hollentown	1	Cambria County	16639	
Hollers Hill	1	Luzerne County	18201	
Holley Heights	1	York County	17404	
Hollidaysburg	1	Blair County	16648	
Hollinger	1	Lancaster County	17603	
Hollisters	1	Lackawanna County		
Hollisterville	1	Wayne County	18444	
Hollo	1	Northampton County		
Hollsopple	1	Somerset County	15935	
Holly Hill	1	Bucks County		
Hollywood	1	Clearfield County	15868	
Hollywood	1	Luzerne County	18201	
Hollywood	1	Montgomery County	19046	
Hollywood Heights	1	York County	17403	
Holmes	1	Delaware County	19043	
Holmesburg	1	Philadelphia County	19136	
Hollsopple	1	Somerset County		
Holt	1	Beaver County		
Holters Crossing	1	Centre County	16841	
Holtwood	1	Lancaster County	17532	
Holtz	1	York County		
Homans Corner	1	Bedford County		
Home	1	Indiana County	15747	
Home Acres	1	York County	17403	
Home Park	1	Lehigh County	18052	
Homeacre	1	Butler County	16001	16002
Homeacre-Lyndora	1	Butler County		
Homecamp	1	Clearfield County	15856	
Homeland	1	Lancaster County	17601	
Homer City	1	Indiana County	15748	
Homer Gap	1	Blair County	16601	
Homer Township	1	Potter County		
Homestead	1	Allegheny County	15120	
Homesville	1	Schuylkill County	17921	
Hometown	1	Schuylkill County	18252	
Homets Ferry	1	Bradford County	18853	
Homeville	1	Allegheny County	15122	
Homeville	1	Chester County	16314	
Homewood	1	Allegheny County	15208	
Homewood	1	Beaver County	15010	
Homewood	1	York County	17019	
Homewood Junction	1	Beaver County		
Honeoye	1	Potter County	16748	
Honesdale	1	Wayne County	18431	
Honey Brook	1	Chester County	19344	
Honey Brook Township	1	Chester County		
Honey Creek	1	Mifflin County		
Honey Grove	1	Juniata County	17035	
Honey Hole	1	Luzerne County		
Honey Pot	1	Luzerne County	18634	
Honeytown	1	Columbia County		
Hood	1	Bucks County		
Hoodville	1	Venango County	16373	
Hooker	1	Butler County	16041	
Hooks	1	Armstrong County		
Hookstown	1	Beaver County	15050	
Hoosicks Mill	1	Armstrong County		
Hoover	1	Fayette County	15458	
Hooverhurst	1	Indiana County	15742	
Hoovers	1	Warren County	16347	
Hooversville	1	Somerset County	15936	
Hooverville	1	Westmoreland County	15954	
Hop Bottom	1	Susquehanna County	18824	
Hope Mills	1	Mercer County		
Hopeland	1	Lancaster County	17533	
Hopeville	1	Northampton County		
Hopewell	1	Bedford County	16650	
Hopewell	1	Chester County	19363	
Hopewell	1	Delaware County		
Hopewell	1	Westmoreland County		
Hopewell Center	1	York County		
Hopewell Township	1	Beaver County		
Hopewell Township	1	Bedford County		
Hopewell Township	1	Cumberland County		
Hopewell Township	1	Huntingdon County		
Hopewell Township	1	Washington County		
Hopewell Township	1	York County		
Hopewell Village National Historic Site	2		19520	
Hoppenville	1	Montgomery County	18073	
Hoppers Mill	1	Schuylkill County		
Hoppestown	1	Lycoming County		
Hopwood	1	Fayette County	15445	
Horatio	1	Jefferson County		
Hormtown	1	Jefferson County	15851	
Horn Brook	1	Bradford County	18848	
Horn Siding	1	Warren County		
Hornby	1	Erie County	16428	
Horners Mill	1	Fayette County		
Hornerstown	1	Cambria County		
Hornig	1	Lancaster County		
Horning	1	Allegheny County	15227	
Horningford	1	Mifflin County	17044	
Horntown	1	Delaware County		
Horrell	1	Blair County	16648	
Horseshoe Heights	1	Lancaster County	17602	
Horsham	1	Montgomery County	19044	
Horsham Township	1	Montgomery County		
Horton City	1	Elk County		
Horton Township	1	Elk County		
Hortons	1	Indiana County		
Hortons Corners	1	Bradford County	18853	
Hosensack	1	Lehigh County	18092	
Hosensock	1	Schuylkill County	18214	
Host	1	Berks County	19567	
Hostetter	1	Westmoreland County	15638	
Hottelville	1	Forest County	16239	
Houserville	1	Centre County	16801	
Houseville	1	Butler County		
Houston	1	Washington County	15342	
Houston City	1	Luzerne County	18641	
Houston Junction	1	Mercer County		
Housum	1	Franklin County	17201	
Houtzdale	1	Clearfield County	16651	
Hovey Township	1	Armstrong County		
Howard	1	Allegheny County	15120	
Howard	1	Cameron County	15834	
Howard	1	Centre County	16841	
Howard	1	McKean County		
Howard Junction	1	McKean County		
Howard Siding	1	Cameron County		
Howard Township	1	Centre County		
Howe	1	Jefferson County		
Howe Township	1	Forest County		
Howe Township	1	Perry County		
Howell	1	Cumberland County		
Howellville	1	Chester County	19312	
Howersville	1	Northampton County	18088	
Howertown	1	Northampton County	18067	
Hoytdale	1	Beaver County	16157	
Hoytville	1	Tioga County	16938	
Hublersburg	1	Centre County	16823	
Hubley Township	1	Schuylkill County		
Huckenberry	1	Clearfield County	16849	
Hudson	1	Clearfield County	16866	
Hudson	1	Luzerne County	18702	
Hudsondale	1	Carbon County	18255	
Huefner	1	Clarion County	16235	
Huey	1	Clarion County	16248	
Huff	1	Indiana County	15944	
Huffs Church	1	Berks County	18011	
Hughes Park	1	Montgomery County	19406	
Hughestown	1	Luzerne County	18640	
Hughesville	1	Lycoming County	17737	
Hughs	1	Luzerne County	18621	
Hull	1	Potter County		
Hulltown	1	Fayette County	15428	
Hulmeville	1	Bucks County	19047	
Hulmeville Park	1	Bucks County	19047	
Hulton	1	Allegheny County	15139	
Humbert	1	Somerset County		
Humboldt	1	Luzerne County	18201	
Hummels Store	1	Berks County	19540	
Hummels Wharf	1	Snyder County	17831	
Hummelstown	1	Dauphin County	17036	
Humphreys	1	Westmoreland County	15601	
Humphreyville	1	Chester County	19320	
Hundred Spring	1	Huntingdon County	16686	
Hungerford	1	York County		
Hungry Hollow	1	Armstrong County	15656	
Hunker	1	Westmoreland County	15639	
Hunlock Creek	1	Luzerne County	18621	
Hunlock Gardens	1	Luzerne County	18621	
Hunlock Township	1	Luzerne County		
Hunsecker	1	Lancaster County		
Hunter	1	Forest County		
Hunter	1	Northumberland County	17872	
Hunter Hill	1	Montgomery County	19462	
Hunters Run	1	Cumberland County	17324	
Hunterstown	1	Adams County	17325	
Huntersville	1	Lycoming County	17756	
Hunting Park	1	Philadelphia County	19140	
Huntingdon	1	Huntingdon County	16652	
Huntingdon Furnace	1	Huntingdon County	16686	
Huntingdon Heights	1	Westmoreland County	15642	
Huntingdon Manor	1	Lancaster County	17540	
Huntingdon Meadows	1	Montgomery County	19006	
Huntingdon Valley	1	Montgomery County	19006	
Huntington Mills	1	Luzerne County	18622	
Huntington Township	1	Adams County		
Huntington Township	1	Luzerne County		
Huntley	1	Cameron County	15832	
Huntley	1	Clearfield County		
Huntsdale	1	Cumberland County	17013	
Huntsville	1	Luzerne County	18612	
Huron	1	Fayette County		
Husband	1	Somerset County	15501	
Huskin	1	Somerset County	15924	
Huston Township	1	Blair County		
Huston	1	Somerset County		
Huston Run	1	Washington County		
Huston Township	1	Centre County		
Huston Township	1	Clearfield County		
Hustons Mill	1	Cumberland County	17055	
Hustontown	1	Fulton County	17229	
Hutchins	1	McKean County	16740	
Hutchinson	1	Fayette County	15401	
Hutchinson	1	Westmoreland County	15640	
Hyde	1	Clearfield County	16843	
Hyde Park	1	Berks County	19605	
Hyde Park	1	Lackawanna County		
Hyde Park	1	Westmoreland County	15641	
Hydes	1	Elk County	15823	
Hyde Station	1	Elk County		
Hyde Villa	1	Berks County	19605	
Hydetown	1	Crawford County	16328	
Hyland	1	Washington County		
Hyndman	1	Bedford County	15545	
Hynemansville	1	Lehigh County	18066	
Hyner	1	Clinton County	17738	
Hyner View	1	Clinton County		
Hyson Hill	1	York County		
Iams	1	Greene County		
Icedale	1	Chester County	19344	
Ickesburg	1	Perry County	17037	
Idaho	1	Armstrong County	15774	
Idamar	1	Indiana County	15734	
Idaville	1	Adams County	17337	
Ideal	1	Indiana County		
Idetown	1	Luzerne County	18618	
Idlewood	1	Allegheny County	15205	
Idlewood	1	Bucks County		
Imler	1	Bedford County	16655	
Imlertown	1	Bedford County	15522	
Immaculata	1	Chester County	19345	
Imperial	1	Allegheny County	15126	
Imperial-Enlow	1	Allegheny County		
Independence	1	Snyder County	17864	
Independence	1	Washington County	15343	
Independence National Historical Park	1	Philadelphia County	19106	
Independence Township	1	Beaver County		
Independence Township	1	Washington County		
India	1	Westmoreland County		
Indian Creek	1	Bucks County		
Indian Creek	1	Fayette County		
Indian Crossing	1	McKean County	16731	
Indian Head	1	Erie County	16441	
Indian Head	1	Fayette County	15446	
Indian Hills	1	Carbon County		
Indian King	1	Chester County	19380	
Indian Lake	1	Somerset County	15926	
Indian Mountain Lake	1	Carbon County	18333	
Indian Orchard	1	Wayne County		
Indian Pines	1	Allegheny County	15205	
Indian Point	1	Pike County		
Indian Run	1	Mercer County	16142	
Indian Springs Estates	1	Indiana County		
Indian Village	1	Adams County	17331	
Indiana	1	Indiana County	15701	
Indiana Junction	1	Jefferson County		
Indiana Township	1	Allegheny County		
Indianland	1	Northampton County	18088	
Indianola	1	Allegheny County	15051	
Indiantown	1	Lebanon County		
Indiantown	1	Somerset County		
Indiantown Gap	1	Lebanon County		
Industry	1	Allegheny County		
Industry	1	Beaver County	15052	
Inez	1	Potter County	16915	
Ingleby	1	Centre County	16882	
Inglenook	1	Dauphin County	17032	
Ingleside	1	Cambria County	15904	
Inglesmith	1	Bedford County	17211	
Ingomar	1	Allegheny County	15127	
Ingram	1	Allegheny County	15205	
Inkerman	1	Luzerne County	18640	
Instanter	1	Elk County		
Intercourse	1	Lancaster County	17534	
Inwood	1	Lebanon County		
Iola	1	Columbia County	17846	
Iona	1	Lebanon County	17042	
Ira	1	Clearfield County		
Irish Meeting House	1	Bucks County		
Irishtown	1	Adams County	17350	
Irishtown	1	Clearfield County	16838	
Irishtown	1	Fayette County		
Irishtown	1	Lancaster County		
Irishtown	1	McKean County	16738	
Irishtown	1	Mercer County	16137	
Iron Bridge	1	Armstrong County		
Iron Bridge	2	Fayette County	15666	
Iron City	1	Forest County		
Iron Ridge	1	York County		
Iron Springs	1	Adams County	17320	
Ironbridge	1	Montgomery County		
Ironsides	1	Chester County	19442	
Ironstone	1	Berks County		
Ironton	1	Lehigh County	18037	
Ironville	1	Blair County	16686	
Ironville	1	Lancaster County	17512	
Irvin	1	Allegheny County	15122	
Irvine	1	Warren County	16329	
Irving	1	Schuylkill County	17963	
Irvington	1	Delaware County		
Irvona	1	Clearfield County	16656	
Irwin	1	Westmoreland County	15642	
Irwin Township	1	Venango County		
Isabella	1	Chester County		
Isabella	1	Fayette County	15447	
Iselin	1	Indiana County	15681	
Iselin Heights	1	Clearfield County	15801	
Island Park	1	Cambria County		
Island Park	1	Northumberland County	17801	
Island Plain	1	Susquehanna County		
Ithan	1	Delaware County	19085	
Itley	1	Erie County	16412	
Iva	1	Lancaster County	17562	
Ivarea	1	Erie County	16410	
Ivy Hill	1	Philadelphia County		
Ivy Mills	1	Delaware County	19017	
Ivy Rock	1	Montgomery County		
Ivyland	1	Bucks County	18974	
Ivywood	1	Butler County		
