= Industry =

Industry may refer to:

== Economics ==
- Industry (economics), a specific branch of economic activity
- Industry (manufacturing), any general category of related production activities, typically in factories with machinery
- The wider industrial sector of an economy, including manufacturing and production of other intermediate or final goods
- The general characteristics and production methods common to an industrial society
  - Industrialization, the transformation into an industrial society
- Industry classification, a classification of economic organizations and activities

== Places ==
- Industry, Alabama
- Industry, California
  - Industry station
- Industry, Illinois
- Industry, Kansas
- Industry, Maine
- Industry, Missouri
- Industry, New York
  - Industry, Pennsylvania, in Beaver County
  - Industry, Allegheny County, Pennsylvania
- Industry, Texas
- Industry Bar, a New York City gay bar
- Industry-Rock Falls Township, Phelps County, Nebraska

== Film and television ==
- Made in Canada (TV series), a Canadian situation comedy also known as The Industry, 1998–2003
- Industry (TV series), a British drama on BBC Two and HBO that debuted in 2020

== Music ==
- Industry, a song by King Crimson from Three of a Perfect Pair, 1984
- Industry (American band), a 1980s synth-pop band
- Industry (Irish band), 2009–2010
- Industry (Dom & Roland album), 1998
- Industry (Richard Thompson and Danny Thompson album), 1997
- Industry (EP), by Jon McLaughlin, 2007

== Other uses ==
- Industry (archaeology), a typological classification of stone tools
- "Industries", the seventh expansion park for the city building game Cities: Skylines

== See also ==
- Industrial (disambiguation)
- Industria (disambiguation)
