= Industrial =

Industrial may refer to:

== Industry ==
- Industrial archaeology, the study of the history of the industry
- Industrial engineering, engineering dealing with the optimization of complex industrial processes or systems
- Industrial city, a city dominated by one or more industries
- Industrial loan company, a type of financial institution in the US
- Industrial organization, a field that builds on the theory of the firm by examining the structure and boundaries between firms and markets
- Industrial Revolution, the development of industry in the 18th and 19th centuries
  - Second Industrial Revolution
- Industrial society, a society that has undergone industrialization
- Industrial technology, a broad field that includes designing, building, optimizing, managing and operating industrial equipment, and predesignated as acceptable for industrial uses, like factories
- Industrial video, a video that targets "industry" as its primary audience
- Industrialization, the societal process and period of developing such technology and transforming into such societies
- Warehouses or logistics properties, referred to as industrial, or industrial properties

== Arts and entertainment ==
=== Music ===
- Industrial (album), debut album by Pitchshifter
- Industrial music, the genre of music that draws on transgressive and provocative themes
  - Industrial dance, a subgenre characterized by electronic beats, symphonic keyboard lines, pile-driver rhythms, angst-ridden or sampled vocals, and cyberpunk imagery
  - Industrial metal, a fusion genre characterized by repeating metal guitar riffs, sampling, synthesizer or sequencer lines, and distorted vocals
  - Industrial rock, a fusion genre characterized by electric guitars, drums, and bass paired with white noise blasts and electronic music gear, such as synthesizers, sequencers, samplers and drum machines
- Industrial Records, a record label established in 1976 by the industrial music group and performance artists, Throbbing Gristle

=== Other uses in the arts ===
- Industrial architecture, pre-modern style of building design
- Industrial musical, a bespoke musical theatre performance for a company's employees
- Industrial style, 21st-century interior design aesthetic

== Other uses ==
- Industrial, West Virginia, an unincorporated community
- Industrial Township, St. Louis County, Minnesota
- Two functional constituencies in the elections for the Legislative Council of Hong Kong:
  - Industrial (First)
  - Industrial (Second)
- Industrial Area (Doha), Qatar
- Industrial (Mexibús, Line 1), a BRT station in Ecatepec, Mexico
- Industrial (Mexibús, Line 4), a BRT station in Ecatepec, Mexico
- Industrial piercing, any two pierced ear holes connected with a single straight piece of jewelry

== See also ==
- Industry (disambiguation)
- Industrial group (disambiguation)
- Industria (disambiguation)
