= Conemaugh Township Area School District =

School district in Pennsylvania

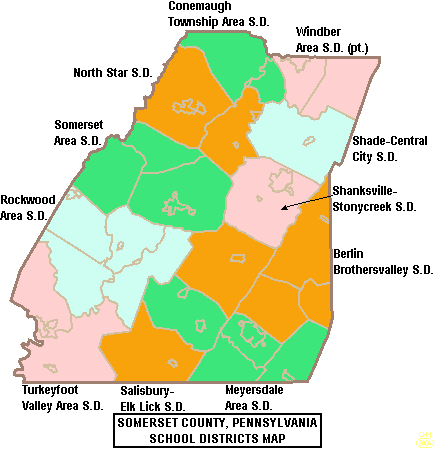

Address
- 300 West Campus Avenue Davidsville, Pennsylvania, 15928; United States

District information
- Type: Public

Students and staff
- District mascot: Indians

Other information
- Website: http://www.ctasd.org/

The Conemaugh Township Area School District covers the Borough of Benson and Conemaugh Township and the western portion of Paint Township in Somerset County, Pennsylvania. The district encompasses approximately 53 square miles. According to 2000 federal census data, it serves a resident population of 7,694.

== Schools ==
The district operates a primary school, an intermediate school and a junior/senior high school

- Conemaugh Township Area Elementary School (Grades K-5)
  1516 Tire Hill Rd.
  Johnstown, Pennsylvania 15905
- Conemaugh Township Area Middle/Senior High School (Grades 6-12)
  300 W. Campus Av.
  Davidsville, Pennsylvania 15928
