= Conemaugh Township Area Middle/Senior High School =

Coordinates: 40.227661°N 78.937733°W

Location
- 300 West Campus Avenue; Conemaugh Township, Somerset County, Pennsylvania; Davidsville, Pennsylvania 15928

Information
- School type: Public Middle/High School
- Motto: Team Township - A great place to grow!
- Opened: 1939
- School district: Conemaugh Township Area School District
- NCES District ID: 4206420
- Superintendent: Nicole Dull
- NCES School ID: 420642003978
- Principal: James Foster
- Teaching staff: 29.71 (on an FTE basis)
- Employees: 6
- Grades: 7–12
- Enrollment: 306 (2023–2024)
- Student to teacher ratio: 10.30
- Colors: Red, white and black
- Team name: Indians
- Newspaper: The Contownian
- Yearbook: The Connumach
- Communities served: Benson, Davidsville
- Feeder schools: Conemaugh Township Elementary School
- Website: Conemaugh Township Area Middle/Senior High School

Conemaugh Township Area Middle/Senior High School is a public Middle and High School, serving students in grades 7–12 in the Conemaugh Township Area School District. The 13-acre campus is located in the township community of Davidsville, Pennsylvania.

== Clubs and activities ==
CT offers the following clubs and activities to students:

- Art Club
- Bible Club
- Computer Club
- Conservation Club
- Contownian / Connumach
- Fellowship of Christian Athletes
- Forensics / Speech Teem
- French Club
- Grill Team
- Instrumental Music
- Junior High Scholastic Quiz Team
- Math Counts
- Musical / Drama Club
- National Honor Society
- Principal's Cabinet
- Science Club
- Senior High Scholastic Quiz Team
- Senior Rotarians
- Serving Our Neighbors Club
- Ski Club
- Spanish Club
- Student Council
- Students Against Destructive Decisions (SADD)
- Vocal Music

== Athletics ==
- Baseball - Class A
- Basketball - Class A/AA
- Football - Class A
- Golf - Class AAAA
- Rifle - Class AAAA
- Soccer - Class A/AA
- Softball - Class AA
- Track and Field - Class AA
- Volleyball - Class A
- Wrestling - Class AA
