= Tommy Kalmanir =

American gridiron football player and coach (1926–2004)

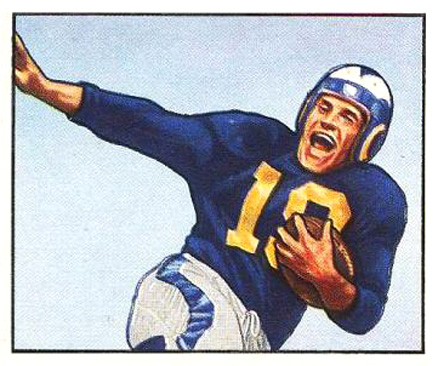

No. 24, 40, 99
- Position: Halfback

Personal information
- Born: March 30, 1926; Jerome, Pennsylvania, U.S.
- Died: October 12, 2004 (aged 78); Fresno, California, U.S.
- Listed height: 5 ft 8 in (1.73 m)
- Listed weight: 171 lb (78 kg)

Career information
- High school: Conemaugh Township (Davidsville, Pennsylvania)
- College: Pittsburgh (1943); Nevada (1946–1948)
- NFL draft: 1947: 25th round, 229th overall pick

Career history

Playing
- Los Angeles Rams (1949–1951); Baltimore Colts (1953); Edmonton Eskimos (1955)

Coaching
- Toronto Argonauts (1957) Backfield coach; Oakland Raiders (1960–1961) Offensive backs coach; Oakland Raiders (1962) Assistant coach

Awards and highlights
- NFL champion (1951)

Career NFL statistics
- Rushing yards: 415
- Rushing average: 5.1
- Receptions: 16
- Receiving yards: 216
- Total touchdowns: 6
- Stats at Pro Football Reference

Thomas J. Kalmanir (/ˈkælmaɪnɜːr/ KAL-my-nur; March 30, 1926 – October 12, 2004) was an American football player.

Born in Jerome, Pennsylvania, Kalmanir grew up in Jamestown, Pennsylvania. He played college football at the University of Nevada as a running back and return specialist. At Nevada Tommy set numerous records and was a member of two bowl teams in 1947 and 1948, often considered two of the greatest teams in Nevada football history. He was selected in the NFL draft in 1949 and played with the Los Angeles Rams and Baltimore Colts. He was a member of the Rams' 1951 NFL Championship Team. While with the Rams he appeared as a guest on the television game show What's My Line? on September 14, 1952 and was the first contestant to have his occupation guessed correctly (by Arlene Francis) during the initial free guess round.

After retiring as a player, he coached in the CFL as well as for the Oakland Raiders, before becoming a businessman in the San Francisco Bay Area. He retired to Fresno, California.
