= Seanor =

Seanor may refer to:

- Seanor, Pennsylvania, a community in Somerset County
- James Seanor, a Union Navy sailor
