= Davidsville, Pennsylvania =

Unincorporated community in Pennsylvania, US

Davidsville is a census-designated place (CDP) in Somerset County, Pennsylvania, United States. The population was 1,119 at the 2000 census. It is part of the Johnstown, Pennsylvania, Metropolitan Statistical Area. Davidsville is part of the municipality of Conemaugh Township, Somerset County, Pennsylvania, as are the nearby towns of Jerome, Thomas Mills, Tire Hill, Seanor, Hyasota, and part of Holsopple. Davidsville is Area code: 814 Exchange: 479; ZIP Code: 15928.

== History ==
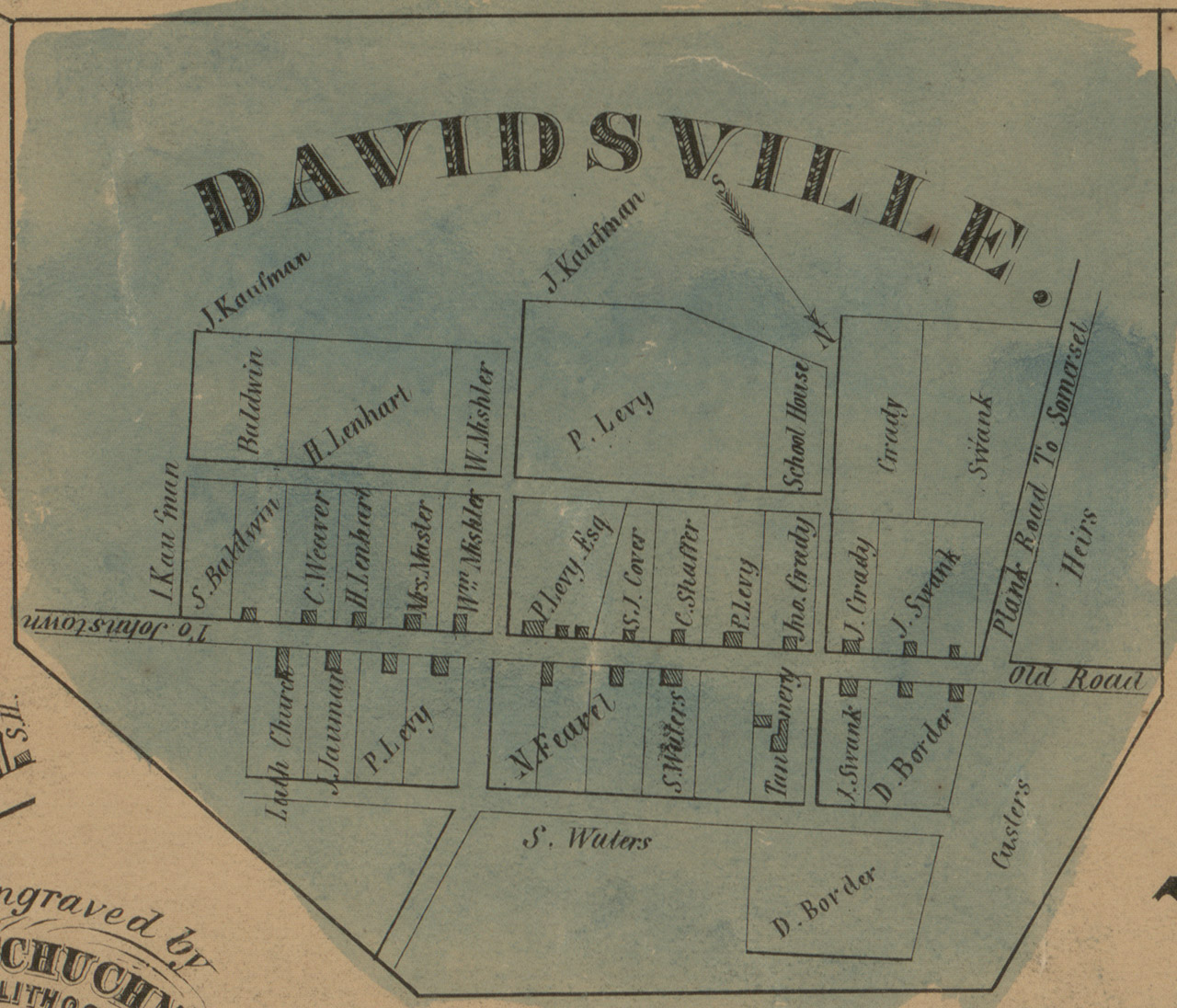
Davidsville, Somerset County, PA, 1860 (note orientation of map: north towards bottom)

David Stutzman laid out Davidsville in 1831, with Thomas Gaghegan serving as surveyor. Joseph Schell & Peter Levy built the first house in 1831, Tobias Mishler & Samuel Livingstone built a blacksmith shop in 1832, and a schoolhouse was built around 1835. A Lutheran church was built in 1852.

== Geography ==
Davidsville is located at 40°13′36″N 78°56′12″W. According to the United States Census Bureau, the CDP has a total area of 2.3 square miles (6.0 km^{2}), all land.

== Demographics ==
At the 2000 census there were 1,119 people, 441 households, and 355 families living in the CDP. The population density was 489.5 inhabitants per square mile (189.0/km^{2}). There were 458 housing units at an average density of 200.3 per square mile (77.3/km^{2}). The racial makeup of the CDP was 98.93% White, 0.09% African American, 0.27% Native American, 0.63% Asian, 0.09% from other races. Hispanic or Latino of any race were 0.71%.

Of the 441 households 29.9% had children under the age of 18 living with them, 70.7% were married couples living together, 7.0% had a female householder with no husband present, and 19.5% were non-families. 17.2% of households were one person and 9.8% were one person aged 65 or older. The average household size was 2.54 and the average family size was 2.85.

The age distribution was 22.1% under the age of 18, 6.3% from 18 to 24, 25.4% from 25 to 44, 26.3% from 45 to 64, and 19.9% 65 or older. The median age was 43 years. For every 100 females, there were 91.6 males. For every 100 females age 18 and over, there were 87.9 males.

The median household income was $35,577 and the median family income was $41,333. Males had a median income of $31,923 versus $21,912 for females. The per capita income for the CDP was $16,512. About 2.0% of families and 4.0% of the population were below the poverty line, including 2.8% of those under age 18 and 3.5% of those age 65 or over.
