= Jerome, Pennsylvania =

Unincorporated community in Pennsylvania, US

Jerome
- Census-designated place
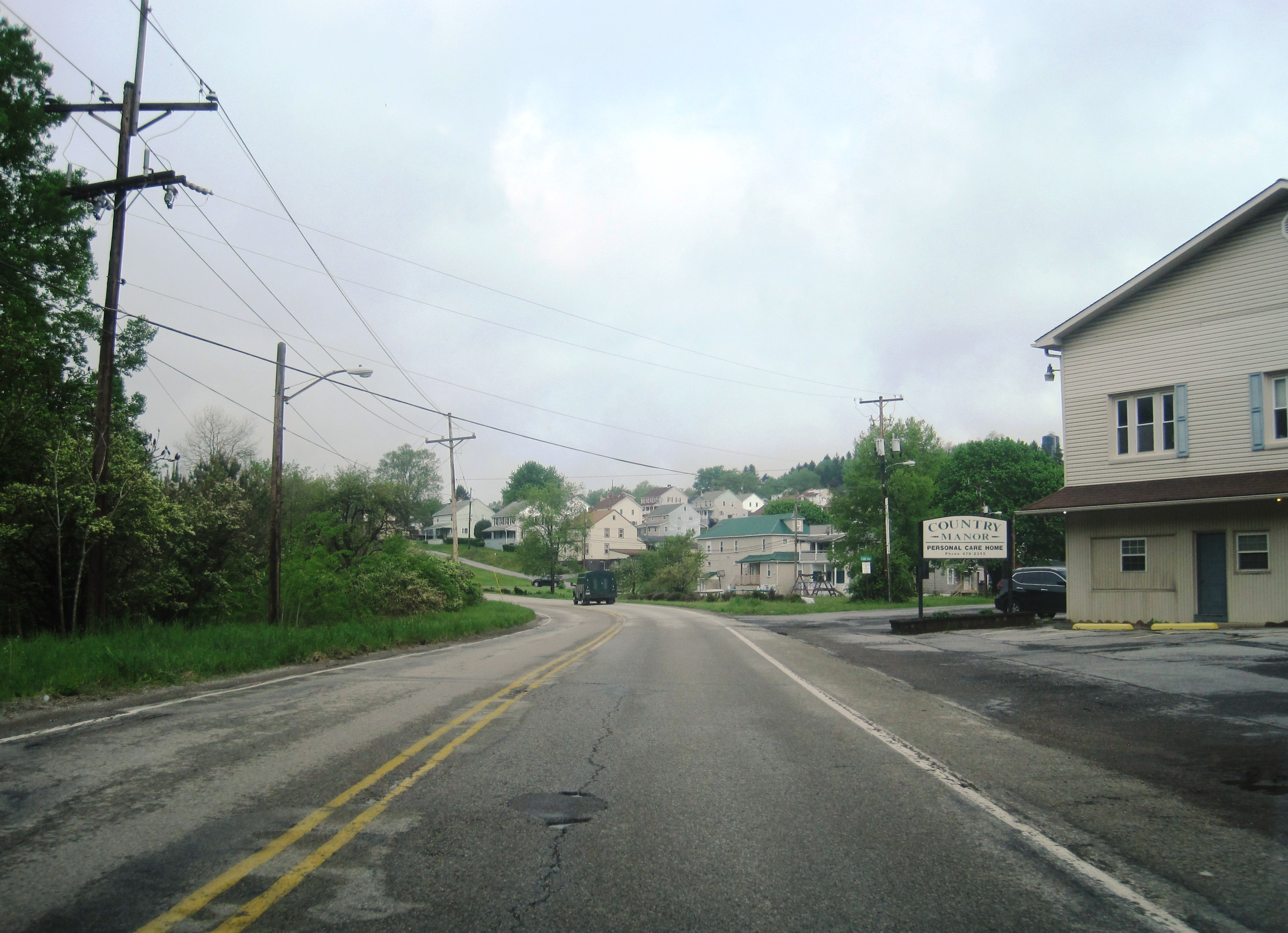
- Southbound PA 601 (Penn Avenue) through Jerome

- Location of Jerome in Pennsylvania Jerome (the United States)
- Coordinates: 40°12′36″N 78°59′8″W
- Country: United States
- State: Pennsylvania
- County: Somerset

Area
  - Total: 2.60 sq mi (6.74 km^{2})
  - Land: 2.60 sq mi (6.74 km^{2})
  - Water: 0 sq mi (0.00 km^{2})

Population (2020)
  - Total: 942
  - Density: 361.9/sq mi (139.74/km^{2})
- Time zone: UTC-5 (Eastern (EST))
  - Summer (DST): UTC-4 (EDT)
- ZIP codes: 15937
- Area code: 814
- FIPS code: 42-38104

Jerome is a census-designated place (CDP) in Somerset County, Pennsylvania. The population was 779 as of 2010. It is part of the Johnstown, Pennsylvania, Metropolitan Statistical Area. Jerome is part of the municipality of Conemaugh Township, Somerset County, Pennsylvania, as are the nearby towns of Davidsville, Thomas Mills, Tire Hill, Seanor, Hiyasota and part of Holsopple.

== Geography ==
Jerome is located at 40°12′36″N 78°59′8″W (40.210047, -78.985652).

According to the U.S. Census Bureau, the CDP has a total area of 2.6 square miles (6.7 km^{2}), all land.

The elevation of Jerome is 1796 feet (547 meters) above sea level.

== Demographics ==
Historical population
Census	Pop.	Note	%±
2020	942		—
U.S. Decennial Census

At the 2010 census, there were 779 people, 317 households, and 215 families residing in the CDP. The population density was 299.6 inhabitants per square mile (115.7/km^{2}). There were 348 housing units at an average density of 133.8 per square mile (51.7/km^{2}). The racial makeup of the CDP was 763 (97.9%) white, White. 2 (0.3%) Asian (Asian, 5 (0.6%) Latino Latino and 4 (0.5%) of other miscellaneous races.

There were 317 households, of which 75 (23.7%) had children under the age of 18 living with them, 156 (49.2%) were married couples living together, 38 (12.0%) had a female householder with no husband present, 21 (6.6%) had a male householder with no wife present, and 102 (32.2%) were non-families. 90 (28.4%) of all households were made up of individuals living alone, and 48 (15.1%) had someone living alone who was 65 years of age or older. The average household size was 2.32 and the average family size was 2.85.

The age distribution was 18.4% (143) under the age of 18, 3.9% (30) from 18 to 24, 21.4% (167) from 25 to 44, 28.5% (222) from 45 to 64, and 25.3% (197) who were 65 years of age or older. The median age was 48.2 years. For every 100 females, there were 87.7 males. For every 100 females aged 18 and over, there were 87.6 males.

2010 income data has not yet been made available for income figures, so these income figures are still based on the 2000 census: The median household income was $26,667, and the median family income was $33,872. Males had a median income of $36,528 versus $16,553 for females. The per capita income for the CDP was $13,033. About 5.3% of families and 6.1% of the population were below the poverty line, including 10.1% of those under age 18 and 7.5% of those aged 65 or over.

== History ==
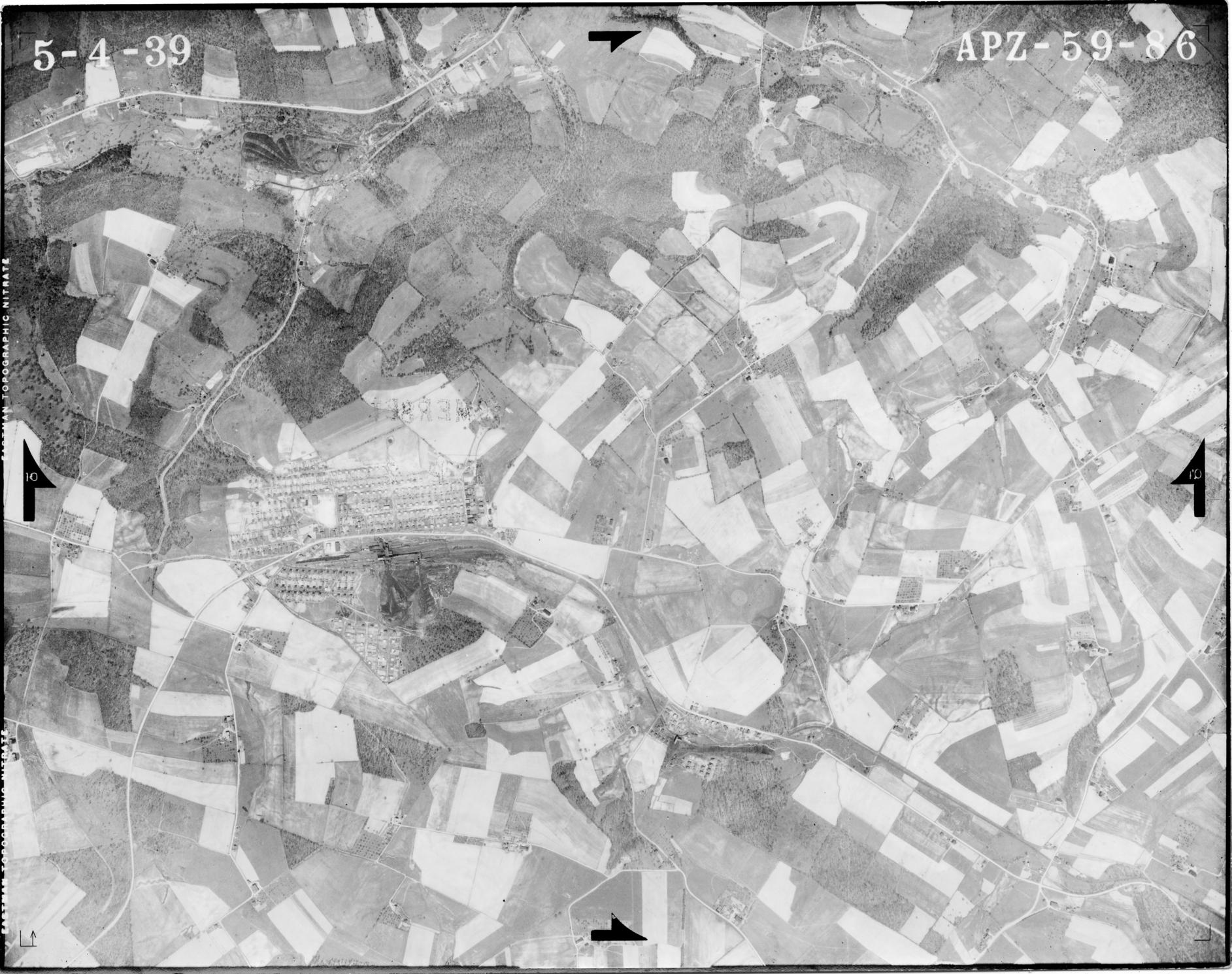
Aerial view of Jerome and vicinity, May 4, 1939. Notice the mining buildings, railroad tracks, and bony piles, which now are removed. Also notice the expanse of farmed fields, now many reforested.

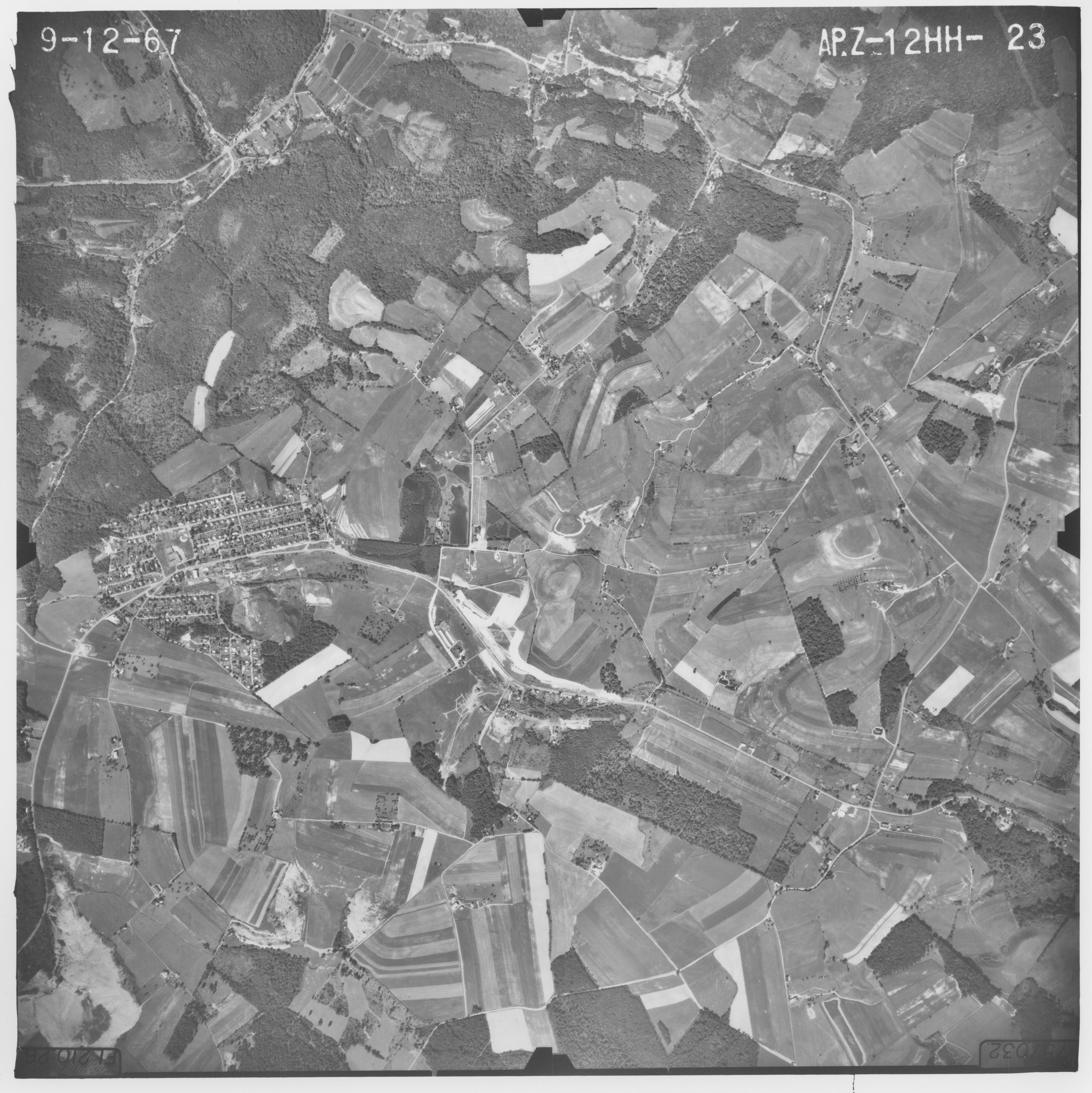
Aerial view of Jerome and vicinity, Sept. 12, 1967. To see a 1993 USGS aerial image of Jerome, click here

Jerome was built in 1904 as a company town for what became the Hillman Coal and Coke Company Company of Pittsburgh, and named for Jerome Coulson, the son of a coal company official. The town filled mostly with immigrants from Croatia, Poland, Hungary, Russia and Italy—particularly Italians from the Alpine province of Trentino and the town of San Lorenzo in Banale (part of the Dolomiti di Brenta area)—in addition to local Scots-Irish, Welsh and German stock. Jerome was the largest single coal mine in the Cambria-Somerset district.

Jerome's wood frame houses were primarily of two designs—two-story semi-detached houses and smaller single-family cottages. Most of these initial dwellings still stand today. These houses, especially in the period before 1970, typically were surrounded by large vegetable gardens, fruit trees, and grape arbors. Homemade wine was a local specialty.

At its economic peak, Jerome boasted a 300-seat movie theatre, a bank, a hotel, an auto dealership, several dry goods and grocery stores, several taverns, an electrical appliance store, a YMCA, and a bowling alley. A local tavern maintained a popular bocce court. The mine employed over 1000 men. Residents from that period claim Jerome's population stood at about 3,000 at its peak, although this information is yet to be documented. However, Jerome's population certainly was sufficient to justify the capital investment to tie the town into the interurban transit system. Electric streetcar service from Jerome to the nearby city of Johnstown was proposed as early as 1908. In 1921, the project was financed through a public bond offering, construction was completed and service began. The streetcar tram left from the Jerome terminus every two hours for the 60-minute trip that ended on downtown Johnstown's Main Street.

Property right-of-way was obtained to extend this tram service to the south to Boswell, Jenners, Somerset, and Rockwood, although track construction never commenced. Service to Johnstown ended in 1933. Separately, a branch line of the Baltimore and Ohio Railroad (B&O) served Jerome and its coal mine, connecting to the B&O trunk line in present-day Benson.

An underground explosion killed two miners instantly and two later from burns received at the Jerome mine on July 29, 1932, The single largest accident in the mine's history uncovered in research to date. The coal mine closed in the 1954. Jerome rapidly became a bedroom community. The town retained much of its close-knit ethnic character and its spirit well into the 1990s, however. As an example, the Jerome Volunteer Fire Department was founded in 1952 with Steve Gironda as its first president. The Volunteer Fire Department remains today as an anchor of community activity. In 1955, the Dorfman and Hoffman Company established a garment factory in the former Hillman company store building, bringing 200 needed jobs to Jerome. The factory continued operation until 1964. A lumber mill operated out of former mining operations buildings in the 1970s. A wind-whipped fire destroyed the lumber mill in 1975, and the remaining mining buildings were demolished subsequently.

National Football League quarterback Jeff Hostetler (career 1985-1997) grew up on a farm just outside Jerome. Hostetler led the New York Giants to their 20-19 win over the Buffalo Bills in Super Bowl XXV (see 1990 New York Giants season). Jerome native Brian Ferrari qualified for the 1992 U.S. Olympic Marathon Trials. Ferrari also holds two NCAA Division II championships in 10,000 meters and one national cross-country championship. In 1998, Jerome natives Dick Trachok and Tommy Kalmanir each were inducted into the University of Nevada, Reno's football Team of Century. Kalminer played in Nevada's backfield, 1946–48, and later played for the Los Angeles Rams and Baltimore Colts. Trachock was a top running back at Nevada and later served as Nevada's head football coach (1959–1968) and athletic director (1970–1986). Jerome's Tony Venzon (1915–1971) was a baseball umpire for the National League 1957-1971, including 1959, 1962 and 1969 All-Star Games and 1963 and 1965 World Series. Jazz clarinetist, band leader and composer Ted Lach (1914–1968) was a native of Jerome.

== The miners' strike of 1922-1923 ==
Jerome was the scene of several unionization efforts by the United Mine Workers Union. An important and the longest of these efforts was the strike that began on Good Friday morning, April 14, 1922, led by local miner George Gregory, with the assistance of outside union supporters.

Rumors of strikes at non-union mines, such as Jerome at that time, had been circulating for several weeks. Indeed, the General Policy Committee of the United Mine Workers Union issued a call on March 24 for the nation's 200,000 non-union miners to join a planned nationwide strike on April 1, to coincide with the expiration of the current union contract. Organizers slid past armed company police to circulate pamphlets and leaflets, as seen here and here, to encourage the miners' walk out.

=== Hillman Coal's viewpoint ===
For its part, Hillman Coal and Coke believed it provided a willful benevolence within Jerome and Boswell, its two coal towns in Somerset County, although miners under Hillman tutelage disagreed, as the strike would show. To be sure, Hillman ran these towns with an iron fist; simply entering Jerome by car required inspection by a gauntlet of armed private police, for instance. But Hillman also built Boswell with a number of extra amenities, such as a high school, central business district, and brick construction for its patch housing. And in Jerome, the Company built a community center including a YMCA, pool hall, bowling alley, butchery, greengrocer, theater, and post office, in addition to the Hillman Supply Company store. In October 1921 Hillman established the First National Bank of Jerome for its workers. It allowed for the construction of a streetcar line from Johnstown in 1921 (as noted above), which made travel easier and more frequent than could be provided by the railroad. Hillman even engaged in a significant capital re-investment at Jerome, rebuilding a brick new community center after the initial structure was destroyed in a spectacular, wind-driven fire on April 2, 1922.

However, demand for coal nationwide dropped precipitously and continually for several years after World War I. In response, Hillman closed its mines at Ella and Patterson, Allegheny County, and at Naomi, Fayette County, but maintained production at Boswell and Jerome. By mid-1921, the Company told its shareholders in its annual report, “…the demand [for coal] became so small and the competition from non-union fields so severe that it was evident that the non-union mines of your Company could not continue to operate unless wages were readjusted. As a result of this condition, wages were reduced…at your Jerome Mines on July 16, 1921.” Hillman continued that the reduction allowed the Jerome mine to operate “on a competitive basis” and “with regularity,” with the result being that “earnings of the men at your non-union mines for the year 1921 are far in excess of those received by men at union mines….”, who, Hillman implied, suffered frequent short-term furloughs as the result of slack demand. Hillman told its shareholders that, prior to the pay cut, “men working by day were being paid $7.50 for eight hours work, and men working by the ton were able to earn $10.00 to $14.00 per day.” (Note that these wages reported by Hillman to its stockholders were flatly contradicted by other reportage, for instance, Blankenhorn maintained that union gross wages in 1922 more typically ranged from $14.60 to $17.50 per week, and after deductions for goods purchased through company stores, a typical miner's weekly net take-home pay often was less than $1.00.) On all its coal operations, including Jerome and Boswell, Hillman Coal and Coke reported an operating profit of approximately $925,000, on revenues of $8.225 million in 1919, and an operating profit of approximately $336,000, on revenues of $4.475 million in 1921.

But Jerome was seething. Hillman Coal & Coke cut miners' wages a second time during the deflation of 1921 and working conditions remained hard and strict, to miners' perception. Additionally, mine owners had recently ceased payment and expected miners to do for no pay "dead work", which was the removal of non-bituminous soils, slate, and rubbish from the mines. Gregory and local miners held several secret pre-strike rallies at the "Sokolniapolskawjerom", the Jerome Polish Falcons Hall, although one wonders how secret they were, given over 600 men attended one meeting. Sensing trouble, Hillman suddenly increased its armed guard patrolling the town at the end of March 1922. Hillman police also were stopping all autos before entering Jerome. Scattered walkouts began at smaller non-union mines—in St. Michael, Cambria County, a partial strike began on April 1 and gained momentum through April 5, and at Mine 36, near Windber, Somerset County, a walk-out on April 6.

=== Powers Hapgood and his work ===
On April 11, John Brophy, president of United Mine Workers Union District 2, asked Powers Hapgood, a 23-year-old Harvard graduate, who had given up his silver spoon to live and work as a miner, if he would volunteer to help organize Somerset County non-union mines. Hapgood began at Jerome and Boswell.

The gentle-looking Hapgood, nephew of the U.S.’s ambassador to Denmark, at first evoked much derision among some Union officials, although apparently not among miners, with whom he worked shoulder-to-shoulder deep in the mines. Four decades later, Brophy wrote of Hapgood, "He was sincere, friendly, and courageous to the point of foolhardiness. By that, I mean that he would sometimes drive ahead in a situation without considering sufficiently what he was up against. As a result, he got some pretty hard knocks at times." In Jerome, Hapgood linked up with Gregory. While more acquainted with the rough-and-tumble than was Hapgood initially, Gregory himself—who went by the nickname "Praying George," because of his frequent and vocal prayers during workers' rallies—was a strict teetotaler, who had been deputized by the local sheriff for a Prohibition squad. In idealism and social vision, Gregory and Hapgood were kindred spirits. The two became lifelong friends.

In addition to direct work as a miner, Hapgood relied on three approaches to organize the Somerset coalfields – civil disobedience, litigation, and publicity. First, in pioneering methods evocative later of Mahatma Gandhi and Martin Luther King Jr., Hapgood depended heavily on peaceful, civil disobedience. Coal towns were the wholly owned private property of corporations at the time, and so, in the eyes of these companies, simply walking the street uninvited was deemed to be trespassing. Hapgood in Somerset County was arrested more than a dozen times on the picket line and at the head of marches, as the strike unfolded. (Hapgood, Gregory, and others also took picketing directly to various corporate headquarters on Wall Street, where they did not invite arrest but achieved considerable positive publicity and access.)

Hapgood’s arrests then gave him a venue to the judicial system, where Hapgood insisted on his – and the miners’ – procedural and Constitutional rights. Indeed, an important part of the Somerset County coal strike played out in the courtroom of Somerset County Judge John Berkey, where mine owners sometimes, but not always, prevailed under Judge Berkey’s often even-handed rulings.

Hapgood, as the strike continued, then made sure that the plight of Somerset County miners remained front-page news across the United States. From the strike's beginning, Hapgood, Brophy, Gregory, and other union leaders understood the powerful role public opinion could play; The men engaged in what, even by today’s best practices, would be seen as a sophisticated public relations program. In New York City, the program sparked sympathetic press coverage, generally effective public affairs, the intervention by the mayor of New York on the miners' side, direct public appeals in the subways, and even the support of mine owners, such as John D. Rockefeller Jr., whose family owned strike-bound Somerset County coal mines in Gray, Jenners, Acosta, Ralphton and Randolph. Gregory and other miners later traveled to Washington to meet with President Warren G. Harding.

=== The strike at Jerome begins ===
On April 14, Jerome miners dressed for work and gathered at the shaft head, but refused to enter the mine. Blankenhorn, in his history of the strike, wrote, "The super began a conciliatory speech of promises of good treatment, 'What's the good of that? We've heard that bull for ten years,' cried Gregory.....'If you don't go to work, I'll shut down this mine till the grass grows over the drift mouth,' [the super responded]...A boy miner, DiGiancomo, shouted back, 'I'll eat that grass before I'll scab." And the strike was on. The men marched through Jerome, with an accordion player in the lead, to a mass rally that was still going strong when union organizers arrived around noontime. The mine owners were thunderstruck; never before had they been hit by a successful universal rebellion against their rule. The Jerome action lit the fuse; the strike spread to non-union mines in Hiyasota, Kelso, Boswell, Jenners, Listie, Acosta, Gray, and elsewhere the next days; within one week a regional non-union coal work stoppage was in full force. The Jerome strike was significant in that it was among the first and the largest non-union site in the region to join in the nationwide strike called by the United Mine Workers Union, thus providing tipping-point momentum for the strike, or as Blankenhorn expressed it in his book's table of contents, "Jerome's Explosion." The 1922 strike became the largest action in United Mine Workers Union history; at its peak, more than 500,000 union and non-union miners, in the bituminous and anthracite fields, had walked off their jobs.

Jerome was turned into an occupied camp by a strike that lasted sixteen months. By mid-May 1922, for instance, 29 Somerset County sheriff's deputies patrolled Jerome, alongside a much larger contingent of company police and a unit of the Pennsylvania State police. The State Militia arrived a few months later. During this period, Hillman Coal systematically began to evict miner families from company-owned housing. According to Hillman records, quoted by Blankenhorn, 192 families in Jerome were set out into the street, about one-third of Hillman's employment at the mine at the time. A 'tent city' was established for homeless strikers and their families on the nearby lands of sympathetic farmers. These evictions here and elsewhere in Somerset County sparked an unusual swell of public sympathy. A commission appointed by the mayor of New York City, which got its coal to run subways from various Somerset County coal mines, found "hundreds of strikers evicted and suffering from the cold", "saw in tents, hen-houses, stables and other improvised homes women and children whose feet were bare and bleeding" and declared that living and working conditions "were worse than the conditions of slaves prior to the Civil War." John D. Rockefeller Jr., whose family owned several Somerset County coal mines, but not Jerome's, wrote, "I believe that the underlying grievances of the miners in this district are well founded, and I have urged with all the sincerity and vigor at my command that the present labor policy of the operators, which seems to me to be both unwise and unjust, be radically altered."

The strike held together, despite its length and brutality; the Company said later that, of the approximately 750 miners on strike at its beginning, only about 100 broke ranks and returned to work early. In the last days of the strike in 1923, a number of buildings, railroad bridges, and other property were destroyed by dynamite in acts of sabotage. A gunpowder or dynamite blast destroyed a shelter for homeless striking families. Dynamite destroyed a 200-foot steel railroad bridge spanning the Stonycreek River near Jerome on July 19, 1923. Somerset County Sheriff J.W.Griffith told writer Blankenhorn that both strikers and company employees held responsibility for explosions. "There are guards who want to keep their jobs going and strikers who have been making threats," Sheriff Griffith said.

=== Results of the strike at Jerome ===
While the strike caused significant hardship, and even decayed into violence frequently from both sides, not all was grim. Blankenhorn, who was a writer for the magazine "The Nation", relayed the adventure of one young student and union organizer from Pittsburgh, named Viscosky, who convinced Hillman to hire him as a guard just prior to the strike. Blackenhorn wrote, Viscosky "used his very special opportunity to line them [the miners] up for a strike. The only man whom he reported to the company was one who refused to have anything to do with the 'union,' the company faithfully discharged that one." Later, when Viscosky thought it prudent to disappear from Jerome before Hillman caught on, he convinced police officials to give him free conduct pass through checkpoints, "so he could visit his sister in Jenners."

In August 1922, union miners agreed to a new contract that did not include non-union miners. The miners at Jerome and other Somerset County mines, left out of the contract, continued on for another twelve months, agreeing on August 14, 1923, to return to work finally having been exhausted by a process that, for them, produced little economic benefit immediately. At Jerome, Hillman Coal offered a general amnesty to most miners, if each returned to work as an individual and not as part of a local union. Nevertheless, the solid front displayed by Jerome miners laid the groundwork for the mine's eventual unionization in the 1930s. Further, as Hapgood, Blankenhorn, Beik, and others point out, the miners themselves felt the 1922-23 strike to be a victory. Prior to the strike, miners felt atomized, helpless, and hopeless; the coal towns of Somerset County were "visibly split" by ethnic divisions "admittedly...fostered by the coal companies" as a means of social control. "[C]oal mining families....[lived] within a social, economic and political system of profound autocracy thinly veiled by shallow, pragmatic paternalism." After the strike, Jerome emerged with the beginnings of an increasingly strong, tolerant social fabric, which remained tight-knit for several generations and still provides important unifying elements today.

== Environmental impact of coal mining activities at Jerome ==
The semi-bituminous coal bed at Jerome, part of the Upper Kittanning formation, was approximately six feet thick, capped by shale and limestone, with a smooth, hard sandstone floor. In 1911, the mine had a capacity of 1,700 tons a day, with an average daily output of 1,020 tons. The tipple had four loading tracks with a capacity of 80 cars. Within the tipple, coal was cleaned first by machine through shaker screens, then by hand, along a conveyor, and at loading. Refuse coal and rock was dumped in a hillside to the south of the tipple.

For the first 70-some years of its history, Jerome's landscape was dominated by this black, man-made mountain of coal mining wastes. The "bony pile," as it was called, loomed from the hillside south of Penn Avenue and east of Cross and Fifth Avenues. Only a few plant species were hardy enough to survive the hot, dry, nutrient-deficient conditions on the pile. Heavy metals, including arsenic and mercury, leached from the pile into the immediately adjacent area. The pile was removed in the 1970s when local electric generating stations found cost-effective ways to render additional coal out of the pile. A much smaller scar remains on the hillside.

Most water runoff from the Jerome mine emptied into the South Fork of Bens Creek at Thomas Mills. Bens Creek used to be a robust trout habitat. Mine effluent contained high concentrations of iron, which rendered downstream sections of Bens Creek effectively sterile from about 1900 to 1994. A remediation project (construction 1992-1994, re-engineered 2002) coordinated by the Stonycreek-Conemaugh River Improvement Project (SCRIP), a local non-governmental organization, restored Bens Creek by precipitating iron toxins from the effluent. The Bens Creek project, also known as the Rock Tunnel Project, is home to SCRIP's first mine drainage effort (see facts sheet on Bens Creek). SCRIP later restored other creeks and rivers in Somerset and Cambria Counties. Supplemental to the efforts of SCRIP, the Mountain Laurel Chapter of Trout Unlimited, a non-governmental organization, completed a substantial habitat improvement project aimed at increasing the number of fish that Bens Creek can hold. Bens Creek today again contains brook, brown and rainbow trout. Some of these fish are stocked while wild species can be found in headwaters.

== Jerome's churches ==
For much of its history, Jerome’s social life revolved around its churches. These churches are, in order of founding:

Maple Spring Church of the Brethren. Organized 1849, from predecessor congregation in Berlin, Somerset County. First church at current site—northeast corner, Spring Road and Maple Springs Road—1875. Adopted current name, 1894. Current structure, 1905, enlarged 1950, enlarged again 1968.

Holy Cross Roman Catholic Church. Organized 1911. Building, southeast corner, School Street and First Avenue, completed 1913. Parish merged with St. Anne’s Roman Catholic Church, Davidsville, 1995. Jerome building closed and sold.

The Assumption of the Holy Blessed Virgin Mary Russian Orthodox Church. Organized 1911. Building completed 1918, on plot between Front Avenue and Penn Avenue, to the west of current (2007) site of Jerome Church of the Nazarene. Congregation closed 1974 and building demolished.

Ss. Peter and Paul Byzantine Catholic Church. Organized 1913. Original building completed, 1913, rebuilt, on west side of Phillips Street near Coal Avenue, after fire 1935. Renovated 1985, 1996. Church is served as part of St. Mary’s church, Windber.

Jerome Evangelical Lutheran Church. Building, Penn Avenue at the foot of Oak Street, completed 1914 as Union Church, to provide worship space for several Protestant congregations, including United Brethren, Methodist, Presbyterian and Lutheran congregations. Lutheran congregation formally organized 1919. Union Church affiliated solely with Lutheranism on vote of congregation, 1925. Building enlarged 1974. Jerome building closed 1997, members moving to St. David Evangelical Lutheran Church in Davidsville or to St. Andrew Evangelical Lutheran Church, Boswell.

Jerome Church of the Nazarene. Organized 1928. Building, on north side of Penn Avenue at Front Avenue, completed 1969. Church closed circa 2014, members moving to New Life Church in Boswell.

(All street names verified via Google Maps, accessed 14 July 2007; link provided below.)

== Fraternal and community organizations ==
- American Legion Post 802, chartered Jan. 5, 1946.
- Jerome American Legion Ladies Auxiliary, organized 1947.
- Jerome Sportsmen's Association.
- Jerome Volunteer Fire Department, chartered June 2, 1952.
- Northern Somerset County Target Association, an organization to promote regional youth shooting sports and competition.
- Polish Falcons of America, Nest 556, organized 1914.
- At least four different buildings have hosted an elementary school at Jerome, from 1904 to 2011. The final building opened Jan. 1961, renovated in 1991, closed May 2011 and was sold at auction by the school district to a private bidder in Dec. 2011 for $200,000.

== Selected key references ==
- Blankenhorn, H. 1924. The Strike for Union: A Study of the Non-union Question in Coal and the Problems of a Democratic Movement; Based on the Record of the Somerset Strike, 1922-23. (H.W. Wilson Co., reprint Arno & The New York Times, 1969).
- Brophy, J. 1964. A Miner's Life. (University of Wisconsin Press). Chapter 14: The Somerset County Strike.
- Bussel, R. 1999. From Harvard to the Ranks of Labor: Powers Hapgood and the American Working Class. (Pennsylvania State University Press). Chapter 3: The Somerset Strike. ISBN 0-271-01897-6 (cloth); ISBN 0-271-01898-4 (paperback)
- Jerome: A Stroll in the Past. Commemorative book. 2000. Year 2000 Jerome Homecoming. (Spiral-bound book, published privately, Jerome).
