= Shaffer's Bridge =

- U.S. National Register of Historic Places
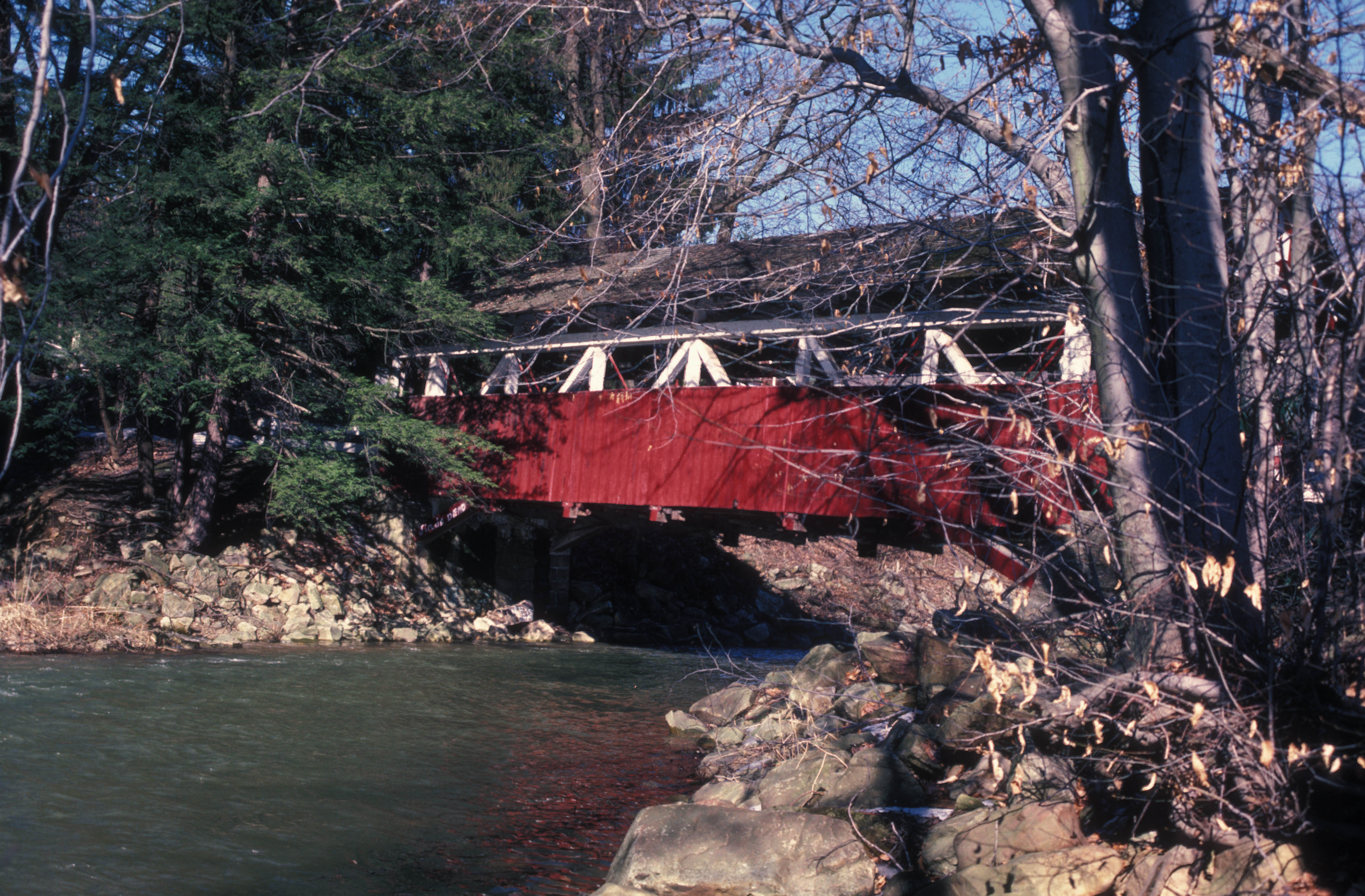

- Location within Pennsylvania Location within the United States
- Location: West of Tire Hill on Township 634, Conemaugh Township, Pennsylvania
- Coordinates: 40°16′52″N 78°57′52″W
- Area: 0.1 acres (0.040 ha)
- Built: 1877
- Architectural style: Burr arch
- MPS: Covered Bridges of Somerset County TR
- NRHP reference No.: 80003637
- Added to NRHP: December 10, 1980

The Shaffer's Bridge is a historic covered bridge in Conemaugh Township, Somerset County, Pennsylvania. It was built in 1877, and is a 68-foot-2-inch-long (20.78 m) Burr truss bridge, with a shingle covered gable roof. The bridge crosses Ben's Creek. It is one of 10 covered bridges in Somerset County.

It was added to the National Register of Historic Places in 1980.
