= Dom & Roland =

British DJ and record producer

- Angas in 2004

Background information
- Born: 1974
- Origin: London, England
- Genres: Drum and bass; techstep
- Occupations: DJ; producer; label owner
- Years active: 1995–present
- Labels: Moving Shadow; Metalheadz; Dom & Roland Productions; Suburban Records; 31 Records; Individual Recordings
- Formerly of: Current Affair; Dom & Rob; Neotech

Dominic Angas, better known by his stage name Dom & Roland, is a British drum and bass DJ and record producer. Active since the mid-1990s, Angas is recognised for his contributions to the techstep subgenre and his work with labels such as Moving Shadow, Metalheadz, and his own imprint, Dom & Roland Productions. His debut album, Industry (1998), is regarded as a significant release in the late 1990s drum and bass scene. In addition to his solo work, Angas has contributed to the development of the darker, experimental edge of drum and bass through numerous collaborations and remixes.

== Biography ==
=== Early life ===
Dominic Angas grew up in Shepherd's Bush, London. He spent five years in Germany during his childhood before returning to England, where he developed an interest in hip-hop during his teenage years. Angas transitioned to breakbeat music in his twenties and began exploring drum and bass production, following a friendship with Ed Rush.

=== Early career (1995–1996) ===
Angas' entry into the drum and bass scene began with No U-Turn's Nico Sykes, whom he persistently approached for studio time. After Sykes agreed, Angas collaborated with Brian Ferrier under the name Current Affairs, releasing their debut single, "East/Solstice" (1995), on Sykes' Saigon imprint. Their next release, "Cutting Edge/Turbulence" (1996), appeared on Moving Shadow and featured heavy drum breaks and basslines characteristic of the emerging techstep style. To further his skills, Angas took classes in studio engineering and production while working as a restaurant manager to support himself.

=== Dom & Roland (1996–1997) ===
Adopting the alias Dom & Roland, a reference to himself and his Roland sampler, Angas released "Dynamics/The Planets" in early 1996. That same year, he signed a non-exclusive contract with Moving Shadow and released tracks such as "The Storm/Sonic Shock" and "You're Something Else/Interstellar Jazz" (1996). By the end of the year, Angas had released four singles and contributed to compilation tracks and remixes, including Flytronix's work and the Art of Noise's drum and bass remix album.

In 1997, Moving Shadow founder Rob Playford enlisted Angas for the label's 100th release, resulting in the track "Distorted Dreams", a collaboration with Playford. Other releases from this period include "Resistance/Hydrolics"(1997) and "The Drones" under the Current Affairs alias. Angas also collaborated with Ed Rush as Neotech on "Valves/Terminal" and with Optical on "Quadrant 6/Concrete Shoes". These tracks expanded his exploration of techstep, though some critics noted a reliance on familiar production techniques within the subgenre.

=== Debut (1998–2004) ===
Dom & Roland released his debut album, Industry, in 1998 on Moving Shadow. The album incorporated collaborations with Optical and reflected the darker, technical sound of the late 1990s drum and bass scene. Reviews were mixed, with some highlighting its innovative approach while others critiqued its alignment with established techstep elements.

Angas' subsequent albums, Back for the Future (2002) and Chronology (2004), were also released on Moving Shadow. Chronology featured collaborations with artists such as Konflict, Skynet, and Hive and marked the end of his association with the label.

=== 2004–present: Dom & Roland Productions and later work ===
After leaving Moving Shadow, Angas founded his own label, Dom & Roland Productions (DRP). His fourth album, Through the Looking Glass (2008), included both new material and previously released tracks from DRP. He followed this with No Strings Attached (2009), which featured collaborations with Noisia, Amon Tobin, and Rob Playford, and The Big Bang (2011).

In the mid-2010s, Angas joined Metalheadz, a label founded by Goldie, and continues releasing music under the Metalheadz imprint.

== Discography ==
=== Studio albums ===
List of studio albums, with selected chart positions
Title	Album details	Peak chart positions		
Title	Album details	UK Dance	UK Physical	UK Vinyl
Industry	Released: 28 September 1998; Label: Moving Shadow	—	—	—
Back for the Future	Released: 2002; Label: Moving Shadow	—	—	—
Chronology	Released: 2004; Label: Moving Shadow	—	—	—
Through the Looking Glass	Released: 2008; Label: Dom & Roland Productions	—	—	—
No Strings Attached	Released: 2009; Label: Dom & Roland Productions	—	—	—
The Big Bang	Released: 2011; Label: Dom & Roland Productions	—	—	—
Last Refuge of a Scoundrel	Released: 2016; Label: Metalheadz	11	53 (Note: Charted as a single)	37 (Note: Charted as a single)
Lost in the Moment	Released: 2020; Label: Metalheadz	—	—	—
Against a Dark Background	Released: 2023; Label: Metalheadz	—	—	—
"—" denotes a recording that did not chart or was not released in that territory.

=== Singles ===
List of singles, with selected chart positions
Title	Year	Peak chart positions				Albums
Title	Year	UK	UK Dance	UK Indie	UK Physical	Albums
"Dynamics"	1996	—	26	—	—	Non-album single
"You're Something Else"	1996	—	29	—	—	Non-album single
"The Storm"	1996	—	19	—	—	Non-album single
"Resistance"	1997	—	17	—	—	Non-album single
"Distorted Dreams" (with Rob Playford)	1997	—	—	—	—	Non-album single
"Trauma" "Transmissions"	1998	—	6	—	—	Non-album single
"Timeframe"	1998	99	2	24	99	Industry
"Parasite"	1999	—	4	42	—	Back for the Future
"Killa Bullet"	1999	—	9	34	—	Back for the Future
"Can't Punish Me"	2000	—	26	30	—	Back for the Future
"Imagination"	2001	—	29	35	—	Non-album single
"Dynamo" "Adrenaline"	2003	96	—	31	96	Non-album single
"Dance All Night"	2004	—	23	39	—	Chronology
"Unofficial Ja"	2013	—	—	—	44	Non-album single
"Search for Meaning" "Abbott & Co"	2024	—	—	—	93	Non-album single
"—" denotes a recording that did not chart or was not released in that territory.
