= Franklin Township, Carbon County, Pennsylvania =

Township in Pennsylvania, US

Franklin Township
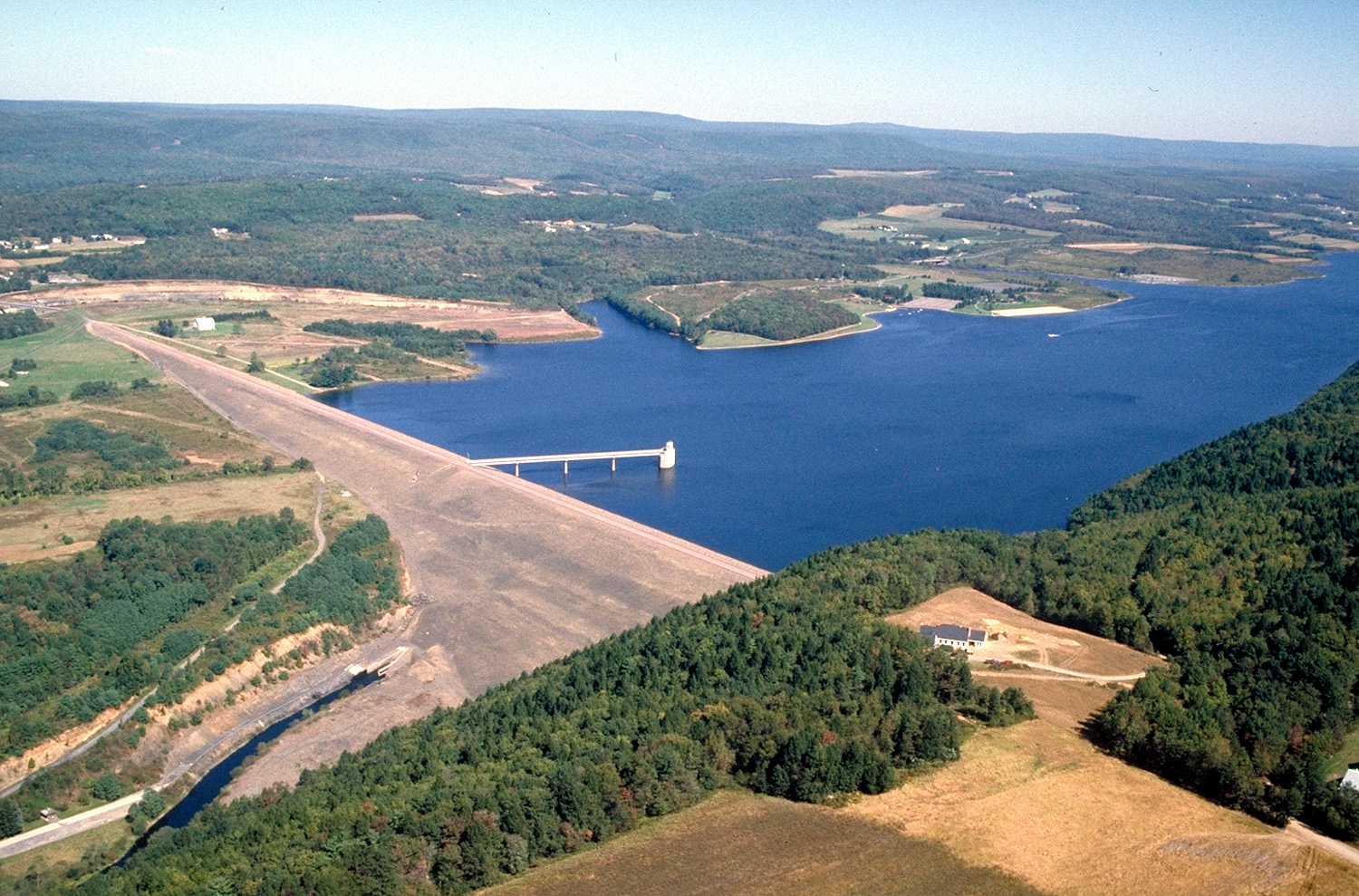
- Beltzville Dam in Franklin Township in April 2007

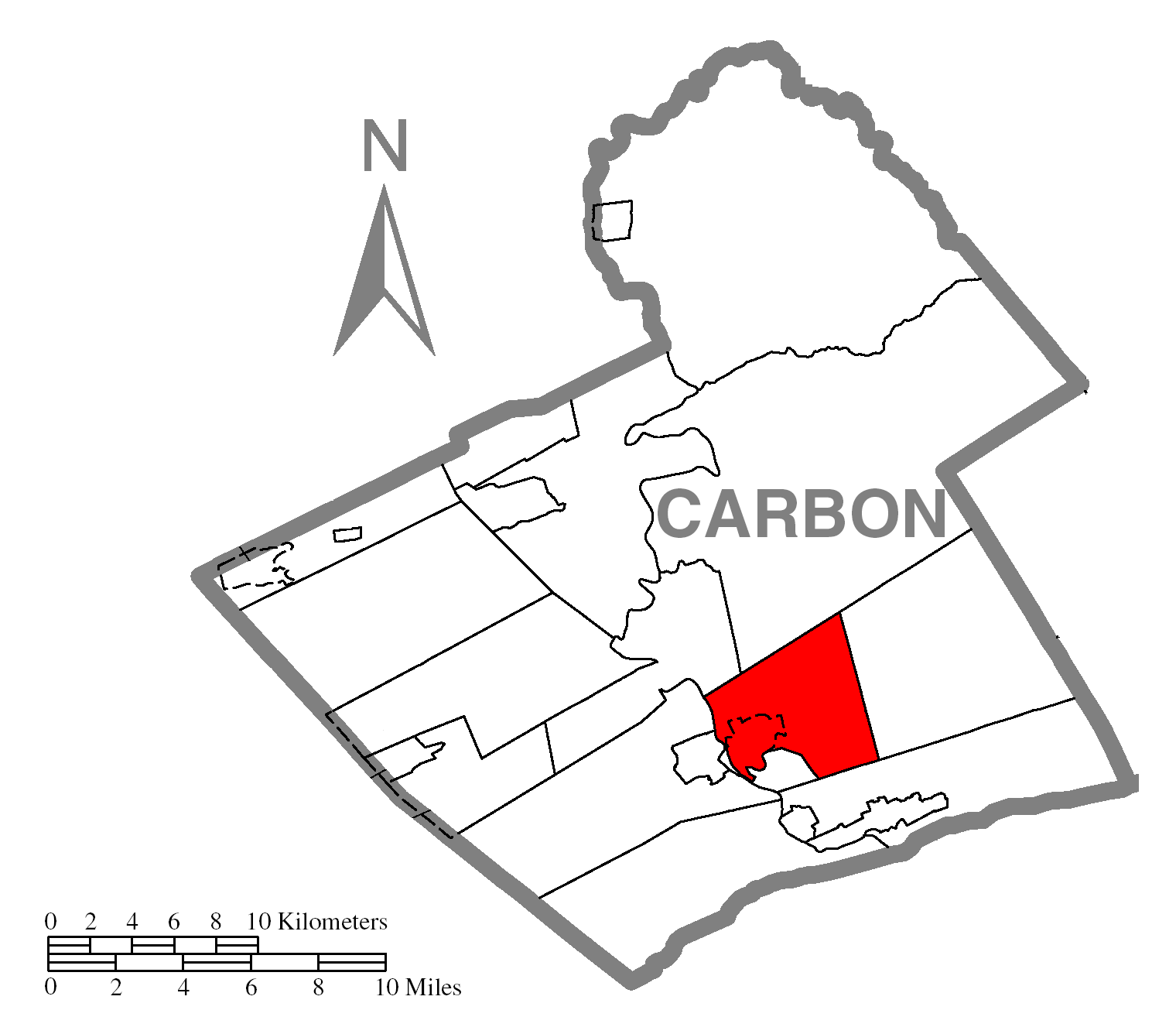
- Location of Franklin Township in Carbon County, Pennsylvania

- Location of Carbon County in Pennsylvania
- Coordinates: 40°51′00″N 75°39′59″W
- Country: United States
- State: Pennsylvania
- County: Carbon
- Settled: 1750s
- Incorporated: January 2, 1851
- Named for: Benjamin Franklin

Area
  - Total: 15.67 sq mi (40.58 km^{2})
  - Land: 15.16 sq mi (39.26 km^{2})
  - Water: 0.51 sq mi (1.33 km^{2})
- Elevation: 574 ft (175 m)

Population (2010)
  - Total: 4,262
  - Estimate (2016): 4,126
  - Density: 272/sq mi (105.1/km^{2})
- Time zone: UTC-5 (EST)
  - Summer (DST): UTC-4 (EDT)
- ZIP code: 18235
- Area code: 610
- FIPS code: 42-025-27368
- Website: www.franklintownshipcarboncounty.com

Franklin Township is a second class township in Carbon County, Pennsylvania. It is part of Northeastern Pennsylvania. The population was 4,262 at the 2010 census. A portion of Beltzville State Park is in Franklin Township.

== History ==
The Province of Pennsylvania was created in 1681 when King Charles II granted a charter of land in America to William Penn.

=== 18th century ===
After the death of Penn, his sons John and Thomas became owners of Pennsylvania. The land containing Franklin Township was deeded by the Lenape Indians during the Walking Purchase in 1737.

The first settlers in the area were the Solt family, who settled on land what is now part of Beltzville State Park sometime in the 1750s. The land included a farm and eventually a grist mill.

The territory of Franklin Township was part of the Old Towamensing Township. It became a part of Upper Towamensing Township (now just called Towamensing Township) in 1841.

In 1850, residents petitioned for separation from Upper Towamensing and Franklin Township became its own jurisdiction on January 2, 1851.

The township is named after Benjamin Franklin, who visited the area in 1756 when erecting the nearby Fort Allen during the French and Indian War.

== Geography ==
The township is located in southern Carbon County and is drained by the Lehigh River on its western boundary. The northern boundary runs along the base of Bear Mountain. Pohopoco Creek is the primary tributary of the Lehigh within the township and is impounded in the township by Beltzville Dam to form Beltzville Lake. Villages in the township include Beltzville, Weissport East, Harrity, Long Run, North Weissport, and Walcksville.

According to the U.S. Census Bureau, the township has a total area of 15.7 square miles (40.6 km^{2}), of which 15.2 square miles (39.3 km^{2}) is land and 0.50 square miles (1.3 km^{2}), or 3.27%, is water.

=== Neighboring municipalities ===
- Parryville (southwest)
- Mahoning Township (west)
- Weissport (west)
- Lehighton (west)
- Jim Thorpe (northwest)
- Penn Forest Township (north)
- Towamensing Township (east)
- Lower Towamensing Township (south)

=== Climate ===
Franklin Township has a humid continental climate (Dfa/Dfb) and the hardiness zone is 6a except near the river where it is 6b. Average monthly temperatures in Harrity range from 27.7 °F in January to 72.5 °F in July.

== Demographics ==
Historical population
Census	Pop.	Note	%±
2000	4,243		—
2010	4,262		0.4%
2016 (est.)	4,126		−3.2%
U.S. Decennial Census

As of the census of 2000, there were 4,243 people, 1,671 households, and 1,256 families residing in the township. The population density was 291.4 inhabitants per square mile (112.5/km^{2}). There were 1,819 housing units at an average density of 124.9 per square mile (48.2/km^{2}). The racial makeup of the township was 98.87% White, 0.07% African American, 0.14% Native American, 0.35% Asian, 0.09% from other races, and 0.47% from two or more races. Hispanic or Latino of any race were 0.45% of the population.

There were 1,671 households, out of which 28.8% had children under the age of 18 living with them, 64.0% were married couples living together, 6.9% had a female householder with no husband present, and 24.8% were non-families. 19.5% of all households were made up of individuals, and 8.5% had someone living alone who was 65 years of age or older. The average household size was 2.54 and the average family size was 2.90.

In the township the population was spread out, with 21.4% under the age of 18, 6.5% from 18 to 24, 29.9% from 25 to 44, 27.7% from 45 to 64, and 14.6% who were 65 years of age or older. The median age was 40 years. For every 100 females there were 101.1 males. For every 100 females age 18 and over, there were 98.5 males.

The median income for a household in the township was $43,106, and the median income for a family was $50,323. Males had a median income of $34,801 versus $24,429 for females. The per capita income for the township was $19,166. About 2.6% of families and 4.3% of the population were below the poverty line, including 5.4% of those under age 18 and 6.2% of those age 65 or over.

== Transportation ==
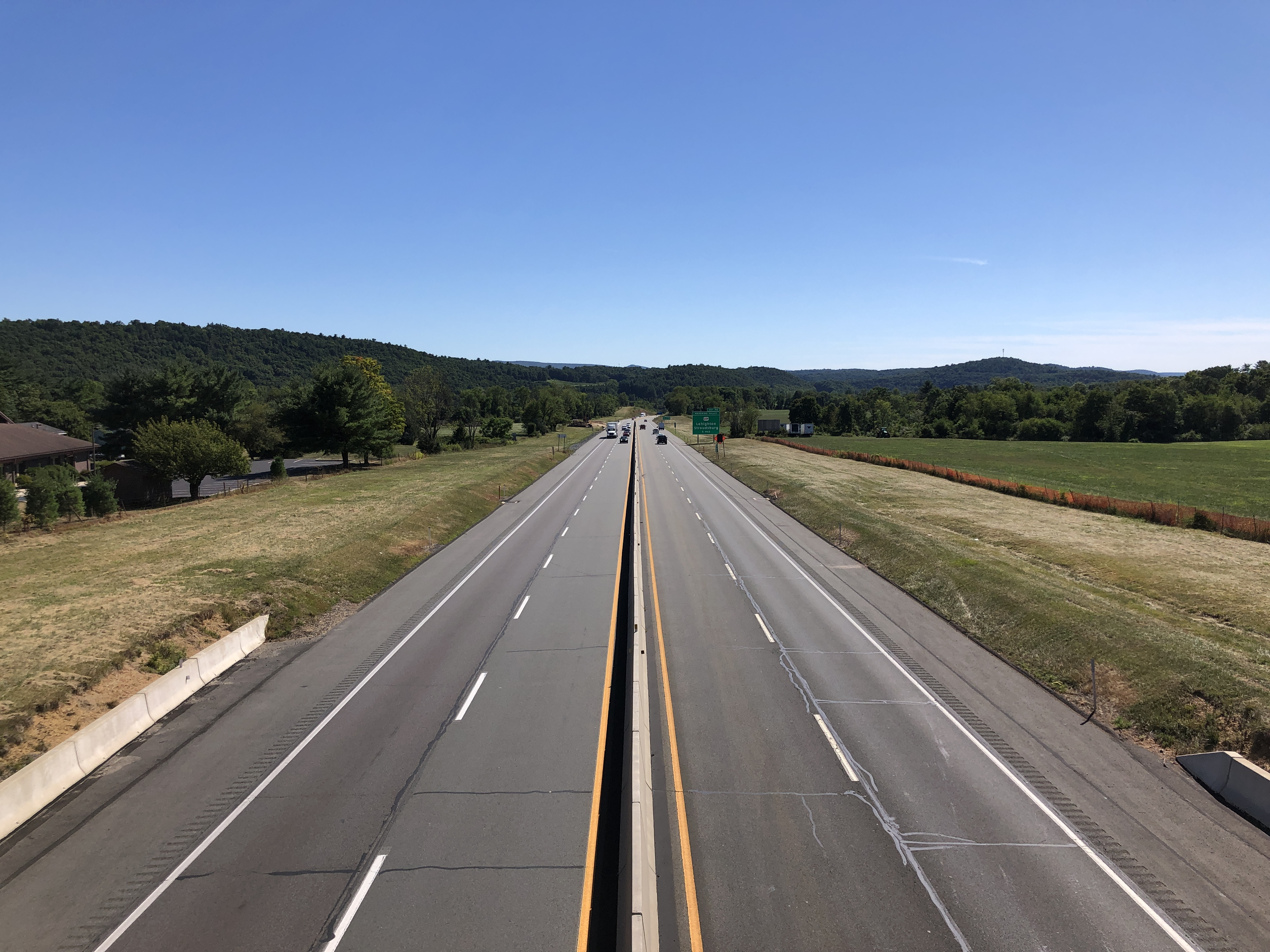
I-476/Pennsylvania Turnpike Northeast Extension southbound in Franklin Township

As of 2015, there were 63.09 miles (101.53 km) of public roads in Franklin Township, of which 4.00 miles (6.44 km) were maintained by the Pennsylvania Turnpike Commission (PTC), 13.08 miles (21.05 km) were maintained by the Pennsylvania Department of Transportation (PennDOT) and 46.01 miles (74.05 km) were maintained by the township.

Franklin Township hosts the Mahoning Valley Interchange of Interstate 476 with U.S. Route 209. Pennsylvania Route 248 connects US 209 near Weissport with the Lehigh Valley region, including Allentown and Bethlehem, via Lehigh Gap.
