= Hillcroft, Pennsylvania =

Neighborhood in York, Pennsylvania, U.S.

Coordinates: 39°56′46″N 76°42′15″W

Hillcroft is one of the neighborhoods of York in York County, Pennsylvania, United States. Hillcroft is located in Spring Garden Township.
