= Helen Furnace, Pennsylvania =

Unincorporated community in Pennsylvania, US

Coordinates: 41°17′32″N 79°18′42″W

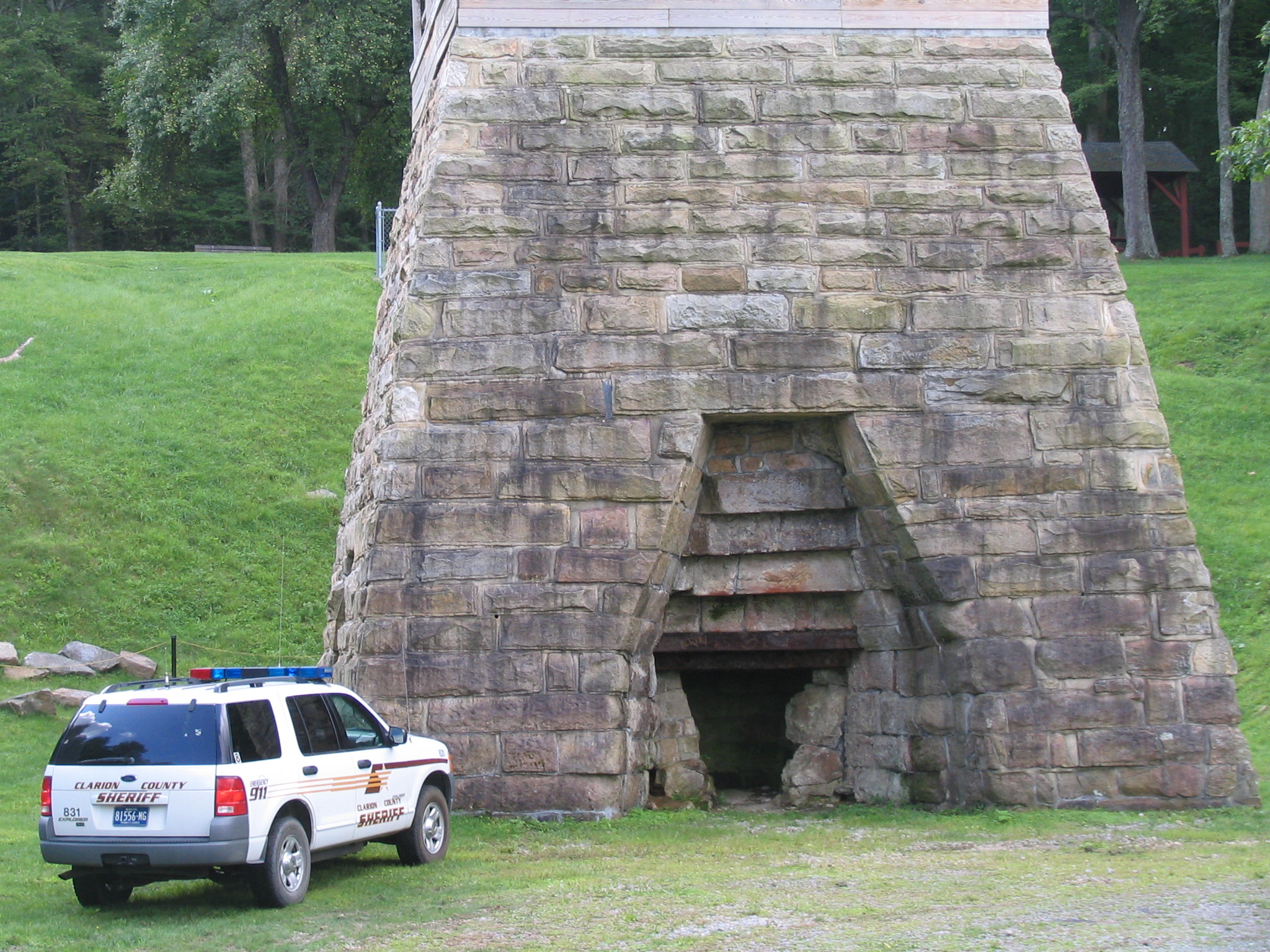
Ruins of Hieland blast furnace

Helen Furnace is an unincorporated community in Clarion County, in the U.S. state of Pennsylvania.

== History ==
"Helen" most likely is a corruption of Hielander/Highlander, this name being adopted because a first settler was a Scottish Highlander. Variant names are "Helen" and "Hieland Furnace".
