= Hinterleiter, Pennsylvania =

Unincorporated community in Pennsylvania, US

- Unincorporated community
- Location within Pennsylvania
- Coordinates: 40°30′50″N 75°43′57″W
- Country: United States
- State: Pennsylvania
- County: Berks
- Township: Maxatawny
- Elevation: 436 ft (133 m)
- Time zone: UTC-5 (Eastern (EST))
  - Summer (DST): UTC-4 (EDT)
- Area codes: 610 and 484
- GNIS feature ID: 1203817

Hinterleiter is an unincorporated community in Maxatawny Township in Berks County, Pennsylvania, United States. Hinterleiter is located at the intersection of Hinterleiter and Quarry Roads.
