= Industrial, West Virginia =

- Unincorporated community
- Location within West Virginia Location within the United States
- Coordinates: 39°16′41″N 80°34′53″W
- Country: United States
- State: West Virginia
- County: Doddridge
- Elevation: 1,086 ft (331 m)
- Time zone: UTC-5 (Eastern (EST))
  - Summer (DST): UTC-4 (EDT)
- ZIP code: 26375
- Area codes: 304 & 681
- GNIS feature ID: 1554770

Industrial is an unincorporated community in Doddridge County, West Virginia, United States. Industrial is located along County Route 38 and the North Bend Rail Trail, 1.25 miles (2.01 km) west-southwest of Salem. Industrial had a post office, which closed on November 2, 2002.
