= Industry, Missouri =

Extinct hamlet in Missouri, U.S.

Coordinates: 38.4321439°N 93.9294577°W

Industry is an extinct town in Henry County, in the U.S. state of Missouri.

Industry was platted in 1883. A post office called Industry was established in 1881, and remained in operation until 1887.
