= Industria (company) =

Icelandic multinational Internet-deployment business

- Type: Private limited company
- Industry: systems integration, fiber deployments
- Founded: 2003
- Headquarters: Reykjavík, Iceland
- Key people: Erling Freyr Guðmundsson, CEO
- Number of employees: 250
- Website: http://www.industria.com/

Industria was a multinational company with a focus on fibre to the home solutions and systems integration.

== Background ==
Established in Reykjavík, Iceland in 2003, Industria offered consultancy and systems integration services for fibre to the home and triple-play operators, installed broadband hardware and software, and offered consultancy services in the field of broadband and telephony.

Industria handled the implementation of Ireland's first massive fibre and ADSL2+ networks for Magnet Networks.

Acting as a professional services provider for the Irish Department of Communications' Regional Broadband Programme, Industria was appointed to provide professional services to in excess of 60% of the programme to date. Industria was involved in completing the design, procurement and project management of the construction of approximately 450,000 metres of fibre optic networks in 50 cities and towns together with the design of wireless networks in 20 towns around Ireland at a cost of approximately €70m.

Industria developed and designed a Digital Living products and services, used by property builders. The company did have big investment linked with new property developments in Ireland in 2007. During the crash in 2009 of the Irish property market, Industria was not able to fund further the fibre-to-the-home deployments as most of the company's property development customers and partners went bankrupt. This led to Industria shutting down its operation in December 2012.

== Awards ==
- Industria was in 2007 named by CNBC European Business as one of the 50 key innovators among European companies.
- In 2007, Industria won a Red Herring 100 Europe Award for its broadband software solution.
