= Harrity, Pennsylvania =

Village in Pennsylvania, U.S.

- Unincorporated community
- Location within Pennsylvania Location within the United States
- Coordinates: 40°50′24″N 75°40′04″W
- Country: United States
- State: Pennsylvania
- County: Carbon
- Township: Franklin
- Time zone: UTC-5 (Eastern (EST))
  - Summer (DST): UTC-4 (EDT)
- ZIP code: 18235
- Area code(s): 610
- GNIS feature ID: 1203754

Harrity is a village in Franklin Township, Carbon County, Pennsylvania on the Pohopoco Creek, which flows westward from Beltzville Lake into the Lehigh River to the south of the village in Parryville. U.S. Route 209 forms the southern boundary and meets Interstate 476, which forms the western boundary, at the Mahoning Valley Interchange in Harrity. It serves as the gateway to Beltzville State Park from the west and the NE Extension (I-476). It uses the Lehighton ZIP code of 18235.
