= Industria =

Industria can refer to:

- Industria (company), defunct Icelandic Internet deployment multinational
- Industria (settlement), lost Roman city on what is now Monteu da Po in Turin, Italy
- Industria (typeface), sans-serif typeface designed by Neville Brody in 1984
- 389 Industria, an asteroid
