= Henningsville, Pennsylvania =

Unincorporated community in Pennsylvania, US

- Unincorporated community
- Location within Pennsylvania
- Coordinates: 40°28′0″N 75°40′16″W
- Country: United States
- State: Pennsylvania
- County: Berks
- Township: Longswamp
- Elevation: 1,001 ft (305 m)
- Time zone: UTC-5 (Eastern (EST))
  - Summer (DST): UTC-4 (EDT)
- Area codes: 610 and 484
- GNIS feature ID: 1203782

Henningsville is an unincorporated community in Longswamp Township in Berks County, Pennsylvania, United States. Henningsville is located at the intersection of Woodside Avenue and Greiss Street.
