= Industrial group =

Industrial group may refer to:

- Industry, a segment of the economy
- Industrial Revolution, the development of industry in the 19th century
- Industrial society, one that has undergone industrialization
- Industrial engineering group (disambiguation)
- Industrial Groups which were formed by the Australian Labor Party in the late 1940s, to combat Communist Party influence in trade
- an industrial concern, see Concern (business)
- an industrial group that is an organization of companies in different industries with common ownership interests, which include firms necessary to manufacture and sell products—a network of manufacturers, suppliers, marketing organizations, distributors, retailers, and creditors
