= Industry (Dom & Roland album) =

Studio album by Dom & Roland
- Released: 28 September 1998
- Studio: Moving Shadow (UK)
- Genre: Techstep
- Length: 77:14
- Label: Moving Shadow
- Producer: Dominic Angas

Dom & Roland chronology
Industry (1998)	Back for the Future (2002)

Singles from Industry
- 1. "Timeframe" Released: September 1998

Industry is the debut studio album by the British drum and bass producer Dom & Roland, released on 28 September 1998 through Moving Shadow. Produced using a range of equipment, including a Roland sampler and a Yamaha 01 digital mixer, the album incorporates experimental techniques and draws on influences from science fiction.

The album features a mix of darker, technical drum and bass tracks, including collaborations with producer Optical. Its single "Timeframe" reached number 99 on the UK Singles Chart and number two on the UK Dance Chart. While initial reception was mixed, Industry has since been regarded by some as an influential work in the drum and bass genre.

== Production ==
Dom & Roland produced Industry at the Moving Shadow label's studios, which had previously served as David Bowie's writing room. Angas used a variety of equipment, including a Roland S-760 sampler, an Atari system, a Sequential Circuits Pro-One synthesiser, and an E-mu sampler. He also employed one of the first Yamaha digital mixers, the Yamaha 01, which allowed for precise live adjustments to effects such as delay and reverb during recording.

Dom & Roland approached the album with a personal and experimental mindset, describing it as a product of a "life-changing, tumultuous time". Inspired by science fiction films such as Blade Runner, he sought to create innovative and unique sounds, often manipulating and processing audio through unconventional methods. His label allowed him the space to experiment with chopping and twisting drums and synths. Angas described his process as driven by a need to create for himself rather than for an audience, blending science fiction elements with the technical precision of drum and bass production.

== Composition ==
The opening track "Thunder" was influenced by the Metalheadz's drum and bass club night at the Blue Note. Angas used a low-cost distortion pedal from Maplin to process the track's breaks, intentionally using older batteries for the pedal, stating that "the older the battery that I put in it, the better it sounded". Similarly, "Remote View" incorporated experimental techniques, such as playing sounds through speakers and recording their output in enclosed spaces to create unique textures. The track was inspired by the concept of the CIA's remote viewing program, although the music does not directly reference it. "Connected" was built around the idea of creating a sci-fi-inspired sound with a dark, atmospheric tone. Angas prioritised this aesthetic over traditional club-focused dynamics. In contrast, "Time", co-produced with Optical, had a more refined and balanced sound. The two producers exchanged samples using ZIP disks and worked with tools like the Sequential Circuits Pro-One and the E-mu sampler to develop the track.

On "Spirit Train", Angas sampled a Dillinja beat and processed it extensively to create a new sound. He described spending weeks on layers of sound to develop the final composition. "Elektra" incorporated classical music elements, with patterns repeated across instruments and a dynamic structure that contrasted light and dark sections. The track featured a dreamy introduction leading to heavier beats and was later used in the BBC series Merseyside Blues. "Timeframe" reflected Angas's approach to constructing beats by combining individual drum hits from various sources rather than using pre-made breakbeats. The hi-hats and other percussion were distorted and resampled to achieve a different sound from contemporaries. "City", inspired by the film The City of Lost Children, blended processed string patches with bass sounds derived from pitched-down piano samples.

"Chained on Two Sides" incorporated vocals from Shanie, which Angas rearranged and treated as part of the instrumental texture. The track reused elements of the beat from "Spirit Train", continuing Angas' practice of evolving ideas across compositions. "Anaesthetic", another collaboration with Optical, focused on filter effects within the E-mu sampler, with the track featuring dynamic shifts between heavily filtered and clean sections. The title track, "Industry", involved experimentation with unconventional rhythms. Angas layered kicks and snares in ways that deviated from typical drum patterns, treating the breakbeats more like percussion. "Kinetic" incorporated samples from Blade Runner, with Angas using less-common portions of the soundtrack and altering them through pitching and processing.

== Release and reception ==
Professional ratings
Review scores
Source	Rating
AllMusic	4/5 stars

Industry was released on 28 September 1998 through Moving Shadow. The album's lead single, "Timeframe", was released around the same time, reaching number 99 on the UK Singles Chart and number two on the UK Dance Chart.

Initial reception to Industry was mixed. In Drum 'n' Bass: The Rough Guide, journalist Peter Shapiro criticised the album for relying on familiar elements of the techstep style. Shapiro argued that the album "did nothing to convince anyone" of the genre's progression and characterised it as "a preponderance of stale two-step beats".

Retrospectively, Industry has been described as an influential drum and bass album by sources such as AllMusic and Future Music. AllMusic's John Bush praised the album, rating it four-out-of-five stars. He described it as having a "menacing undertone" and "off-kilter effects hitting off the beat."

== Track listing ==
All tracks are written by Dominic Angas except where noted.

Industry track listing
No.	Title	Writer(s)	Length
1.	"Thunder"		6:02
2.	"Remote View"		6:24
3.	"Connected"		7:29
4.	"Time"		7:01
5.	"Spirit Train"		6:23
6.	"Elektra"		7:32
7.	"Timeframe"	Dominic Angas; Matt Quinn	6:39
8.	"City"		6:30
9.	"Chained on Two Sides"		6:16
10.	"Anaesthetic"	Angas; Quinn	6:12
11.	"Industry"		4:57
12.	"Kinetic"		5:49

Vinyl edition
No.	Title	Length
1.	"Thunder"	6:01
2.	"Connected"	7:29
3.	"Spirit Train"	6:22
4.	"Elektra"	7:32
5.	"City"	6:30
6.	"Chained On Two Sides"	6:16
7.	"Time Frame"	6:39
8.	"Industry"	4:57
9.	"Remote View"	6:24
10.	"Kinetic"	6:48
Total length:		64:01

== Personnel ==
Album credits adapted from AllMusic:

- Dom & Roland – Primary artist, composer
- Optical – Assistant producer (tracks 7, 10)
- Shanie – Vocals
