= Conemaugh Township, Somerset County, Pennsylvania =

Township in Pennsylvania, US

Coordinates: 40°14′00″N 79°00′29″W

- Township
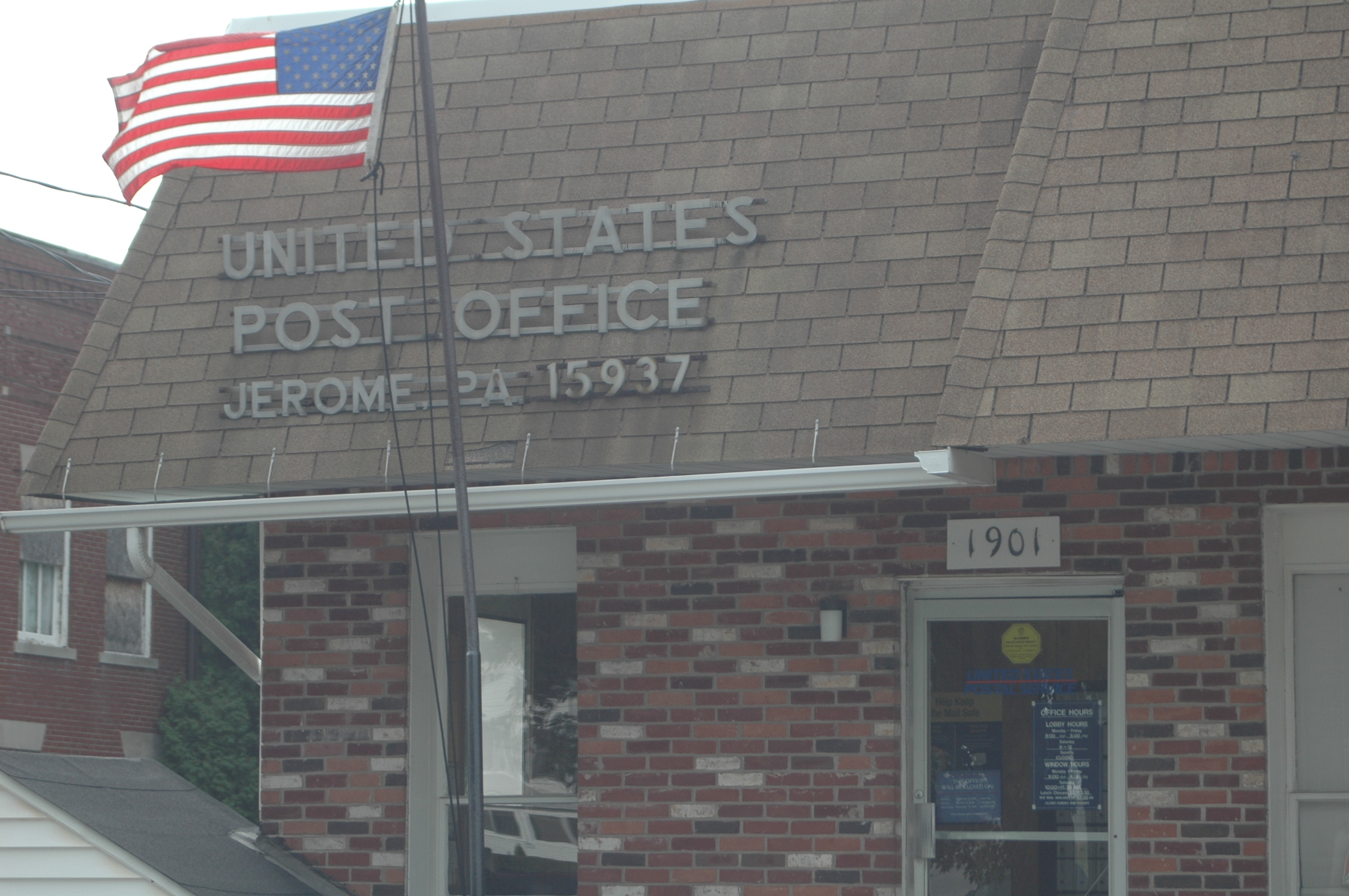
- The post office in Jerome

- Logo

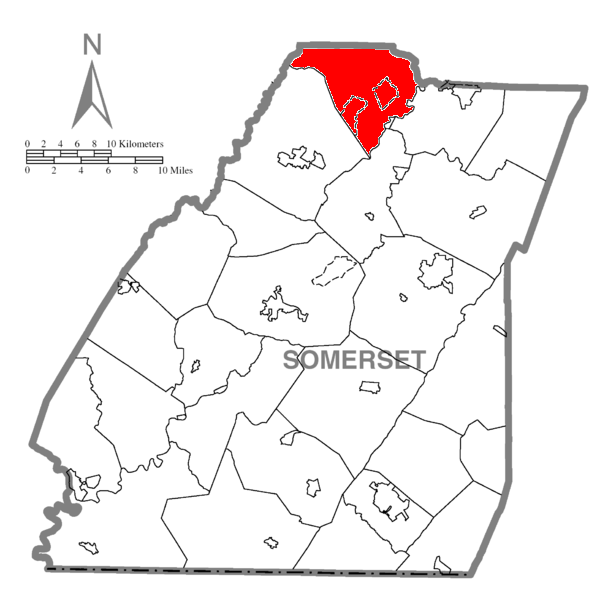
- Map of Somerset County, Pennsylvania Highlighting Conemaugh Township

- Map of Somerset County, Pennsylvania
- Country: United States
- State: Pennsylvania
- County: Somerset

Area
  - Total: 41.85 sq mi (108.38 km^{2})
  - Land: 41.27 sq mi (106.90 km^{2})
  - Water: 0.58 sq mi (1.49 km^{2})

Population (2020)
  - Total: 6,760 ▼
  - Estimate (2022): 6,669
  - Density: 168.5/sq mi (65.07/km^{2})
- Time zone: UTC-5 (Eastern (EST))
  - Summer (DST): UTC-4 (EDT)
- FIPS code: 42-111-15568
- Website: www.contwpsupers.us

Conemaugh Township is a township in Somerset County, Pennsylvania, United States. The population was 6,760 at the 2020 census. It is part of the Johnstown, Pennsylvania, Metropolitan Statistical Area. Conemaugh Township includes the towns of Jerome, Davidsville, Tire Hill, Thomas Mills, part of Holsopple, and surrounding countryside.

== History ==
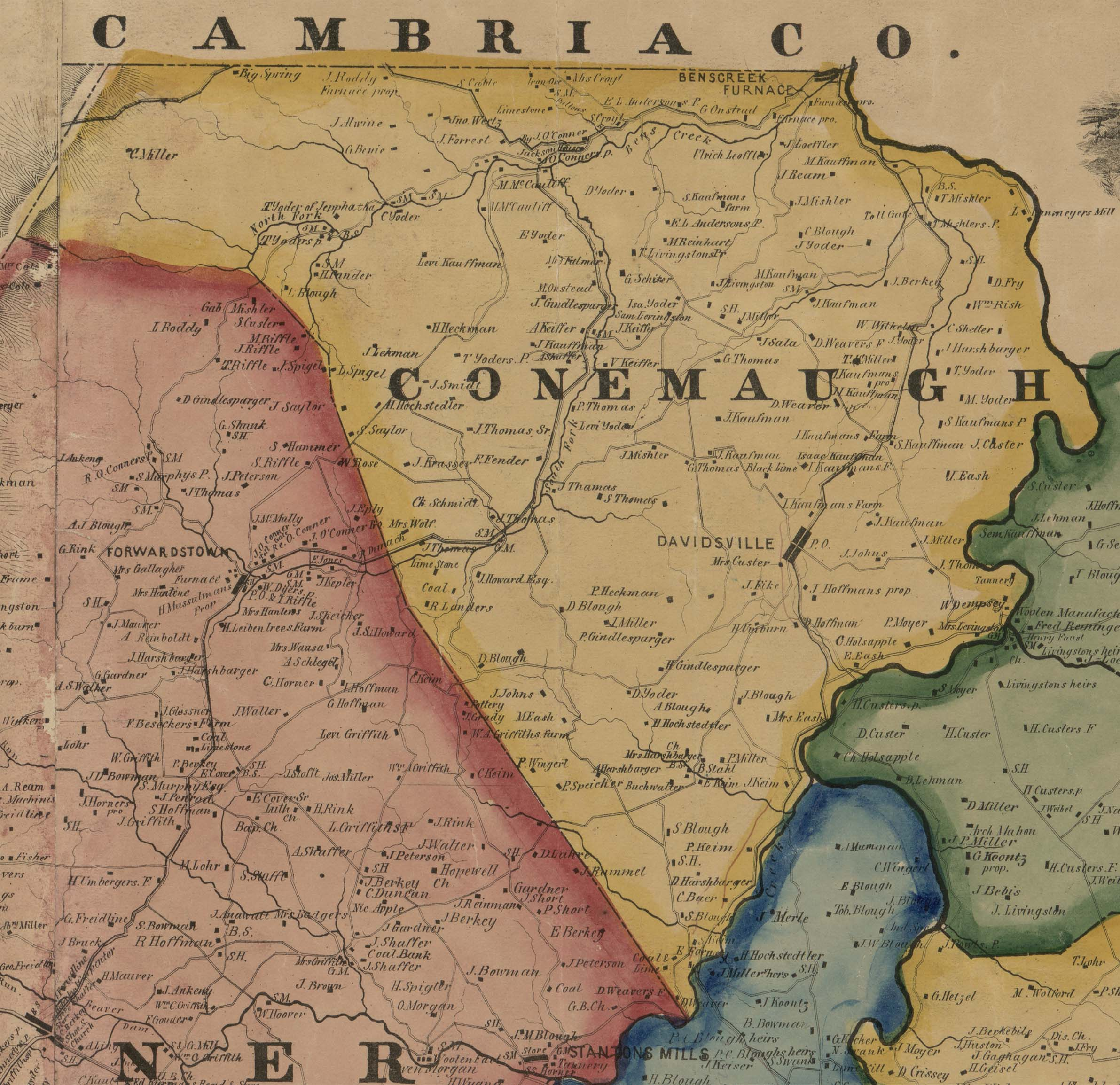
Conemaugh Township, Somerset County, Pennsylvania, 1860

The Shaffer's Bridge was added to the National Register of Historic Places in 1980.

== Geography ==
According to the United States Census Bureau, the township has a total area of 41.9 square miles (109 km^{2}), of which 41.3 square miles (107 km^{2}) is land and 0.6 square miles (1.6 km^{2}) (1.34%) is water. Conemaugh Township is bordered by Jenner Township to the southwest, Quemahoning Township to the southeast, Paint Township to the east, and Cambria County to the north.

== Demographics ==
Historical population
Census	Pop.	Note	%±
2010	7,279		—
2020	6,760		−7.1%
2022 (est.)	6,669		−1.3%
U.S. Decennial Census

As of the census of 2000, there were 7,452 people, 2,950 households, and 2,203 families residing in the township. The population density was 180.3 inhabitants per square mile (69.6/km^{2}). There were 3,089 housing units at an average density of 74.7 per square mile (28.8/km^{2}). The racial makeup of the township was 99.53% White, 0.04% African American, 0.07% Native American, 0.12% Asian, 0.01% Pacific Islander, 0.05% from other races, and 0.17% from two or more races. Hispanic or Latino of any race were 0.42% of the population.

There were 2,950 households, out of which 28.3% had children under the age of 18 living with them, 63.4% were married couples living together, 8.6% had a female householder with no husband present, and 25.3% were non-families. 22.8% of all households were made up of individuals, and 13.1% had someone living alone who was 65 years of age or older. The average household size was 2.48 and the average family size was 2.92.

In the township the population was spread out, with 21.8% under the age of 18, 6.5% from 18 to 24, 25.6% from 25 to 44, 25.2% from 45 to 64, and 20.9% who were 65 years of age or older. The median age was 43 years. For every 100 females, there were 91.6 males. For every 100 females age 18 and over, there were 90.3 males.

The median income for a household in the township was $30,530, and the median income for a family was $36,798. Males had a median income of $30,000 versus $20,786 for females. The per capita income for the township was $16,034. About 4.4% of families and 6.6% of the population were below the poverty line, including 8.1% of those under age 18 and 8.3% of those age 65 or over.
