= Industry, Allegheny County, Pennsylvania =

Community in Pennsylvania, US

Industry, Pennsylvania
- Unincorporated community Census designated place
- Location within Pennsylvania Location within the United States
- Coordinates: 40°15′59″N 79°47′35″W
- Country: United States
- State: Pennsylvania
- County: Allegheny

Area
  - Total: 0.290 sq mi (0.75 km^{2})
  - Land: 0.258 sq mi (0.67 km^{2})
  - Water: 0.032 sq mi (0.083 km^{2})
- Elevation: 784 ft (239 m)
- Time zone: UTC-5 (Eastern (EST))
  - Summer (DST): UTC-4 (EDT)
- Area code: 724

Industry is an unincorporated community and census-designated place in Allegheny County, Pennsylvania.

== Demographics ==
Historical population
Census	Pop.	Note	%±
U.S. Decennial Census

The United States Census Bureau first defined Industry as a census designated place in 2023.
