= Seanor, Pennsylvania =

Unincorporated community in Pennsylvania, US

Seanor
- Unincorporated community
- Location within the state of Pennsylvania Seanor (the United States)
- Coordinates: 40°12′43″N 78°53′54″W
- Country: United States
- State: Pennsylvania
- County: Somerset
- Elevation: 1,483 ft (452 m)
- Time zone: UTC-5 (Eastern (EST))
  - Summer (DST): UTC-4 (EDT)
- ZIP codes: 15953
- GNIS feature ID: 1187197

Seanor is an unincorporated community and coal town in Somerset County, Pennsylvania, United States. Its post office closed in 2004.
