= Hiyasota, Pennsylvania =

Unincorporated community in Pennsylvania, US

Hiyasota
- Unincorporated community
- Location within the state of Pennsylvania Hiyasota (the United States)
- Coordinates: 40°12′10″N 78°58′19″W
- Country: United States
- State: Pennsylvania
- County: Somerset
- Elevation: 1,781 ft (543 m)
- Time zone: UTC-5 (Eastern (EST))
  - Summer (DST): UTC-4 (EDT)
- GNIS feature ID: 1212296

Hiyasota is an unincorporated community and coal town near Jerome in Somerset County, Pennsylvania, United States. Penn Smokeless Coal Company operated two mines in Hiyasota in 1918.
