= Hollsopple, Pennsylvania =

Borough in Pennsylvania, US

Hollsopple, Pennsylvania Benson
- Borough
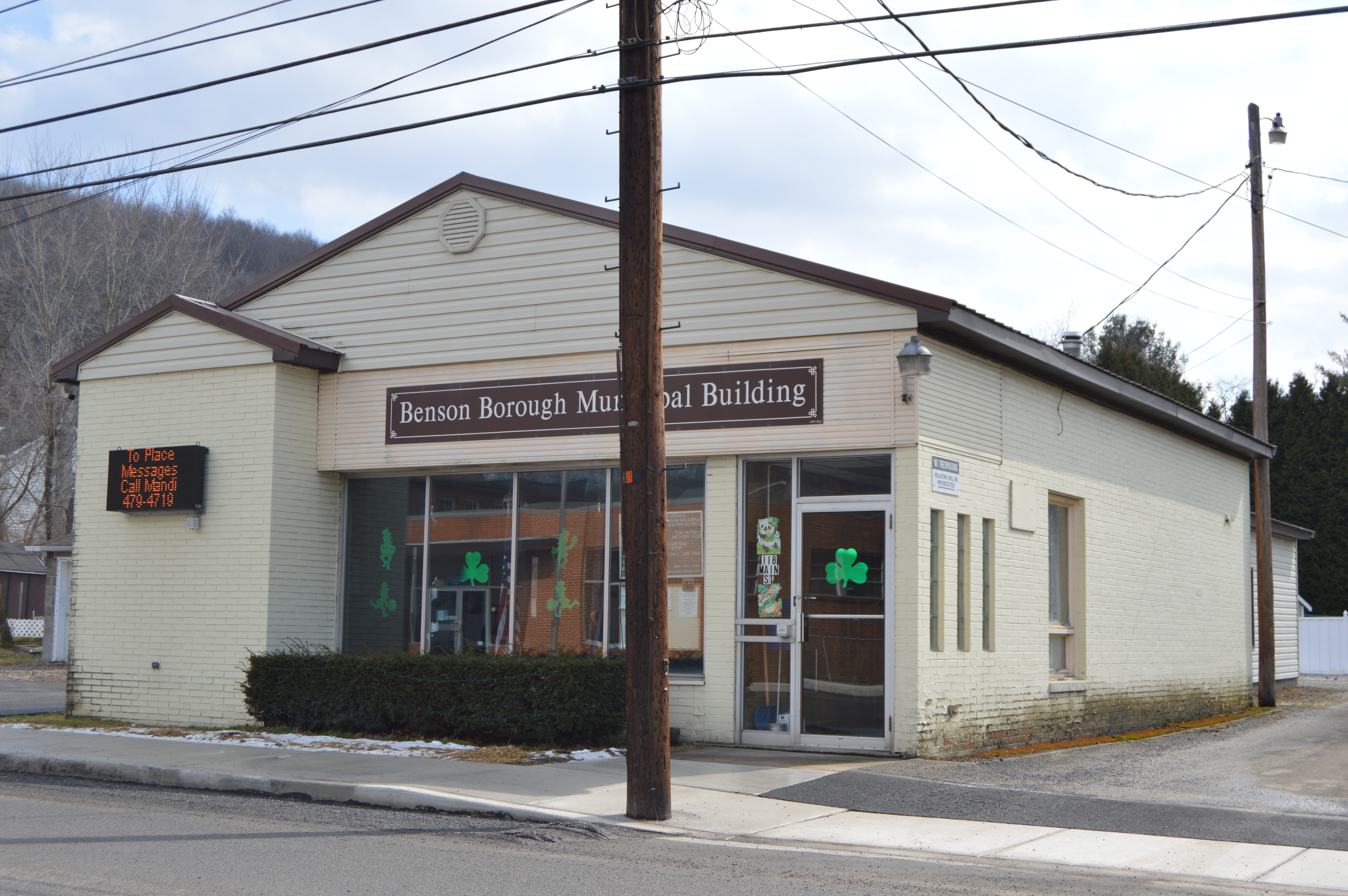
- Municipal building

- Location of Benson in Somerset County, Pennsylvania.

- Location within Pennsylvania
- Coordinates: 40°12′02″N 78°55′40″W
- Country: United States
- State: Pennsylvania
- County: Somerset
- Settled: 1880
- Incorporated: November 15, 1892

Government
  - Type: Borough
  - Mayor: Michael Burkett
  - Council President: Harold Burkett
  - Council Vice President: Tim Hutzell

Area
  - Total: 0.36 sq mi (0.92 km^{2})
  - Land: 0.36 sq mi (0.92 km^{2})
  - Water: 0 sq mi (0.00 km^{2})

Population (2020)
  - Total: 187
  - Density: 528.8/sq mi (204.16/km^{2})
- Time zone: UTC-5 (Eastern (EST))
  - Summer (DST): UTC-4 (EDT)
- Zip code: 15935
- Area code: 814
- FIPS code: 42-05648

Benson is a borough in Somerset County, Pennsylvania, United States. The town is more commonly known to locals as Hollsopple, which is also the United States Postal Service name for the town, zip code 15935. The population was 185 at the 2020 census. It is part of the Johnstown, Pennsylvania Metropolitan Statistical Area. Benson is served by the Conemaugh Township Area School District.

The community was named after one Charles Hollsopple, the original owner of the town site.

== Geography ==
Benson is located at 40°12′02″N 78°55′40″W (40.2006, -78.9279), about 34 miles southwest of Altoona and approximately 60 miles east-southeast of Pittsburgh, Pennsylvania. According to the United States Census Bureau, the borough has a total area of 0.3 square miles (0.78 km^{2}), all land. Benson sits on the east bank of the Stonycreek River.

== Demographics ==
Historical population
Census	Pop.	Note	%±
1900	249		—
1910	387		55.4%
1920	365		−5.7%
1930	451		23.6%
1940	408		−9.5%
1950	377		−7.6%
1960	350		−7.2%
1970	297		−15.1%
1980	308		3.7%
1990	277		−10.1%
2000	194		−30.0%
2010	191		−1.5%
2020	187		−2.1%
2021 (est.)	183	▼	−2.1%

As of the census of 2000, there were 194 people, 76 households, and 52 families residing in the borough. The population density was 623.1 inhabitants per square mile (240.6/km^{2}). There were 83 housing units at an average density of 266.6 per square mile (102.9/km^{2}). The racial makeup of the borough was 100.00% White.

There were 76 households, out of which 30.3% had children under the age of 18 living with them, 57.9% were married couples living together, 10.5% had a female householder with no husband present, and 30.3% were non-families. 27.6% of all households were made up of individuals, and 15.8% had someone living alone who was 65 years of age or older. The average household size was 2.55 and the average family size was 3.15.

In the borough the population was spread out, with 25.3% under the age of 18, 3.1% from 18 to 24, 27.8% from 25 to 44, 26.8% from 45 to 64, and 17.0% who were 65 years of age or older. The median age was 41 years. For every 100 females there were 108.6 males. For every 100 females age 18 and over, there were 95.9 males.

The median income for a household in the borough was $35,000, and the median income for a family was $45,000. Males had a median income of $30,208 versus $16,000 for females. The per capita income for the borough was $14,232. About 11.1% of families and 14.9% of the population were below the poverty line, including 27.3% of those under the age of eighteen and none of those 65 or over.
