= List of high schools in Pennsylvania =

This is a list of senior high schools operating in the state of Pennsylvania:

== Adams County ==
- Bermudian Springs High School, York Springs
- Biglerville High School, Biglerville
- Delone Catholic High School, McSherrystown
- Fairfield Area High School, Fairfield
- Littlestown High School, Littlestown
- New Oxford High School, New Oxford

=== Gettysburg ===
- Adams County Christian Academy
- Freedom Christian School
- Gettysburg Area High School

== Allegheny County ==
=== Eastern ===
- Cheswick Christian Academy, Cheswick
- East Allegheny Junior/Senior High School, North Versailles
- Gateway High School, Monroeville
- Penn Hills High School, Penn Hills
- Plum High School, Plum
- Riverview High School, Oakmont
- Redeemer Lutheran School, Verona
- Trinity Christian School, Forest Hills
- Western Pennsylvania School for the Deaf Edgewood

=== Northern ===
- Deer Lakes High School, Cheswick
- Eden Christian Academy, Pittsburgh, Sewickley, and Wexford
- Fox Chapel Area High School, Fox Chapel
- Hampton High School, Allison Park
- North Allegheny Intermediate High School, McCandless
- North Allegheny Senior High School, Wexford
- North Hills Senior High School Ross Township
- Shaler Area High School, Shaler Township
- Springdale Junior-Senior High School, Springdale

==== Gibsonia ====
- Aquinas Academy
- Pine-Richland High School

==== Natrona Heights ====
- Harvest Baptist Academy
- Highlands High School
- St. Joseph High School

=== Southern ===
- Baldwin High School, Baldwin
- Brentwood High School, Brentwood
- Carlynton Junior/Senior High School, Carnegie
- Chartiers Valley High School, Bridgeville
- Clairton High School, Clairton
- Elizabeth Forward High School, Elizabeth
- Mount Lebanon High School, Mount Lebanon
- South Park High School, South Park
- Steel Valley High School, Munhall
- Thomas Jefferson High School, Jefferson Hills
- Upper St. Clair High School, Upper St. Clair

==== McKeesport ====
- McKeesport Area High School
- Serra Catholic High School
- South Allegheny Middle/Senior High School

==== West Mifflin ====
- Cornerstone Christian Prep Wilson Campus
- West Mifflin Area High School
- Wilson Christian Academy

=== Western ===
- Quaker Valley High School, Leetsdale
- Sewickley Academy, Sewickley
- South Fayette Township High School, McDonald
- West Allegheny High School, Imperial

==== Coraopolis ====
- Cornell High School
- Moon Area High School
- Our Lady of the Sacred Heart High School

==== McKees Rocks ====
- Montour High School
- Robinson Township Christian School
- Sto-Rox High School

=== Pittsburgh ===
- Avonworth High School
- Bishop Canevin High School
- Brashear High School
- Carrick High School
- City Charter High School
- Imani Christian Academy
- Keystone Oaks High School
- Langley High School
- Nazareth Prep
- Northgate Junior – Senior High School
- Oakland Catholic High School
- Perry Traditional Academy
- Pittsburgh Central Catholic High School
- Pittsburgh Creative and Performing Arts 6-12
- Pittsburgh Obama 6-12
- Seton-La Salle Catholic High School
- Shady Side Academy
- South Vocational-Technology High School
- Taylor Allderdice High School
- The Ellis School
- The Neighborhood Academy
- The University School
- Three Rivers Village School
- University Preparatory School
- Urban Pathways Charter School
- Westinghouse High School
- Winchester Thurston School
- Woodland Hills High School
- Yeshiva Schools of Pittsburgh

== Armstrong County ==
- Apollo-Ridge High School, Spring Church
- Armstrong Junior/Senior High School, Kittanning
- Freeport Area High School, Freeport
- Leechburg High School, Leechburg
- Lenape Technical School, Ford City
- West Shamokin Junior/Senior High School, Rural Valley

== Beaver County ==
- Ambridge Area High School, Ambridge
- Beaver Area High School, Beaver
- Blackhawk High School, Chippewa Township
- Central Valley High School, Monaca, Center Township
- Freedom Area High School, Freedom
- Lincoln Park Performing Arts Charter School, Midland
- New Brighton Area High School, New Brighton
- Quigley Catholic High School, Baden
- Riverside High School, Ellwood City
- Rochester Area High School, Rochester
- South Side High School, Hookstown
- Western Beaver Junior/Senior High School, Industry

=== Aliquippa ===
- Aliquippa High School
- Hopewell High School

=== Beaver Falls ===
- Beaver County Christian High School
- Beaver Falls High School

== Bedford County ==
- Bedford High School, Bedford
- Chestnut Ridge Senior High School, New Paris
- Everett Area Junior/Senior High School, Everett
- HOPE for Hyndman Charter School, Hyndman
- Northern Bedford County Middle/High School, Loysburg
- Tussey Mountain Junior/Senior High School, Saxton

== Berks County ==
=== Central ===
- Governor Mifflin Senior High School, Shillington
- Muhlenberg High School, Laureldale
- Schuylkill Valley High School, Leesport
- Wilson Senior High School, West Lawn
- Wyomissing Area Junior/Senior High School, Wyomissing

=== Eastern ===
- Boyertown Area High School, Boyertown
- Exeter Township Senior High School, Exeter Township
- Oley Valley High School, Oley Township
- Pine Forge Academy, Pine Forge

=== Northern ===
- Brandywine Heights High School, Topton
- Fleetwood Area High School, Fleetwood
- Kutztown Area High School, Kutztown
- The King's Academy, Mohrsville

==== Hamburg ====
- Blue Mountain Academy
- Hamburg Area High School

=== Southern ===
- Conestoga Christian School, Morgantown
- Twin Valley High School, Elverson

==== Birdsboro ====
- Berks Christian School
- Daniel Boone Area High School

==== Reading ====
- Antietam Middle/High School
- Berks Catholic High School
- Reading Senior High School

=== Western ===
- Conrad Weiser High School, Robesonia
- Tulpehocken Junior/Senior High School, Bernville

== Blair County ==
- Bellwood-Antis High School, Bellwood
- Central High School, Martinsburg
- Claysburg-Kimmel High School, Claysburg
- Hollidaysburg Area High School, Hollidaysburg
- Williamsburg Community Junior/Senior High School, Williamsburg

=== Altoona ===
- Altoona Area High School
- Bishop Guilfoyle High School

=== Tyrone ===
- Greater Altoona Career and Technology Center
- The Grier School
- Tyrone Area High School

== Bradford County ==
- Athens Area High School, Athens Township
- Canton Junior Senior High School, Canton
- Sayre Area High School, Sayre
- Towanda Area High School, Towanda
- Troy Area High School, Troy
- Wyalusing Valley Junior-Senior High School, Wyalusing

=== Rome ===
- Northeast Bradford Junior/Senior High School
- North Rome Christian School

== Bucks County ==
=== Central ===
- Central Bucks High School East, Buckingham
- Central Bucks High School South, Warrington
- Central Bucks High School West, Doylestown
- Middle Bucks Institute of Technology, Jamison

==== New Hope ====
- New Hope-Solebury High School
- Solebury School

==== Newtown ====
- Council Rock High School North
- George School

==== Warminster ====
- Archbishop Wood Catholic High School
- William Tennent High School

=== Eastern ===
- Bristol High School, Bristol
- Council Rock High School South, Holland
- Harry S. Truman High School, Levittown
- Morrisville Middle/Senior High School, Morrisville
- Neshaminy High School, Langhorne
- Villa Joseph Marie High School, Southampton

==== Bensalem ====
- Bensalem High School
- Holy Ghost Preparatory School
- School Lane Charter School

==== Fairless Hills ====
- Bucks County Technical High School
- Conwell–Egan Catholic High School
- Pennsbury High School

=== Northern ===
- Palisades High School, Kintnersville
- Plumstead Christian School, Plumsteadville
- Upper Bucks Christian School, Sellersville

==== Perkasie ====
- Pennridge High School
- Upper Bucks County Technical School

==== Quakertown ====
- Faith Christian Academy
- Quakertown Christian School
- Quakertown Community High School

== Butler County ==
- Karns City High School, Karns City
- Knoch High School, Saxonburg
- Mars Area High School, Mars
- Moniteau Junior/Senior High School, West Sunbury
- North Catholic High School Cranberry Township
- Seneca Valley High School, Harmony
- Slippery Rock Area High School, Slippery Rock
- Summit Academy, Herman

=== Butler ===
- Butler High School
- Butler County Area Vo-Tech School
- First Baptist Christian School

== Cambria County ==
- Blacklick Valley Junior Senior High School, Nanty-Glo
- Cambria Heights High School, Patton
- Forest Hills High School, Sidman
- Glendale Junior/Senior High School, Flinton
- Northern Cambria High School, Northern Cambria
- Penn Cambria High School, Cresson
- Portage Area High School, Portage

=== Ebensburg ===
- Admiral Peary Vocational-Technical School
- Bishop Carroll High School
- Central Cambria High School

=== Johnstown ===
- Bishop McCort High School
- Conemaugh Valley Junior/Senior High School
- Ferndale Area Junior/Senior High School
- Greater Johnstown High School
- Greater Johnstown Vo-Tech School
- Richland Senior High School
- Westmont Hilltop High School

== Cameron County ==
- Cameron County High School, Emporium

== Carbon County ==
- Lehighton Area High School, Lehighton
- Palmerton Area High School, Palmerton
- Panther Valley High School, Lansford
- Weatherly Area High School, Weatherly

=== Jim Thorpe ===
- Carbon Career and Technical Institute
- Jim Thorpe Area High School

== Centre County ==
- Bald Eagle Area High School
- Penns Valley Area High School, Spring Mills
- Philipsburg-Osceola Area High School, Philipsburg
- Saint Joseph's Catholic Academy, Boalsburg

=== Bellefonte ===
- Bellefonte Area High School

=== State College ===
- Grace Prep High School
- State College Area High School

== Chester County ==
- Coatesville Area High School, Coatesville
- Conestoga High School, Berwyn
- Devon Preparatory School, Devon
- Octorara High School, Atglen
- Owen J. Roberts High School, Bucktown
- Oxford Area High School, Oxford
- Twin Valley High School, Elverson
- West Chester East High School, West Goshen Twp
- West Chester Technical High School, West Chester
- Woodlynde School, Strafford

=== Downingtown ===
- Bishop Shanahan High School
- Downingtown STEM Academy
- Downingtown West High School
- Technical College High School Brandywine

=== Exton ===
- Collegium Charter School
- Downingtown East High School

=== Kennett Square ===
- Kennett High School
- Unionville High School

=== Malvern ===
- Great Valley High School
- Malvern Preparatory School
- The Phelps School
- Villa Maria Academy

=== Paoli ===
- Church Farm School
- Delaware Valley Friends School

=== Phoenixville ===
- Kimberton Waldorf School
- Phoenixville Area High School
- Renaissance Academy Charter School
- Technical College High School Pickering

=== West Chester ===
- Henderson High School
- West Chester Christian School

=== West Grove ===
- Avon Grove Charter School
- Avon Grove High School
- Technical College High School Pennock's Bridge

=== Westtown Twp ===
- West Chester Rustin High School
- Westtown School

== Clarion County ==
- Allegheny-Clarion Valley Junior/Senior High School, Foxburg
- Clarion Area High School, Clarion
- Clarion-Limestone Area Junior/Senior High School, Strattanville
- Keystone Junior/Senior High School, Knox
- North Clarion County Junior/Senior High School, Tionesta
- Redbank Valley Junior/Senior High School, New Bethlehem
- Union Junior/Senior High School, Rimersburg

== Clearfield County ==
- Curwensville Area Junior/Senior High School, Curwensville
- Harmony Area High School, Westover
- Moshannon Valley Junior/Senior High School, Houtzdale
- West Branch Area Junior/Senior High School, Morrisdale

=== Clearfield ===
- Clearfield Alliance Christian School
- Clearfield Area Junior/Senior High School

=== DuBois ===
- Central Catholic High School
- DuBois Area Senior High School

== Clinton County ==
- Bucktail High School, Renovo
- Central Mountain High School, Mill Hall
- Sugar Valley Rural Charter School, Loganton
- Walnut Street Christian School, Avis

== Columbia County ==
- Benton Area High School, Benton
- Berwick Area Senior High School, Berwick
- Millville Area Junior Senior High School, Millville
- Southern Columbia Area High School, Catawissa

=== Bloomsburg ===
- Bloomsburg High School
- Central Columbia High School
- Columbia County Christian School
- Columbia-Montour Area Vocational-Technical School

== Crawford County ==
- Cambridge Springs Junior/Senior High School, Cambridge Springs
- Cochranton Junior/Senior High School, Cochranton
- Conneaut Area Senior High School, Linesville
- Maplewood Junior/Senior High School, Guys Mills
- Saegertown Junior/Senior High School, Saegertown
- Titusville Area High School, Titusville

=== Meadville ===
- Crawford Christian Academy
- Crawford County Career and Technical Center
- Meadville Area Senior High School

== Cumberland County ==
- Big Spring High School, Newville
- Boiling Springs High School, Boiling Springs
- East Pennsboro Area High School, Enola
- Harrisburg Academy, Wormleysburg
- Shippensburg Area High School, Shippensburg
- West Shore Christian Academy, Shiremanstown

=== Camp Hill ===
- Camp Hill High School
- Cedar Cliff High School
- Trinity High School

=== Carlisle ===
- Carlisle Christian Academy
- Carlisle High School

=== Mechanicsburg ===
- Cumberland Valley High School
- Cumberland-Perry Area Career & Technical Center
- Mechanicsburg Area High School

== Dauphin County ==
- Halifax Area High School, Halifax
- Harrisburg Christian School, Linglestown
- Lower Dauphin High School, Hummelstown
- Middletown Area High School, Middletown
- Steelton-Highspire High School, Steelton
- Upper Dauphin Area High School, Elizabethville

=== Harrisburg ===
- Bishop McDevitt High School
- Capital Area School for the Arts
- Central Dauphin East High School
- Central Dauphin High School
- Covenant Christian Academy
- Dauphin County Technical School
- Harrisburg High School
- SciTech High
- Susquehanna Township High School
- The Circle School

=== Hershey ===
- Hershey High School
- Milton Hershey School

=== Millersburg ===
- Millersburg Area High School
- Northern Dauphin Christian School

== Delaware County ==
=== Eastern ===
- Academy Park High School, Sharon Hill
- Academy of Notre Dame de Namur, Villanova
- Delaware County Technical High School, Folcroft
- The Haverford School, Haverford
- Haverford Senior High School, Havertown
- Interboro High School, Prospect Park
- Penn Wood High School, Lansdowne
- Ridley High School, Ridley Twp
- Valley Forge Military Academy and College, Wayne

==== Drexel Hill ====
- Bonner & Prendergast Catholic High School
- Upper Darby High School

==== Newtown Square ====
- Delaware County Christian School
- Episcopal Academy
- Marple Newtown High School

==== Radnor ====
- Archbishop Carroll High School
- Hill Top Preparatory School
- Radnor High School

==== Rosemont ====
- Agnes Irwin School
- Hill Top Preparatory School

==== Springfield ====
- Cardinal O'Hara High School
- Springfield High School

=== Western ===
- Chichester High School, Boothwyn
- Garnet Valley High School, Concord Twp
- Penncrest High School, Media
- Strath Haven High School, Wallingford
- The Christian Academy, Brookhaven

==== Aston ====
- Delaware County Technical High School
- Sun Valley High School

==== Chester ====
- Chester Charter Scholars Academy
- Chester High School
- Stem Academy at Showalter

== Elk County ==
- Johnsonburg Area High School, Johnsonburg
- Ridgway Area High School, Ridgway

=== St. Marys ===
- Elk County Catholic High School
- St. Mary's Area High School

== Erie County ==
- Corry Area Middle/High School, Corry
- Fairview High School, Fairview
- Fort Leboeuf High School, Waterford
- General McLane High School, Edinboro
- Girard High School, Girard
- Harbor Creek Junior/Senior High School, Harborcreek
- Iroquois Junior/Senior High School, Lawrence Park Township, Wesleyville
- North East High School, North East
- Northwestern High School, Albion
- Union City High School, Union City

=== Erie ===
- Bethel Christian School
- Cathedral Preparatory School/Villa Maria Academy
- Central Tech High School
- Charter School of Excellence
- Erie High School
- Erie County Technical School
- Erie First Christian Academy
- McDowell High School
- Mercyhurst Preparatory School
- Northwest Pennsylvania Collegiate Academy
- R.B. Wiley Community Charter School
- Seneca High School

== Fayette County ==
- Brownsville Area High School, Brownsville
- Frazier High School, Perryopolis
- Mt. Carmel Christian School, Mount Pleasant

=== Connellsville ===
- Connellsville Area Career and Technology Center
- Connellsville Area Senior High School
- Geibel Catholic High School

=== Uniontown ===
- Albert Gallatin High School
- Chestnut Ridge Christian Academy
- Fayette County Career and Technical Institute
- Laurel Highlands High School
- St. John the Evangelist Regional Catholic School
- Uniontown Area High School

== Forest County ==
- East Forest High School, Marienville
- West Forest Junior/Senior High School, Tionesta

== Franklin County ==
- Fannett-Metal High School, Willow Hill
- Greencastle-Antrim High School, Greencastle
- Waynesboro Area Senior High School, Waynesboro

=== Chambersburg ===
- CMS Chambersburg Area Career Magnet School
- Chambersburg Area Senior High School
- Cumberland Valley Christian School
- Franklin County Career and Technology Center
- Shalom Christian Academy

=== Mercersburg ===
- James Buchanan High School
- Mercersburg Academy

== Fulton County ==
- Forbes Road Junior/Senior High School, Waterfall
- Southern Fulton Junior/Senior High School, Warfordsburg

=== McConnellsburg ===
- Fulton County Center for Career and Technology
- McConnellsburg High School

== Greene County ==
- Carmichaels Area Junior/Senior High School, Carmichaels
- Jefferson-Morgan Middle/High School, Jefferson
- Mapletown Junior/Senior High School, Greensboro

=== Waynesburg ===
- Greene County Career and Technology Center - Franklin Township
- Waynesburg Central High School
- West Greene High School

== Huntingdon County ==
- Huntingdon County Career & Technical Center, Mill Creek
- Juniata Valley Junior/Senior High School, Alexandria
- Mount Union Area Senior High School, Mount Union
- Southern Huntingdon County Middle/High School, Three Springs

=== Huntingdon ===
- Calvary Christian Academy
- Huntingdon Area Senior High School
- New Day Charter School

== Indiana County ==
- Blairsville Middle-High School, Blairsville
- Homer-Center Junior/Senior High School, Homer City
- Marion Center Area High School, Marion Center
- Penns Manor Area Junior/Senior High School, Clymer
- Purchase Line Junior/Senior High School, Commodore
- Saltsburg Junior/Senior High School, Saltsburg
- Seeds of Faith Christian Academy, Creekside
- United Junior/Senior High School, Armagh

=== Indiana ===
- Indiana Area High School
- Indiana County Technology Center

== Jefferson County ==
- Brockway Area Junior/Senior High School, Brockway
- Brookville Area Jr./Sr. High School, Brookville
- Christ's Dominion Academy, Summerville
- Jefferson County Vocational School, Reynoldsville
- Punxsutawney Area High School, Punxsutawney

== Juniata County ==
- Juniata High School, Mifflintown

=== McAlisterville ===
- East Juniata Junior/Senior High School
- Juniata Christian School

== Lackawanna County ==
- Abington Heights High School, Clarks Summit
- Carbondale Area Junior Senior High School, Carbondale
- Lakeland Junior-Senior High School, Jermyn
- Mid Valley Secondary Center, Throop
- Old Forge Junior/Senior High School, Old Forge
- Riverside Junior/Senior High School, Taylor
- Summit Christian Academy, South Abington Township
- Valley View High School, Archbald

=== Dunmore ===
- Dunmore High School
- Holy Cross High School

=== Moscow ===
- North Pocono High School
- St. Gregory's Academy

=== Scranton ===
- Career Technology Center of Lackawanna County
- Holy Cross High School
- Scranton High School
- Scranton Preparatory School
- West Scranton High School

== Lancaster County ==
=== Eastern ===
- Garden Spot High School, New Holland
- Manheim Central High School, Manheim
- Manheim Township High School, Manheim Twp
- Terre Hill Mennonite High School, Terre Hill
- Veritas Academy, Leola

==== Kinzers ====
- Faith Mennonite High School
- Pequea Valley High School

=== Northern ===
- Cocalico Senior High School, Denver
- Lancaster County Career & Technical Center, Brownstown

==== Ephrata ====
- Ephrata Senior High School
- Ephrata Mennonite School

==== Lititz ====
- Linden Hall School
- Lititz Area Mennonite School (LAMS)
- Lititz Christian School
- Warwick High School

=== Southern ===
- Lampeter-Strasburg High School, Lampeter
- Lancaster County Career & Technical Center, Willow Street
- Penn Manor High School, Millersville
- Solanco High School, Quarryville

=== Western ===
- Columbia Junior/Senior High School, Columbia
- Dayspring Christian Academy, Mountville
- Hempfield High School, Landisville

==== Elizabethtown ====
- Elizabethtown Area High School
- Mt. Calvary Christian School

==== Mount Joy ====
- Donegal High School
- The Janus School

=== Lancaster ===
- Conestoga Valley High School
- J. P. McCaskey High School
- La Academia Partnership Charter School
- Lancaster Catholic High School
- Lancaster Country Day School
- Lancaster Mennonite School
- Phoenix Academy

== Lawrence County ==
- Lincoln High School, Ellwood City
- Mohawk High School, Bessemer
- Shenango High School, Shenango Twp
- Wilmington Area High School, New Wilmington

=== New Castle ===
- Laurel Junior/Senior High School
- Lawrence County Career & Technical Center
- Neshannock Township Junior/Senior High School
- New Castle Junior/Senior High School
- Union Area High School

== Lebanon County ==
- Annville-Cleona Junior/Senior High School, Annville
- Eastern Lebanon County High School, Myerstown
- Northern Lebanon High School, Fredericksburg
- Palmyra Area High School, Palmyra

=== Lebanon ===
- Cedar Crest High School
- Lebanon Catholic High School
- Lebanon County Career & Technology Center
- Lebanon High School
- New Covenant Christian School

== Lehigh County ==
- Emmaus High School, Emmaus
- Lehigh Career and Technical Institute, Schnencksville
- Northern Lehigh High School, Slatington
- Northwestern Lehigh High School, Tripoli
- Parkland High School, South Whitehall Township
- Salem Christian School, Macungie
- Salisbury High School, Salisbury Twp
- Southern Lehigh High School, Center Valley
- Whitehall High School, Whitehall

=== Allentown ===
- Allentown Central Catholic High School
- Building 21 Allentown
- Executive Education Academy Charter School
- Lincoln Leadership Academy Charter School
- Louis E. Dieruff High School
- Roberto Clemente Charter School
- William Allen High School

== Luzerne County ==
=== Central ===
- Greater Nanticoke Area High School, Nanticoke
- Northwest Area High School, Shickshinny

=== Eastern ===
- Crestwood High School, Mountain Top
- Hanover Area Junior/Senior High School, Hanover Twp
- Hazleton Area Career Center, Hazle Twp
- Hazleton Area High School, Hazleton
- Holy Redeemer High School, Wilkes-Barre
- MMI Preparatory School, Freeland
- Wyoming Valley West High School, Plymouth

=== Northern ===
- Dallas High School, Dallas
- Lake-Lehman Junior/Senior High School, Lehman
- Pittston Area High School, Pittston
- West Side Career & Technology Center, Pringle
- Wyoming Area Secondary Center, Exeter
- Wyoming Seminary Upper School, Kingston

==== Plains ====
- Wilkes-Barre Area High School
- Wilkes-Barre Area Career & Technical Center

== Lycoming County ==
- Jersey Shore Area High School, Jersey Shore
- Loyalsock Township High School, Loyalsock Twp
- Montgomery Area High School, Montgomery
- Montoursville Area High School, Montoursville
- Muncy Junior-Senior High School, Muncy
- South Williamsport Area Junior Senior High School, South Williamsport

=== Hughesville ===
- Hughesville Junior Senior High School
- Lycoming Career and Technology Center

=== Williamsport ===
- St. John Neumann Regional Academy High School
- Williamsport Area High School

== McKean County ==
- Bradford Area High School, Bradford
- Kane Area High School, Kane
- Otto-Eldred High School, Duke Center
- Smethport Area High School, Smethport

=== Port Allegany ===
- Port Allegany High School
- Seneca Highlands Career & Technical Center

== Mercer County ==
- Commodore Perry High School, Hadley
- Farrell Area High School, Farrell
- Grove City Area High School, Grove City
- Jamestown Area Junior/Senior High School, Jamestown
- Lakeview High School, Stoneboro
- Sharon High School, Sharon
- Sharpsville Area High School, Sharpsville
- West Middlesex High School, West Middlesex

=== Greenville ===
- Greenville High School
- Keystone Charter School
- Reynolds High School

=== Hermitage ===
- Hickory High School
- Kennedy Catholic High School

=== Mercer ===
- Mercer Area Junior/Senior High School
- Mercer County Career & Technical Center

== Mifflin County ==
- Mifflin County High School

== Monroe County ==
- Evergreen Community Charter School, Cresco
- Pleasant Valley High School, Brodheadsville
- Monroe Career & Technical Institute, Bartonsville
- Pocono Mountain East High School, Swiftwater
- Pocono Mountain West High School, Pocono Summit
- Stroudsburg High School, Stroudsburg

=== East Stroudsburg ===
- East Stroudsburg High School South
- Notre Dame High School

== Montgomery County ==
=== Eastern ===
- Abington Senior High School, Abington Twp
- Academy of the New Church, Bryn Athyn
- Cheltenham High School, Wyncote
- Hatboro-Horsham High School, Horsham
- La Salle College High School, Wyndmoor
- Mount Saint Joseph Academy, Flourtown

==== Erdenheim ====
- Philadelphia-Montgomery Christian Academy
- Springfield Township High School

==== Fort Washington ====
- Germantown Academy
- Upper Dublin High School

==== Huntingdon Valley ====
- Lower Moreland High School

==== Jenkintown ====
- Abington Friends School
- Jenkintown High School

==== Willow Grove ====
- Eastern Center for Arts & Technology
- Upper Moreland High School

=== Northern ===
- Gwynedd Mercy Academy, Gwynedd Valley
- Souderton Area High School, Souderton
- Wissahickon High School, Ambler

==== Lansdale ====
- Calvary Baptist School
- Lansdale Catholic High School
- Dock Mennonite Academy
- North Montco Technical Career Center
- North Penn High School

==== Pennsburg ====
- The Perkiomen School
- Upper Perkiomen High School

=== Southern ===
- AIM Academy, Conshohocken
- Friends' Central School, Wynnewood
- Harriton High School, Rosemont
- Kosloff Torah Academy, Bala Cynwyd
- Lower Merion High School, Ardmore
- Merion Mercy Academy, Merion
- Upper Merion Area High School, King of Prussia

==== Bryn Mawr ====
- Barrack Hebrew Academy
- The Baldwin School
- The Shipley School

==== Norristown ====
- Norristown Area High School
- Roosevelt Alternative High School

==== Plymouth Meeting ====
- Central Montco Technical High School
- Plymouth-Whitemarsh High School

=== Western ===
- Methacton High School, Eagleville
- Pottsgrove High School, Pottsgrove

==== Collegeville ====
- Perkiomen Valley High School
- Valley Forge Baptist Academy

==== Pottstown ====
- Coventry Christian Schools
- Pottstown High School
- The Hill School
- Alliance Christian School

==== Royersford ====
- Pope John Pope II High School
- Spring-Ford High School
- Western Montgomery Career & Technology Center

== Montour County ==
- Danville High School, Danville

== Northampton County ==
- Bangor Area High School, Bangor
- Nazareth Area High School, Nazareth
- Pen Argyl Area High School, Penn Argyl
- Saucon Valley High School, Hellertown

=== Bethlehem ===
- Bethlehem Area Vocational-Technical School
- Bethlehem Catholic High School
- Freedom High School
- Lehigh Valley Academy Regional Charter School
- Lehigh Valley Charter High School for the Arts
- Liberty High School
- Moravian Academy

=== Easton ===
- Career Institute of Technology
- Easton Area High School
- Notre Dame High School
- Wilson Area High School

=== Northampton ===
- Catasauqua High School
- Northampton Area High School

== Northumberland County ==
- Line Mountain Jr./Sr. High School, Herndon
- Mount Carmel Area High School, Mount Carmel
- Northumberland Christian School, Northumberland
- Shikellamy High School, Sunbury
- Warrior Run High School, Turbotville

=== Coal Township ===
- Northumberland County Career Technology Center
- Our Lady of Lourdes Regional School
- Shamokin Area High School

=== Milton ===
- Meadowbrook Christian School
- Milton Area High School

== Perry County ==
- Greenwood High School, Millerstown
- Newport High School, Newport
- Susquenita High School, Duncannon
- West Perry High School, Elliottsburg

== Philadelphia County (City of Philadelphia) ==
=== Neighborhood ===
- John Bartram High School
- Edison/Fareira High School
- Samuel Fels High School
- Frankford High School
- Benjamin Franklin High School
- Horace Furness High School
- Kensington High School
- Martin Luther King High School
- Abraham Lincoln High School
- Northeast High School
- Overbrook High School
- Penn Treaty School (6-12)
- Roxborough High School
- William L. Sayre High School
- South Philadelphia High School
- Strawberry Mansion High School
- George Washington High School
- West Philadelphia High School

=== Special Admissions ===
- Academy at Palumbo
- The Arts Academy at Benjamin Rush
- Bodine International Affairs
- CAPA
- Carver High School for Engineering and Science
- Central High School
- GAMP
- Franklin Learning Center
- Hill-Freedman World Academy High School
- Julia R. Masterman School
- Kensington Creative & Performing Arts High School
- Kensington Health Sciences Academy High School
- Parkway Center City High School
- Parkway Northwest High School
- Parkway West High School
- Philadelphia High School for Girls
- Philadelphia Learning Academy
- Philadelphia Military Academy
- Philadelphia Virtual Academy
- Science Leadership Academy
- Science Leadership Academy at Beeber (6-12)
- The LINC
- Walter Biddle Saul High School for Agricultural Sciences

=== Magnet/Citywide Admission ===
- Building 21
- Constitution High School
- Murrell Dobbins Vocational School
- High School of the Future
- Lankenau High School
- Jules E. Mastbaum Technical High School
- Microsoft's School of the Future
- Motivation High School
- Paul Robeson High School for Human Services
- Randolph Technical High School
- The U School
- The Workshop School
- Swenson Arts and Technology High School
- Vaux Big Picture High School

=== Charter ===
- Belmont Charter High School
- Boys' Latin of Philadelphia Charter School
- Community Academy of Philadelphia
- Electric & Technology Charter High School
- Esperanza Academy Charter School
- First Philadelphia Preparatory Charter School
- Franklin Towne Charter School
- Freire Charter School
- Imhotep Institute Charter High School
- KIPP Charter Schools
- Olney High School
- Mariana Bracetti Academy Charter School
- Maritime Academy Charter School
- Mastery Charter Schools (Gratz, Lenfest, Pickett, Shoemaker, Thomas, Hardy Williams)
- MaST Charter Schools (Community, II, III)
- Mathematics, Civics and Sciences Charter School
- Multicultural Academy Charter School
- New Foundations Charter School
- Philadelphia Academy Charter School
- Philadelphia Performing Arts Charter School
- Preparatory Charter School of Mathematics, Science, Technology & Careers
- Sankofa Freedom Academy Charter School
- Southwest Leadership Academy Charter School
- Tacony Academy Charter School
- TECH Freire Charter School
- Universal Audenried Charter High School

=== Private ===
- Friends Select School
- Germantown Friends School
- Philadelphia Free School
- Springside Chestnut Hill Academy
- The Crefeld School
- The Mill Creek School
- William Penn Charter School

=== Religious ===
- Archbishop Ryan High School
- Cristo Rey Philadelphia High School
- Father Judge High School
- Hope Church School
- International Christian High School
- Little Flower Catholic High School for Girls
- Mercy Vocational High School
- Nazareth Academy High School
- Northeast Catholic High School
- Roman Catholic High School for Boys
- St. Hubert Catholic High School for Girls
- Saint Joseph's Preparatory School
- Saints John Neumann and Maria Goretti Catholic High School
- Talmudical Yeshiva of Philadelphia
- The City School
- West Philadelphia Catholic High School

== Pike County ==
- Delaware Valley High School, Milford
- East Stroudsburg High School North, Dingmans Ferry

== Potter County ==
- Austin High School, Austin
- Coudersport Area Junior/Senior High School, Coudersport
- Galeton Area High School, Galeton
- Northern Potter Junior Senior High School, Ulysses
- Oswayo Valley High School, Shinglehouse

== Schuylkill County ==
=== Northern/Eastern ===
- Mahanoy Area High School, Mahanoy City
- North Schuylkill High School, Fountain Springs
- Schuylkill Technology Center, Frackville
- Shenandoah Valley High School, Shenandoah

==== Tamaqua ====
- Marian Catholic High School
- Tamaqua Area High School

=== Southern/Western ===
- Minersville Area High School, Minersville
- Pine Grove Area High School, Pine Grove
- Tri-Valley High School, Hegins
- Williams Valley High School, Tower City

==== Pottsville ====
- Gillingham Charter School
- Nativity BVM High School
- Pottsville Area High School

==== Schuylkill Haven ====
- Blue Mountain High School
- Schuylkill Haven High School

== Snyder County ==
- Midd-West High School, Middleburg
- Penn View Bible Institute, Penns Creek
- Selinsgrove Area High School, Selinsgrove

== Somerset County ==
=== Central ===
- Berlin Brothersvalley High School, Berlin
- Rockwood Area Junior/Senior High School, Rockwood
- Shanksville-Stonycreek High School, Shanksville
- Somerset County Technology Center, Somerset Twp
- Somerset Area High School, Somerset

=== Northern ===
- Conemaugh Township Area Middle/Senior High School, Davidsville
- Johnstown Christian School, Benson
- North Star High School, Boswell
- Shade Junior/Senior High School, Cairnbrook
- Windber Area High School, Windber

=== Southern ===
- Meyersdale Area High School, Meyersdale
- Salisbury-Elk Lick Junior/Senior High School, Salisbury
- Turkeyfoot Valley Area Junior/Senior High School, Confluence

== Sullivan County ==
- Sullivan County Junior/Senior High School, Laporte

== Susquehanna County ==
- Blue Ridge High School, New Milford
- Elk Lake High School, Dimock
- Forest City Regional High School, Forest City
- Montrose Area Junior Senior High School, Montrose
- Mountain View High School, Kingsley
- Susquehanna Community High School, Susquehanna
- Susquehanna County Career & Technology Center, Springville

== Tioga County ==
- Cowanesque Valley Junior Senior High School, Westfield
- North Penn-Liberty High School, Liberty
- Wellsboro Area High School, Wellsboro
- Williamson Senior High School, Tioga

=== Mansfield ===
- Mansfield High School]
- New Covenant Academy

== Union County ==
- Lewisburg Area High School, Lewisburg
- Mifflinburg Area High School, Mifflinburg
- SUN Area Technical Institute, New Berlin

== Venango County ==
=== Franklin ===
- Franklin Area High School
- Rocky Grove High School

=== Oil City ===
- Oil City High School
- Venango Catholic High School
- Venango Technology Center

=== Seneca ===
- Christian Life Academy
- Cranberry Area High School

== Warren County ==
- Eisenhower Middle/High School, Russell
- Sheffield Area Middle/High School, Sheffield
- Warren Area High School, Warren
- Youngsville High School, Youngsville

== Washington County ==
=== Eastern ===
- California Area High School, Coal Center
- Calvary Chapel Christian School, Brownsville
- Ringgold High School, Monongahela

==== Charleroi ====
- Charleroi High School
- Mon Valley Career & Technology Center

=== Northern ===
- Burgettstown Junior/Senior High School, Burgettstown
- Fort Cherry Jr/Sr High School, McDonald
- Chartiers Houston High School, Houston
- Peters Township High School, Peters Twp

==== Canonsburg ====
- Canon-McMillan High School
- Western Area Career & Technology Center

=== Southern ===
- Bentworth High School, Bentleyville
- Bethlehem-Center High School, Fredericktown

==== Washington ====
- Faith Christian School
- Trinity High School
- Washington High School

=== Western ===
- Avella Area Junior/Senior High School, Avella
- McGuffey High School, Claysville

== Wayne County ==
- Honesdale High School, Honesdale
- Wallenpaupack Area High School, Hawley

=== Lake Ariel ===
- Canaan Christian Academy
- Western Wayne High School

== Westmoreland County ==
=== Central ===
- Central Westmoreland Career and Technology Center, New Stanton
- Hempfield Area High School, Hempfield Twp
- Jeannette High School, Jeannette

==== Greensburg ====
- Greensburg Central Catholic High School
- Greensburg-Salem High School
- Westmoreland Christian Academy

==== Latrobe ====
- Dr. Robert Ketterer Charter School
- Eastern Westmoreland Career & Technology Center
- Greater Latrobe Senior High School

=== Eastern ===
- Champion Christian School, Champion & Donegal
- Derry Area High School, Derry
- Grace Bible Academy, Bradenville
- Ligonier Valley High School, Ligonier

==== Mount Pleasant ====
- Mount Carmel Christian School
- Mount Pleasant Area Junior/Senior High School

=== Northern ===
- Burrell High School, Lower Burrell
- Franklin Regional High School, Murrysville
- Kiski Area High School, Vandergrift
- The Kiski School, Saltsburg

==== New Kensington ====
- Northern Westmoreland Career and Technology Center
- Valley Junior/Senior High School

=== Western ===
- Armbrust Christian Academy, Hunker
- Belle Vernon Area High School, Belle Vernon
- Monessen High School, Monessen
- Norwin High School, North Huntingdon
- Southmoreland High School, Alverton
- Yough Senior High School, Herminie

== Wyoming County ==
- Lackawanna Trail High School, Factoryville
- Tunkhannock Area High School, Tunkhannock

== York County ==
- Dallastown Area High School, Dallastown
- Dover Area High School, Dover
- Eastern York High School, Wrightsville
- Kennard-Dale High School, Fawn Grove
- Northeastern High School, Manchester
- Northern High School, Dillsburg
- Red Land High School, Lewisberry
- Spring Grove Area High School, Spring Grove
- Susquehannock High School, Glen Rock

=== Hanover ===
- Hanover High School
- Hope Christian School
- South Western Senior High School

=== Red Lion ===
- Red Lion Area High School
- Red Lion Christian School

=== York ===
- Bible Baptist Christian Academy
- Central York High School
- Christian School of York
- Crispus Attucks Charter School
- Logos Academy
- West York Area High School
- William Penn Senior High School
- York Catholic High School
- York Country Day School
- York County School of Technology
- York Suburban Senior High School

== See also ==
- List of school districts in Pennsylvania
