= Ed Koontz =

American football player (born 1946)

No. 54, 55
- Position: Linebacker

Personal information
- Born: June 11, 1946 (age 80); Hanover, Pennsylvania, U.S.
- Listed height: 6 ft 2 in (1.88 m)
- Listed weight: 230 lb (104 kg)

Career information
- High school: Littlestown (Littlestown, Pennsylvania)
- College: Catawba
- AFL draft: 1968: 17th round, 440th overall pick

Career history
- Boston Patriots (1968); Quincy Giants (1969)
- Stats at Pro Football Reference

Edward Larry Koontz (born June 11, 1946) is an American former professional football linebacker who played one season with the Boston Patriots of the American Football League (AFL). He played college football at Catawba and was selected by the Patriots in the 17th round of the 1968 NFL/AFL draft.

== Early life ==
Edward Larry Koontz was born on June 11, 1946, in Hanover, Pennsylvania. He played four years of varsity football at Littlestown High School in Littlestown, Pennsylvania. He was a fullback and defensive back in high school. He earned All-Laurel Conference honors as a fullback and was also named the York County Interscholastic League defensive back of the year. Koontz garnered all-state recognition in high school as well. He graduated in 1964.

== College career ==
Koontz played college football for the Catawba Indians from 1964 to 1967 as a two-way player. He was a linebacker on defense but spent time at several positions on offense; he was an offensive guard his freshman year in 1964, then a tight end for two years, before switching to center as a senior. He was a team captain his senior year in 1967. Koontz led the Carolinas Intercollegiate Athletic Conference (CIAC) in tackles for three straight seasons. He was named All-CIAC as a center in 1965 and as a linebacker in both 1966 and 1967. He earned second-team Little All-American honors in 1967. Koontz majored in business at Catawba. He was inducted into the Catawba Hall of Fame in 1983.

== Professional career ==
Koontz was selected by the Boston Patriots in the 17th round, with the 440th overall pick, of the 1968 NFL draft. He signed with the team in February 1968. He suffered a cracked helmet, a broken nose, multiple wrist bone fractures, and an aggravated hamstring after being blindsided on a punt against the Miami Dolphins. Overall, Koontz, played in six games, starting one, for the Patriots during the 1968 season as a linebacker. He was cut by the Patriots on July 28, 1969.

Koontz was later a member of the Quincy Giants of the Atlantic Coast Football League (ACFL) in 1969.

== Personal life ==
Koontz worked for Budweiser after his football career.
