= Booth School (Philadelphia) =

Coordinates: 40.01702°N 75.35376°W

- Rosemont, Pennsylvania; United States

Information
- Type: Private
- Motto: Quod ero spero
- Established: 1938
- Closed: 1976
- Headmistress: Phoebe Booth
- Enrollment: 300+ at peak
- Campus: Suburban
- Colors: Blue and white

The Booth School or "The Booth School: A Country School for Boys and Girls" was a private secondary school in the Philadelphia Main Line suburbs from 1938 to 1976. The 27-acre (110,000 m^{2}) campus it occupied for most of its existence was located at the intersection of Ithan Avenue and Clyde Road in Rosemont, Pennsylvania, and is now the site of Hill Top Preparatory School; this site is in Radnor Township.

== History ==
=== Timeline ===
The school was founded as The Devon School in 1938 by Phoebe Booth (Mrs. John Wesley Booth, née Barsby). A graduate of West Chester University (at that time West Chester Normal School), the former one-room school-teacher gathered several neighbors to serve as teachers. They started the school in the Booth residence at the old Samuel Eckert "Rockwood" estate on East Waterloo Avenue in Devon, Pennsylvania, with about 20 students. The Rockwood facilities included the house itself as well as classrooms occupying a converted Carriage House built in 1891 and an adjacent gymnasium constructed in the late 1930s. By 1940, the school name had been changed to The Booth School, and it had grown to serve grades 1-9 with a Nursery School and a Kindergarten, employing 13 faculty in addition to Mrs. Booth. Continued growth resulted in the school moving to a larger location at the old Snowden estate (its final location) in Rosemont, PA in 1944.

Mrs. Booth served as the school's only headmistress. Innovative in educational issues (such as coeducation and teaching of reading through phonics) and conservative in outlook, Mrs. Booth was both admired and criticized by her students. Associate headmistress Phoebe Booth Dechert (Mrs. Peter Dechert), Mrs. Booth's daughter, assisted in administration. Mrs. Dechert also taught English and other subjects, directed student plays, and later spearheaded the school's development from a respected elementary school to a full 12-year curriculum in 1961, making it K-12 and over 300 strong at its peak.

Booth also had a summer school and a summer camp called "Hurricane Hill" on its campus.

The Booth School closed in 1976. Some of the faculty participated in the founding of the Woodlynde School of Strafford, at about the same time Booth closed.

=== Facilities ===
The main building on the Devon, PA campus was a residence originally built by Samuel Eckert in the late 1800's. An additional single-story building utilized a converted Carriage House constructed by Eckert in 1891. A small gymnasium was constructed prior to 1940 for basketball and badminton to augment the extensive 9 acre grounds used for other sports such as hockey, soccer, and softball. A tennis court was mentioned in promotional literature from that time period but no information regarding its location is provided.

The main building on the Rosemont, PA campus was a Georgian mansion originally built for the Snowdon family in 1917. An additional single-story building was built in 1961 for the Upper (high) school classes. In the early 1970s a small gymnasium was constructed to permit physical education during the winter months.

=== Afterword ===
Mrs. Booth died in April 1985 at the age of 89. Mrs. Dechert and her family moved to Santa Fe, New Mexico, in 1968, where she worked in theater and conservation and died on October 9, 2005.

It is not known whether any school records are still in existence. There are no Booth records at Hill Top or at Woodlynde. A group of alumni has formed to facilitate contact and networking with former school members (currently using a Yahoogroup).

A number of Booth School yearbooks, from 1962–1967, are held at the Sanderson Museum of Chadds Ford, PA. (Christian C. Sanderson, a local historian and fiddler, taught square-dancing at the school for a number of years.)

A local Booth reunion was held at the old campus in June 2009. A national reunion was held during the weekend of June 18–20, 2010, at the same location.

== Notable attendees ==
- John de Lancie, '67, actor--Star Trek's "Q"
