= Hanover Township, Northampton County, Pennsylvania =

Township in Pennsylvania, US

Hanover Township
- Township
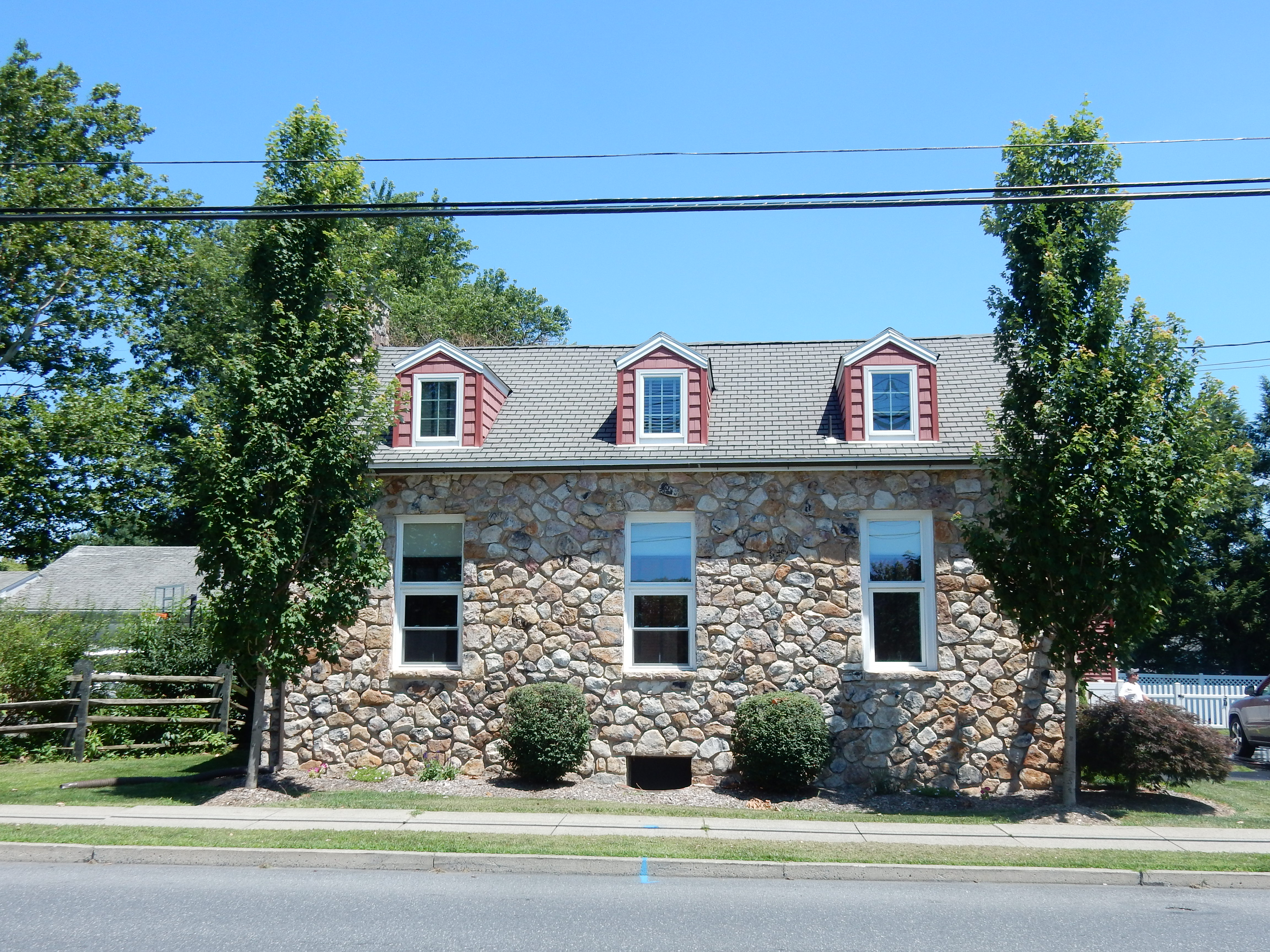
- Schortz Old School House, constructed in 1871, in Hanover Township

- Flag Seal

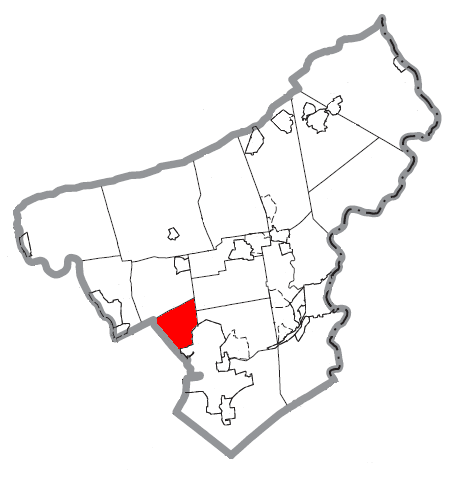
- Hanover Township within Northampton County, Pennsylvania
- Coordinates: 40°41′00″N 75°22′59″W
- Country: United States
- State: Pennsylvania
- County: Northampton

Area
  - Township: 6.58 sq mi (17.03 km^{2})
  - Land: 6.55 sq mi (16.97 km^{2})
  - Water: 0.023 sq mi (0.06 km^{2})
- Elevation: 390 ft (120 m)

Population (2020)
  - Township: 11,785
  - Estimate (2023): 11,629
  - Density: 1,770/sq mi (682/km^{2})
  - Metro: 865,310 (US: 68th)
- Time zone: UTC-5 (EST)
  - Summer (DST): UTC-4 (EDT)
- ZIP Codes: 18017, 18109
- Area code: 610
- FIPS code: 42-095-32432
- Primary airport: Lehigh Valley International Airport
- Major hospital: Lehigh Valley Hospital–Cedar Crest
- School district: Bethlehem Area
- Website: www.hanovertwp-nc.org

Hanover Township is a township in Northampton County, Pennsylvania, United States. The population of Hanover Township was 11,785 at the 2020 census.

Hanover Township is 7.7 miles (12.4 km) northeast of Allentown, 67.4 miles (108.5 km) north of Philadelphia, and 86.4 miles (139.0 km) west of New York City. Hanover Township is part of the Lehigh Valley metropolitan area, which has a population of 861,899 and is the 68th-most populated metropolitan area in the U.S. as of the 2020 census.

== Geography ==
According to the U.S. Census Bureau, the township has a total area of 6.7 square miles (17 km^{2}), all land. It is drained by Monocacy Creek and Catasauqua Creek into the Lehigh River. Its villages include Hanoverville, Schoenersville, Stoke Park, and Westgate Hills. Hanover Township is a suburb of the city of Bethlehem, which lies just south of Hanover. Officially, the township has never been considered as a section of the city of Bethlehem, rather just a neighboring community with a strong connection to its large municipal neighbor to the south.

=== Neighboring municipalities ===
- East Allen Township (north)
- Lower Nazareth Township (northeast)
- Bethlehem Township (east)
- Bethlehem (southeast and southwest)
- Hanover Township, Lehigh County (west)

== Demographics ==
Historical population
Census	Pop.	Note	%±
2000	9,563		—
2010	10,866		13.6%
2020	11,785		8.5%
2023 (est.)	11,629		−1.3%
U.S. Decennial Census

As of the census of 2010, there were 10,866 people, 4,245 households, and 3,144 families residing in the township. The population density was 1,634.9 inhabitants per square mile (631.2/km^{2}). There were 4,245 housing units at an average density of 638.7 per square mile (246.6/km^{2}). The racial makeup of the township was 87.12% White, 2.74% African American, 0.05% Native American, 6.53% Asian, 1.44% from other races, and 2.12% from two or more races. Hispanic or Latino of any race were 4.83% of the population.

There were 3,633 households, out of which 32.8% had children under the age of 18 living with them, 69.1% were married couples living together, 5.3% had a female householder with no husband present, and 23.4% were non-families. 20.3% of all households were made up of individuals, and 9.4% had someone living alone who was 65 years of age or older. The average household size was 2.59 and the average family size was 3.01.

In the township, the population was spread out, with 24.7% under the age of 18, 4.5% from 18 to 24, 26.3% from 25 to 44, 27.0% from 45 to 64, and 17.8% who were 65 years of age or older. The median age was 44.5 years. For every 100 females, there were 94.1 males. For every 100 females age 18 and over, there were 91.6 males. The median income for a household in the township was $64,889, and the median income for a family was $72,661. Males had a median income of $53,158 versus $33,569 for females. The per capita income for the township was $29,370. About 2.0% of families and 2.2% of the population were below the poverty line, including 1.9% of those under age 18 and 2.9% of those age 65 or over.

== Government ==
Hanover is a Second Class Township, governed by a five person elected Board of Supervisors. Day-to-day operations are overseen by a township manager. Hanover is represented in the Pennsylvania House of Representatives as part of both the 135th Legislative District (voting districts 1, 2, 3, 4, and 6) and the 138th District (voting district 5), both of which districts include other municipalities in Northampton County. The township is represented in the Pennsylvania Senate as part of the 14th District, which includes parts of Lehigh and Northampton Counties. The township is patrolled by the Colonial Regional Police Department. Fire and rescue services are provided by the Hanover Township Volunteer Fire Department.

On the national level, Hanover is a part of Pennsylvania's 7th congressional district, and is currently represented by Ryan Mackenzie. The state's senior (Class I) senator, elected in 2022, is John Fetterman. The state's junior (Class II) member of the United States Senate is Dave McCormick, who was elected in 2024.

== Transportation ==
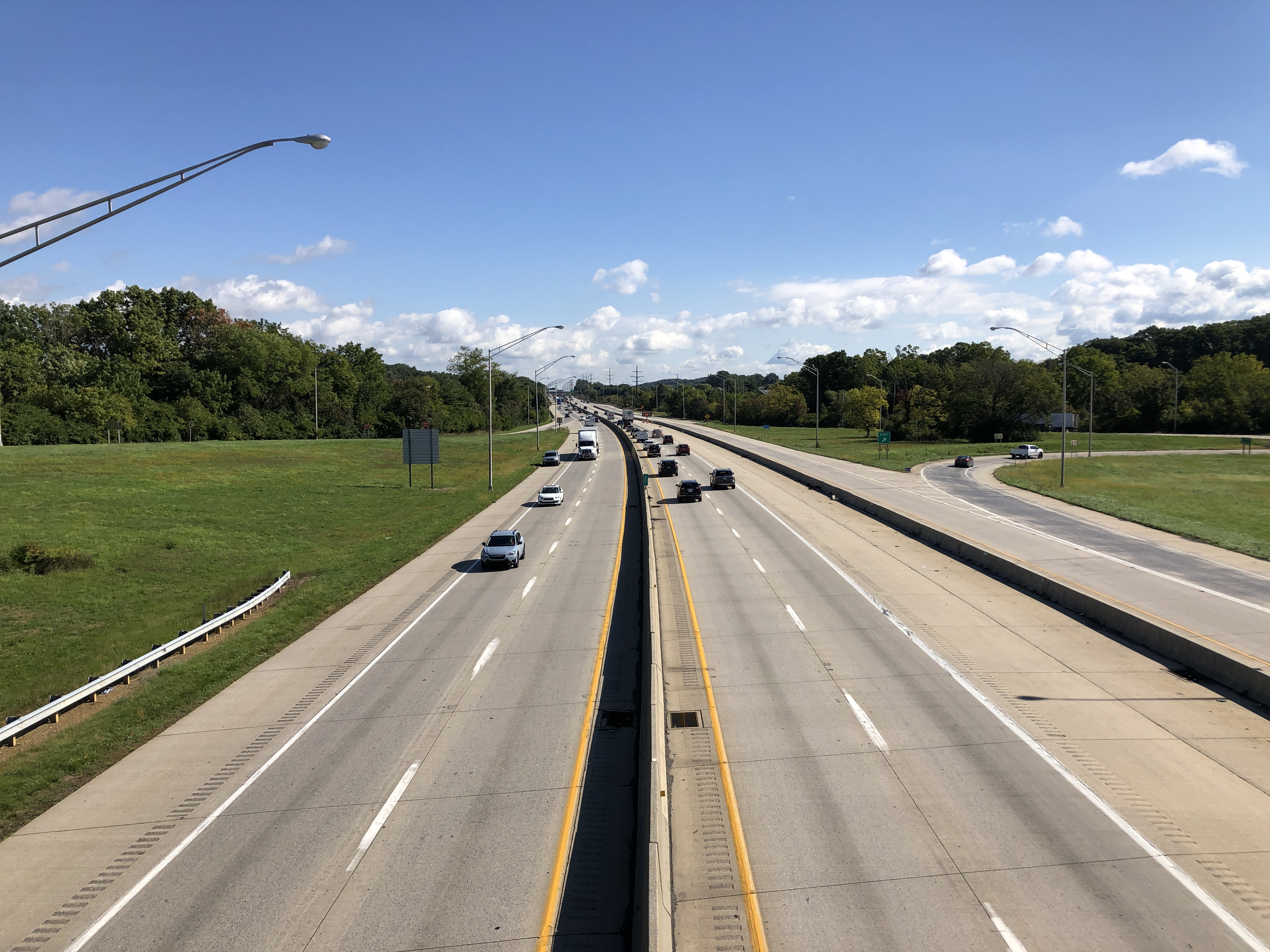
US 22 East in Hanover Township in September 2022

As of 2020, there were 71.18 miles (114.55 km) of public roads in Hanover Township, of which 10.11 miles (16.27 km) were maintained by the Pennsylvania Department of Transportation (PennDOT) and 61.07 miles (98.28 km) were maintained by the township.

U.S. Route 22 is the most prominent highway serving Hanover Township. It follows the Lehigh Valley Thruway along a southwest-northeast alignment across the southern and eastern portions of the township. Pennsylvania Route 512 begins at US 22 in the eastern portion of the township and heads north along the Bath Pike. Pennsylvania Route 987 follows Airport Road along a north-south alignment across the western portion of the township. Other local roads include east-to-west Hanoverville Road, Macada Road, and Stoke Park Road and north-to-south Jacksonville Road and Township Line Road.

== Education ==
The township is served by the Bethlehem Area School District. Asa Packer and Hanover elementary schools are located within the township. Lehigh Valley Academy, a charter school that uses the International Baccalaureate academic program, is also located in the township.

== Gallery ==
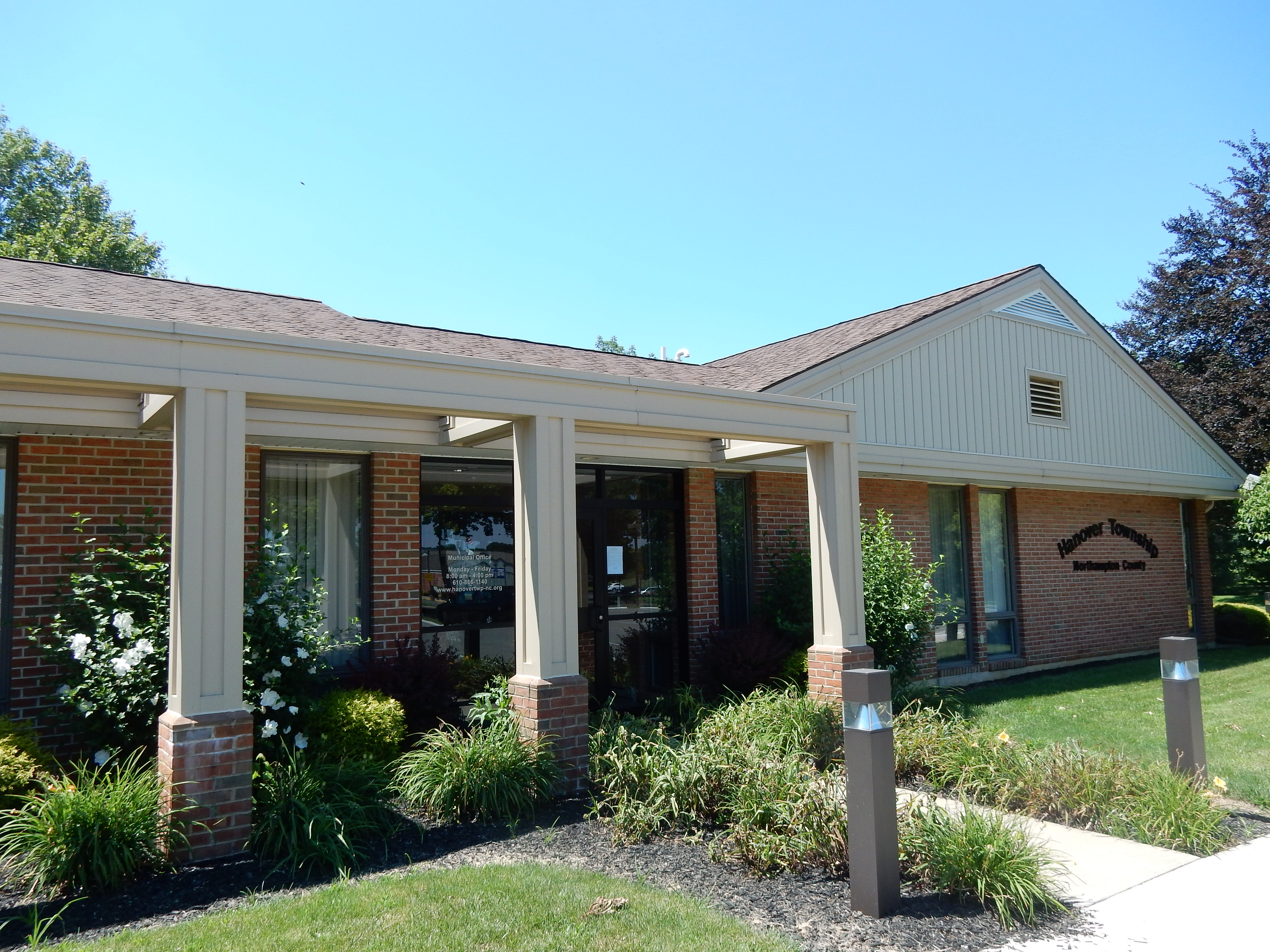
Township Municipal Office

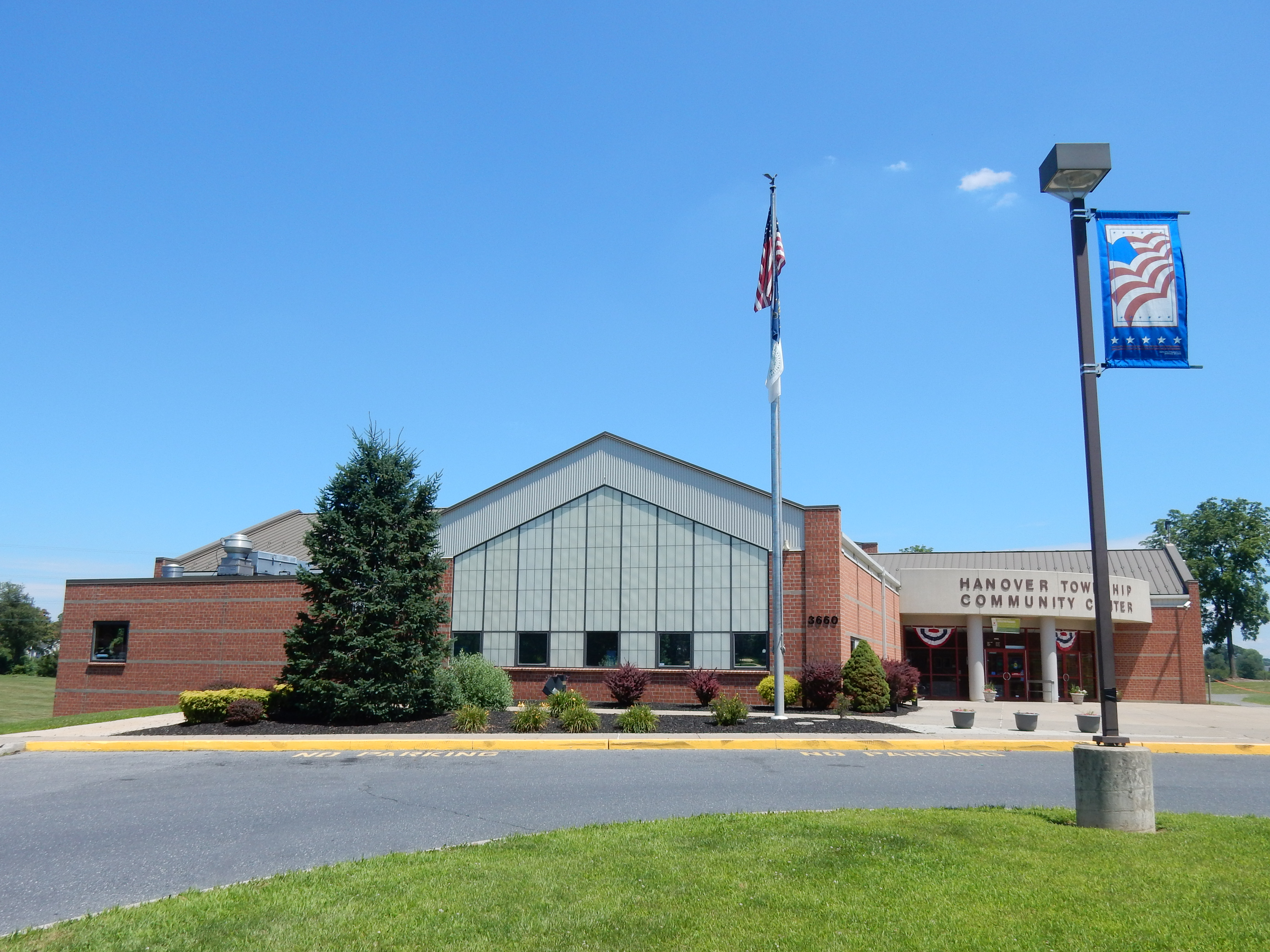
Community Center

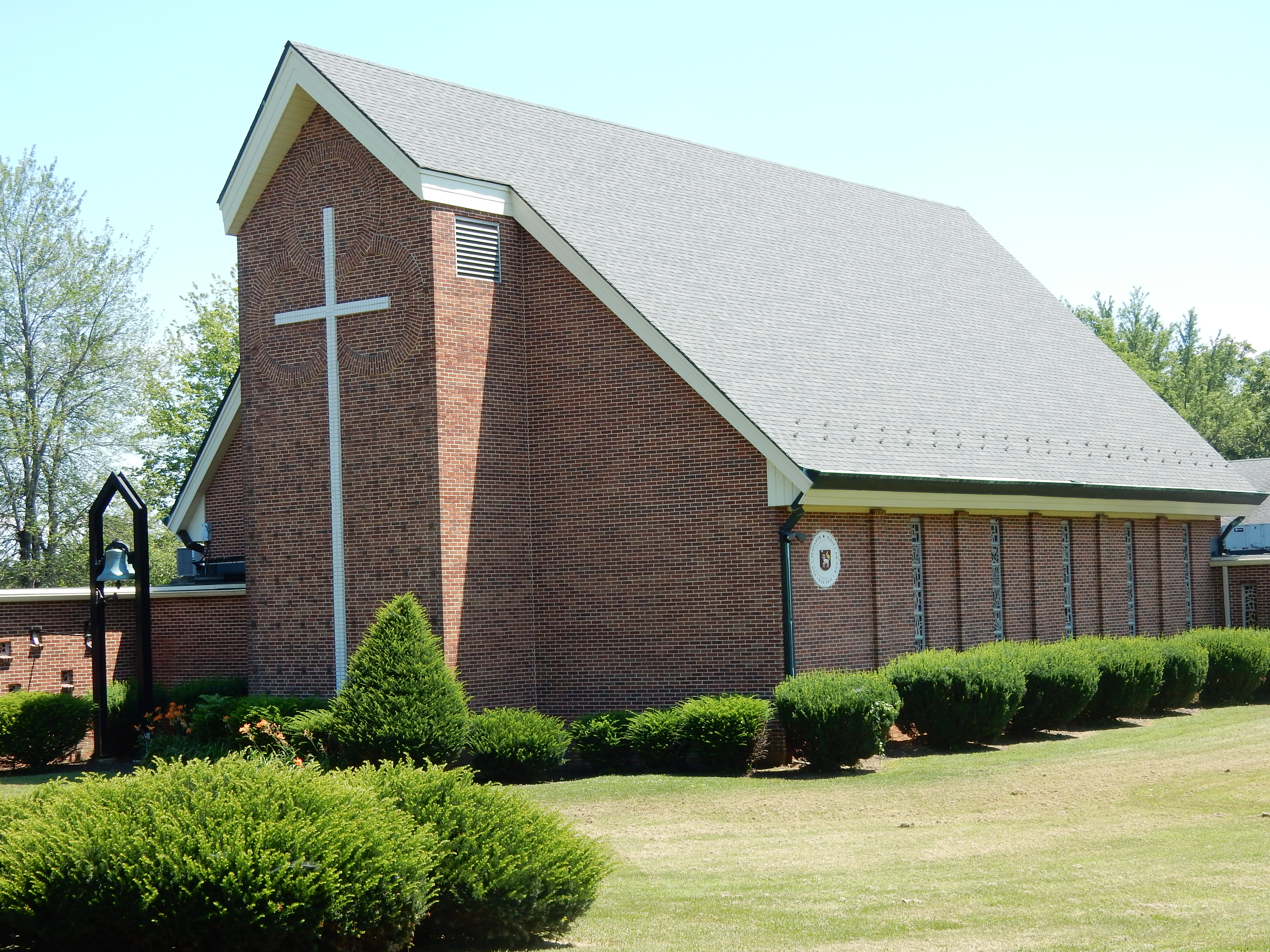
Advent Moravian Church

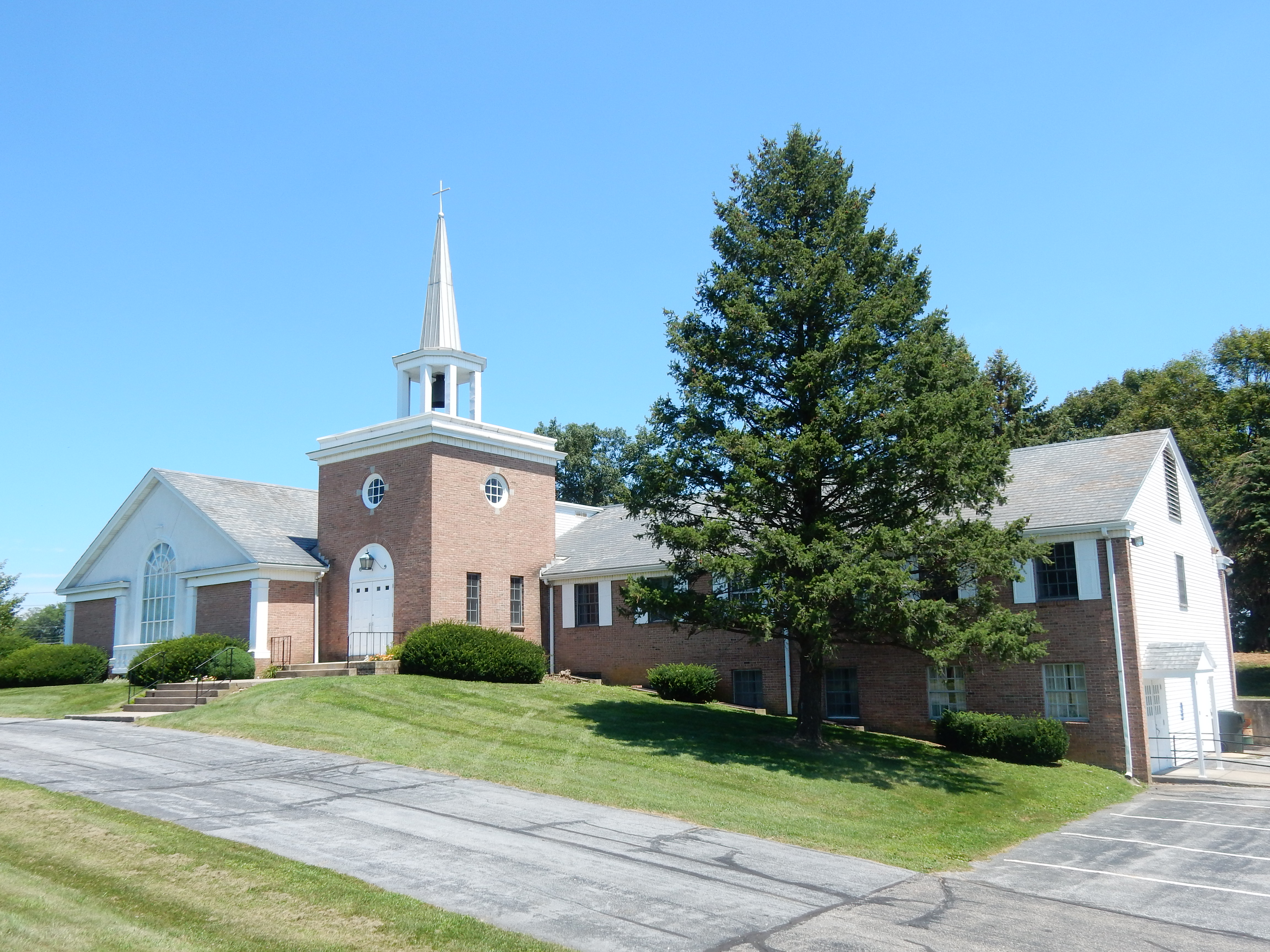
Christ United Church of Christ in Schoenersville

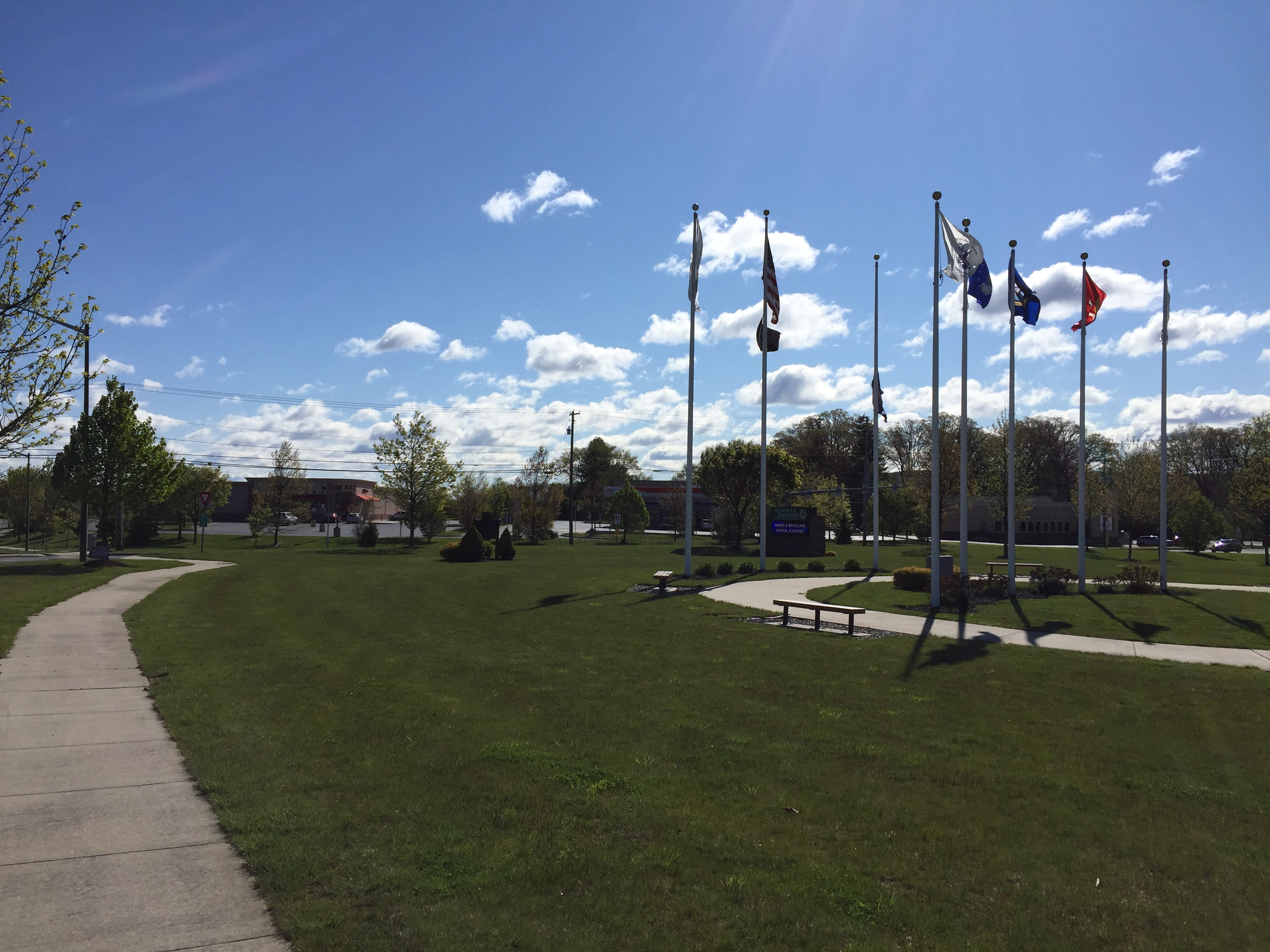
Armed Services Park
