= Gobrecht =

Gobrecht is a surname. Notable people with the surname include:

- Chris Gobrecht (born 1955), American basketball coach
- Christian Gobrecht (1785–1844), United States Mint engraver
- W. J. Gobrecht (1930-2023), American football player and coach

== See also ==
- Gobrecht dollar, a United States silver dollar
