= Wellsboro Area School District =

School district in Pennsylvania

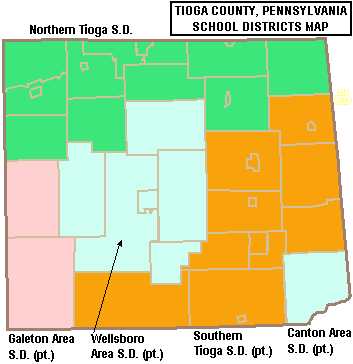

Address
- 227 Nichols Street Wellsboro, Tioga County, Pennsylvania, 16901; United States

District information
- Type: Public
- Grades: K-12

Other information
- Website: https://www.wellsborosd.org/

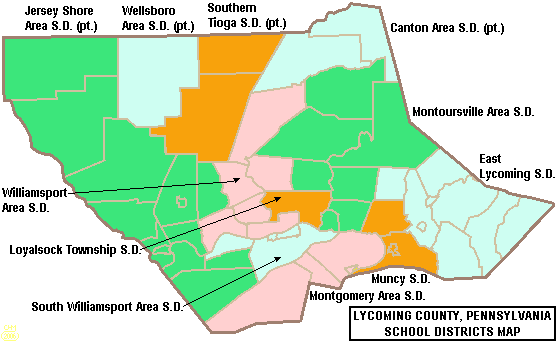
Map of Lycoming County, Pennsylvania Public School Districts

The Wellsboro Area School District is a small, rural/suburban public school district located in central Tioga County. Wellsboro Area School District encompasses approximately 330 square miles (850 km^{2}). The district serves the borough of Wellsboro and also serves: Middlebury Township, Charleston Township, Delmar Township, Duncan Township, and Shippen Township. Pine Township in Lycoming County, Pennsylvania, which is not connected to the rest of the district, is also served. According to 2000 federal census data, the district served a resident population of 11,689. By 2010, the District's population rose slightly to 11,800 people. The educational attainment levels for the Wellsboro Area School District population (25 years old and over) were 90.2% high school graduates and 24.3% college graduates. The district is one of the 500 public school districts of Pennsylvania.

According to the Pennsylvania Budget and Policy Center, 31.8% of the District's pupils lived at 185% or below the Federal Poverty Level as shown by their eligibility for the federal free or reduced price school meal programs in 2012. In 2009, the District residents' per capita income was $17,091, while the median family income was $39,850. In Tioga County, the median household income was $44,187. In the Commonwealth, the median family income was $49,501 and the United States median family income was $49,445, in 2010. By 2013, the median household income in the United States rose to $52,100. In 2014, the median household income in the USA was $53,700.

Wellsboro Area School District operates four schools: Charlotte Lappla Elementary (K-1), Don Gill Elementary (2-4 grades), Rock Butler Middle (5-8 grades), and Wellsboro Area High School (9-12 grades). The District also offers Wellsboro Online Academy to pupils permitting k-12 students to opt for an online learning environment, rather than attending the traditional brick and mortar school buildings.

== Extracurriculars ==
Wellsboro Area School District offers an extensive extracurricular program, including clubs, arts and interscholastic athletics program.

=== Sports ===
The District funds:

Boys

- Baseball - AA
- Basketball - AA
- Cross Country - Class A
- Football - A
- Golf - AA
- Soccer - A
- Tennis - AA
- Track and Field - AA
- Wrestling - AA

Girls

- Basketball - AA
- Cross Country - Class A
- Golf - AA
- Soccer (Fall) - A
- Softball - AA
- Girls' Tennis - AA
- Track and Field - AA
- Volleyball - AA

Middle School Sports

Boys

- Basketball
- Cross Country
- Football
- Soccer
- Wrestling

Girls

- Basketball
- Cross Country
- Soccer (Fall)
- Volleyball

According to PIAA directory July 2015
