= Schoenersville, Pennsylvania =

Village in Pennsylvania, United States

Coordinates: 40°39′48″N 75°25′29″W

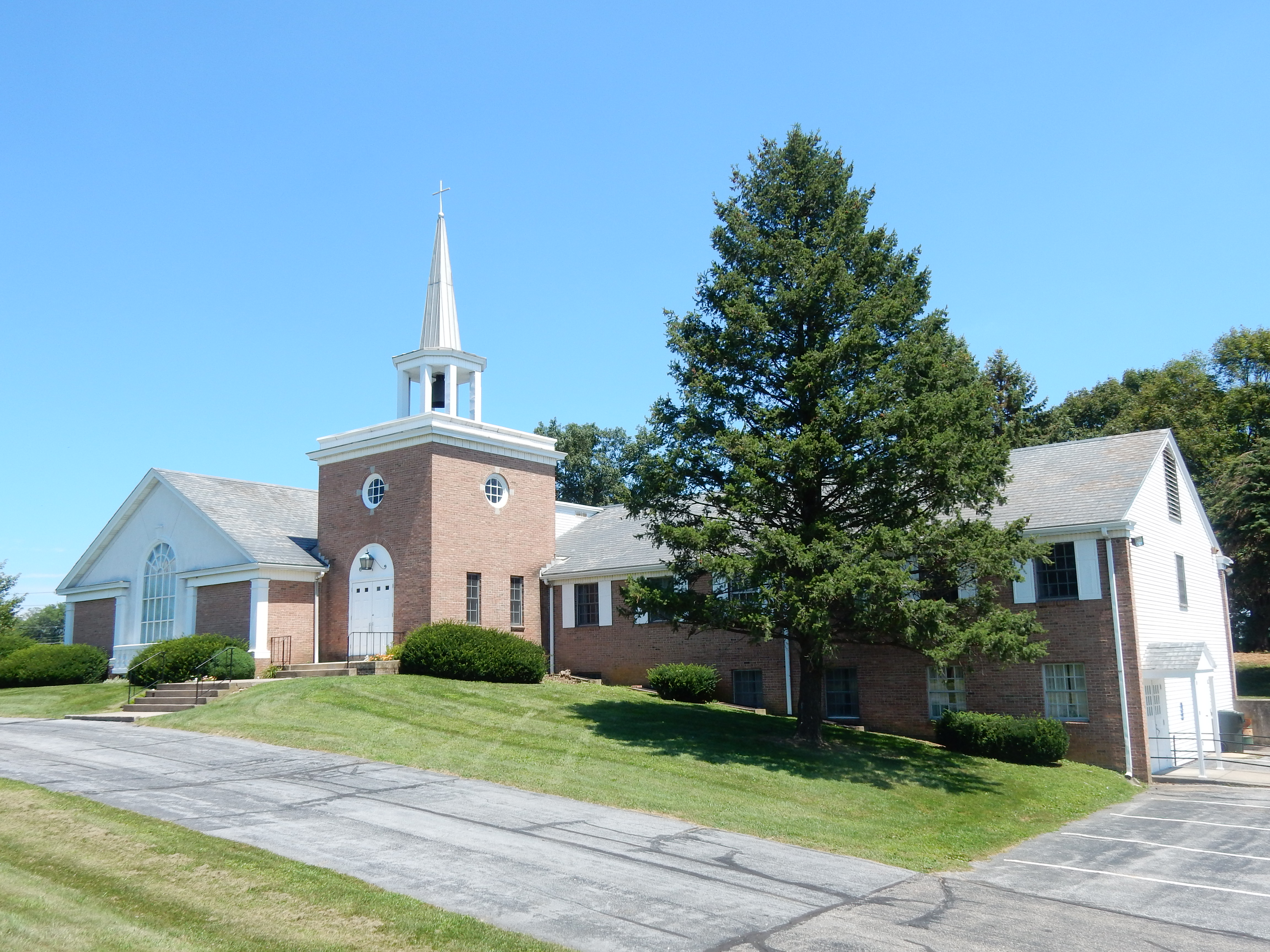
Christ United Church of Christ in Hanover Township, July 2015

Schoenersville is a suburban village split between Hanover Township in Lehigh County and Hanover Township in Northampton County, Pennsylvania. It is pronounced "SHAY-nerz-vil" and is part of the Lehigh Valley metropolitan area, which has a population of 861,899 and is the 68th-most populous metropolitan area in the U.S. as of the 2020 census.

== History ==
Schoenersville is named after its original settler, Adam Schoener, who established a farm in the area that would become the village in 1784. Adam's father, Heinrich, migrated to America in 1717, having been born in Ehrstadt, Baden-Württemberg. The area would be opened to settlers with the opening of a tavern named the "Blue Ball," either for its no vacancy sign, or for a stagecoach signal. Adam and his wife would build a brick house near Christ's Church, the oldest religious structure in Hanover township. There are conflicting reports to the Blue Ball's origins, either being established by Adam in 1794, or by a Jacob Clader in 1776, before being sold to Adam in 1791, regardless, the Blue Ball was an important midway stop for travelers from Mauch Chunk to Philadelphia and would be inherited by Adam's son, Thomas Schoener, after Adam died in 1849, before selling the property in 1852.

The Allentown Democrat reported that the Blue Ball was razed on April 29, 1896, by one E.R. Benner, the village's Recorder of Deeds, who planned to build a family home on the property. However, the local Schoenersville Inn claimed to be the original Blue Ball following a purported sale in 1830, and remained open until 1988.

Lehigh Valley International Airport is located just southwest of the village. From the early 1990s through July 2004, the Airport Authority bought up and cleared 11 of the village's properties, in a total of 35 acres, in order to comply with an FAA mandate for a runway protective zone. The most prominent property demolished was Partridge in a Pear Tree, the only clothing store in town, which had been open since 1979, with the building it occupied being built in 1868. There was a citizens effort to apply the building to the Pennsylvania Historic and Museum Commission as a historical landmark, however, the Commission rejected its landmark status, stating that it had been extensively modified too many times, and no longer had historical significance.

== Geography ==
Schoenersville Road, which runs from the northwest to the southeast, serves as the county line, coming up from Bethlehem and meeting northeast to southwest with Airport Road, also known as Route 987, in the village. Beyond there, it becomes Weaversville Road. Schoenersville is split between the Allentown ZIP Code of 18109 and the Bethlehem ZIP Code of 18017.
