= W. J. Gobrecht =

American athlete and coach (1930–2023)

Biographical details
- Born: November 4, 1930; Hanover, Pennsylvania, U.S.
- Died: 5 June 2023 (aged 92)

Playing career

Football
- 1949–1952: Dickinson

Basketball
- c. 1950: Dickinson
- Position: Halfback

Coaching career (HC unless noted)

Football
- 1954–1959: Littlestown HS (PA)
- 1960–1965: Dickinson (backfield)
- 1965–1979: Dickinson
- 1984: Dickinson (interim HC)

Basketball
- 1954–?: Littlestown HS (PA)

Head coaching record
- Overall: 52–76–7 (college football); 42–10–2 (high school football)

Wilbur Jacob "Goby" Gobrecht (November 4, 1930 – June 5, 2023) was an American football and basketball player and coach. He died on June 5, 2023, at the age of 92.

== Playing career ==
Gobrecht was an all-conference halfback for Dickinson College from 1949 until 1952, where he also played on the basketball and track and field teams.

== Coaching career ==
Gobrecht was the head football coach at Dickinson College in Carlisle, Pennsylvania and he held that position for 16 seasons, from 1965 until 1979 and then returning for the 1984 season. His coaching record at Dickinson was 52–76–7.
