= Canton Area School District =

School district in Pennsylvania, U.S.

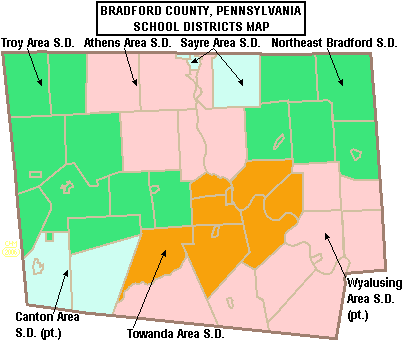

Address
- 509 East Main Street Canton, Pennsylvania, 17724-1698; United States

District information
- Type: Public

Students and staff
- District mascot: Warriors
- Colors: Crimson and white

Other information
- Website: https://www.canton.k12.pa.us/

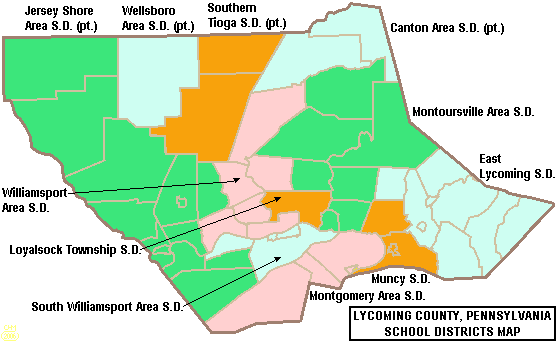
Map of Lycoming County, Pennsylvania Public School Districts

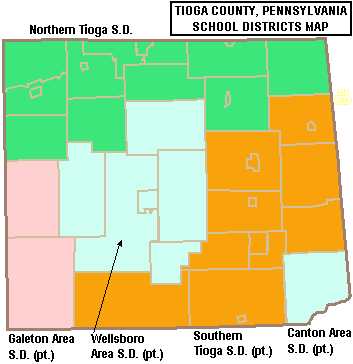
Map of Tioga County, Pennsylvania Public School Districts

The Canton Area School District is a diminutive, rural, Pennsylvania public school district that encompasses approximately 204 square miles (530 km^{2}). Canton Area School District is split over three counties. In Bradford County, it serves Canton Township including Canton Borough; while excluding the borough of Alba, and Leroy Township. In Lycoming County, the district serves McIntyre Township including the villages of Marsh Hill and Ralston; and McNett Township including the villages of Chemung, Ellenton, Leolyn, Penbryn, and Roaring Branch. In Tioga County, the district serves Union Township. According to 2000 local census data, the district serves a resident population of 6,213. By 2010, the district's population increased to 6,534 people. The educational attainment levels for the Canton Area School District population (25 years old and over) were 86.6% high school graduates and 10.9% college graduates. The district is one of the 500 public school districts of Pennsylvania.

According to the Pennsylvania Budget and Policy Center, 45.4% of the Canton Area School District's pupils lived at 185% or below the Federal Poverty Level as shown by their eligibility for the federal free or reduced price school meal programs in 2012. In 2009, Canton Area School District residents’ per capita income was $14,597, while the median family income was $37,156. In the Commonwealth, the median family income was $49,501 and the United States median family income was $49,445, in 2010. By 2013, the median household income in the United States rose to $52,100.

Canton Area School District operates 2 traditional schools: Canton Area Elementary School and Canton Junior Senior High School. The district also operates an alternative school called the Focus Support Academy. The program presents a placement for at risk students and those with behavioral issues that disrupt the classroom. The facility can accommodate up to twelve students. Focus Support Academy is located in the Gleckner building in Canton. When a student needs more intensive services like constant emotional support services, an out-of-district placement is pursued. Canton Area High School students may attend Northern Tier Career Center for vocational training.

== Extracurriculars ==
The Canton Area School District offers a variety of clubs, activities and sports for high school and junior high school students. Eligibility to participate is set by school board policies.

=== Clubs ===
- Band
- Students Against Destructive Decisions
- FFA
- Language clubs
- Scholarship Challenge
- Library Club
- DJ Club

=== Sports ===
The district provides the following varsity sports:

Boys

- Baseball- A
- Basketball - AA
- Cross country - A
- Football - A
- Track and field - AA
- Wrestling - AA

Girls

- Basketball - A
- Cheerleading - AAAA
- Cross Country - A
- Softball - A
- Track and field - AA
- Volleyball - A

Junior high school sports

Boys

- Basketball
- Cross country
- Football
- Track and field
- Wrestling

Girls

- Basketball
- Cross country
- Track and field
- Volleyball

- According to PIAA directory July 2015
