= Adams County Christian Academy =

Coordinates: 39.87786°N 77.23925°W

- 1865 Biglerville Road; Gettysburg, Pennsylvania; United States

Information
- Type: Private
- Motto: Love, Learn, Lead
- Head of school: Edward Moe
- Grades: Pre-K-12
- Enrollment: 86
- Campus type: Rural
- Colors: Blue, yellow, and white
- Mascot: Ram
- Website: www.adamscountychristian.org

Adams County Christian Academy is a growing private Christian school located near the borough of Gettysburg, in Adams County, Pennsylvania, United States. The school was founded in 1984. The school's mascot is the ram. Mission Statement: Grounded in the love of Christ, Adams County Christian Academy provides distinctive discipleship opportunities and rigorous academics for students to lead and impact their world for Jesus Christ.

== See also ==
- List of high schools in Pennsylvania
