= Halo Meadows =

American actress

- Born: Myrtle Louise Stonesifer; May 1, 1905; Littlestown, Pennsylvania, U.S.
- Died: May 12, 1985 (aged 80); Littlestown, Pennsylvania, U.S.
- Resting place: Mount Carmel Cemetery
- Other name: Louise Howard
- Education: Wilson College; Hood College; University of Pennsylvania
- Occupations: Actress, writer, dancer
- Spouse: The Amazing Criswell (1940–1974)
- Parent(s): Howard A. Stonesifer; Etta Sarah Frances Crouse

Halo Meadows (May 1, 1905 – May 12, 1985) was an American actress, writer and playwright. She also used Louise Howard as a pseudonym.

== Early life ==
Born Myrtle Louise Stonesifer in Littlestown, Pennsylvania, she attended the public schools in Littlestown. She later went to Wilson College and then transferred to Hood College where she graduated. She attained her Masters in drama from the University of Pennsylvania, went to a dramatics school in New York City and then worked off-Broadway under the stage name of Louise Howard.

The name Halo Meadows is apparently one that recurred throughout her life in her not-so-secret second career as a burlesque dancer. It was by this name that most people knew her during the last half of her life, and by which is she generally known to fans of movie director Ed Wood in her capacity as Criswell's eccentric wife.

== Personal life ==
Meadows married Jeron Criswell King and moved to Hollywood. She became a writer and her husband later became nationally famous as The Amazing Criswell, a popular psychic. Together they authored books such as How Your Play Can Crash Broadway and How to Crash Tin-Pan Alley.

Halo Meadows appeared as a contestant on the December 27, 1956 episode of the TV quiz program You Bet Your Life, hosted by Groucho Marx. She sang her composition, "Chop My Head Off".
