= The Workshop School =

- Founded: Philadelphia, Pennsylvania
- Founders: Simon Hauger, Michael Clapper, Matthew Riggan, Ann Cohen, Aiden Downey
- Headquarters: 221 S Hanson St, Philadelphia, PA 19139
- Website: www.workshopschool.org

The Workshop School is a project based school in the city of Philadelphia and one of the ten Citywide Admission school of The School District of Philadelphia

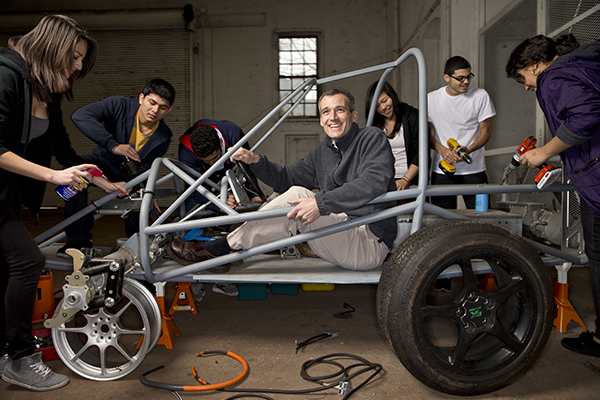
Simon Hauger with students 2012
