= Johnstown Christian School =

Coordinates: 40.24934°N 78.95251°W

Johnstown Christian School (Holsopple, PA)

Location
- 125 Christian School Rd; Holsopple, PA 15935; United States

Information
- Type: Christian School
- Established: 1944
- Founder: Sanford Shetler
- President: Michael Dean, Board of Directors
- Administrator: Mrs. Celeste Sprankle
- Principal: Margaret Adkins, Dean of Students; Melinda Hodges, Elementary Principal
- Teaching staff: 23.4
- Grades: PK-12
- Gender: Coeducational
- Enrollment: 270
- Colors: Blue and white
- Nickname: Blue jay
- Accreditation: ACSI
- Yearbook: Mem-O-Re
- Affiliation: Christian (no specific denomination)
- Website: Johnstown Christian School

Johnstown Christian School is a private Christian school in Hollsopple, Pennsylvania. It was founded in 1944 by a group of Mennonite families. The school was reorganized in 1973 as the Johnstown Christian School. The school serves children in pre-kindergarten through 12th grade.

== History ==
Johnstown Mennonite School was founded in 1944 by Sanford Shetler, who served as principal from 1944 to 1968. The school was reorganized in 1973.

== Demographics ==
As of the 2021-2022 school year, there were 216 students enrolled in grades PK-12. Of these, none were American Indian, 2 were Asian, 7 were Black, 2 Hispanic, 161 White, 2 Hawaiian or Pacific Islander and 12 were of two or more races. There were 23.4 classroom teachers on a full-time-equivalent basis for a student-teacher ratio of 7.9.
