= Venango Catholic High School =

Location
- 1505 West First Street; Oil City, (Venango County), Pennsylvania 16301; United States
- Coordinates: 41°24′50″N 79°43′30″W

Information
- Type: Private, Coeducational
- Religious affiliation: Roman Catholic
- Oversight: Diocese of Erie
- President: Mr. Dominic Varacallo
- Principal: Ms. Katherine Chandley
- Grades: 7-12
- Education system: Venango Region Catholic School
- Colors: Black and Gold
- Nickname: VC
- Team name: Vikings
- Accreditation: Middle States Association of Colleges and Schools
- Website: http://www.venangocatholic.org

Venango Catholic High School is a private, Roman Catholic high school in Oil City, Pennsylvania. It is located in the Roman Catholic Diocese of Erie.

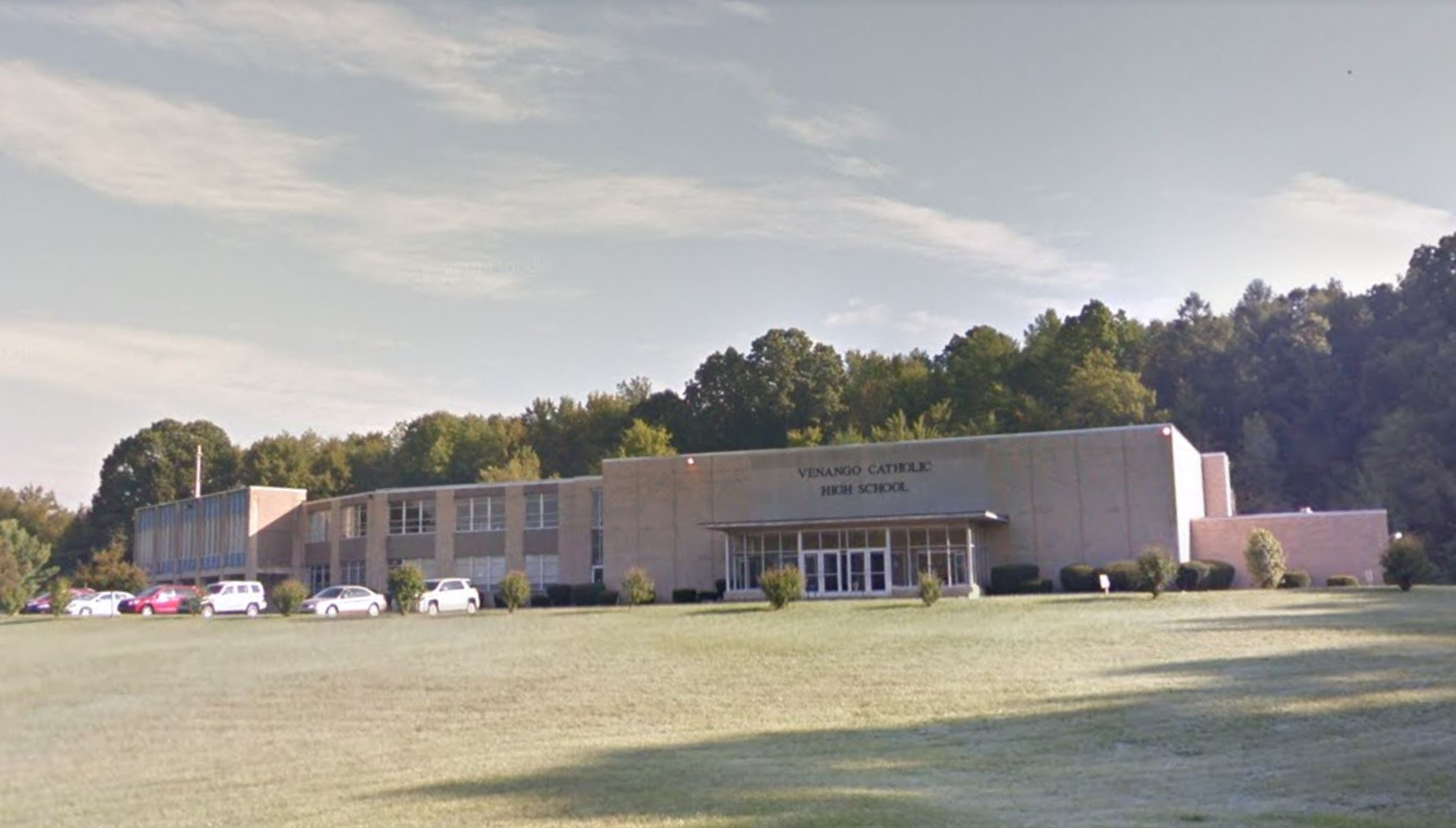
Venango Catholic High School from the exterior
