= Moshannon Valley Junior/Senior High School =

Moshannon Valley Junior/Senior High School "Mo-Valley”
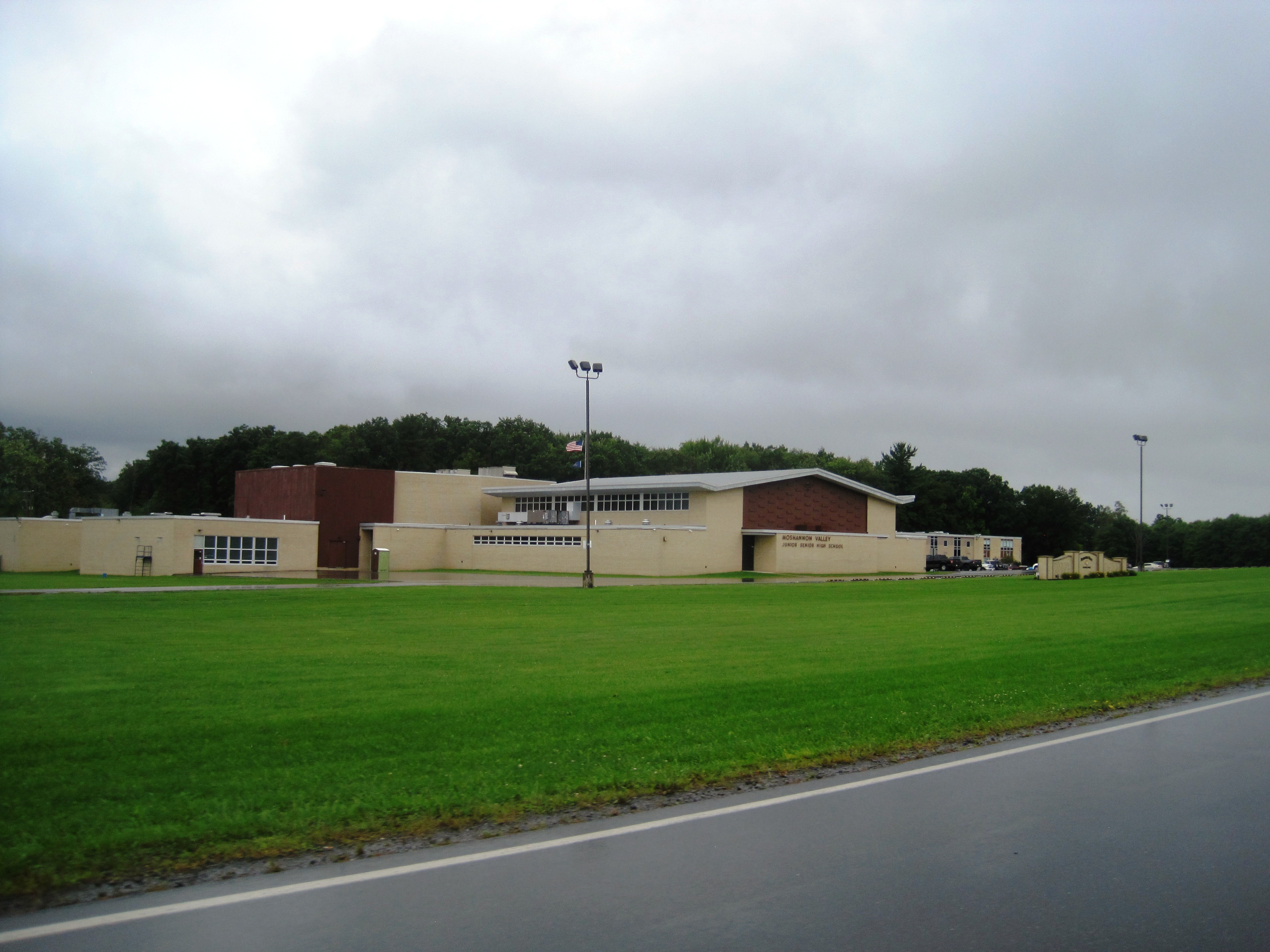

Location
- 4934 Green Acre Road; Houtzdale, Pennsylvania; 40.8295°N 78.4028°W

Information
- Type: Public
- Motto: Ensuring Every Student Succeeds.
- NCES School ID: 421596001550
- Faculty: 26.51 (on FTE basis)
- Grades: 7–12
- Enrollment: 366 (2023-2024)
- Student to teacher ratio: 13.81
- Campus type: Rural
- Colors: Black, White and Gold
- Mascot: Black Knight
- Website: www.movalley.org

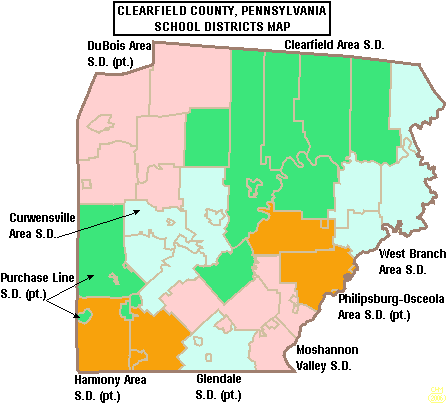
Map of Clearfield County, Pennsylvania Public School Districts

Moshannon Valley Junior/Senior High School is a public high school located near the borough of Houtzdale, Pennsylvania. The high school serves students from most of southeastern Clearfield County. The school's mascot is the Black Knights. The school is part of the Moshannon Valley School District.

In its 2024 high school rankings, the Clearfield County Progress Report ranked the school second among high schools in Clearfield County.

== Administration ==
Key administrative staff also includes High School Principal Kristofer Albright and Dean of Students Thomas Webb

== Extracurriculars ==
The school offers a variety of clubs, activities, and sports.

=== Athletics ===
Athletic Director: Thomas Webb

Athletics conference: District 6 PIAA (Inter-County Conference)

=== Boys Athletics ===
- Baseball - Class A
- Basketball - Class AA
- Football - Class A
- Wrestling - Class A

=== Girls Athletics ===
- Basketball - Class A
- Soccer - Class AA (Merged with Curwensville Area School District)
- Softball - Class A
- Volleyball - Class A
