= Microsoft's School of the Future =

Microsoft School Of The Future

Location
- 4021 Parkside Avenue; Philadelphia, Pennsylvania 19104; United States; 39.97442°N 75.20429°W

Information
- Type: Free public
- Established: 2006
- School district: School District of Philadelphia
- Principal: Richard Sherin
- Grades: 9-11
- Enrollment: 608 (2014-2015)
- Colors: Red and Black
- Mascot: Firebird

Microsoft School of the Future (commonly referred to as the School of the Future) is a public high school located in Philadelphia, Pennsylvania, United States that serves grades 9 through 12 as part of the Philadelphia School District. The school opened on September 7, 2006.

== History ==
After 2 1/2 years of planning, the School District of Philadelphia, Microsoft and The Prisco Group architectural firm designed "School of the Future." The school resides on 8 acres (32,000 m^{2}) in West Philadelphia's Fairmount Park and was designed as a template that can be replicated throughout the country and worldwide on a traditional budget. The design had to incorporate the principle of adaptation at any site, making it able to adjust to smaller or bigger student capacity and incorporate different curricula and programs. The design supports continuous, relevant and adaptive learning principles.

== Recognitions ==
LEED Gold Certified

2006 DesignShare Award

2006 Reader's Digest: Best of America – Best High-Tech High

== See also ==
- Education
- School
- Classroom of the future
