= Williamson Senior High School =

Williamson-Elkland Senior High School
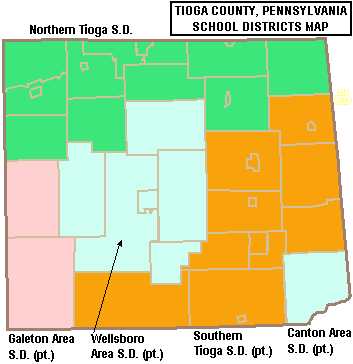

Location
- 33 Jct Cross Road; Tioga, Tioga County, Pennsylvania 16920-1305; United States

Information
- Type: Public
- School district: Northern Tioga School District
- NCES District ID: 4217730
- NCES School ID: 421773006373
- Principal: William Butterfield
- Teaching staff: 43.80 (FTE)
- Grades: 7-12
- Enrollment: 549 (2023–2024)
- Student to teacher ratio: 12.53
- Language: English
- Color: blue gold
- Feeder schools: RB Walter Elementary
- Website: http://www.ntiogasd.org/

Williamson Senior High School is a small, rural, public, combined junior senior high school located in, Tioga, Tioga County, Pennsylvania. It is one of two high schools operated by the Northern Tioga School District. Williamson Senior High School serves the eastern portion of the district.

The BLaST Intermediate Unit IU17 provides the school with a wide variety of services like specialized education for disabled students and hearing, background checks for employees, state mandated recognizing and reporting child abuse training, speech and visual disability services and criminal background check processing for prospective employees and professional development for staff and faculty. Williamson Senior High School does not have an association with a public Career and Technical Center.

== Extracurriculars ==
Northern Tioga School District offers a wide variety of clubs, activities and an extensive, publicly funded sports program at Williamson Senior High School.

=== Sports ===
The district funds the following sports at Williamson:

Varsity

Boys

- Baseball - AA
- Basketball- AA
- Soccer - AA
- Track and field - AA
- Wrestling - AA

Girls

- Basketball - AA
- Soccer - AA
- Softball - AA
- Track and field - AA
- Volleyball - AA

Junior high school sports

Boys

- Baseball
- Basketball
- Soccer
- Wrestling

Girls

- Basketball
- Soccer
- Softball
- Volleyball

According to PIAA directory.
