= Canton Junior Senior High School =

High school in Pennsylvania

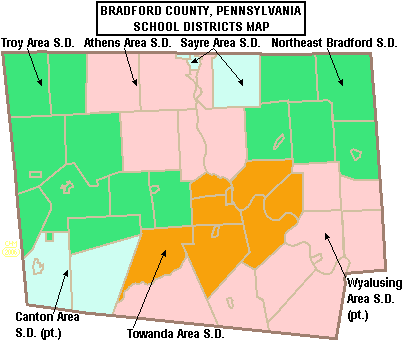

Location
- 509 East Main Street; Canton, Bradford County, Lycoming County, Tioga County, Pennsylvania 17724-1698; United States; 41.6574°N 76.8434°W

Information
- Type: Public
- School district: Canton Area School District
- Principal: Donnie Jacopetti, JHS
- Staff: 30.90 (FTE)
- Faculty: 36 teachers 2013
- Grades: 7-12
- Enrollment: 373 (2023-2024)
- Student to teacher ratio: 12.07
- Colors: Crimson and White
- Fight song: "Weekend Warriors"
- Mascot: Warriors
- Newspaper: Crimson Echo
- Website: https://www.canton.k12.pa.us/

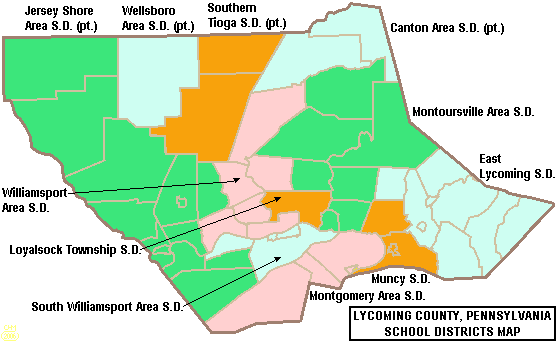
Map of Lycoming County, Pennsylvania Public School Districts

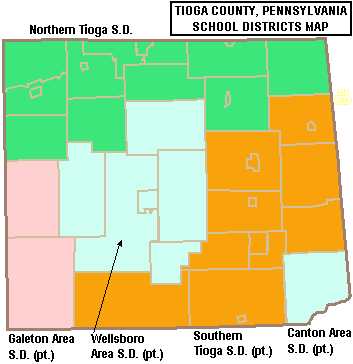
Map of Tioga County, Pennsylvania Public School Districts

Canton Junior Senior High School is a diminutive, rural public combined junior senior high school located at 509 E Main Street, Canton, Pennsylvania. In 2015, Canton Junior Senior High School enrollment was reported as 422 pupils in 7th through 12th grades. Canton Area High School students may attend Northern Tier Career Center for vocational training. In April 2012, Canton Area School District contracted with BLAST Intermediate Unit #17 to provide: special education services, federally funded IDEA services and technology services to the school.

== Extracurriculars ==
The Canton Area School District offers a variety of clubs, activities and sports for high school and junior high school students.

Clubs include:

- Band
- Students Against Destructive Decisions (SADD)
- FFA
- Language clubs
- Scholarship Challenge
- Library Club
- DJ Club

== Sports ==
The district provides the following varsity sports:

Boys

- Baseball- A
- Basketball - AA
- Cross Country - A
- Football - A
- Track and Field - AA
- Wrestling - AA

Girls

- Basketball - A
- Cheerleading - AAAA
- Cross Country - A
- Softball - A
- Track and Field - AA
- Volleyball - A

Junior high school sports

Boys

- Basketball
- Cross Country
- Football
- Track and Field
- Wrestling

Girls

- Basketball
- Cross Country
- Track and Field
- Volleyball

- According to PIAA directory July 2015
