= Dayspring Christian Academy =

Private school in Lancaster, Pennsylvania

Coordinates: 40.042536°N 76.426592°W

Location
- 120 College Avenue; Mountville, Lancaster County, PA 17554; United States

Information
- Type: Private
- Religious affiliation: Christian
- Established: 1987
- Principal: Lower School: Delinda Henry, Upper School: Dr. Randy Hilton
- Grades: Preschool through 12th
- Campus type: Suburban
- Colors: Red, white and blue
- Mascot: Warrior
- Website: https://www.dayspringchristian.com/

Dayspring Christian Academy is a K-12 private Christian school in Mountville, Pennsylvania, accredited by the Association of Christian Schools International and Mid-Atlantic Christian Schools Association. It was founded in 1987. Dayspring Christian Academy offers dual credit and AP courses, focusing on a classical education that includes logic, rhetoric, Latin, Greek, the sciences, mathematics, history and the arts. This form of education, championed by Noah Webster and Benjamin Rush places an emphasis on the Bible.

== History ==
=== Locations ===
- 1987-2004 The Lord’s House of Prayer, Vine Street, Lancaster, PA
- 1992-1996 The Teamster’s Building, Duke Street, Lancaster, PA
- 1996-2004 Pearl Street, Lancaster, PA
- 2001-2010 Burle Business Park, New Holland Avenue, Lancaster, PA
- 2010–present College Avenue, Mountville, PA

== Attributes ==
=== Learning space ===
Dayspring Christian Academy has 24 classrooms, an auditorium, a gymnasium, and administrative offices.

=== Athletics ===
Dayspring Christian Academy offers sports to middle and high school students, and clinics for elementary aged students. Middle school sports include boys soccer, girls volleyball, boys basketball, girls basketball, and track & field. High school sports offered include boys soccer, girls volleyball, golf, boys basketball, girls basketball, girls lacrosse, boys volleyball, and track & field. The school’s colors are red, white, and blue, and student athletes are called the Dayspring Warriors. The athletic logo is red, white, and blue with a warrior holding a shield and spear.

== Demographics ==
| Asian | 0.97% |
| Black or African American | 8.71% |
| Hispanic | 2.26% |
| Two or more races | 7.42% |
| White | 80.65% |

== Awards ==
Voted “best school” in Lancaster County Magazine’s Best of Lancaster awards in 2018, 2019, 2020, 2021, and 2022.
