= Wellsboro Area High School =

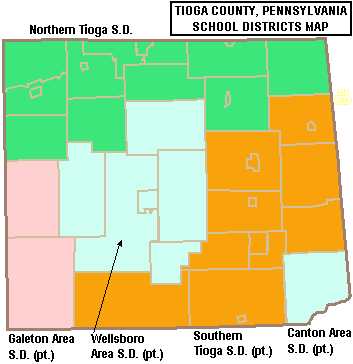

Location
- 225 Nichols Street; Wellsboro, Tioga County, Pennsylvania 16901; United States; 41.7589°N 77.3033°W

Information
- Type: Public
- School district: Wellsboro Area School District
- Principal: Mr. Jeremy Byrd
- Teaching staff: 33.50 (FTE)
- Grades: 9-12
- Enrollment: 455 (2023–2024)
- Student to teacher ratio: 13.58
- Language: English
- Feeder schools: Rock L Butler Middle School
- Website: https://www.wellsborosd.org/o/whs

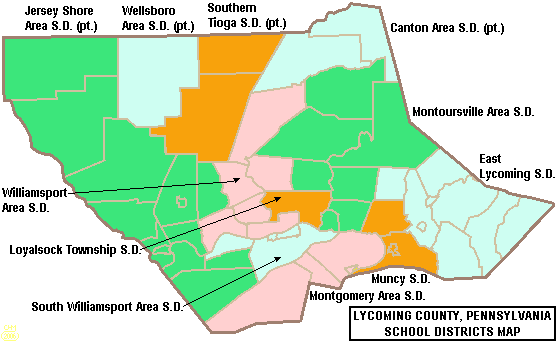
Map of Lycoming County, Pennsylvania Public School Districts

Wellsboro Area High School is a small, rural public high school located at 225 Nichols Street, Wellsboro, Pennsylvania, USA. In 2015, enrollment was reported as 469 pupils in 9th through 12th grades. Wellsboro Area High School employed 38 teachers.

The district also offers Wellsboro Online Academy to pupils permitting K–12 students to opt for an online learning environment, rather than attending the traditional brick and mortar high school building.

The BLaST Intermediate Unit IU17 provides the high school with a wide variety of services like specialized education for disabled students and hearing, background checks for employees, state mandated recognizing and reporting child abuse training, speech and visual disability services and criminal background check processing for prospective employees and professional development for staff and faculty.

== Extracurriculars ==
Wellsboro Area School District offers an extensive extracurricular program, including clubs, arts and an extensive interscholastic athletics program.

=== Sports ===
The district funds:

Boys

- Baseball - AA
- Basketball - AA
- Cross country - Class A
- Football - A
- Golf - AA
- Soccer - A
- Tennis - AA
- Track and field - AA
- Wrestling - AA

Girls

- Basketball - AA
- Cross country - Class A
- Golf - AA
- Soccer - A
- Softball - AA
- Tennis - AA
- Track and field - AA
- Volleyball - AA

Middle school sports

Boys

- Basketball
- Cross country
- Football
- Soccer
- Wrestling

Girls

- Basketball
- Cross country
- Soccer
- Volleyball

According to PIAA directory July 2015.
