= Woodlynde School =

Location
- 445 Upper Gulph Road; Strafford, Pennsylvania 19087-5498; United States

Information
- Type: Private, college-preparatory day school
- Motto: Ready for College. Ready for Life.
- Established: 1976
- NCES School ID: A0903306
- Head of school: Dr. Gregory Martin
- Teaching staff: 69.9 (on an FTE basis)
- Grades: KG–12
- Gender: Co-educational
- Enrollment: 268 (2017–18)
- Student to teacher ratio: 3.8
- Website: www.woodlynde.org

Woodlynde School is a KG–12 private, co-educational college-preparatory day school for students with learning differences in Strafford, Pennsylvania, United States. It was established in 1976.

== History ==
Woodlynde School was formed out of the ashes Booth School, (which shut in 1976). As children had no school to go to, previous parents and educators from Booth School decided they need a school. Gordon A. Hughes, Janet and Robert M. Hewes, III, and Arthur M. Tofani, Opened the doors to Woodlynde School on the old grounds of a former Episcopal diocesan estate. The school opened with only 40 students but started to grow by the leadership of first headmaster Jack Hughes.
