= Swenson Arts and Technology High School =

Coordinates: 40.091965°N 75.014°W

Swenson High School

Location
- 2750 Red Lion Road; Philadelphia, Pennsylvania 19114; United States

Information
- Type: Public high school
- Motto: "It's always sunny at Swenson!"
- Established: 1977
- School district: The School District of Philadelphia
- Principal: Judy Haughton
- Grades: 9th – 12th
- Enrollment: > 750
- Colors: Red, white, and blue
- Mascot: Lion
- Website: swenson.philasd.org

Swenson Arts and Technology High School (Swenson High School), formally known as "Swenson Skills Center", is a full-time Technical/Vocational high school located in the greater Northeast of Philadelphia, Pennsylvania. The school is located at 2750 Red Lion Road, just north of the Northeast Philadelphia Airport. The school is one of the few special admission high schools in the School District of Philadelphia. The school serves students from ninth through twelfth grade from all over the city, and has an approximate enrollment of about 800 students.
