= Littlestown, Pennsylvania =

Borough in Pennsylvania, US

- Borough
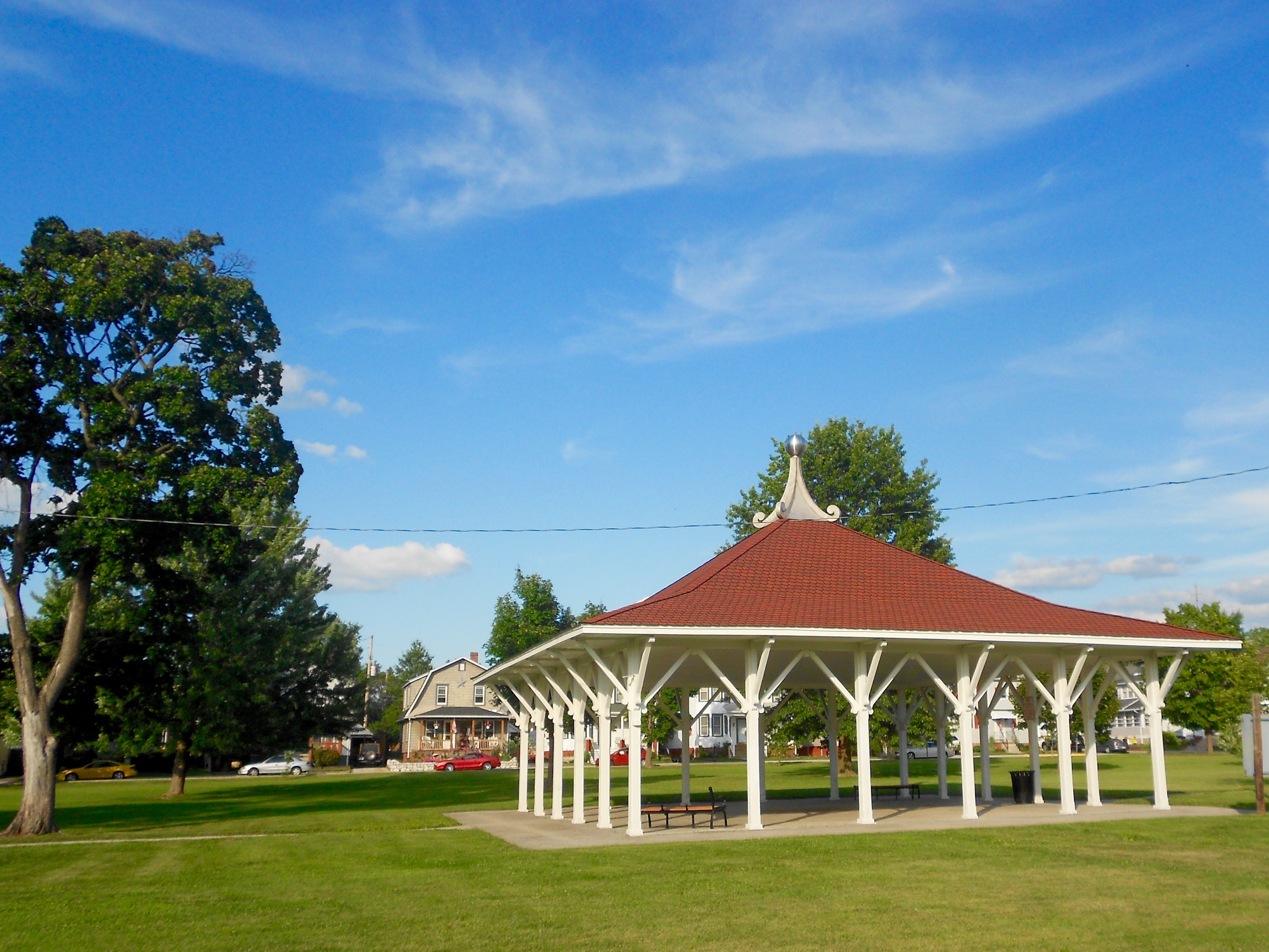
- Pavillon in Crouse Park

- Seal
- Motto(s): We're growing, one neighbor at a time
- Location in Adams County and the U.S. state of Pennsylvania.

- Location in Pennsylvania and the United States Littlestown (the United States)
- Coordinates: 39°44′37″N 77°05′21″W
- Country: United States
- State: Pennsylvania
- County: Adams
- Settled: 1765
- Incorporated: 1864

Government
  - Type: Borough Council
  - Mayor: Jennifer Beskid, EdD

Area
  - Total: 1.50 sq mi (3.89 km^{2})
  - Land: 1.50 sq mi (3.89 km^{2})
  - Water: 0 sq mi (0.00 km^{2})
- Elevation: 627 ft (191 m)

Population (2020)
  - Total: 4,782
  - Density: 3,181.9/sq mi (1,228.55/km^{2})
- Time zone: UTC-5 (Eastern (EST))
  - Summer (DST): UTC-4 (EDT)
- Zip Code: 17340
- Area codes: 717 and 223
- FIPS code: 42-43944
- Website: www.littlestownborough.org

Littlestown is a borough in Adams County, Pennsylvania, United States. The population was 4,782 at the 2020 census.

Originally laid out by Peter Klein in 1760, the town was first named Petersburg. German settlers in the area came to call the town Kleine Stedtle. In 1795, as confusion between the town and a neighboring town (also named Petersburg and now named York Springs) was growing, the town changed its name to Littlestown, an English translation of the German name Kleine Stedtle.

== Geography ==
Littlestown is located at 39°44′37″N 77°5′21″W (39.743749, -77.089240). According to the U.S. Census Bureau, the borough has a total area of 1.6 square miles (4.1 km^{2}), all land. Littlestown is surrounded by three larger towns, Hanover and Gettysburg in Pennsylvania and Westminster, Maryland, all within 20 miles (32 km) driving distance.

== Demographics ==
Historical population
Census	Pop.	Note	%±
1850	394		—
1860	702		78.2%
1870	847		20.7%
1880	913		7.8%
1890	991		8.5%
1900	1,118		12.8%
1910	1,347		20.5%
1920	1,552		15.2%
1930	2,001		28.9%
1940	2,463		23.1%
1950	2,635		7.0%
1960	2,756		4.6%
1970	3,026		9.8%
1980	2,870		−5.2%
1990	2,974		3.6%
2000	3,947		32.7%
2010	4,434		12.3%
2020	4,782		7.8%

=== 2020 census ===
As of the 2020 census, Littlestown had a population of 4,782. The median age was 39.7 years. 22.8% of residents were under the age of 18 and 20.5% of residents were 65 years of age or older. For every 100 females there were 95.0 males, and for every 100 females age 18 and over there were 90.3 males age 18 and over.

99.8% of residents lived in urban areas, while 0.2% lived in rural areas.

There were 1,977 households in Littlestown, of which 29.2% had children under the age of 18 living in them. Of all households, 47.2% were married-couple households, 15.9% were households with a male householder and no spouse or partner present, and 28.1% were households with a female householder and no spouse or partner present. About 27.7% of all households were made up of individuals and 12.7% had someone living alone who was 65 years of age or older.

There were 2,082 housing units, of which 5.0% were vacant. The homeowner vacancy rate was 1.1% and the rental vacancy rate was 5.9%.

Racial composition as of the 2020 census
Race	Number	Percent
White	4,321	90.4%
Black or African American	78	1.6%
American Indian and Alaska Native	10	0.2%
Asian	24	0.5%
Native Hawaiian and Other Pacific Islander	4	0.1%
Some other race	53	1.1%
Two or more races	292	6.1%
Hispanic or Latino (of any race)	168	3.5%

=== 2000 census ===
As of the census of 2000, there were 3,947 people, 1,586 households, and 1,113 families residing in the borough. The population density was 2,517.0 inhabitants per square mile (971.8/km^{2}). There were 1,692 housing units at an average density of 1,079.0 per square mile (416.6/km^{2}). The racial makeup of the borough was 97.26% White, 0.56% African American, 0.10% Native American, 0.43% Asian, 0.51% from other races, and 1.14% from two or more races. Hispanic or Latino of any race were 1.27% of the population.

There were 1,586 households, out of which 35.9% had children under the age of 18 living with them, 53.3% were married couples living together, 12.7% had a female householder with no husband present, and 29.8% were non-families. 24.8% of all households were made up of individuals, and 10.5% had someone living alone who was 65 years of age or older. The average household size was 2.49 and the average family size was 2.95.

In the borough, the population was spread out, with 27.7% under the age of 18, 7.6% from 18 to 24, 32.1% from 25 to 44, 18.5% from 45 to 64, and 14.1% who were 65 years of age or older. The median age was 34 years. For every 100 females there were 90.5 males. For every 100 females age 18 and over, there were 84.6 males. The median income for a household in the borough was $36,678, and the median income for a family was $42,261. Males had a median income of $31,055 versus $23,658 for females. The per capita income for the borough was $17,310. About 6.9% of families and 10.0% of the population were below the poverty line, including 12.2% of those under age 18 and 8.7% of those age 65 or over.

While the agricultural past of the town is still clear, it has begun to become a bedroom community for commuters working in Baltimore, Harrisburg and York.

== Education ==
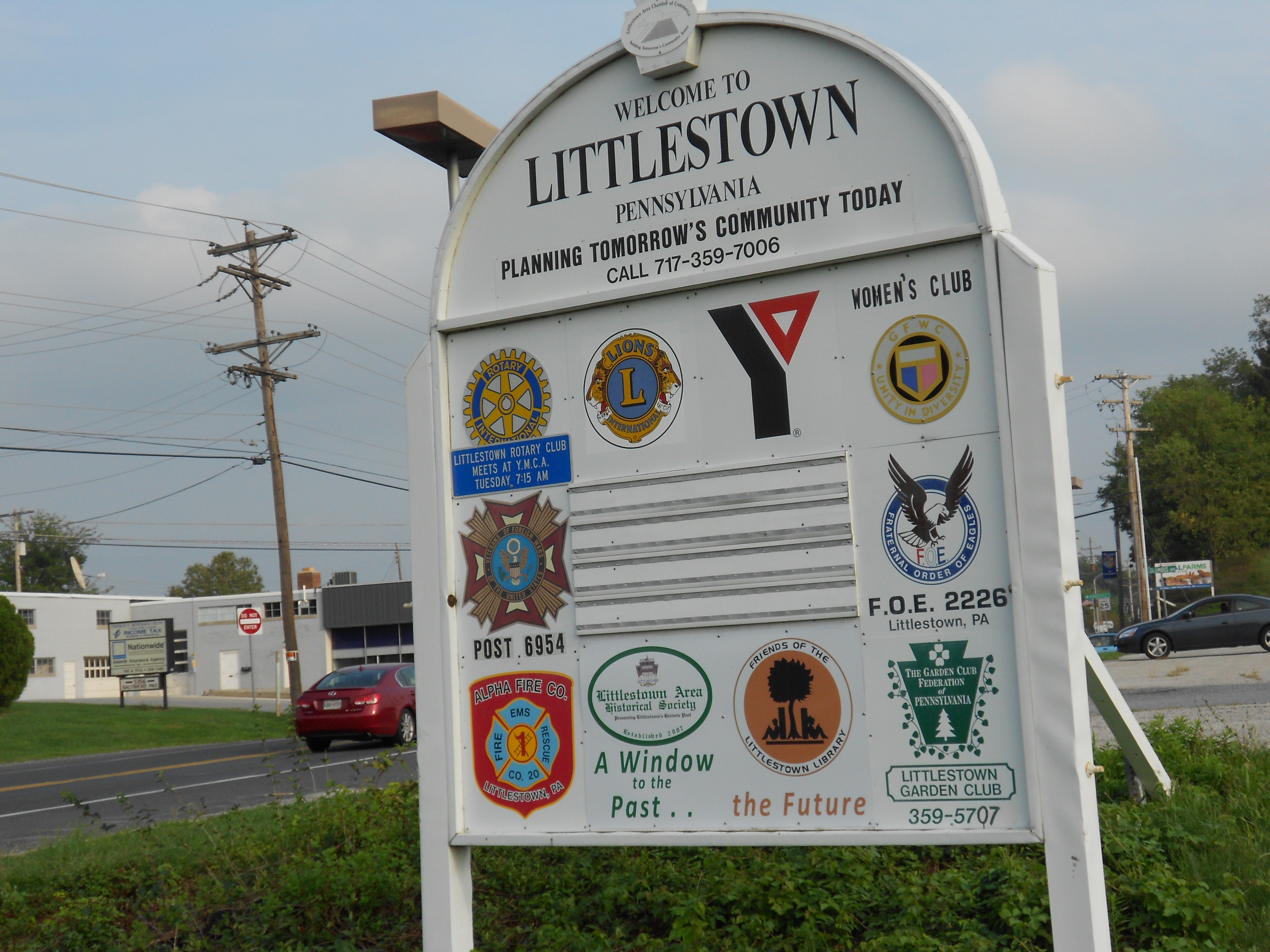

It is in the Littlestown Area School District.

There are three branches of the school district:

- Alloway Creek Elementary (K–5th),
- Maple Avenue Middle School (grades 6 to 8),
- Littlestown Senior High School (grades 9 to 12), home of the Thunderbolts.

This is outdated, the middle school and high school have been combined

== Recreation and parks ==
The borough contains Littlestown Community Park, and Crouse Park.

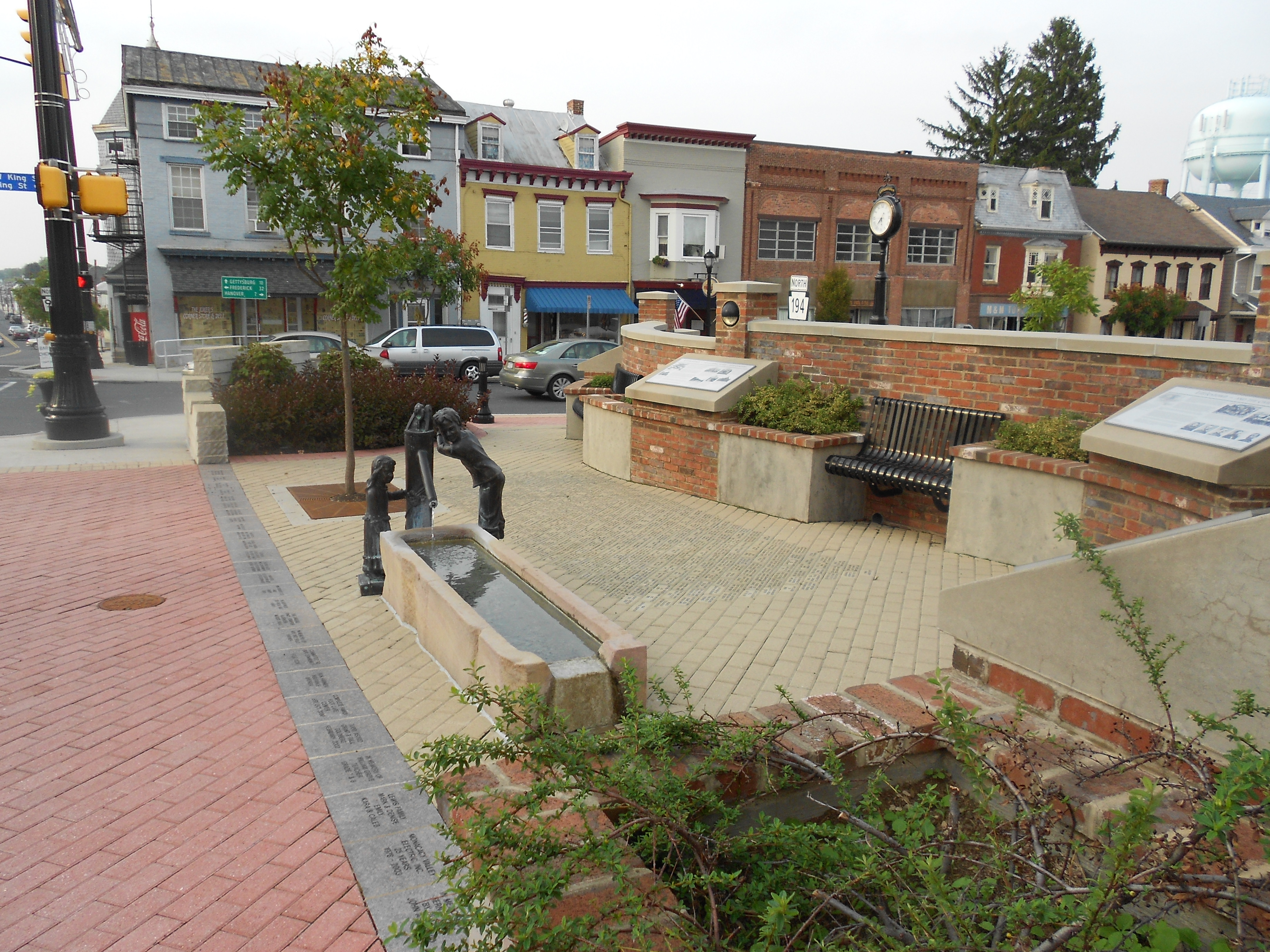
Littlestown History Plaza

== Notable people ==
- George Peter Deisert, fraktur artist
- Congressman Joseph A. Goulden
- Congressman James McSherry
- Stage actress/writer/dancer Myrtle Louise Stonesifer- King
- Escaped slave James W. C. Pennington
