= Hill Top Preparatory School =

Location
- 40.0157°N 75.3541°W

Information
- Founded: 1971
- Enrollment: 75-80 students
- Average class size: 6 students
- Athletics: Soccer; Cross Country; Basketball; Tennis; Golf; Bowling; Equestrian
- Annual tuition: $53,950 (Non-Boarding), $67,650 (Boarding)
- Website: www.hilltopprep.org

The Hill Top Preparatory School is a grade five through twelve preparatory day school for students with learning disabilities. It is located in Radnor Township, Pennsylvania, and has a Rosemont address.

== History ==
During the late 1960s, there were only a few private schools that educated children with learning disabilities and offered students the appropriate support and understanding. Elissa L. Fisher saw that many of these children had potential and worked to meet these needs appropriately by founding the Hill Top Preparatory School.

== Overall Mission ==
Through the years, Hill Top has offered students opportunities to learn and explore through their integration of technology, the promotion of activism and in the introduction of new ideas. Hill Top strives to arm students with the necessary tools and knowledge needed for transition to life after graduation.

=== COVID-19 ===
Due to the Coronavirus pandemic of 2020, Hill Top adjusted by adding a virtual learning option during the 2020-2021 school year to its traditional, in-person format. Classes were lengthened to give time for mask breaks, enabling students to have each class every other day, rather than every day. The Linden Halls, where most of the middle school's classes are held, were changed to one-way hallways, due to their narrowness. Most of the high school classes are in the middle school building, due to the larger number of students in high school and the larger-sized classrooms in the middle school building.

== Students with special needs ==
Hill Top has a wide variety of students, many of whom have learning disabilities and neural development disorders, including ADHD, ADD, autism, and epilepsy.

== Campus ==
The campus is located on the former site of the Booth School.

It currently has five buildings, two of which have been expanded. Two of the buildings are private residences. The other buildings are the mansion/Linden Hall, which holds a library, lunchrooms, classrooms, and offices. The middle school includes classrooms and science labs. The carriage house/gymnasium holds the athletic offices and art classrooms. There is also a gym located east of the carriage house. The long-unoccupied third floor of the mansion was converted into an apartment in 2007 after a massive renovation. Hill Top has recently added a renovation to the carriage house to create a multi-purpose creative space that will further help promote action-based learning.
