= Lehigh Valley Academy =

Lehigh Valley Academy Regional Charter School
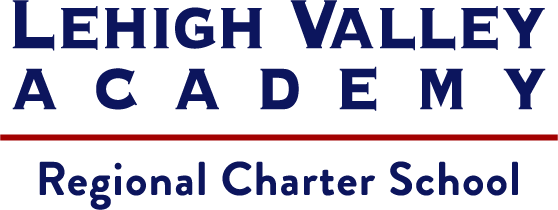

Location
- 2040 Avenue C Bethlehem, Pennsylvania 18017; United States; 40°39′28″N 75°25′11″W

Information
- School type: K-12 charter school
- Established: 2002
- School district: Bethlehem Area School District
- NCES School ID: 420009800635
- Grades: K-12
- Enrollment: 1,847 (2023-2024)
- Student to teacher ratio: 11.10
- Campus size: >200,000 square feet
- Website: https://www.lvacademy.org/

Lehigh Valley Academy Regional Charter School (LVA) is an K–12 school that participates in the International Baccalaureate located in Bethlehem, Pennsylvania. Although located within Bethlehem Area School District, LVA is a charter school. LVA serves students from 16 surrounding school districts. In the school year of 2023–2024, LVA had an enrollment of 1,847 students.
