= Littlestown Senior High School =

Location
- 200 East Myrtle Street; Littlestown, Pennsylvania 17340-1140; United States; 39°44′58″N 77°5′5″W

Information
- Type: Public
- Established: 1962
- Superintendent: Al Moyer (Interim)
- Principal: Nathan Becker
- Teaching staff: 47.17 (FTE)
- Grades: 9th - 12th
- Enrollment: 537 (2023–2024)
- Student to teacher ratio: 11.38
- Campus type: Rural
- Color: Blue Gold
- Nickname: The Thunderbolts
- Newspaper: Bolt Buzz
- Website: www.lasd.k12.pa.us/o/lhs

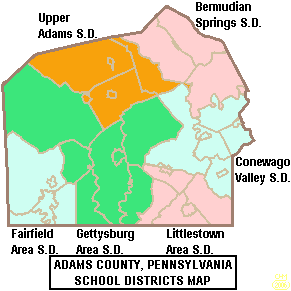
Map of Adams County, Pennsylvania school districts

Littlestown Senior High School is a small, rural public high school located in Littlestown, Pennsylvania, United States. It is part of the Littlestown Area School District. In 2013, Littlestown Senior High School enrollment was reported at 605 pupils.

The current principal is Nathan Becker. The school's colors are blue and gold, and the mascot is the Thunderbolt.

== Athletics ==
Throughout the history of Littlestown Senior High School, athletic programs have been emphasized through the years. Current athletic programs of the school include:

=== Boys ===
- Baseball
- Basketball
- Cross country
- Football
- Outdoor track and field
- Soccer
- Tennis
- Wrestling

=== Girls ===
- Basketball
- Cheer
- Cross country
- Field hockey
- Outdoor track and field
- Softball
- Tennis
- Volleyball
- Soccer
