= Lycoming Career and Technology Center =

Coordinates: 41.240149°N 76.731120°W

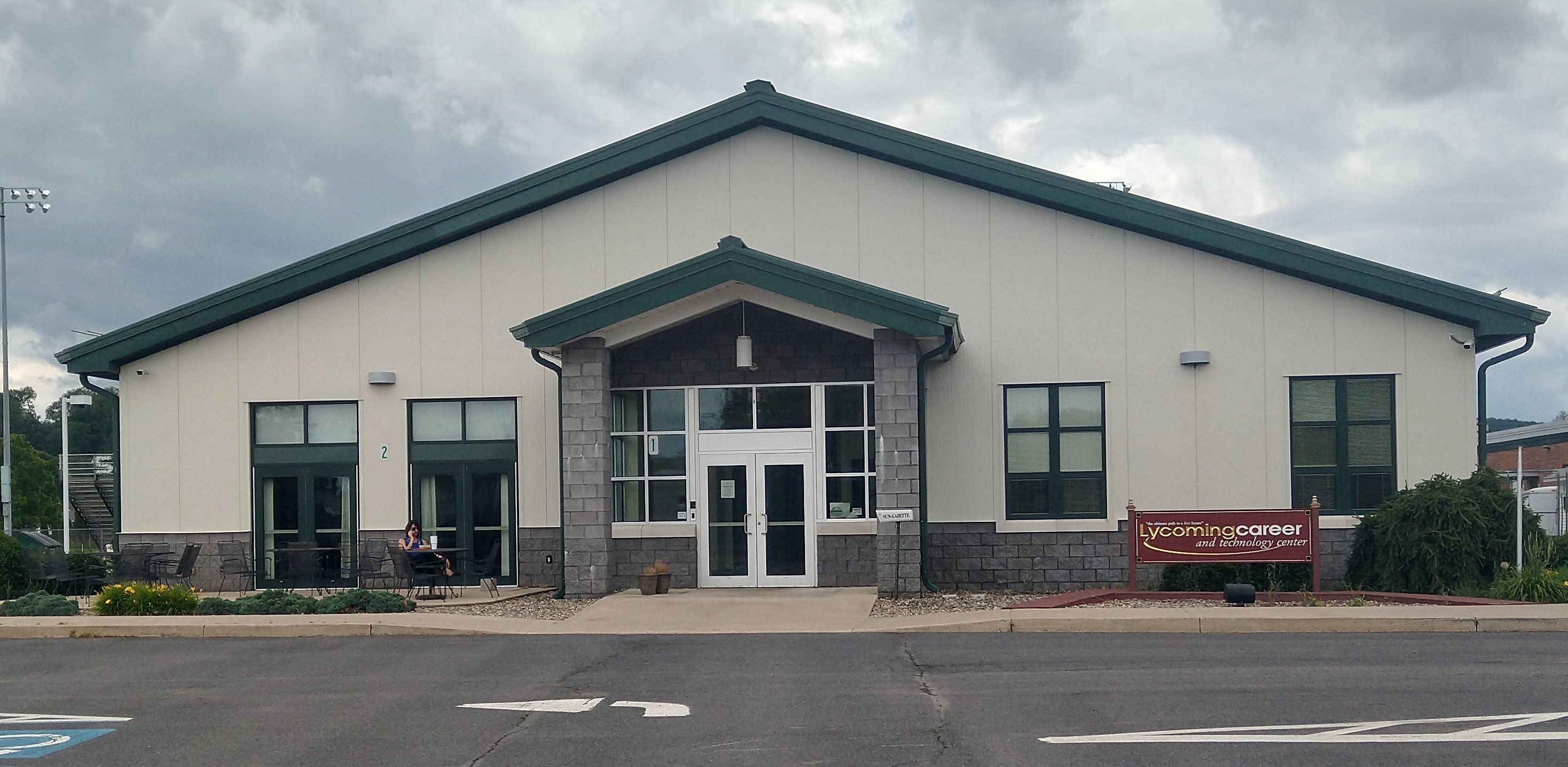
- Lycoming Career and Technology Center in June 2021

Location
- 293 Cemetery Street; Hughesville, Lycoming County, Pennsylvania 17737-1020; United States

Information
- Type: Public
- Opened: May 15, 1998
- Dean: Walter Reed
- Faculty: 9 (2013), 10 (2011-12)
- Grades: 10–12
- Age: 15 years old to 18 years old
- Enrollment: 303 pupils (2015),
- Language: English
- Website: https://www.lycoctc.org/

Lycoming Career and Technology Center is a small suburban, public, career training center located in Hughesville, Pennsylvania. The School serves the residents of six local public school districts: East Lycoming School District, Loyalsock Township School District, Montoursville Area School District, Muncy School District, Benton Area School District, and Warrior Run School District. Lycoming Career and Technology Center is located on the campus of Hughesville Junior Senior High School in the East Lycoming School District. Non-public school students who live in one of the six participating districts are given the opportunity to attend the school. Lycoming Career and Technology Center is one of 80 public technology schools operating in Pennsylvania.

Lycoming Career and Technology Center primarily offers three-year courses. Students attend their home school for basic academics required for graduation, and travel to campus during the day to attend their chosen program. Students attend a separate graduation ceremony on center grounds alongside that of their home school.

== Programs ==
Lycoming Career and Technology Center offers nine programs for students to enroll in. These include:

- Culinary Arts
- Criminal Justice
- Pre-Nursing and Health Sciences
- Early Childhood Education
- Computer Systems Technology
- Automotive Technology
- Diesel Technology
- Welding Technology
- Construction Trades

Students take the appropriate NOCTI exams offered by the National Occupational Competency Testing Institute. They can also participate in the annual SkillsUSA competitions.
