= Muncy Junior-Senior High School =

Muncy Junior Senior High School
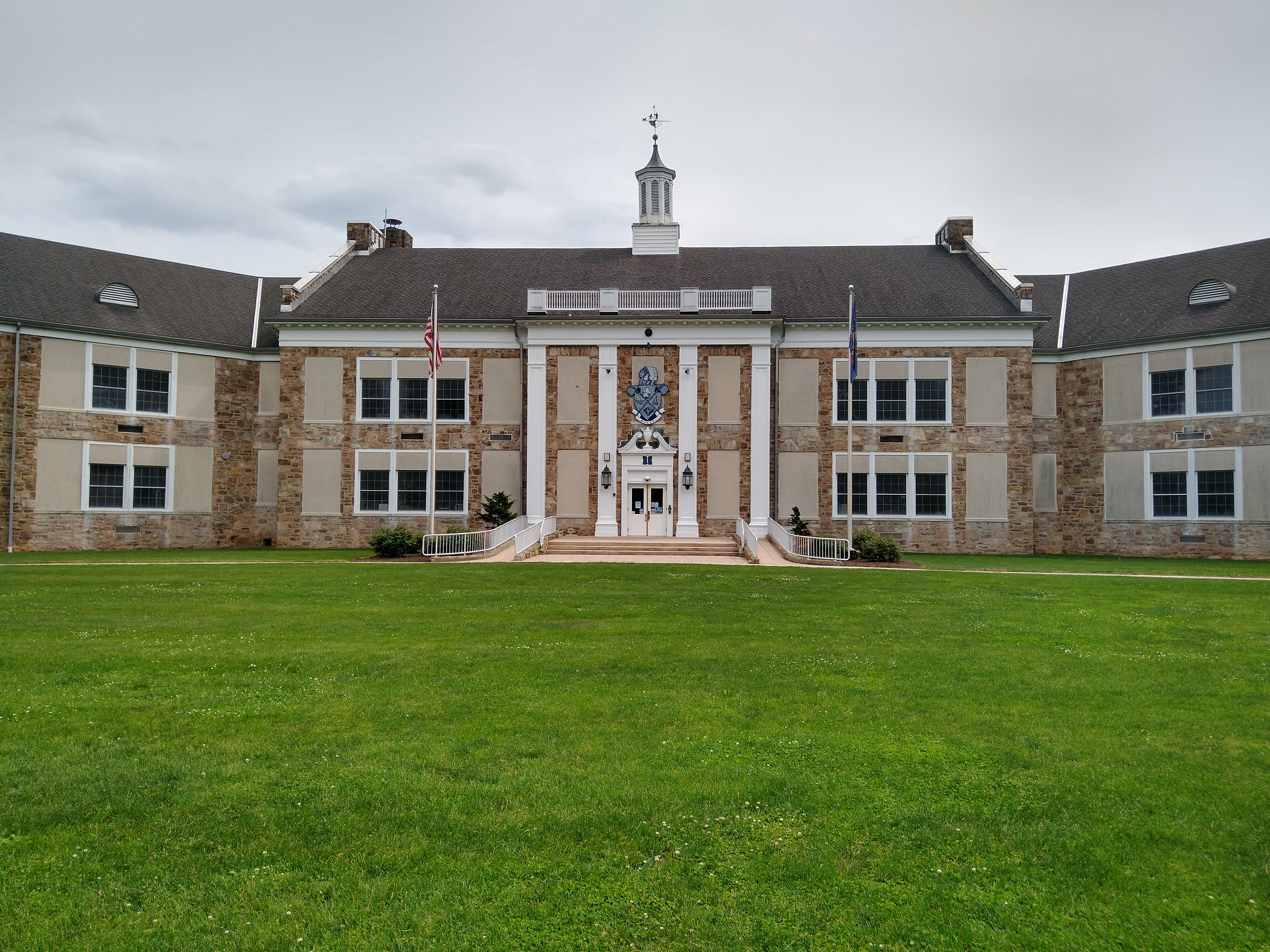
- Muncy Junior-Senior High School in May 2021

Location
- 200 West Penn Street; Muncy, Lycoming County, Pennsylvania, Pennsylvania 17756-1346; United States; 41.2015°N 76.7904°W

Information
- Type: Public
- School district: Muncy School District
- Principal: Timothy Welliver
- Enrollment: 472 (2024-2025)
- Colors: Blue and white
- Nickname: Indians
- Feeder schools: Ward L. Myers Elementary School
- Website: https://www.muncysd.org/jr-sr-high-school/

Muncy Junior Senior High School is located at 200 W Penn Street, Muncy, Pennsylvania. In 2022-23, Muncy Junior Senior High School reported an enrollment of 472 pupils in grades 7th through 12th. It is part of the Muncy School District.

High school students from grades 10-12 can attend the Lycoming Career and Technology Center for training and education in various career paths. The Muncy School District contracts with the BLaST Intermediate Unit #17 for services such as psychological testing as well as occupational and physical therapy services.

== Extracurriculars ==
The Muncy School District offers a wide variety of clubs, activities and sports.

=== Sports ===
The district funds:

Boys

- Baseball - AA
- Basketball - AA
- Football - A
- Soccer - A
- Tennis - AA
- Wrestling - AA

Girls

- Basketball - A
- Field hockey - A
- Soccer - A
- Softball - A
- Tennis - AA

Junior high school sports

Boys

- Basketball
- Football
- Wrestling

Girls

- Basketball
- Field hockey
- Softball

- According to PIAA directory July 2016
