= Mike Mussina =

American baseball player (born 1968)

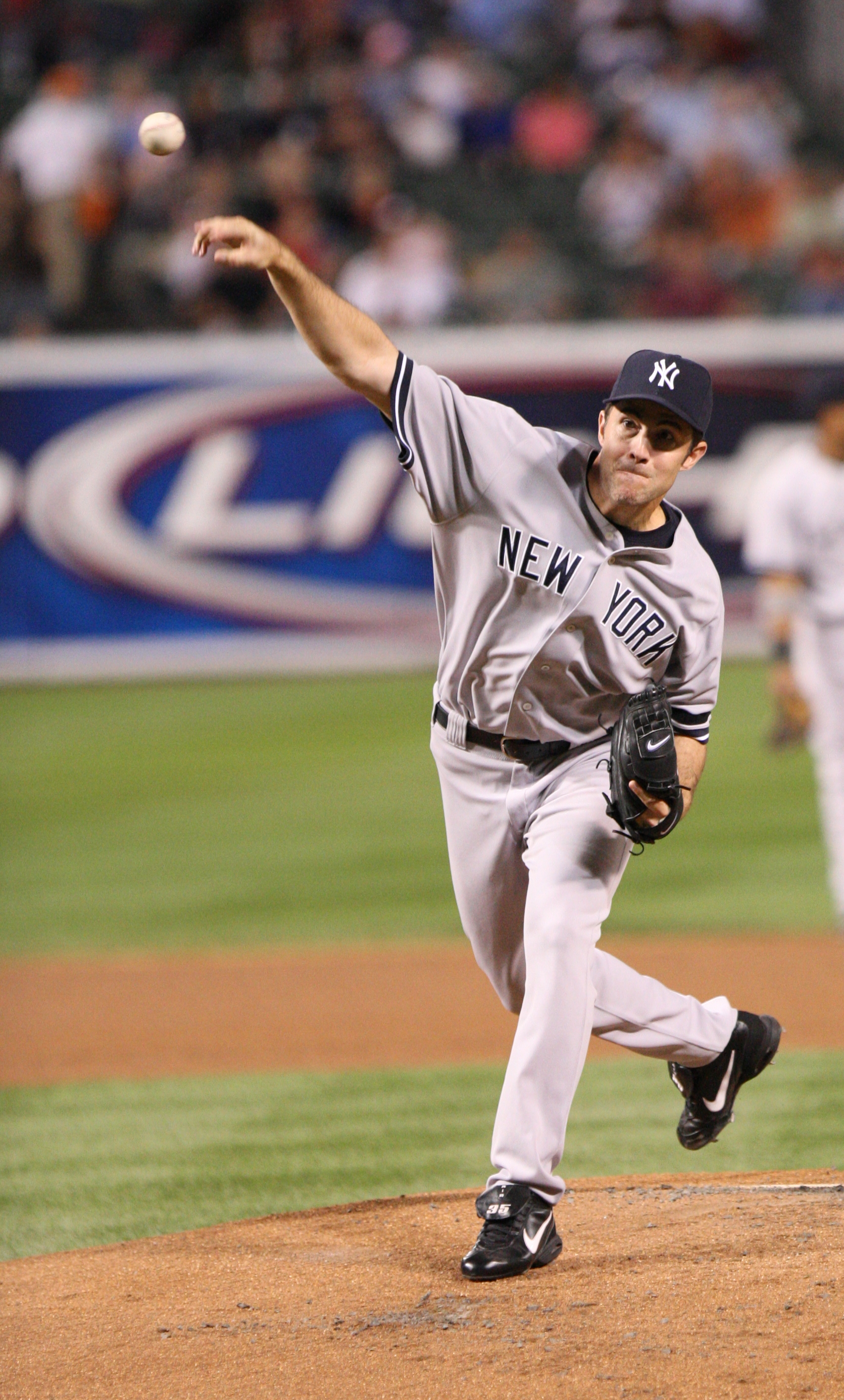
- Mussina with the New York Yankees in 2007
- Pitcher
- Born: December 8, 1968 (age 57); Williamsport, Pennsylvania, U.S.
- Batted: Left Threw: Right

MLB debut
- August 4, 1991, for the Baltimore Orioles

Last MLB appearance
- September 28, 2008, for the New York Yankees

MLB statistics
- Win–loss record: 270–153
- Earned run average: 3.68
- Strikeouts: 2,813
- Stats at Baseball Reference

Teams
- Baltimore Orioles (1991–2000); New York Yankees (2001–2008)

Career highlights and awards
- 5× All-Star (1992–1994, 1997, 1999); 7× Gold Glove Award (1996–1999, 2001, 2003, 2008); MLB wins leader (1995); Baltimore Orioles Hall of Fame

Member of the National

Baseball Hall of Fame
- Induction: 2019
- Vote: 76.7% (sixth ballot)
Medals
Men's baseball
Representing United States
World Junior Baseball Championship
Bronze medal – third place	1986 Windsor	Team

Michael Cole Mussina (born December 8, 1968), nicknamed "Moose", is an American former baseball starting pitcher who played 18 seasons in Major League Baseball (MLB) for the Baltimore Orioles (1991–2000) and the New York Yankees (2001–2008). In 2019, Mussina was elected to the Baseball Hall of Fame.

Mussina spent his entire career in the American League East, won at least 11 games in 17 consecutive seasons – an American League record – and recorded a career .638 winning percentage. Among pitchers, he ranks 23rd in strikeouts (2,813), and 23rd all-time in pitching Wins Above Replacement (82.9), 33rd in all-time wins (270), 33rd in games started (535), 66th in innings pitched (3,562.2). A five-time All-Star and seven-time Gold Glove winner, Mussina's consistency resulted in six top-five finishes in the voting for his league's Cy Young Award.

== Early life ==
Mussina was born on December 8, 1968, in Williamsport, Pennsylvania. At Montoursville Area High School in Montoursville, Pennsylvania he had a 24–4 win–loss record with a 0.87 earned run average (ERA) for the school's baseball team. In the summer, he played for the Montoursville American Legion Baseball team. While playing baseball in college, he also played in the summertime for Jerseytown, Pennsylvania of the North Branch Baseball League of PA (NBBL).

Mussina also excelled in the sports of football and basketball as his records remain near the top of Montoursville High School's all-time boys' basketball career scoring leaders with over 1,000 points scored. An outstanding placekicker, he received an offer to play college football from Penn State University head coach Joe Paterno, but he turned down the offer to focus on playing baseball. He also received a Division 1 college basketball scholarship offer from Vanderbilt University.

As a high school senior, Mussina just missed being the valedictorian of his graduating class. According to some reports, he intentionally came up short to avoid delivering a commencement speech.

Mussina was drafted by the Baltimore Orioles in 1987 but chose to attend college at Stanford University rather than sign.

== College career ==
Mussina enrolled at Stanford University, where he played college baseball for the Stanford Cardinal baseball team. In three years with the Cardinal, Mussina compiled a 31–16 record with a 3.89 ERA. He made two College World Series appearances and was selected as an All-American. His junior year in 1990 was his best, finishing 14–5 with a 3.50 ERA over 149 innings, before being drafted again by the Baltimore Orioles, this time as a first round pick (20th overall).

Mussina graduated from Stanford in 1990 with a degree in economics. He is a member of the Delta Tau Delta fraternity.

== Professional career ==
=== Draft and minor leagues ===
Mussina made his professional debut with the Class AA Hagerstown Suns of the Eastern League in 1990. In the minor leagues, Mussina posted a 2.38 ERA in 189 innings.

=== Baltimore Orioles (1991–2000) ===
==== 1992–1995 ====
In 1992, Mussina's first full season with the Orioles, he finished with an 18–5 record and a 2.54 ERA in 241 innings. His .783 win–loss percentage led the league, and his 1.79 BB/9 was second best behind Chris Bosio. His four shutouts were tied for second in the league behind only Boston's Roger Clemens. He finished fourth in the American League Cy Young Award voting, and pitched one perfect inning in the 1992 All-Star Game.

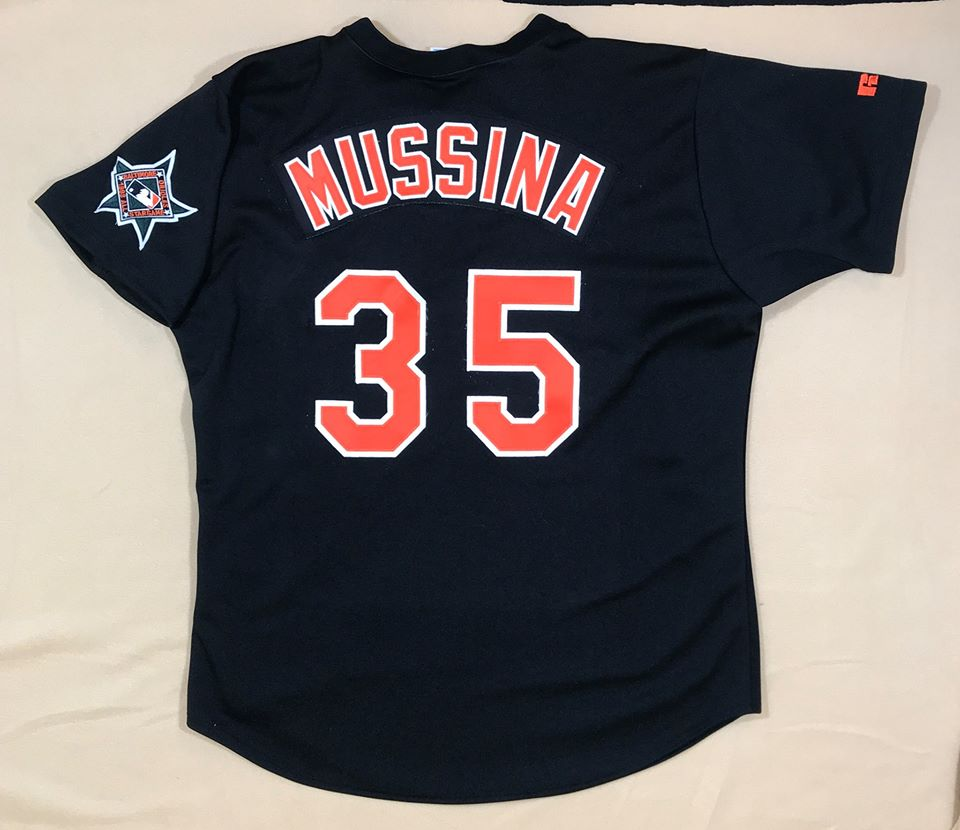
1993 Baltimore Orioles #35 Mike Mussina alternate jersey

Mussina struggled in 1993 due to shoulder soreness, which placed him on the disabled list (DL) from July 22 to August 19. Nonetheless, he won 14 games while posting the seventh best winning percentage in the American League. Mussina also allowed 83 earned runs in only 167.2 innings of work for a 4.46 ERA while striking out 117 batters. He was voted onto the All-Star team, however he did not pitch in the game. There was a controversial incident toward the end of the game when Mussina chose to warm up in the bullpen, despite the fact AL manager Cito Gaston had told him that he would not enter the game. Orioles fans believed Mussina was warming up in preparation to come in and pitch the ninth inning, and when Gaston put Duane Ward in to pitch the ninth inning, the fans at Camden Yards spent the rest of the game chanting "We Want Mike" and booing Gaston very loudly, as the popular slogan "Cito Sucks" was born in Baltimore. The slogan could be seen on T-shirts or heard even years later in Baltimore any time the visiting Blue Jays came to town. Gaston was never treated well by Baltimore fans for the rest of his managerial career and he was subject to death threats for not pitching Mussina in the game. For his part, Mussina said he was just getting his work in, as he was scheduled to throw that day, and it was apparent Gaston did require his services. Mussina returned from the DL in August against the Texas Rangers, only to have the Orioles shut him down three weeks later in mid-September due to lower back pain.

Mussina returned to form in 1994, but a player's strike cut his season short, causing him to finish with only 16 wins and 99 strikeouts in 176.1 innings of work. Mussina finished tied for second in the league in wins, and his 3.06 ERA placed him fourth. He was selected to his third consecutive All-Star Game and pitched one inning, giving up one hit while striking out one batter. Mussina finished fourth in voting for that year's American League Cy Young Award.

In 1995, Mussina started and won Cal Ripken's record-breaking 2,131st consecutive game on September 6, 1995. Mussina led the league with 19 wins and had one of his finest statistical seasons. He struck out 158 batters in 221.2 innings, allowing only 81 earned runs for an ERA of 3.29. Mussina led the league with four shutouts, and he also allowed a league-low 2.03 BB/9, while his 1.069 WHIP was second only to Seattle's Randy Johnson. Despite his excellent season, Mussina was not elected to that year's All-Star Game, and finished fifth in the American League Cy Young Award voting.

==== 1996–2000 ====
In 1996, Mussina won 19 games and set a new career high of 243.1 innings. His league-leading 36 games started were also a career high. 18 of his starts that year were quality starts. In his last start of the season, the Orioles bullpen blew a late-inning lead, costing Mussina a 20-win season. Mussina also won his first Gold Glove that year.

Mussina did not start the Opening Day game in 1997 due to elbow tendonitis. He had been the Opening Day starter for the Orioles every year since 1993. Mussina finished the season with a 15–8 record, and his 3.20 ERA was fourth best in the league. In addition, his 218 strikeouts were a career high and established a franchise record. Mussina was again selected for the All-Star team but did not appear in the game. He finished sixth in the American League Cy Young Award voting and won his second consecutive Gold Glove. In the 1997 American League Championship Series he pitched 15 innings over two starts, allowing one run and four hits, and striking out 25—an ALCS record at the time. However, the Orioles failed to score in both of his starts, and Mussina ended up receiving no-decisions for each.

Mussina's 1998 season was punctuated by two separate trips to the DL, including for injury resultant from when a ball hit by Sandy Alomar Jr. struck him on the face and fractured his nose. Mussina still won 13 games and post a 3.49 ERA, with 175 strikeouts in 206.1 innings. His strikeout-to-walk ratio was good for second in the league. Mussina won his third consecutive Gold Glove with a perfect 1.000 fielding percentage out of 50 total chances. On April 11, Mussina struck out Detroit's Bip Roberts for his 1,000th career strikeout.

In 1999, he finished second in the league with 18 wins, and his 3.50 ERA and .720 win–loss percentage were good for third. Mussina struck out 172 batters in 203.2 innings while walking just 52, for a 3.31 K/BB ratio. He was selected as an All-Star and pitched one inning. Mussina finished second in the American League Cy Young Award voting that year behind Pedro Martínez. He committed just one error out of 61 total chances and won his fourth consecutive Gold Glove, further cementing his reputation as one of the top defensive pitchers in baseball.

In 2000, Mussina recorded his first and only losing season, going 11–15. However, he did not pitch as badly as his record suggests, as he allowed 100 earned runs in a league-leading 237.2 innings for a 3.79 ERA. He struck out 210 batters while allowing 44 walks. Opponents batted just .255 off him. He finished sixth in voting for the Cy Young Award that year.

=== New York Yankees ===
Following the 2000 season, Mussina decided to leave the Orioles via free agency. He signed a six-year, $88.5 million contract with the New York Yankees on November 30, 2000.

==== 2001–2004 ====
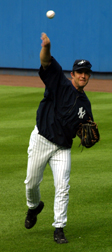
Mussina with the Yankees in 2002

Mussina finished the 2001 season with a 17–11 record. He was second in the league in ERA (3.15), strikeouts (214), shutouts (3), and strikeout/walk ratio (5.10), and fifth in strikeouts/9 IP (8.42) and complete games (4). Mussina pitched seven shutout innings in Game 3 of the 2001 American League Division Series and the Yankees went on to win the game 1–0, and eventually the series, becoming the only team to win a division series after losing the first two games at home. Mussina started Games 1 and 5 of the 2001 World Series against the Arizona Diamondbacks, posting an 0–1 record with a 4.09 ERA in 11 innings pitched.

In 2002, Mussina was second in the AL in walks/9 IP (1.65), third in strikeouts (182) and strikeouts/9 IP (7.60), eighth in wins (18), and ninth in walks/9 IP (2.00). He held batters to a .198 batting average when the game was tied.

In 2003, Mussina was third in the league in strikeouts/9 IP (8.18) and strikeout/walk ratio (4.88), fourth in strikeouts (195) and walks/9 IP (1.68), fifth in wins (17), and eighth in ERA (3.40). He held batters to a .190 batting average when there were two outs and runners in scoring position. During Game 7 of the 2003 ALCS, Mussina authored one of the greatest clutch pitching performances of all time. With the Yankees trailing Boston 4–0, Mussina made the first relief appearance of his career. With runners on the corners and nobody out, Mussina struck out Jason Varitek before inducing Johnny Damon to hit into a double play. Mussina went on to pitch 2 more scoreless innings and kept the Yankees within striking distance in a game they later came back to win.

In 2004, plagued by a series of injuries, Mussina ended the year with a 12–9 record and a 4.59 ERA. He was fourth in the league in strikeouts (195), and eighth in walks/9 IP (2.19).

==== 2005–2008 ====
In 2005, Mussina finished with a 13–8 record and a 4.41 ERA. He was seventh in the AL in strikeouts/9 IP (7.11).

In 2006, he ended the season with a 15–7 record. He was second in the league in OBP against (.279), third in the American League in walks/9 IP (1.60; a career-best), batting average against (.241), and strikeout/walk ratio (4.91), fourth in ERA (3.51), sixth in win–loss percentage (.682). He fanned Cody Ross to reach the 2,500 strikeout mark on June 25. Mussina also became the first pitcher in American League history to win 10 or more games for 15 consecutive seasons.

On November 20, 2006, Mussina and the Yankees reached a preliminary agreement, pending a physical, on a two-year, $23 million contract. Earlier in the off-season the Yankees declined the one-year, $17 million option on Mussina's previous contract. Under that back-loaded six-year, $88.5 million contract, Mussina earned $19 million in each of the last two seasons.

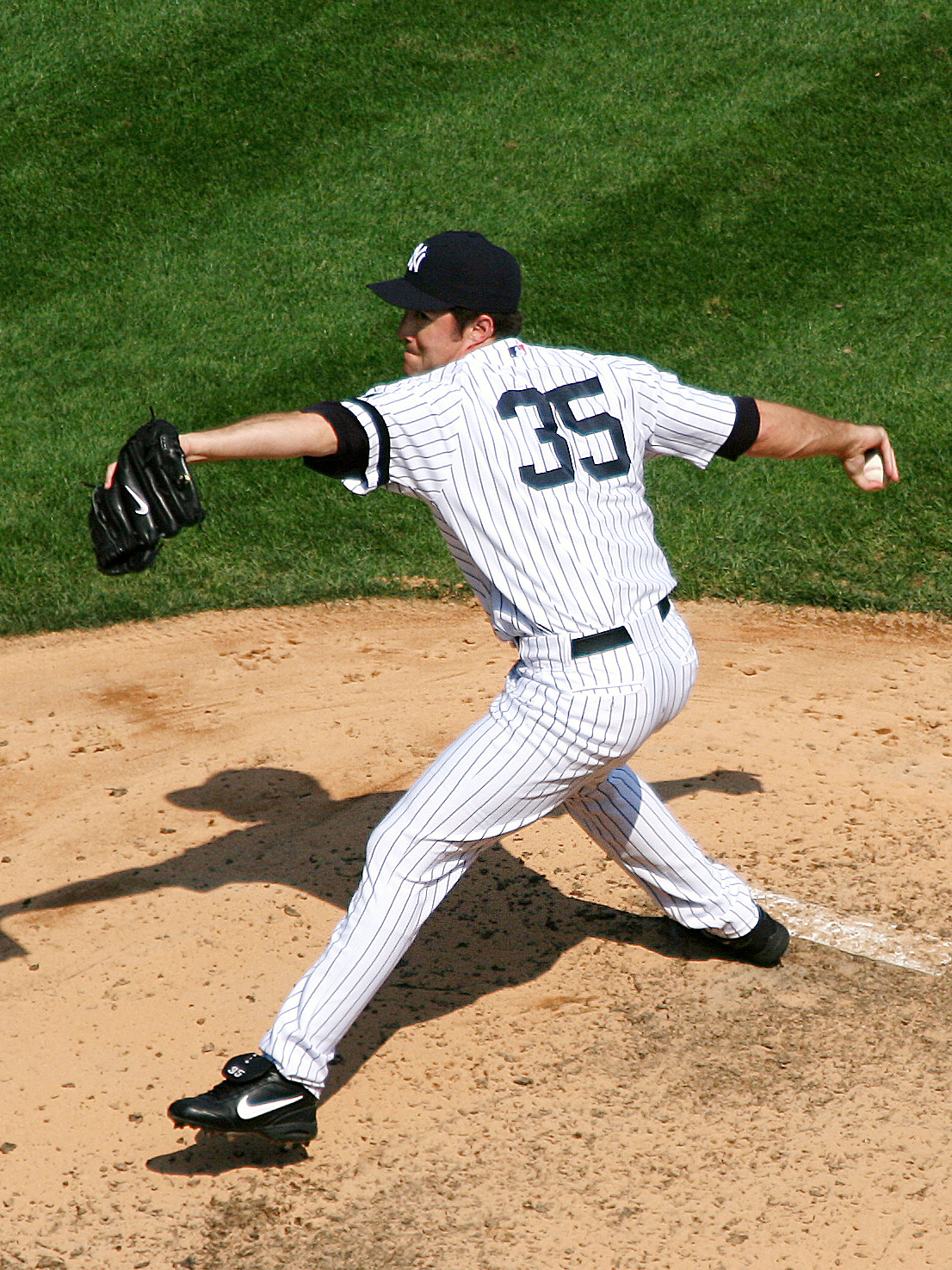
Mussina with the Yankees in 2007

In 2007, Mussina became just the ninth player to win 100 games with two different teams—he had won 147 with Baltimore. However, with the Yankees locked in a tight pennant race, Mussina struggled and temporarily lost his spot in the rotation to prospect Ian Kennedy. After just one relief appearance, (the first of his regular season career), Mussina returned as a starter, going 3–0 in his final four starts to end with 11–10 record and a career-high 5.15 ERA. The '07 season for Mussina and Mets' pitcher Tom Glavine was the subject of a 2008 book by John Feinstein, Living on the Black: Two Pitchers, Two Teams, One Season to Remember, showcasing a pivotal season for two New York City pitchers as Mussina nailed down milestone career win #250 with the Yankees and Glavine earned win #300 with the cross-town Mets.

In 2008, Mussina started his eighth season with the Yankees as a much-needed veteran of an inexperienced rotation. The year began with difficulty reminiscent of 2007, and many noted a sharp decline in his pitch velocity. Owner Hank Steinbrenner suggested that Mussina should "learn how to pitch like Jamie Moyer", and no longer rely so much on his fastball. Although that remark was widely interpreted as a slight, Mussina joked in response that he could not pitch like Moyer because he did not throw left-handed, and afterwards he excelled, going 9–1 in his subsequent 11 starts. On June 14, he recorded his 10th win of the season, extending his American League record to 17 consecutive seasons with at least 10 wins. On September 18, Mussina notched his 18th victory of the season and led the Yankees to a 9–2 victory over the first place White Sox in his final start at Yankee Stadium. On September 28, he won 20 games for the first time at the age of 39, with a 6–2 win over the Boston Red Sox at Fenway Park, becoming the oldest first-time 20 game winner in MLB history. He finished 20–9 with a 3.37 ERA. His 67.6% first-strike-percentage was the highest among major league starters.

Mussina would later finish second to Cleveland Indians pitcher Cliff Lee in the voting for American League comeback player of the year honors. On November 6, he was awarded his seventh career Gold Glove Award, and the third in his career with the Yankees. He would later finish behind Lee again in the balloting for the 2008 AL Cy Young Award. Mussina's sixth-place finish was his best since 2001.

Mussina officially announced his retirement on November 20, 2008. Mussina is the first pitcher to retire following a 20-victory season since Hall of Famer Sandy Koufax in 1966.

== Near-perfect games ==
Mussina pitched several near-perfect games throughout his career:

- On July 17, 1992, he retired the first 12 Texas Rangers before surrendering a double to Kevin Reimer. Mussina retired the final 15 batters he faced for a one-hit 8–0 shutout.
- On May 30, 1997, he retired the first 25 Cleveland Indians before surrendering a single to Sandy Alomar Jr. with one out in the ninth. Mussina struck out the last two batters for a one-hit 3–0 shutout.
- On August 4, 1998, he retired the first 23 Detroit Tigers he faced before surrendering a double to Frank Catalanotto with two outs in the eighth. Mussina gave up another hit in the eventual two hit 4–0 shutout.
- On August 1, 2000, he tossed a one-hitter against the Minnesota Twins.
- On September 2, 2001, he retired the first 26 Boston Red Sox he faced; he then ran pinch-hitter Carl Everett (batting for Joe Oliver) to a 1-and-2 count before Everett blooped a single to left-center. Mussina then retired leadoff man Trot Nixon on a grounder, striking out 13 batters in a one-hit 1–0 shutout. The losing pitcher was David Cone—the pitcher of the last perfect game at the time, on July 18, 1999. Although Mussina did not achieve perfection, James Buckley Jr. considered it special enough to include an appendix chapter about it in his 2002 book, Perfect: The Inside Story of Baseball's Sixteen Perfect Games.

== Other career achievements ==
- Seven-time Gold Glove award winner
- Placed in the top five of voting for the Cy Young Award six times
- 1994 Baseball America First-Team American League All-Star starting pitcher
- 1999 Baseball America Second-Team American League All-Star starting pitcher
- Led AL in win–loss percentage (.783) in 1992
- Led AL in wins (19), walks/9IP (2.03) and shutouts (4) in 1995
- Led AL in games started (36) in 1996
- Led AL in innings (237 2/3) in 2000
- Reached the 2001 and 2003 World Series with the New York Yankees
- Won 15 games in a season 11 times
- One 20-win season (2008), two 19-win seasons, three 18-win seasons, and two 17-win seasons

== Postseason performance ==
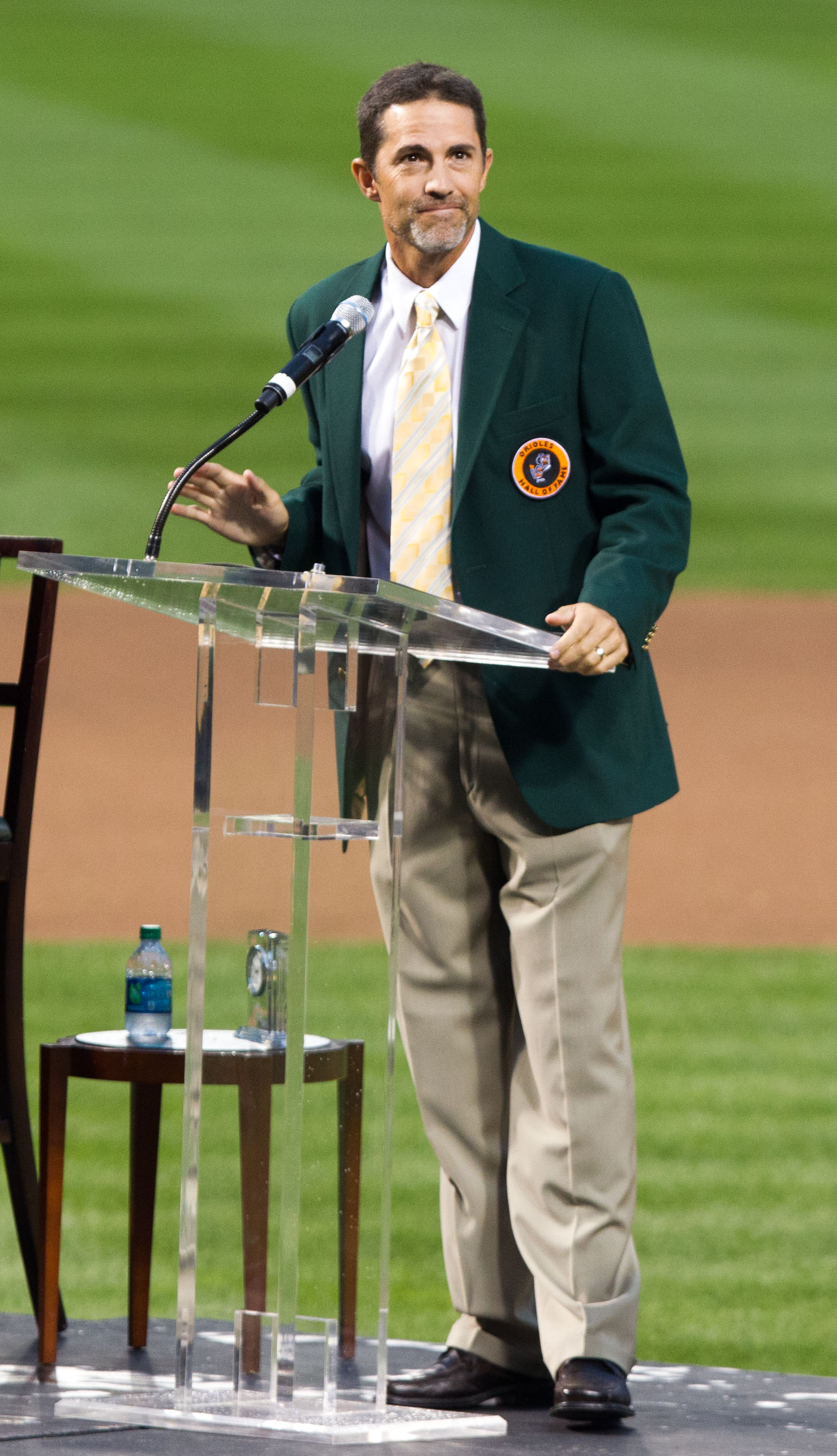
Mussina during the Baltimore Orioles Hall of Fame induction ceremony in 2012

Mussina collected an overall 7–8 record and 3.42 ERA, with 145 strikeouts in 23 career postseason games. His finest postseason occurred in 1997 for the Orioles, when in four games he went 2–0 with a 1.24 ERA in 29 innings pitched while allowing 11 hits, four earned runs, seven walks and 41 strikeouts. Notably, he twice outdueled Seattle Mariners ace Randy Johnson in head-to-head matchups during the ALDS. A feature on The Washington Post's website ranked his performance the sixth-most memorable moment at Camden Yards.

== Pitching style ==
Early in his career, Mussina's arsenal included a four-seam fastball that topped out at 95 mph, a two-seam fastball, a slider, a changeup, and a plus knuckle-curve. He was always a finesse pitcher, and coming up through the Orioles' organization, he was often compared to Jim Palmer. He received praise for the ability to make in-game adjustments to compensate for days when he was not at his best.

Mussina's prolonged success was also the result of his ability to make adjustments. He added a splitter to his repertoire and replaced his knuckle-curve with a more conventional curveball. He became more skilled at changing speeds with his breaking pitches and using different arm angles to confuse batters as well as to compensate for the diminishing speed of his fastball.

During spring training in 2006, Yankees catcher Jorge Posada noticed the unique grip Mussina used for his changeup and promptly hit a home run off it during an intra-squad game. Posada alerted Mussina to the tip-off, and he adjusted the grip. This new changeup was difficult for batters to recognize and was considered a main reason for his success that season.

Mussina's remarkable results in 2008 were attributed to changes in pitching style. While in the past he was known for painting the outside corner of the plate with a mid-90s four-seam fastball, he began to work on both sides of the plate with his diminished upper-80s fastball. Additionally, when throwing the fastball, he often used the two-seam grip, which gives the ball late breaking motion. Despite his lower fastball velocity, Mussina maintained a significant differential in pitch speed by also lowering the velocity of his changeup. In addition to those more obvious changes, Craig Brown of The Hardball Times also attributed Mussina's renaissance to excellent control, noting that he was walking fewer batters than ever before and was becoming a ground-ball pitcher for the first time in his career.

== Hall of Fame ==
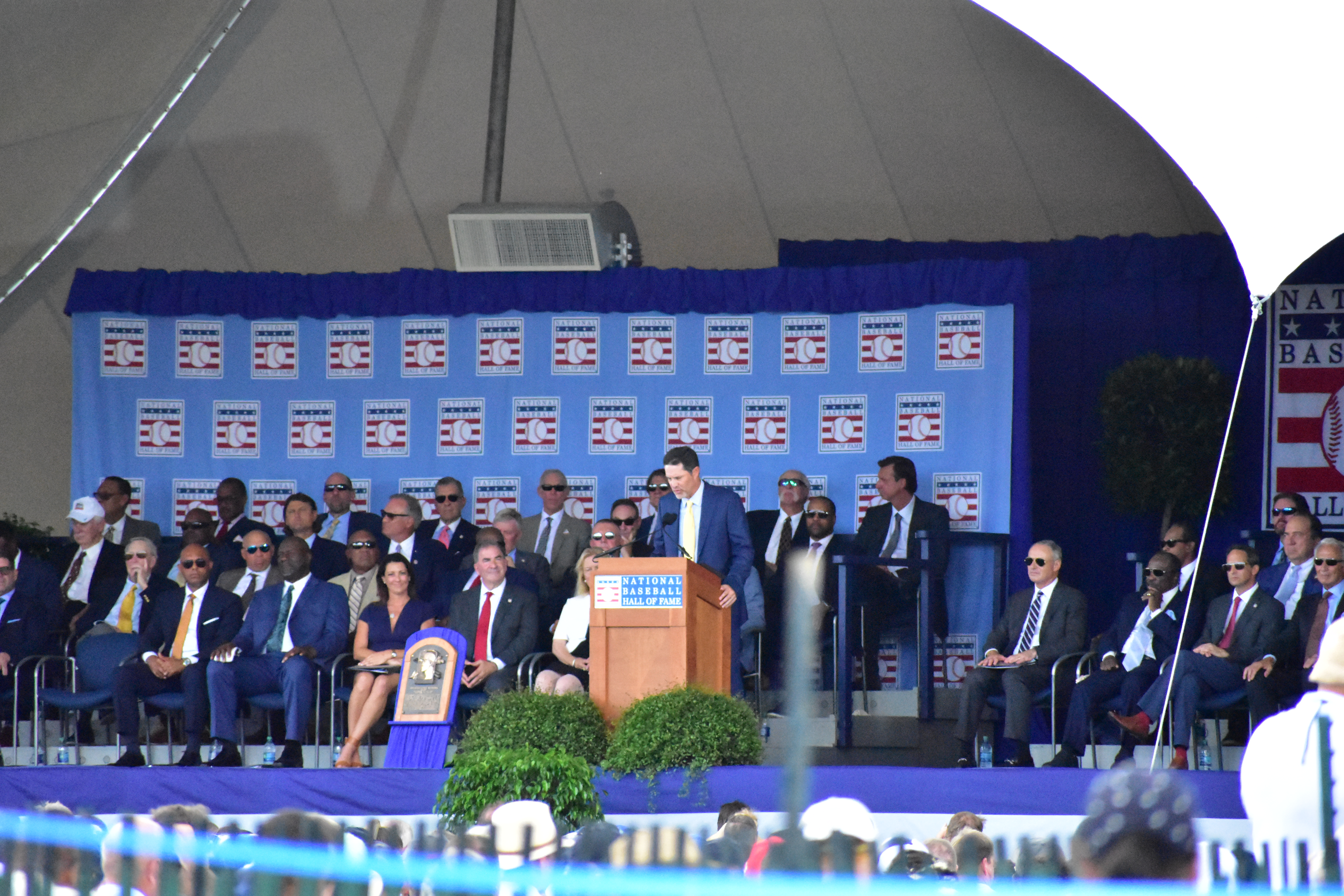
Mussina speaking at his induction into the Baseball Hall of Fame in July 2019

Mussina's candidacy for the Hall of Fame was the subject of debate, even during his career. "Do I compare to some guys who are in? I think I do", Mussina told USA Today in 2006. The only other pitchers to match Mussina's 17 seasons of 10 or more victories are Ted Lyons, Tom Glavine, Gaylord Perry, Phil Niekro, Walter Johnson, Greg Maddux, Warren Spahn, Cy Young, Don Sutton, Tom Seaver, Tommy John and Steve Carlton. All are Hall of Famers, except Tommy John. Of the 23 eligible pitchers who have at least 265 wins and an ERA of 3.69 or less, 20 are in the Hall of Fame, his ERA is the third highest ahead of Bobby Wallace, who was a full-time pitcher for just two seasons, and Red Ruffing. Mussina's consistency was often overshadowed by the dominant peaks of contemporaries like Pedro Martínez and Randy Johnson.

In 2014, Mussina received 20.3% of the vote on his first ballot (75% required for induction). In 2015, he received 24.6% on his second ballot. He rose to 43.0% in 2016 on his third ballot. In his fourth year of eligibility, support for his candidacy continued to steadily increase, as he received 51.8% of the vote. In 2018, he received 63.5% of the vote, inching closer to the 75% mark. Mussina was inducted into the Baltimore Orioles Hall of Fame on August 25, 2012.

On January 22, 2019, Mussina was elected to the National Baseball Hall of Fame and Museum, receiving 76.71% of the vote. He chose not to have a logo on his bust, saying, "I don't feel like I can pick one team over the other because they were both great to me. I did a lot in Baltimore and they gave me the chance and then in New York we went to the playoffs seven of eight years, and both teams were involved. To go in with no logo was the only decision I felt good about."

== Personal life ==
Mussina married Jana McKissick in 1997. The couple has two sons, Brycen and Peyton. He also adopted step-daughter Kyra, Jana's daughter from a previous marriage. He still resides in his hometown of Montoursville, where he is well known. He often helps out with the athletic programs at his high school and he operates a training camp for student athletes in the area. He serves on the Little League International Board of Directors, based in nearby South Williamsport, Pennsylvania.

Mussina is the head basketball coach for the boys' team at Montoursville Area High School. He first accepted the position in June 2013. When he received the phone call notifying him that he had been elected to the Hall of Fame, he had just completed a practice with his team. His brother Mark later became the basketball coach, but Mussina returned to the role in April 2025.

Mussina is of Slavic descent. Due to his last name, which was Americanized by his ancestors, he is often misidentified as an Italian American; before the 2006 World Baseball Classic, Gene Orza, the chief operating officer of the players union, even asked Mussina to play for Italy on that assumption.

In December 2014, Mussina was announced as one of the six recipients of the 2015 Silver Anniversary Awards, presented annually by the NCAA to outstanding former student-athletes on the 25th anniversary of the end of their college sports careers. The award is based on both athletic and professional success.

Mussina is also a crossword puzzle enthusiast and was featured in the 2006 documentary film Wordplay. He also collects tractors and vintage cars.

== See also ==
- List of Major League Baseball career wins leaders
- List of Major League Baseball career strikeout leaders
- List of Major League Baseball annual wins leaders
- List of Gold Glove Award winners at pitcher
