= Hughesville Junior Senior High School =

Hughesville Junior Senior School
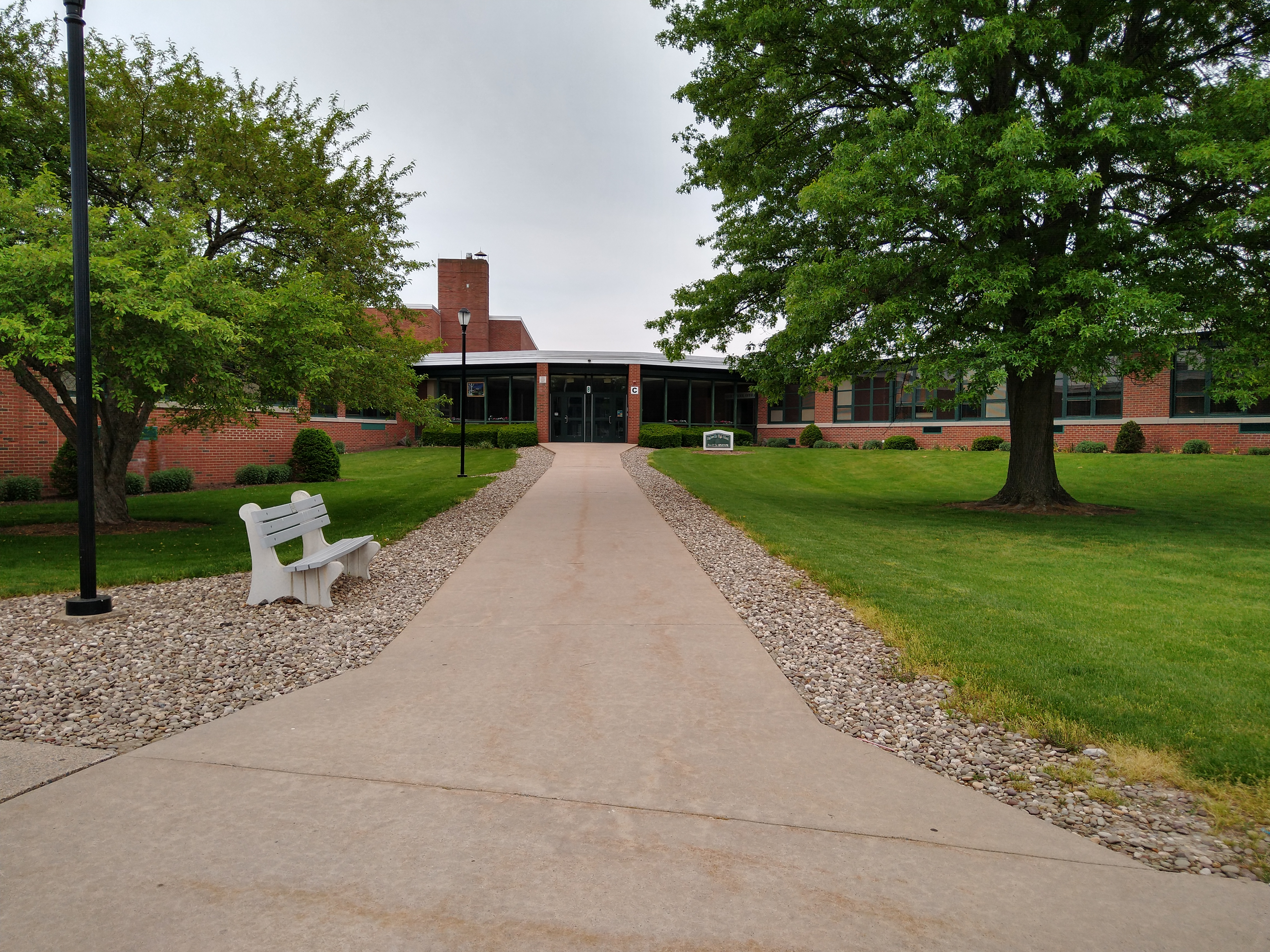
- Hughesville Junior Senior High School in May 2021

Location
- 349 Cemetery Street; Hughesville, Lycoming County, Pennsylvania 17737-1028; United States; 41.2400°N 76.7328°W

Information
- Type: Public
- School district: East Lycoming School District
- Principal: Richard Reichner, HS
- Principal: Tommy Coburn, JHS
- Staff: 88 staff members
- Faculty: 52 teachers in 2013, 64 teachers (2010)
- Grades: 7th - 12th
- Enrollment: 731 (2023-2024)
- Language: English
- Mascot: Spartans
- Website: http://www.elsd.org

Hughesville Junior Senior High School is located at 349 Cemetery Street, Hughesville, Lycoming County, Pennsylvania. It is the sole high school operated by East Lycoming School District. The school serves the Boroughs of Hughesville and Picture Rocks and Franklin Township, Jordan Township, Mill Creek Township, Moreland Township, Penn Township, Shrewsbury Township and Wolf Township in Lycoming County, Pennsylvania. The school is not a federally designated Title I school.

In 2015, there were 748 pupils in 7th through 12th grades. The school employed 50 teachers.

== Extracurriculars ==
East Lycoming School District offers a wide variety of clubs, activities and an extensive sports program.

=== Sports ===
The district funds:

Boys

- Baseball
- Basketball
- Cross country
- Football
- Golf
- Indoor track and field
- Soccer
- Tennis
- Track and field
- Wrestling

Girls

- Basketball
- Cheerleading
- Cross country
- Golf
- Indoor track and field
- Soccer
- Softball
- Tennis
- Track and field

Junior high school sports

Boys

- Basketball
- Football
- Soccer
- Wrestling

Girls

- Basketball
- Soccer
- Softball

According to PIAA directory July 2013
