= Montoursville Area School District =

School district in Pennsylvania

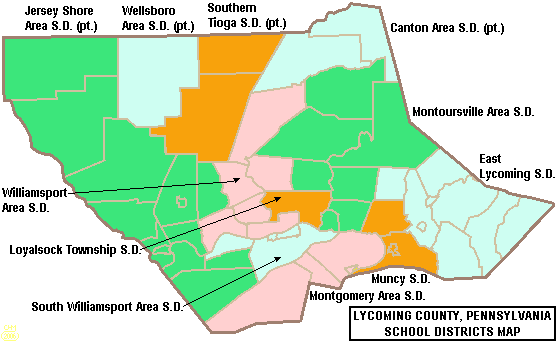

Address
- 50 North Arch Street Montoursville, Lycoming County, Pennsylvania, 17754; United States

District information
- Type: Public
- Grades: K–12

Other information
- Website: www.montoursville.k12.pa.us

The Montoursville Area School District (MASD) is a small, rural public school district in Lycoming County. The district serves the borough of Montoursville, plus the townships of Fairfield, Upper Fairfield, Eldred, Gamble, Cascade, and Plunketts Creek. The district encompasses approximately 189.8 square miles (492 km^{2}). According to 2000 federal census data, it serves a resident population of 13,512. By 2010, the US Census Bureau reported the district's population declined to 13,209 people. The educational attainment levels for the Montoursville Area School District population (25 years old and over) were 92% high school graduates and 22.8% college graduates.

Montoursville Area School District operates four schools: Loyalsock Valley Elementary School, Lyter Elementary School, C.E. McCall Middle School, and Montoursville Area High School. High school students may choose to attend Lycoming Career and Technology Center for training in the construction and mechanical trades. The BLaST Intermediate Unit IU 17 provides the district with a wide variety of services like specialized education for disabled students and hearing, speech and visual disability services and professional development for staff and faculty.

== Extracurriculars ==
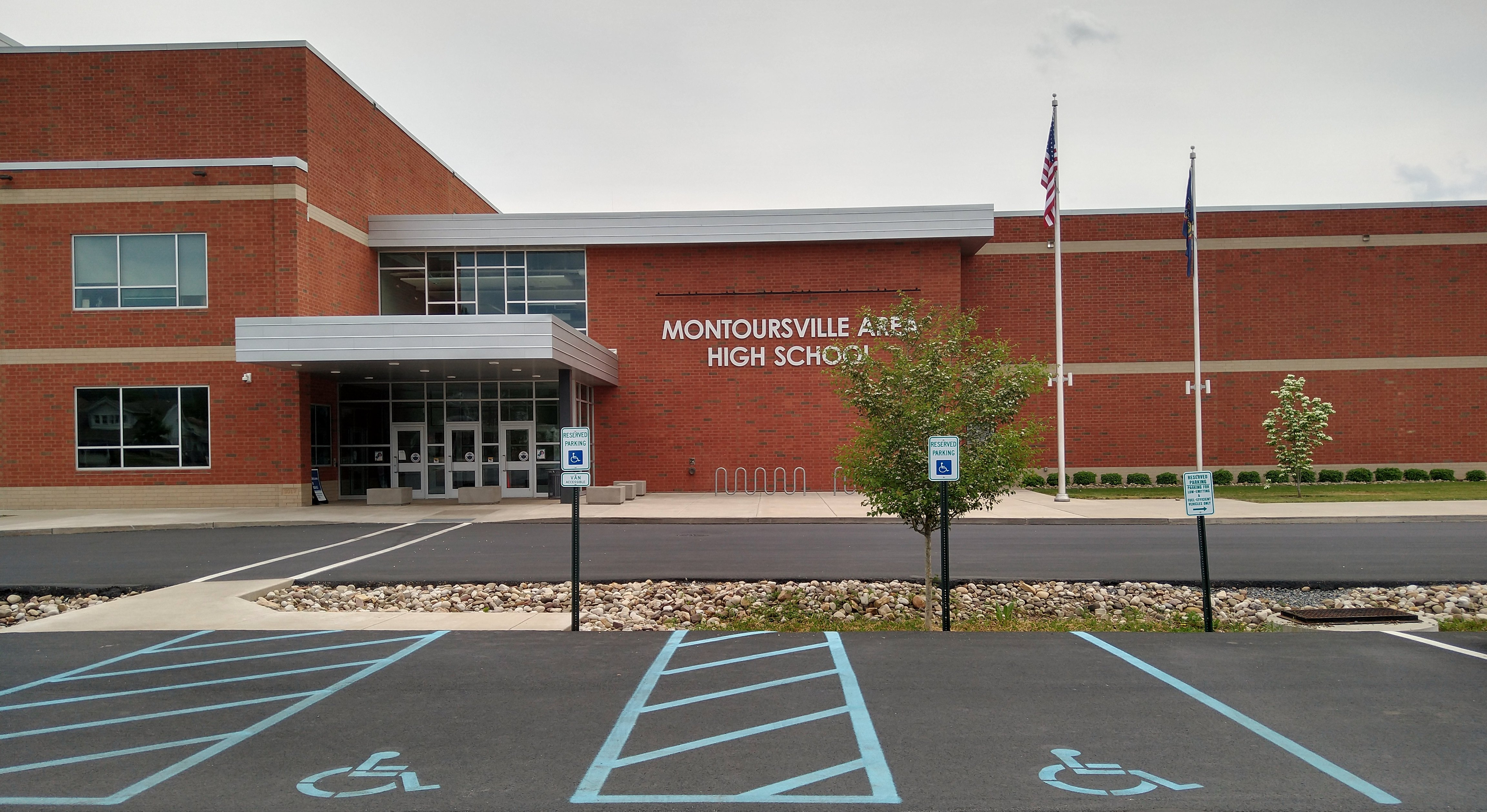
Montoursville Area High School in May 2021

The Montoursville Area School District offers a wide variety of clubs, activities and an extensive, publicly funded sports program.

The sports programs are associated with the Pennsylvania Heartland Athletic Conference and the Pennsylvania Interscholastic Athletic Association (PIAA). The Pennsylvania Heartland Athletic Conference is a voluntary association of 25 PIAA High Schools within the central Pennsylvania region.

=== Sports ===
The district funds:

Varsity

Boys

- Baseball - AAA
- Basketball- AAA
- Cross country - AA
- Football - AAA
- Golf - AA
- Soccer - AA
- Swimming and diving - AA
- Tennis - AA
- Track and field - AA
- Wrestling - AA

Girls

- Basketball - AA
- Cross country - AA
- Golf - AA
- Soccer - AA
- Softball - AA
- Swimming and diving - AAA
- Tennis - AA
- Track and field - AA

Middle school sports

Boys

- Basketball
- Cross country
- Football
- Soccer
- Wrestling

Girls

- Basketball
- Cross country
- Softball

According to PIAA directory July 2013
