= Lycoming County Fair =

Annual event in Hughesville, Pennsylvania, United States

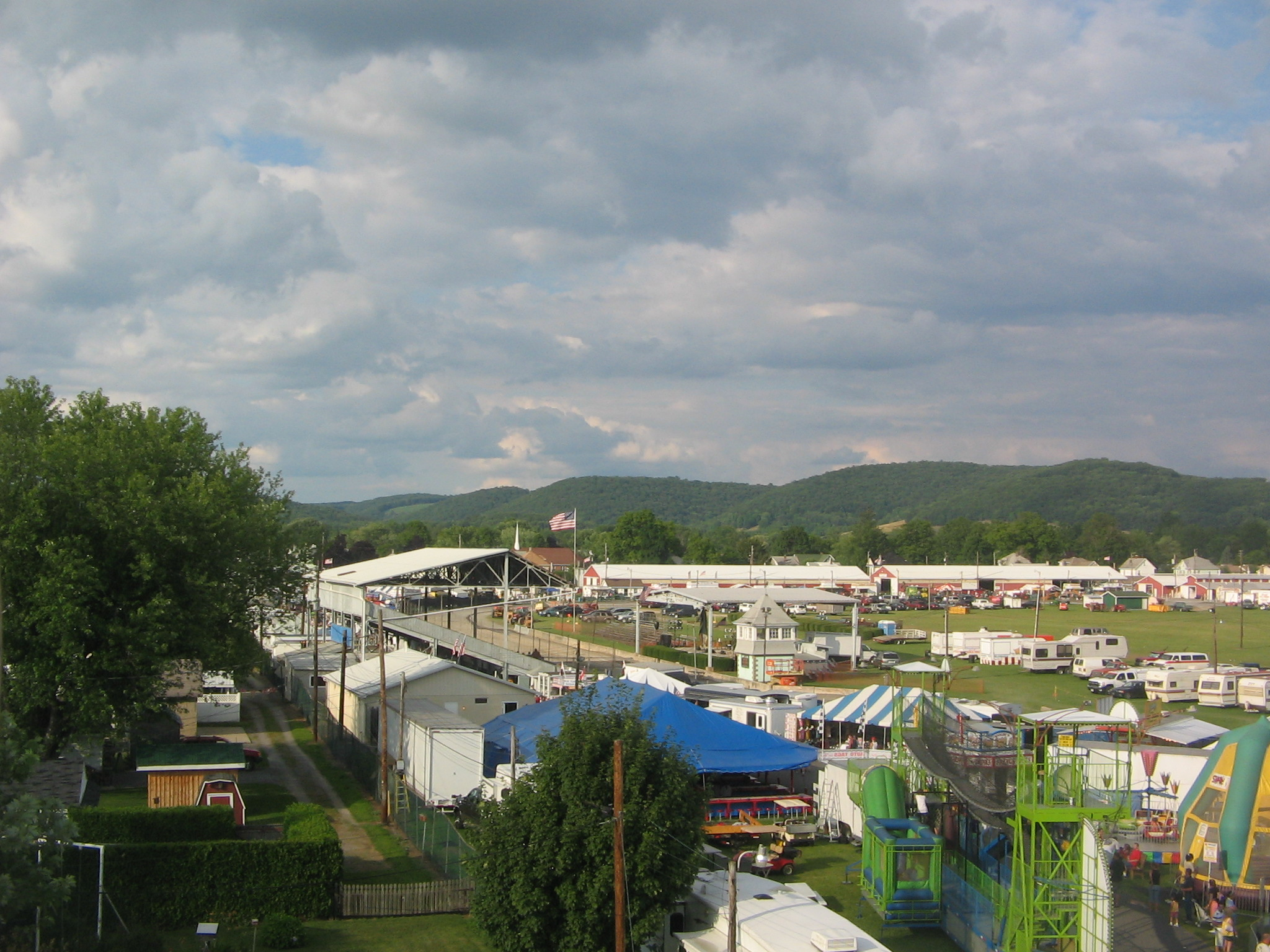
- Genre: Summer Fair
- Dates: 08-18 July 2026
- Location(s): Hughesville, PA
- Years active: 155
- Founded: 1870
- Attendance: 2007 - 124,425
- Website: Lycoming County Fair

The Lycoming County Fair is an annual event held in Hughesville, Pennsylvania. This year will mark 155 years the fair has been in operation. Attendance during the 2007 Lycoming County Fair totaled 124,425

== Entertainment ==
The Lycoming County Fair offers live entertainment including:

- Musical Bands
- Tractor pulls
- Horse Racing
- Horse shows
- Demolition Derby
- Figure 8 racing
- Comedy Shows
- Fireworks

The fair also offers daily programs that display exhibits featuring cows, horses, sheep and goats.

== Fair Schedule ==
The next Lycoming County Fair will be held 08–18 July 2026.

== Board of directors ==
The Lycoming County Fair Association board of directors include:

- Dale Levan: Vice President
- James Springman: President
- Clifford Yaw: Treasurer
- Karen Yaw: Secretary
- Dennis Simons: Concessions Manager
- Richard Gardner
- Robert Heydenreich
- Dean Kepner
- Shawn McCoy

== Other activities ==
Throughout the year the fairgrounds are used to host many other events besides the fair. Some of those events include:

- Farm and heritage antique machinery shows
- Automobile shows
- Rodeos
- Circus
- Horse shows
- Music festivals
- Tractor pulls
- Motorcycle races
- Billtown Blues Festival

== History ==
=== 1800s ===
The fair traces its history from 1870 and in 2009 celebrated its 139th anniversary.

The organization actually had its origin in 1868, three years after the end of the American Civil War. Ten local persons met and organized the Muncy Valley Farmer's Club for the purpose of discussing agricultural topics. Dr. George Hill was chosen to be president. Two years later in 1870, the club decided to hold its first exhibition in which area people could exhibit their livestock, grains, fruits, vegetables, canned goods and handicrafts. Early maps indicate the first exhibition was held on grounds of the Hughesville Trotting Park located at the southern end of the borough.

The Muncy Valley Farmers' Club continued to grow in its membership and its annual exhibition continued to grow and be successful. With a membership of nearly 200 by 1875, a charter of incorporation was drawn up. Dues were set at $.50 per year. Despite the continued growth and success of the agricultural exhibition in Hughesville, stiff competition for hosting a county fair was developing in Williamsport.

By the late 19th century fairs had been held in two locations in Williamsport, PA; one in the Vallamont section and the other in Memorial Park near the site of Bowman Field Stadium. Both fairs enjoyed success for a few years. Interest and support for the fair in Hughesville prevailed and eventually Hughesville was chosen to be the permanent site for the Lycoming County Fair, sometime in the early 20th century.

=== 1900s ===
The first indication of the actual purchase of land, the result of extensive research by a local lawyer, was in 1915. Court records show that by 1930, some 50 acres (200,000 m^{2}) of land had been deeded to the Lycoming County Fair Association.

World War I saw the fair's first cancellations.

The 1920s brought continued growth for the fair with dramatic increases in attendance. This was due in part to the economic "good times" of the "roaring twenties." Another factor that promoted attendance was the Williamsport and North Branch Railroad. Headquartered in Hughesville, the railroad ran special "fair excursions" for the benefit of fairgoers.

The 1920s saw the beginning of a special feature that was to be a regular part of the fair through the 20s, 30s and 40s. Following World War II, automobile racing on the 0.5 mi (804.7 m) dirt track drew large crowds. At that time, the races were sanctioned by the AAA. During these years many of the biggest names in American Auto Racing appeared at Hughesville. The field often included Indianapolis 500 veterans. Among the biggest were Ted Horn, Tommy Hinnershitz, Jimmy Bryan, Johnny Parsons, Le Wallard, and Joie Chitwood.

Another special edition to the fairgrounds during this time period was an airplane landing field. Construction of hangars and a 1,700 ft (520 m). runway was completed. The official opening and dedication took place on September 3–5, 1930. The Hughesville Airport was considered an important refueling stop on a direct route between New York City and Cleveland, Ohio. In 1934, state and federal monies made improvements to the facility. The US Postal Service declared a special "air mail day" on May 19, 1938 to honor the Hughesville Fairgrounds Airport. On May 14, 1929, Amelia Earhart of Trans Atlantic flight fame, made an emergency landing in her plane at the landing field on the Hughesville Fairgrounds. Earhart had intentions of landing at Bellefonte for refueling but lost her way. She noticed then landing field in the middle of the fairgrounds and took advantage of it.

The Lycoming County Fair was curtailed starting in 1942 due to restrictions and demands of World War II. Tragedy struck the fairgrounds during the early morning hours of September 4, 1944. During a severe thunderstorm a large exhibition building was hit by lightning. Within minutes the wooden structure was destroyed.

The years following World War II brought several changes in operation and the airport was soon abandoned. Very little use of the airport was made after the war. Soon the hangars were removed and the area was used for a variety of purposes, including a parking area for fair patrons. A decision was made to end automobile racing during the 1950s. Factors included safety concerns, noise and dust issues affecting nearby homes. The date for the fair was changed during the 1950s from its beginning (usually in September or October) to mid-July. It was also extended to a ten-day fair.

=== The new millennium ===
On what would've been the sesquicentennial anniversary in 2020, the COVID-19 pandemic caused the fair's first cancellation in 75 years. The next year saw its resumption.
