= Muncy School District =

School district in Pennsylvania

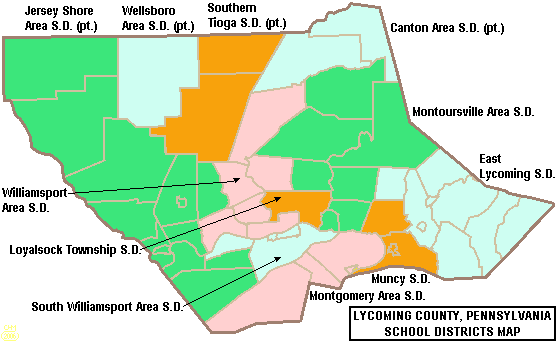

Address
- 206 Sherman Street Muncy, Lycoming County, Pennsylvania, 17756-1346; United States

Other information
- Website: www.muncysd.org

The Muncy School District is small, rural, public school district located in southern Lycoming County. The school serves the borough of Muncy, plus the affiliated townships of Muncy Township and Muncy Creek Township. The mascot of the school is the Indian, or Native American. Muncy School District encompasses approximately 36 square miles (93 km^{2}). According to 2000 federal census data, it served a resident population of 7,209. By 2010, the district's population declined to 7,042 people. But according to the 2020 federal census data, the districts population increased to 7,370 The educational attainment levels for the population 25 and over were 94.4% high school graduates and 19.8% college graduates. The school colors are White and Navy Blue In the year 2019, construction went underway for a new addition to the high school. They added many amenities such as a new library, weight room, a room downstairs for wrestling practice, and many more. The total cost of all of this cost around $15,000,000. This took almost 2 years to finish, starting in April 2019 and being finished in December of 2020. The school has a student body population of more than 1000 students through grades K-12. the student teacher ratio is 14:1

According to the Pennsylvania Budget and Policy Center, 32.8% of the district's pupils lived at 185% or below the Federal Poverty Level as shown by their eligibility for the federal free or reduced price school meal programs in 2012. The district residents' per capita income was $17,107, while the median family income was just $39,678. In Lycoming County, the median household income was $45,430. In the Commonwealth, the median family income was $49,501 and the United States median family income was $49,445, in 2010. By 2013, the median household income in the United States rose to $52,100.

The Muncy School District operates 2 schools: Ward L. Myers Elementary School (grades K–6) and Muncy Junior-Senior High School (grades 7–12). Both schools have been accredited by the Middle States Association of Colleges and Schools. High school students can attend the Lycoming Career and Technology Center for training in the building trades, drafting & design careers, criminal justice careers, allied health careers, culinary arts and other careers. The Muncy School District contracts with the BLaST Intermediate Unit No. 17 for services such as psychological testing, preemployment criminal background screening, occupational and physical therapy services.

== Extracurriculars ==
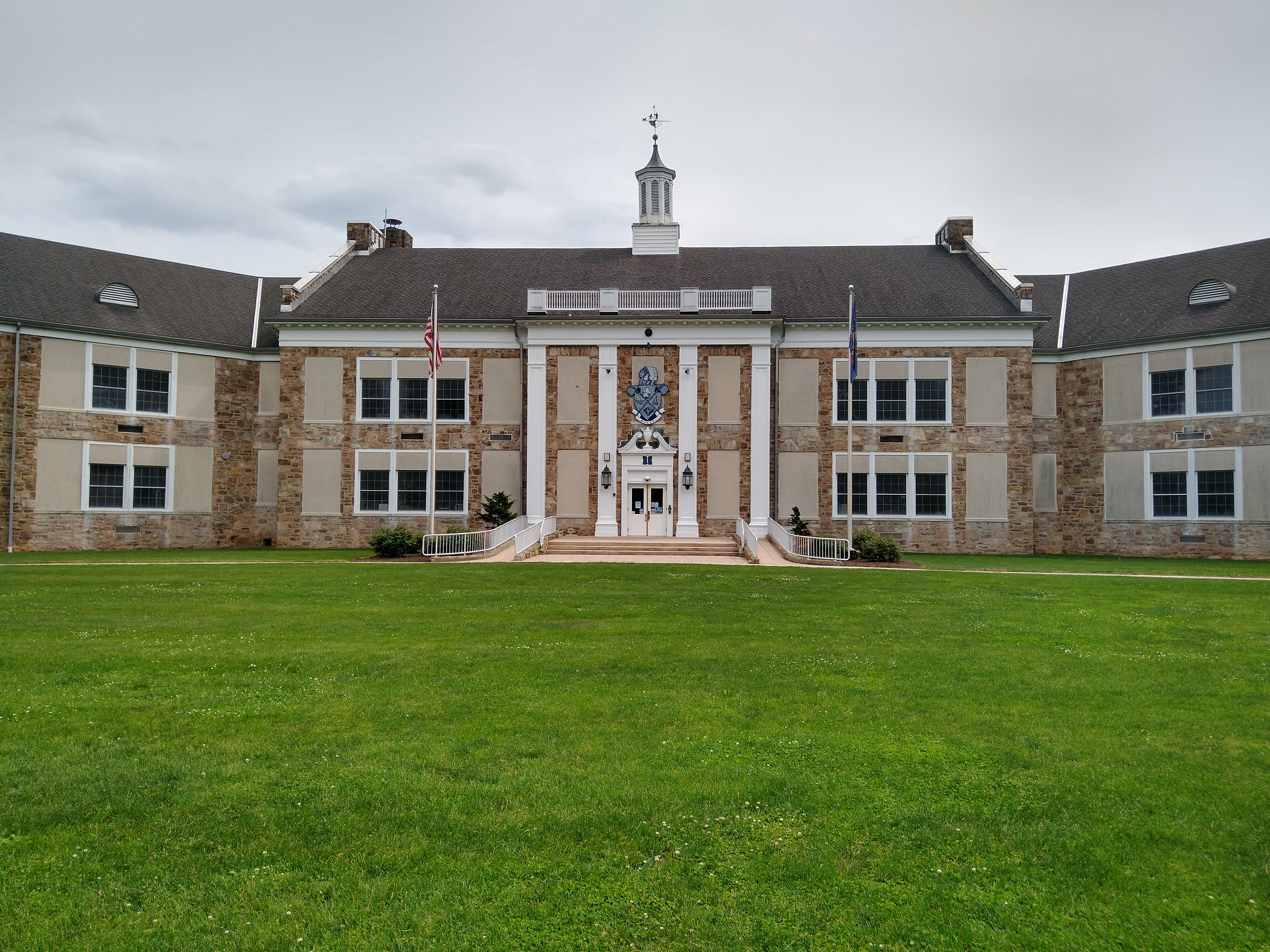
Muncy High School in May 2021

The Muncy School District offers a wide variety of clubs, activities and 20 sports. Muncy School District is affiliated with Heartland Conference and the Northern Tier League in Football. Several sports are offered in cooperation with Montgomery Area School District.

=== Sports ===
The district funds:

Boys

- Baseball - AA
- Basketball - AA
- Bocce Ball - A
- Football - A
- Soccer - A
- Tennis - AA
- Wrestling - AA
- Track And Field, in association with Montgomery Area School District- A
- Cross Country - A
- Golf- AA
- Swimming And Diving - A

Bocce Ball - AA

Girls

- Basketball - AA
- Field hockey - A
- Bocce Ball
- Soccer - A
- Softball - AA
- Tennis - AA
- Wrestling - AAAA
- Track And Field - AA
- Swimming And Diving - A
- Cheerleading - A

Junior high school sports

Boys

- Basketball
- Baseball
- Football
- Soccer
- Wrestling
- Swimming And Diving
- Cross Country

Girls

- Basketball
- Field hockey
- Softball
- Swimming And Diving
- Cross Country

- According to PIAA directory July 2016
