= East Lycoming School District =

School district in Pennsylvania

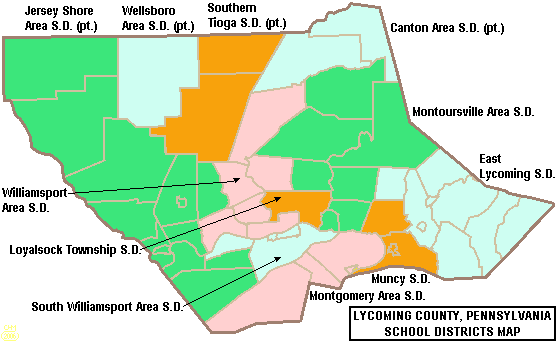

Address
- 349 Cemetery Street Hughesville, Lycoming County, Pennsylvania, 17737-1028; United States

Students and staff
- District mascot: Spartans

Other information
- Website: https://www.elsd.org/

The East Lycoming School District is a small, rural, public school district located in Lycoming County, Pennsylvania. It serves the Boroughs of Hughesville and Picture Rocks and Franklin Township, Jordan Township, Mill Creek Township, Moreland Township, Penn Township, Shrewsbury Township and Wolf Township in Lycoming County, Pennsylvania. East Lycoming School District encompasses approximately 148 square miles (380 km^{2}). According to 2000 federal census data, East Lycoming School District served a resident population of 10,368 people. By 2010, the District's population was 10,428 people. The educational attainment levels for the East Lycoming School District population (25 years old and over) were 89% high school graduates and 18.7% college graduates. The district is one of the 500 public school districts of Pennsylvania.

According to the Pennsylvania Budget and Policy Center, 30.4% of the East Lycoming School District's pupils lived at 89.4% or below the Federal Poverty Level as shown by their eligibility for the federal free or reduced price school meal programs in 2012. In 2009, the District residents’ per capita income was $17,385, while the median family income was $43,314. In the Commonwealth, the median family income was $49,501 and the United States median family income was $49,445, in 2010. By 2013, the median household income in the United States rose to $52,100.

According to District officials, in school year 2009-10, the East Lycoming School District provided basic educational services to 1,676 pupils. It employed: 123 teachers, 68 full-time and part-time support personnel, and 11 administrators. East Lycoming School District received more than $11.4 million in state funding in school year 2009-10. Per East Lycoming School District officials, in school year 2007–08, the East Lycoming School District provided basic educational services to 1,674 pupils. It employed: 126 teachers, 65 full-time and part-time support personnel, and 11 administrators.

East Lycoming School District operates four public schools: Hughesville Junior Senior High School, Ashkar Elementary School, Ferrell Elementary School and Renn Elementary School. High school students may choose to attend Lycoming Career and Technology Center for training in the construction and mechanical trades, child are, culinary art, criminal justice and other careers. The BLaST Intermediate Unit IU17 provides the District with a wide variety of services like specialized education for disabled students and hearing, speech and visual disability services and professional development for staff and faculty.

== Extracurriculars ==
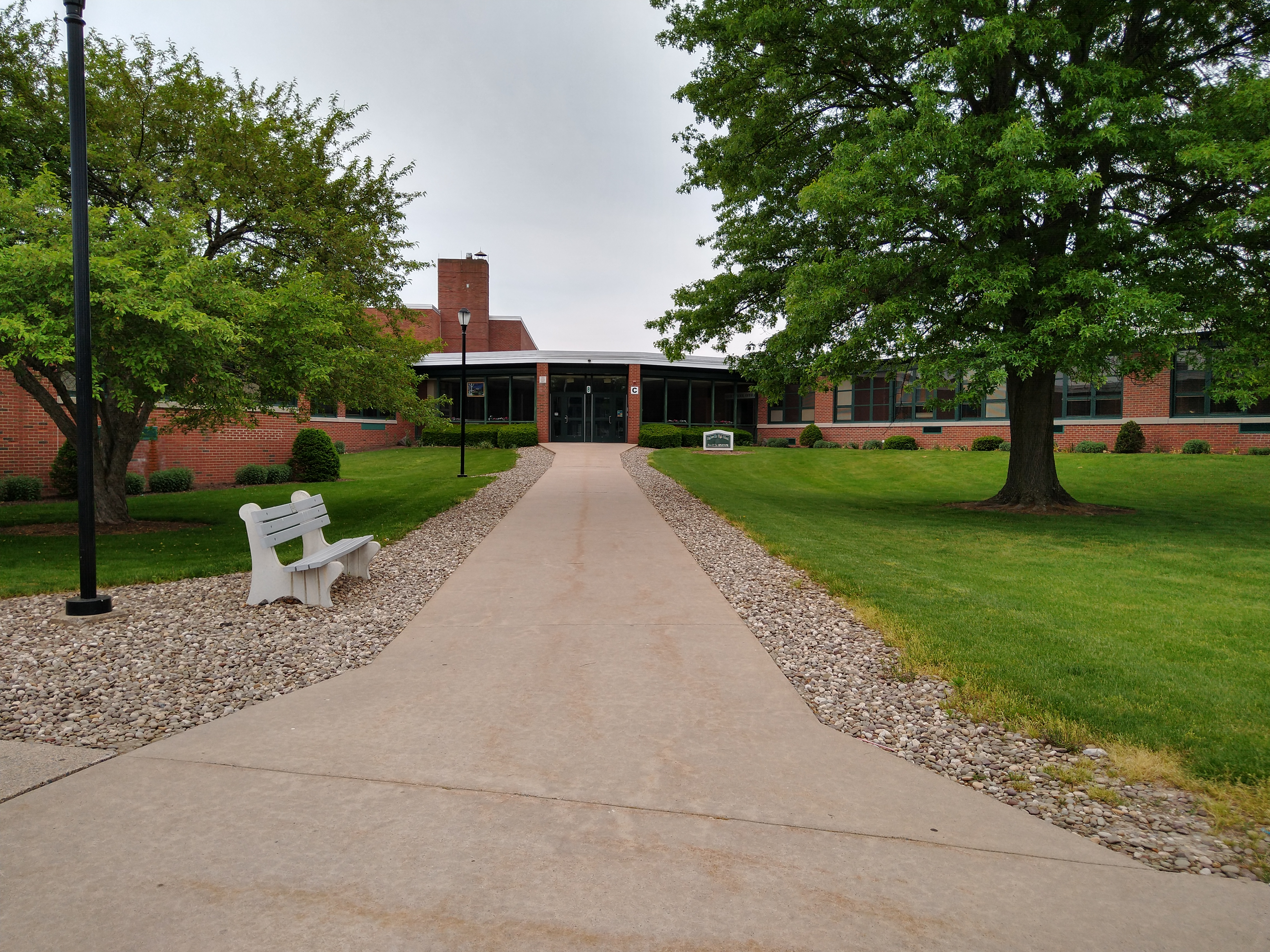
Hughesville Junior Senior High School photographed in 2021

East Lycoming School District offers a variety of clubs, activities and an extensive sports program. East Lycoming School District participates in the Pennsylvania Heartland Athletic Conference and the Pennsylvania Interscholastic Athletic Association. The Pennsylvania Heartland Athletic Conference is a voluntary association of 25 PIAA High Schools within the central Pennsylvania region.

=== Sports ===
The District funds:

Boys

- Baseball
- Basketball
- Cross Country
- Football
- Golf
- Indoor Track and Field
- Soccer
- Swimming and Diving (added 2015)
- Tennis
- Track and field
- Wrestling

Girls

- Basketball
- Cheer
- Cross Country
- Golf
- Indoor Track and Field
- Soccer (Fall)
- Softball
- Swimming and Diving (added 2015)
- Tennis
- Track and field
- Volleyball

Junior high school sports

Boys

- Basketball
- Football
- Soccer
- Wrestling

Girls

- Basketball
- Soccer (Fall)
- Softball
- Volleyball

According to PIAA directory July 2015
