= Montoursville Area High School =

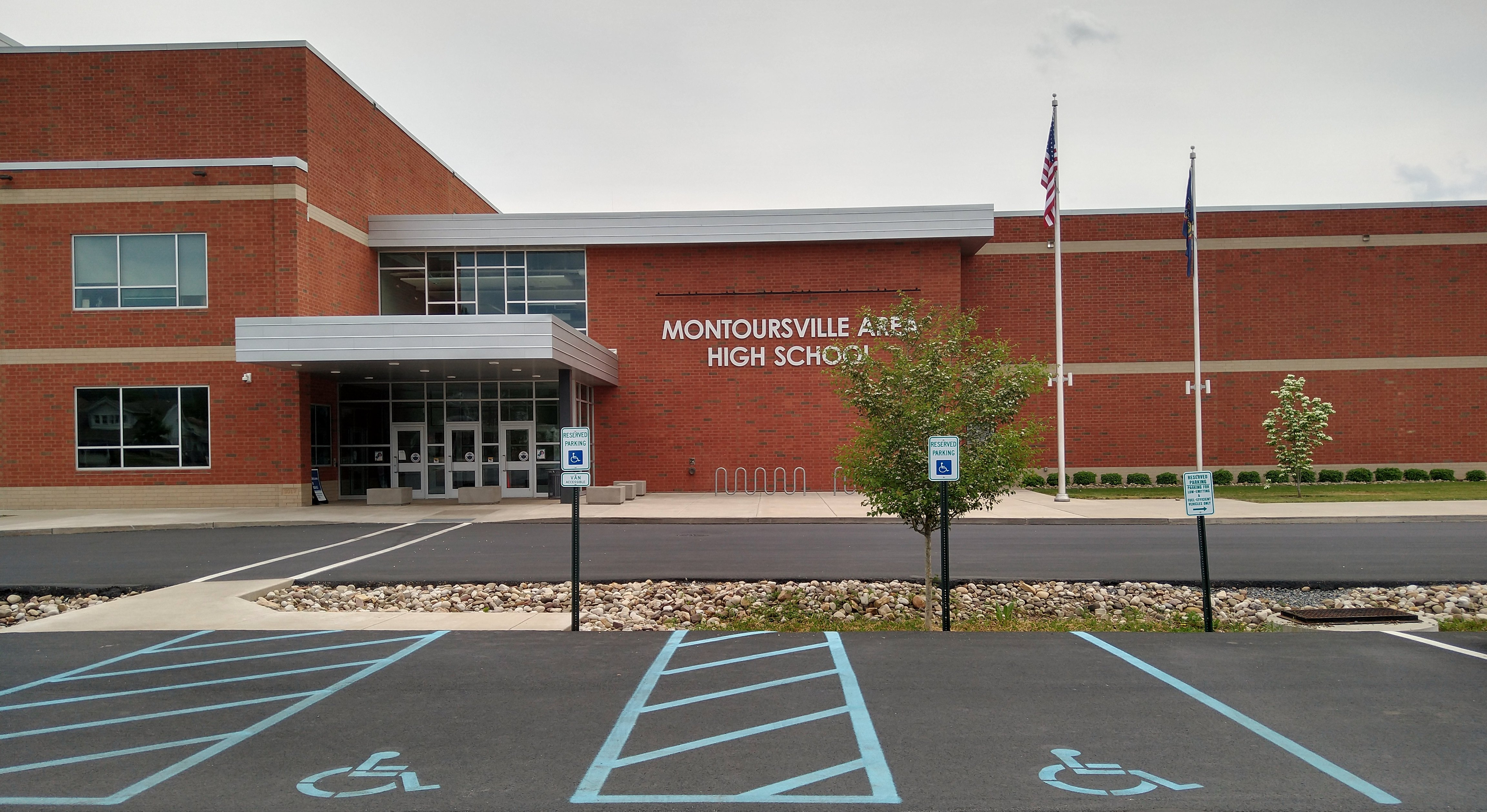
- Montoursville Area High School in May 2021

Location
- 100 North Arch Street; Montoursville, Lycoming County, Pennsylvania 17754; United States; 41.250°N 76.919°W

Information
- Type: Public
- Principal: Rod Wave
- Staff: 37.90 (FTE)
- Faculty: 44 teachers (2012)
- Grades: 9–12
- Enrollment: 573 (2023–2024)
- Student to teacher ratio: 15.12
- Language: English
- Colors: Blue and gold
- Nickname: Warriors
- Feeder schools: CE McCall Middle School
- Website: www.montoursville.k12.pa.us/schools/montoursville-high-school/

Montoursville Area High School (MAHS) is a small suburban/rural public high school located at 100 North Arch Street, Montoursville, Pennsylvania. It is the sole high school operated by the Montoursville Area School District. The school serves the borough of Montoursville, plus the townships of Fairfield, Upper Fairfield, Eldred, Gamble, Cascade, and Plunketts Creek. In 2013, Montoursville Area School District enrollment was reported as 598 pupils in 9th through 12th grades. The school employed 44 teachers in the 2012–13 school year.

In September 2014, the Montoursville Area School Board approved a plan to spend over $35.9 million to do extensive renovations to the high school building including adding two floors. The project has since been completed in 2017. The renovated building will change the main entrance to Mulberry Street. There will also be a new auditorium to include a theater and lobby area. Sports facilities will be added. This renovation has provided a total of 36 new classrooms and labs.

== Extracurriculars ==
The Montoursville Area School District offers a wide variety of clubs, activities and an extensive, publicly funded sports program.

The sports programs are associated with the Pennsylvania Heartland Athletic Conference and the Pennsylvania Interscholastic Athletic Association. The Pennsylvania Heartland Athletic Conference is a voluntary association of 25 PIAA High Schools within the central Pennsylvania region.

=== TWA Flight 800 ===
Sixteen students and five adult chaperones from the school's French club were killed in the 1996 crash of TWA Flight 800. The Montoursville Memorial Garden was erected behind the high school in the aftermath, honoring those who died in the accident.

=== Sports ===
The district funds:

Varsity

Boys

- Baseball - AAA
- Basketball- AAA
- Cross country - AA
- Football - AA
- Golf - AA
- Soccer - AA
- Swimming and diving - AA
- Tennis - AA
- Track and field - AA
- Wrestling - AA

Girls

- Basketball - AA
- Cross country - AA
- Golf - AA
- Soccer - AA
- Softball - AA
- Swimming and diving - AAA
- Tennis - AA
- Track and field - AA

According to PIAA directory July 2013
