= Hughesville, Pennsylvania =

Borough in Pennsylvania, US

- Borough
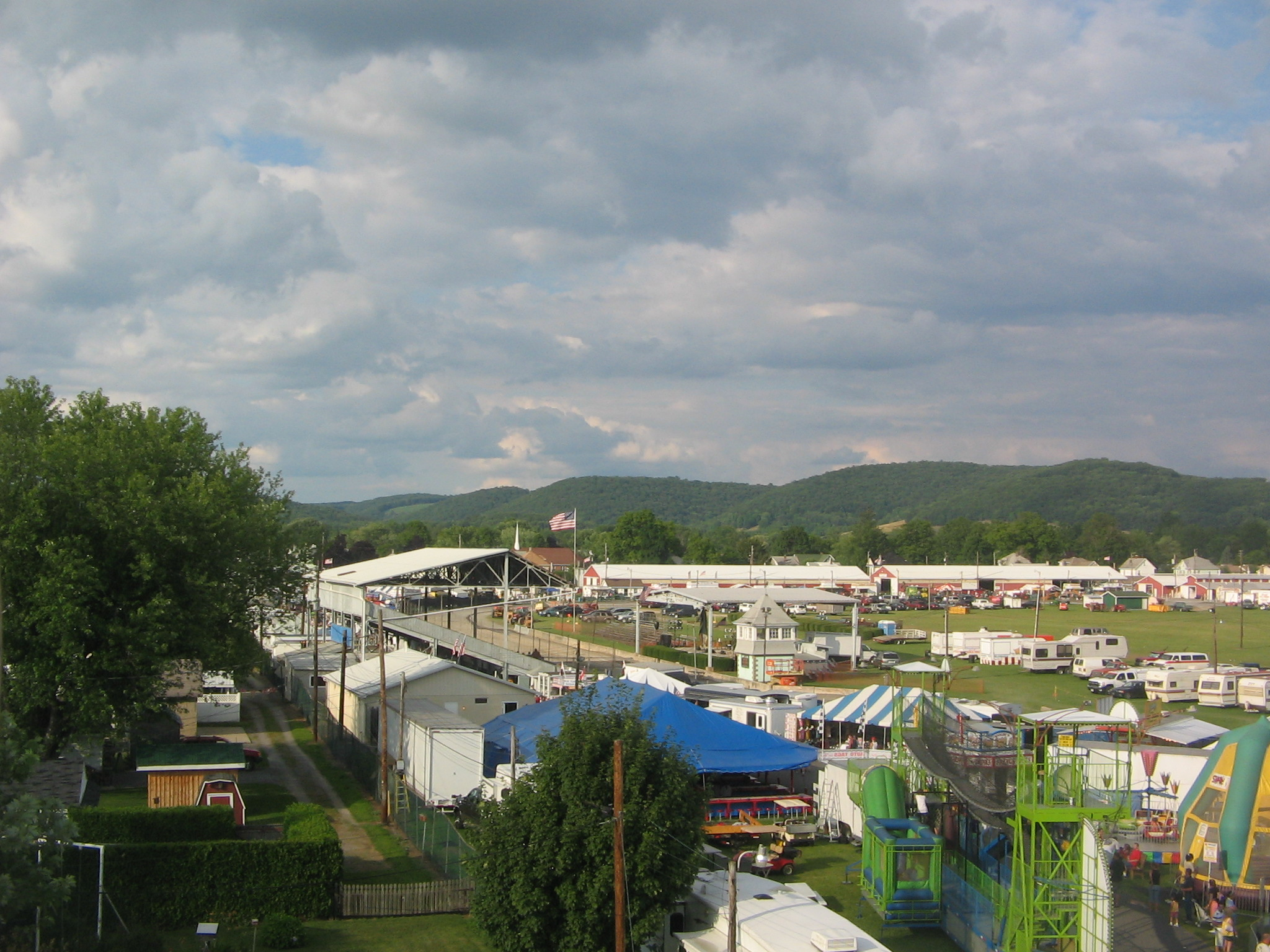
- The Lycoming County Fair in Hughesville

- Location of Hughesville in Lycoming County, Pennsylvania

- Map of Pennsylvania highlighting Lycoming County
- Coordinates: 41°14′25″N 76°43′29″W
- Country: United States
- State: Pennsylvania
- County: Lycoming
- Settled: 1816
- Incorporated: April 23, 1852

Government
  - Mayor: Shawn Combs (F)

Area
  - Total: 0.64 sq mi (1.67 km^{2})
  - Land: 0.64 sq mi (1.67 km^{2})
  - Water: 0 sq mi (0.00 km^{2})
- Elevation (borough benchmark): 580 ft (180 m)
- Highest elevation (northwest borough boundary): 582 ft (177 m)
- Lowest elevation (Muncy Creek): 562 ft (171 m)

Population (2020)
  - Total: 2,154
  - Density: 3,340.1/sq mi (1,289.62/km^{2})
- Time zone: UTC-5 (Eastern (EST))
  - Summer (DST): UTC-4 (EDT)
- ZIP code: 17737
- Area code: 570
- FIPS code: 42-36160
- GNIS feature ID: 1213971
- Website: www.hughesvillepa.org

Hughesville is a borough in Lycoming County, Pennsylvania, United States. The population was 2,155 at the 2020 census. It is part of the Williamsport, Pennsylvania Metropolitan Statistical Area.

== History ==
Hughesville is named for Jeptha Hughes, who purchased land from John Heap in 1816 and laid out the town of "Hughesburg" before selling the entire plot to Daniel Harrold in 1820. The town grew slowly around a gristmill that was constructed by Jacob Clayton. A tavern was built in 1820, and a general store followed ten years later. The first doctor in Hughesville, John W. Peale, arrived in 1828. Hughesville was incorporated as a borough on April 23, 1852. The first dentist opened an office in 1853 and the first lawyer settled in Hughesville in 1875.

Early industries in Hughesville were built to serve the farmers and citizens of eastern Lycoming County. They included a chair factory opened in 1829, a wagon shop in 1830, several distilleries, a sawmill and planing mill, and a furniture factory. Electricity was introduced to Hughesville in 1891 along with running water.

== Geography ==
Hughesville is located at 41°14′25″N 76°43′29″W (41.240402, -76.724852). It is completely surrounded by Wolf Township. As the crow flies, Lycoming County is approximately 130 miles (209 km) northwest of Philadelphia and 165 miles (266 km) east-northeast of Pittsburgh.

According to the United States Census Bureau, the borough has a total area of 0.6 square miles (1.6 km^{2}), all land.

Hughesville hosts the Lycoming County Fair and is home to the East Lycoming School District.

== Demographics ==
Historical population
Census	Pop.	Note	%±
1860	363		—
1870	456		25.6%
1880	899		97.1%
1890	1,358		51.1%
1900	1,528		12.5%
1910	1,650		8.0%
1920	1,577		−4.4%
1930	1,868		18.5%
1940	1,947		4.2%
1950	2,095		7.6%
1960	2,218		5.9%
1970	2,249		1.4%
1980	2,174		−3.3%
1990	2,049		−5.7%
2000	2,220		8.3%
2010	2,128		−4.1%
2020	2,154		1.2%
2021 (est.)	2,140	▼	−0.6%

As of the census of 2000, there were 2,220 people, 967 households, and 608 families residing in the borough. The population density was 3,420.6 inhabitants per square mile (1,320.7/km^{2}). There were 1,029 housing units at an average density of 1,585.5 per square mile (612.2/km^{2}). The racial makeup of the borough was 98.60% White, 0.18% African American, 0.36% Native American, 0.05% Asian, 0.18% from other races, and 0.63% from two or more races. Hispanic or Latino of any race were 0.81% of the population.

There were 967 households, out of which 29.0% had children under the age of 18 living with them, 48.9% were married couples living together, 10.5% had a female householder with no husband present, and 37.1% were non-families. 32.4% of all households were made up of individuals, and 15.5% had someone living alone who was 65 years of age or older. The average household size was 2.30 and the average family size was 2.90.

In the borough the population was spread out, with 24.9% under the age of 18, 7.0% from 18 to 24, 28.8% from 25 to 44, 21.3% from 45 to 64, and 18.1% who were 65 years of age or older. The median age was 38 years. For every 100 females there were 92.7 males. For every 100 females age 18 and over, there were 83.9 males.

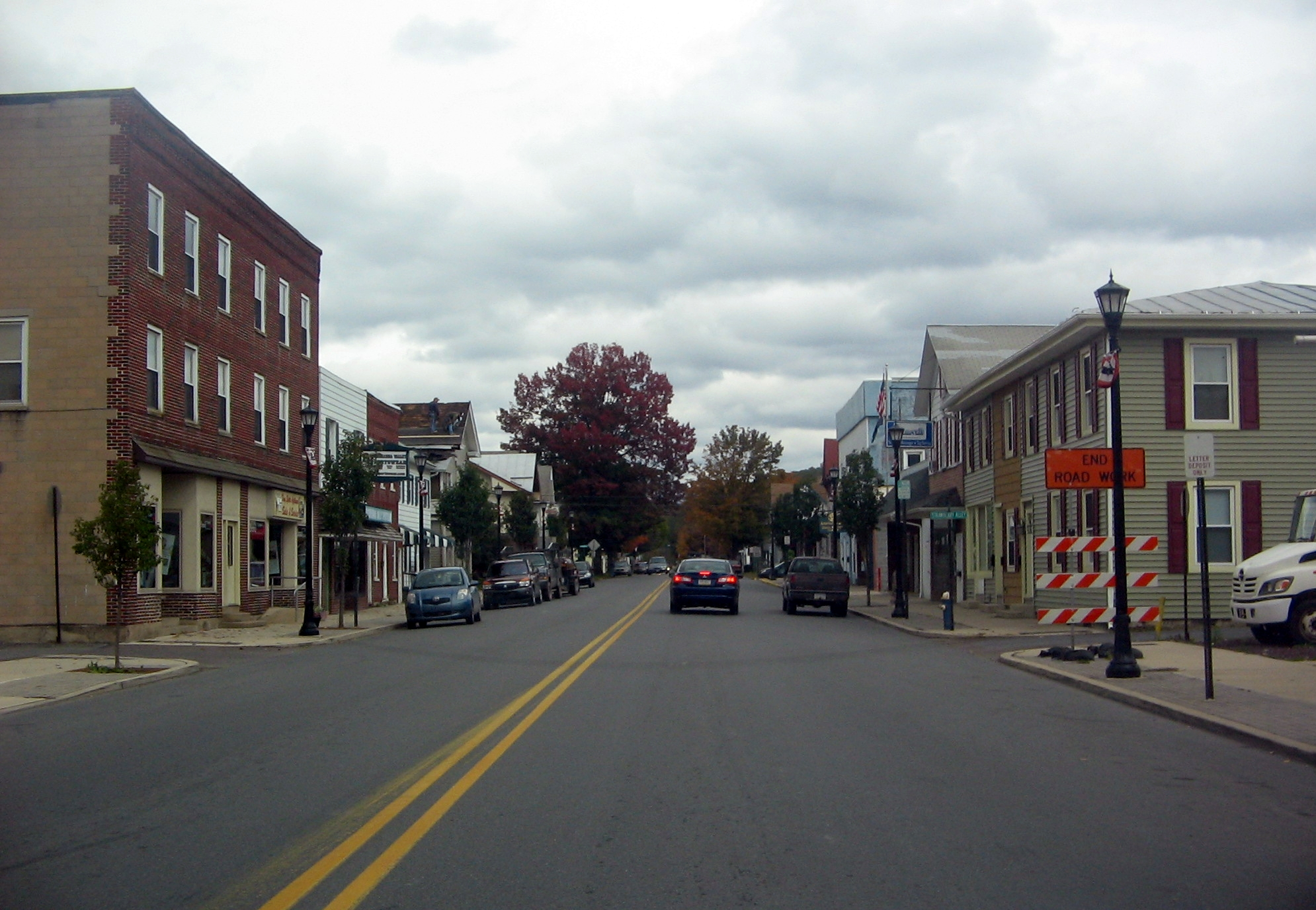
A view down Main Street in Hughesville

The median income for a household in the borough was $29,361, and the median income for a family was $37,905. Males had a median income of $29,750 versus $20,794 for females. The per capita income for the borough was $16,271. About 4.0% of families and 6.9% of the population were below the poverty line, including 4.5% of those under age 18 and 11.7% of those age 65 or over.

== See also ==
History of Lycoming County, Pennsylvania
