= Josephine Furnace =

Historic blast furnace in Pennsylvania, United States

Coordinates: 40.4754°N 79.1839°W

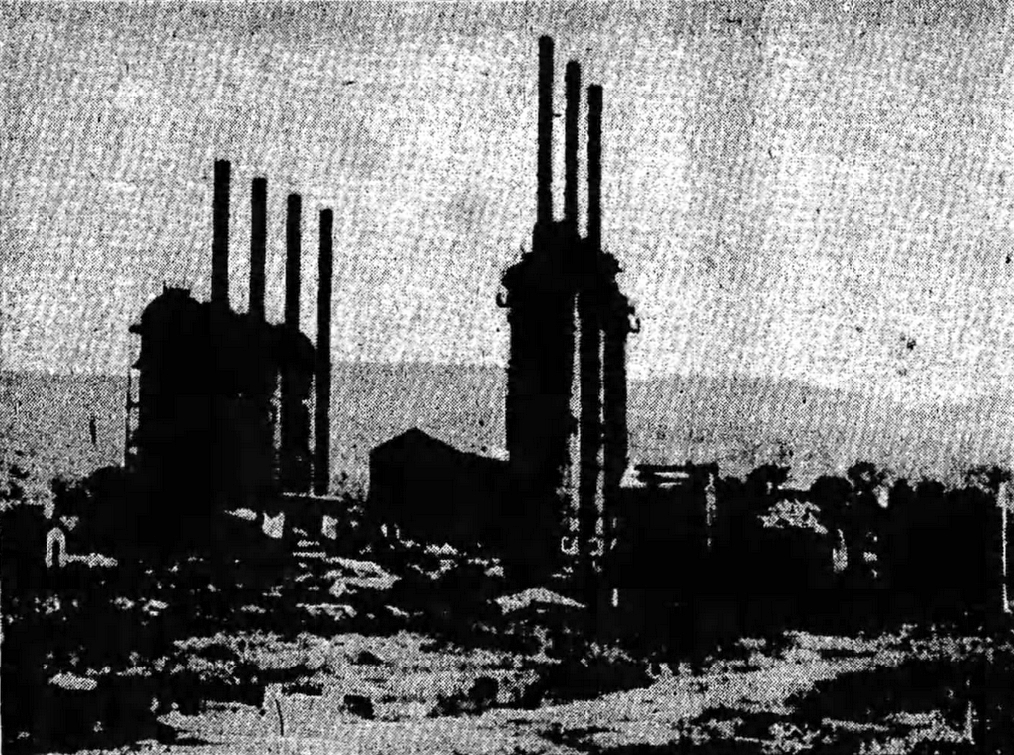
Poor-quality scan of a historic photograph of the Josephine Furnace in 1936, shortly before its demolition.

The Josephine Furnace was a blast furnace located in the company town of Josephine, Pennsylvania, in the United States. It was founded by Corrigan, McKinney & Co., a Cleveland, Ohio-based iron mining and shipping firm, as part of its push into the manufacture coke and pig iron. Planned as a coking facility, the owner decided to construct a blast furnace to take advantage of economic efficiencies by engaging in smelting where coke and coal were located. The furnace's construction led to the founding of the town of Josephine.

The Josephine Furnace remained in operation until 1927, when economic factors caused its shutdown. Ownership transferred to Republic Steel when that company purchased Corrigan, McKinney in 1934. The site was demolished for scrap in 1936.

== Background ==
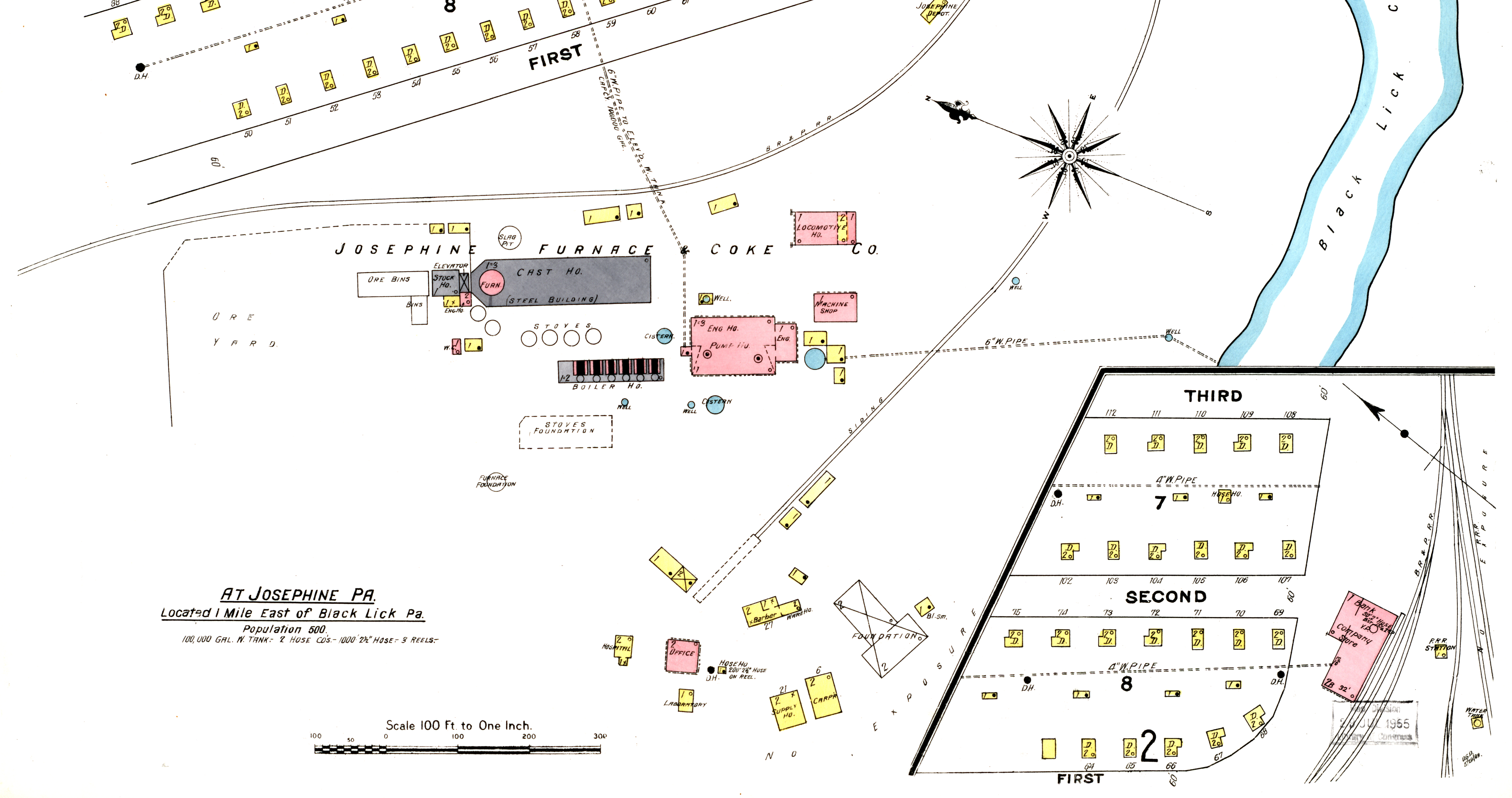
Layout of the Josephine Furnace in 1909.

Corrigan, McKinney & Co. was organized on March 17, 1894.

It moved into the manufacture of pig iron in June of that year, leasing the River Furnace (Note: "Furnace" is short for blast furnace.) of the Cleveland Iron Company, located in Cleveland, Ohio. Corrigan, McKinney & Co. obtained the Charlotte Furnace in Scottdale, Pennsylvania, in May 1895, the Douglas Furnace of Sharpsville, Pennsylvania, in May 1896, and the Genesee Furnace in Charlotte, New York, in June 1902.

Difficulties in obtaining a reliable supply of coke for its furnaces led Corrigan, McKinney to set up its own coking facility. In mid December 1902, it purchased the Jeffries farm on Tom's Run in Burrell Township in Indiana County, Pennsylvania. (Note: The farm was located about a fifth of a mile east of the intersection of what is now Strangford Road and Chestnut Ridge Road.) The company planned to erect 400 beehive coking ovens there, and build a "coal town" of 200 homes for the workers it would require. The H.L. Taylor farm adjacent to the Jeffries farm was purchased in February 1903. This provided space for an additional 200 homes, and the company intended to call the new town "Corrigan" after founder James Corrigan. (Note: The Taylor farm was also located near Strangford.) Although no work was done at the site by June 1903, by the end of the year there were a small number of coking ovens in operation and a coal washer under construction.

In February 1903, Corrigan, McKinney began purchasing large tracts of coal lands in Indiana County, Pennsylvania, to feed its new coke ovens. Some sources say the company purchased 4,000 acres (1,600 ha), others at 5,000 acres (2,000 ha) or 6,000 acres (2,400 ha), but press reports put the number at 10,141 acres (4,104 ha).

== Erecting the blast furnace ==
=== Anticipated coking facility ===
Work on the Jeffries farm location apparently stopped, as word spread that Corrigan, McKinney was making a major move into coking. The city of Sandusky, Ohio, offered the company $90,000 ($3,200,000 in 2025 dollars) to move the facility there, and the city of East Pittsburgh, Pennsylvania, offered $50,000 ($1,800,000 in 2025 dollars). (Note: There were extensive rumors that Corrigan, McKinney was going to build its blast furnace in West Pittsburg, Pennsylvania. In mid June 1905, media reports claimed that the company was going to spend $750,000 to erect a blast furnace capable of producing 350 tons of pig iron daily. There were even press reports that the company had purchased 10 acres of land, and was ready to let contracts for construction so that the furnace would be ready in 12 months.)

Arthur Gould Yates was president of the Buffalo, Rochester and Pittsburgh Railway (BR&P), and an early coal trading pioneer in Pennsylvania. With a coal mining boom under way in southwestern Pennsylvania, he sought to make his railroad one of the main transporters of coal and coke. Yates had already considered assisting a company in establishing a major new coking plant in Falls Creek, Pennsylvania. However, the railroad already owned a large tract of land near the village of Bell's Mills in Burrell Township, adjacent to its Indiana Branch. Next to the rail line was Blacklick Creek, which provided ample water for coking ovens. A blast furnace on the Indiana Line would revive that section of track, as well as lead to the development of nearby coal lands owned by the Iselin family (which happened to control the BR&P).

Yates contacted Corrigan, McKinney, and an agreement was soon reached: The railroad sold its undeveloped land to Corrigan, McKinney for a token amount of money, agreed to build a system of tracks and trestles to serve the new facility and the surrounding coal fields, and agreed to facilitate the sale of the village of Bell's Mills and surrounding land. On September 30, 1905, Corrigan, McKinney & Co. purchased a large piece of property owned by Anna M. Guthrie, the 100-acre (40 ha) adjacent "Dalzell tract", the village of Bell's Mills, (Note: Bell's Mills only had eight to 12 houses.) and another 50 to 60 acres (20 to 24 ha) of contiguous land for $40,000. Included in the deal was the grain mill which gave the village its name. The mill and village were razed.

The day the properties were purchased, Corrigan, McKinney announced it would construct a blast furnace at the place. The company had purchased the land for a coking operation, but realized efficiencies could be achieved by smelting ore in Pennsylvania where the coal and coke was, rather than in Cleveland. It also began construction on 165 new houses for its workers and managers.

=== Building the Josephine Furnace ===
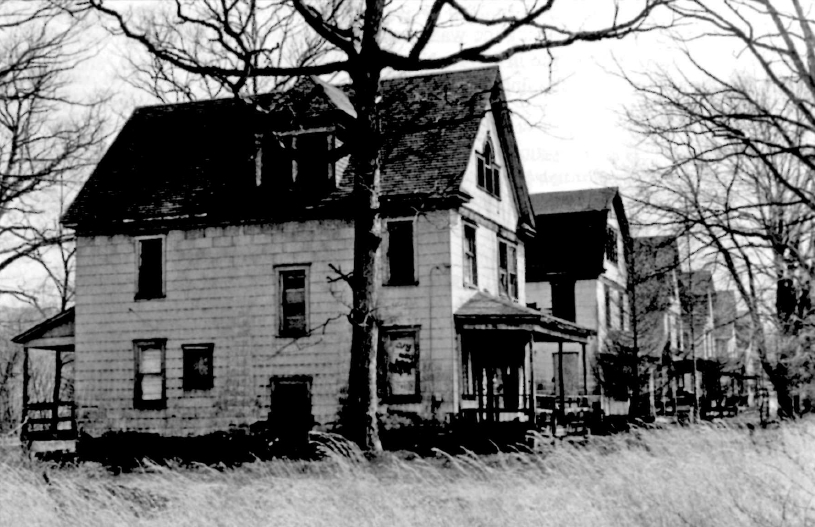
Residential housing in 1993 erected by Corrigan, McKinney & Co. in Josephine, Pennsylvania. Nicknamed "Millionaires Row" because only the families of supervisors and foremen of the Josephine Furnace Co. could live in them.

On October 14, ten days after announcing Corrigan, McKinney announced its land purchases, the Josephine Furnace Co. was incorporated by James Corrigan, Price McKinney, F.S. Burke Jr., J.E. Ferris, John A. Scott Jr., J. Wood Clark, and R.M. Mullen. It was capitalized at $800,000 ($28,700,000 in 2025 dollars).

The Josephine Furnace Co. began construction of a blast furnace on Blacklick Creek in March 1906 after some additional land acquisitions were made. (Note: Sources usually put the cost of the blast furnace at $1 million ($35,800,000 in 2025 dollars), but it seems that that figure includes land purchases as well.) This included the lease of more than 1,000 acres (400 ha) between the Devinney farm on Tom's Run and Blacklick Creek to connect the coke ovens to the furnace.

The location picked for the furnace consisted of 20 to 25 acres (8.1 to 10.1 ha) of land located on a U-shaped bend in the stream, just under 1 mile (1.6 km) southeast of where Blacklick Creek and Two Lick Creek met. Construction consisted of a blast furnace, several service buildings, a railroad siding, and four steel trestles to permit the unloading of iron ore, coke, coal, limestone, and other materials. On the west side of Two Lick and Black Lick creeks were the Indiana Branch of the Pennsylvania Railroad and the Indiana Branch of the BR&P. Between the blast furnace and Blacklick Creek on the south and east was the Cambria & Clearfield Division of the Pennsylvania Railroad. (Note: Indiana Branch of the Pennsylvania Railroad was completed from Blairsville Junction (the connection with the Pennsy's main line), three miles south of Blairsville, to Blairsville in 1851. The extension from Blairsville to Indiana began construction in 1853, and was completed on June 9, 1856. In January 1893, the Pennsylvania Railroad incorporated a subsidiary, the Ebensburg & Black Lick Railroad. It opened between Ebensburg and Vintondale on October 22, 1894. It was merged, along with several other Pennsy subsidiaries, in 1903 into the Cambria & Clearfield Railway (a.k.a. the Cambria Division). The Buffalo, Rochester & Pittsburg Railway, controlled by C. Oliver Iselin of the Iselin coal interests, began construction of its Indiana Branch from Punxsutawney south to Black Lick in April 1903. It paralleled the Indiana Branch of the Pennsy. The BR&P's Indiana Branch ended at Blacklick Junction; BR&P trains had trackage rights on the Pennsy's Indiana Branch south to Blairsville. The line to Black Lick Junction opened on July 18, 1904. The BR&P's construction of its Indiana Branch spurred the Pennsylvania Railroad to complete the line between Vintondale and Black Lick. Extension of the line began in October 1902, and it opened on June 1, 1904.)

In 1905, as part of the construction of the Josephine Furnace, Corrigan, McKinney & Co. constructed an 8-foot (2.4 m) reinforced concrete dam on Blacklick Creek. Its small reservoir provided water for furnace operations. At some point, the company also purchased a limestone quarry on Piney Creek near Royer to provide limestone for smelting operations. (Note: The Piney Creek quarry also served Corrigan, McKinney's Charlotte Furnace, a blast furnace located in Scottdale, Pennsylvania. When both furnaces were operating at capacity, the Piney Creek quarry would send out 90 to 100 rail cars a week of limestone.)

Excavations for the 300 coke ovens were partially finished by November 1906.

Construction on the new town on the Guthrie land also began in March 1906. It was named Josephine, after the wife of Corrigan, McKinney stockholder Edward Burke. Initially, the town had 140 houses, but 300 were eventually built. Nineteen of the homes were larger and more expensive, each costing $3,000 ($100,000 in 2025 dollars) to build. These were for plant managers and superintendents. The company also built a bank, a clothing and furnishings store, private offices for the company, a post office, and warehouse. Every home and commercial building had electricity, sewer, and running water.

The Josephine Furnace was blown in on January 14, 1907. The furnace had four stacks and a capacity of 100 short tons (91 t) a day. Steam was generated by nine Stirling boilers, with energy transferred to machinery in the mill via three compound vertical beam engines. Electricity was generated by small boilers made by the Ball Engine Company. It was idled in November 1911, and new blowing engines, boilers, and steam pipes installed. Extra electrical generators and pumps were also added.

It was the first modern, coke-fired blast furnace in Western Pennsylvania.

To supply the furnace with limestone, Corrigan, McKinney purchased two limestone quarries. The largest of these was on the Clover Creek Branch of the Pennsylvania Railroad, 2 miles (3.2 km) east of Williamsburg, Pennsylvania. This quarry, which began operation in April 1909, had four drills, a crusher, and conveyor belts that loaded 10 to 30 rail cars a day with stone. The smaller quarry, obtained in 1913, was 4 miles (6.4 km) east of the larger one and located on the Springfield Branch of the Pennsylvania Railroad.

=== Second blast furnace ===
A second blast furnace, with a daily capacity of 400 short tons (360 t) and an estimated construction cost of $1 million ($34,600,000 in 2025 dollars), began construction in April 1907. The Panic of 1907 paused construction for about nine months, but it resumed in July 1908 for two months. The Panic of 1910–11 caused construction to cease again, and was restarted only in April 1910. The furnace was finished in June 1910, but it was not placed in operation. It was rushed to completion in March 1911, and blown in that summer.

== Operation ==
In 1913, the Pennsylvania Railroad sued the Josephine Furnace for failing to unload ore cars fast enough and return them to service. A jury agreed, and awarded the railroad $10,961.34.

A major flood in March 1914 damaged the Josephine Furnace dam severely, as well as left the rail yard at the mill under 3 to 4 feet (0.91 to 1.22 m) of water. What remained of the dam was washed away during another flood in 1977.

1914 also saw the Bollinger-Andrews Construction Company of Pittsburgh move its plant to Josephine. It purchased 18 acres (7.3 ha) of land adjacent to the blast furnace in June, and construction was well under way by December. The new plant opened on March 1, 1915.

The No. 1 Furnace at Josephine closed in August 1914 for two months for regular relining. The No. 2 Furnace then unexpectedly shut down two weeks later after an undisclosed mechanical failure. The No. 2 Furnace had to be rebuilt in large part, and did not reopen until June 1915.

While the furnace was partially shut down, Corrigan, McKinney & Co. built a new ingot mill at the Josephine site. It was ready for operation at the start of 1915.

After this initial burst of activity at Josephine Furnace, operations entered a more regular pattern. The Josephine Furnace Co. was dissolved in January 1918 when Corrigan, McKinney changed its name to the McKinney Steel Co. The blast furnace was directly owned by McKinney Steel, and no longer owned by an independent entity.

Furnace operations peaked in the 1910s. During this time, Josephine Furnace regularly employed 200 workers and produced 600 short tons (540 t) tons of pig iron a day. In the middle of 1921, however, the plant shut down completely during the post-World War I recession of 1920–1921. It did not resume production again until January 1923.

Corrigan, McKinney dismantled two of the large blowing engines and moved them Cleveland in November 1925. Limited repair of the furnaces was made in December. The furnace operated in the early part of 1926, but shut down again in August. Both furnaces were shut down again in 1927 and never restarted.

The Josephine Furnace was sold for scrap in June 1936, and demolished in November 1936.

== Historic nature ==
The Bollinger-Andrews foundry site and the Josephine Furnace site are both listed as Historic Engineering Sites by the United States Department of the Interior. The Josephine Furnace once consisted of the two furnaces, a blow room (where air is forced through molten iron ore to remove excess carbon), cisterns, a compressor building, dam, engine house, machine shop, pump house, several railroad trestles, supply building, time keeper's building, and a water treatment plant. All that remains as of 1993 are the dam abutments, engine house, pump house, and a coal/coke/ore unloading trestle.

A street of residences at the south end of the town of Josephine was erected to house the families of supervisors and foremen who worked at the Josephine Furnace. Nicknamed "Millionaires Row" by local residents, most of these residences also still exist.

== Bibliography ==
- American Iron and Steel Association (1890). Directory of Iron and Steel Works of the United States and Canada. Philadelphia: Allen, Lane & Scott. OCLC 2092992.
- Quin, Richard H. (1993). Indiana County, Pennsylvania: An Inventory of Historic Engineering and Industrial Sites (PDF). Washington, D.C.: Historic American Buildings Survey/Historic American Engineering Record. OCLC 27432667.
- Schotter, H.W. (1927). Growth and Development of the Pennsylvania Railroad Company. Philadelphia: Press of Allen, Lane & Scott. OCLC 7109166.
- Sipes, William B. (1875). The Pennsylvania Railroad: Its Origin, Construction, Condition, and Connections. Philadelphia: Pennsylvania Railroad Co. OCLC 1080746.
- Wilson, William Bender (1899). History of the Pennsylvania Railroad Company: With Plan of Organization, Portraits of Officials, and Biographical Sketches. Philadelphia: H.T. Coates. OCLC 17762229.
