= Ghost Town Trail =

- Length: 36 mi (58 km)
- Established: 1991
- Designation: National Recreation Trail; National Register of Historic Places
- Difficulty: Easy

The Ghost Town Trail is a rail trail in Western Pennsylvania that runs 36 miles (58 km) between Black Lick, Indiana County, and Ebensburg, Cambria County. Established in 1991 on the right-of-way of the former Ebensburg and Black Lick Railroad, the trail follows the Blacklick Creek and passes through many ghost towns that were abandoned in the early 1900s with the decline of the local coal mining industry. Open year-round to cycling, hiking, and cross-country skiing, the trail is designated a National Recreation Trail by the United States Department of the Interior.

== Development ==
Construction of the trail began in 1991 after the Kovalchick Salvage Company of Indiana, Pennsylvania, donated 16 mi (26 km) of the Ebensburg and Blacklick Railroad to Indiana County, 12 mi (19 km) of which between Dilltown and Nanty Glo were used for the trail. In 1993, the Cambria and Indiana Railroad donated the Rexis Branch, 4 mi (6.4 km) between Rexis near Vintondale and White Mill Station at U.S. Route 422. Another 20 mi (32 km) were added in 2005, extending the trail 12 mi (19 km) west from Dilltown to Black Lick, and 8 mi (13 km) east from Nanty Glo to Ebensburg. In 2016, it was extended again to include Cardiff.

== Historical sites ==
The trail passes many historical sites, particularly sites of abandoned coal mines and their company towns. The ghost towns include Bracken, Armerford, Lackawanna No. 3, Wehrum, Scott Glenn, Webster, Beulah (or Beula), and Claghorn.

=== Wehrum ===
Wehrum, the largest of the former towns, once contained 230 houses, a hotel, company store, jail, bank, post office, school, and two churches. It was founded in 1901 by Warren Delano, uncle of Franklin Delano Roosevelt, for the Lackawanna Iron and Coal Company, which opened mines in the area. When the mines declined and closed in the 1930s, the town was abandoned. Only one of the houses is still standing, across from the site of the hotel and the remains of the bank vault. One of the few other remnants of Wehrum is a Russian Orthodox Church cemetery that sits in the woods above the trail; the last burials took place in 1927. The trail follows the Pennsylvania Railroad's Ebensburg & Blacklick line past Wehrum, which opened in 1903.

=== Claghorn ===
Construction of Claghorn by Lackawanna Coal began in 1903. Due to an economic downturn, work was suspended in 1904. The Vinton Colliery Company purchased the partially built town in 1916 and opened six mines in the area. The company constructed 84 houses, a three-story 22 room hotel, a building that served as a school and theater, and a company store. The Ebensburg-Black Lick line of the Pennsylvania Railroad extended past Claghorn. The mines were closed in 1924, and houses were rented until after World War II when the town was abandoned.

=== Buena Vista Furnace ===
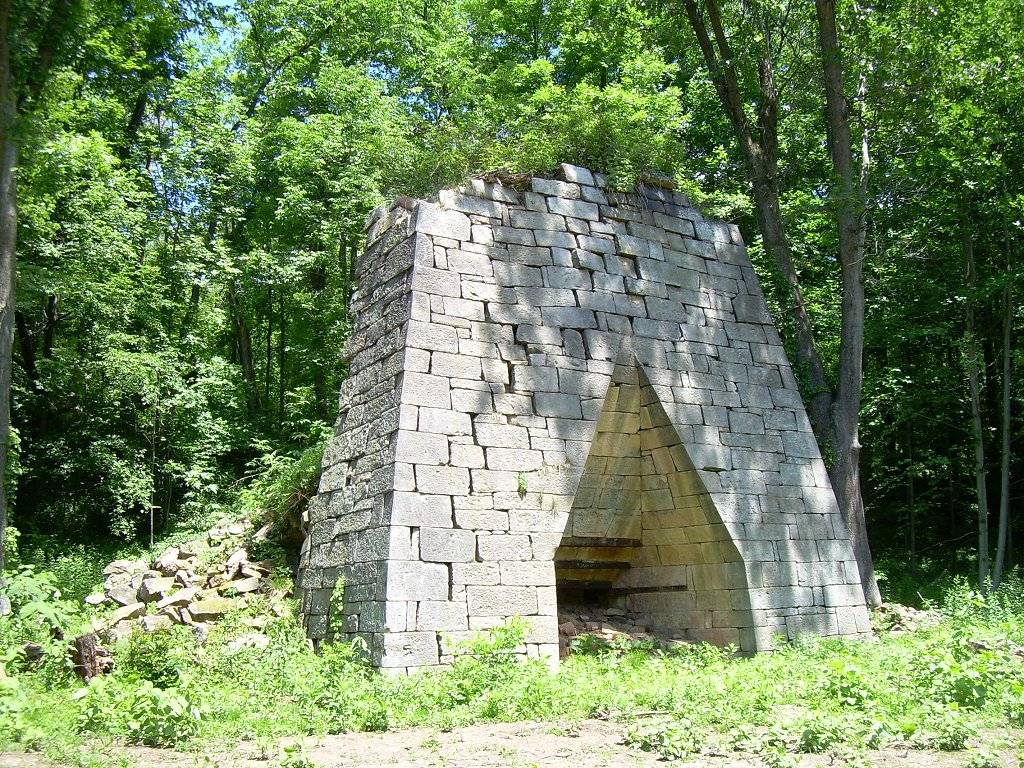
Buena Vista Furnace, 2007

Named after the Mexican–American War's Battle of Buena Vista, the hot blast iron furnace was built in 1847. The thirty-foot furnace used iron ore, limestone, and charcoal mined nearby to produce up to 400 tons of pig iron per year. The operation was started by partners Henry McClelland, Elias McClelland, and Stephen Johnson who acquired 30 acres (120,000 m^{2}) along the Blacklick Creek. The property containing the furnace eventually totaled 822 acres (3.33 km^{2}) and included a sawmill and several boarding houses to accommodate the more than 60 workers.

As early as 1850, the furnace was struggling financially and forced to close. Ownership passed to Dr. Alexander Johnson, who sought experienced individuals to run the furnace. When Johnson died in 1874, he stipulated that his estate be divided amongst his three children. The courts ruled that the estate "could not be parted or divided ... without injury to or prejudice to or spoiling the whole thereof." The Court awarded the property to Johnson's son Stephen, one of the original partners in the project. On February 17, 1901, the property was sold to Judge A.V. Barker on behalf of the Lackawanna Iron and Steel Company, who acquired a total of over 20,000 acres (81 km^{2}) of coal land in Indiana and Cambria counties. The deed passed to Warren Delano and his Delano Coal Company, established as a subsidiary of Lackawanna Steel.

Facing financial troubles during the Great Depression, the mines were shut down. A civic group, the Buena Vista Furnace Park Association, was organized shortly after in hopes of acquiring the furnace to create a public historical park. According to the group, an attempt was made by Henry Ford to obtain the furnace for his Greenfield Village project. On November 5, 1957, the Delano Coal Company sold the property to the Historical & Genealogical Society of Indiana County.

Due to difficult access and a flood in 1977, repairs had been minimal until the trail was extended past the site in 2005. The furnace is located along the trail in Brush Valley Township, Indiana County, about one-half mile west of PA 56.

=== Eliza Furnace ===
- Eliza Furnace
- U.S. National Register of Historic Places
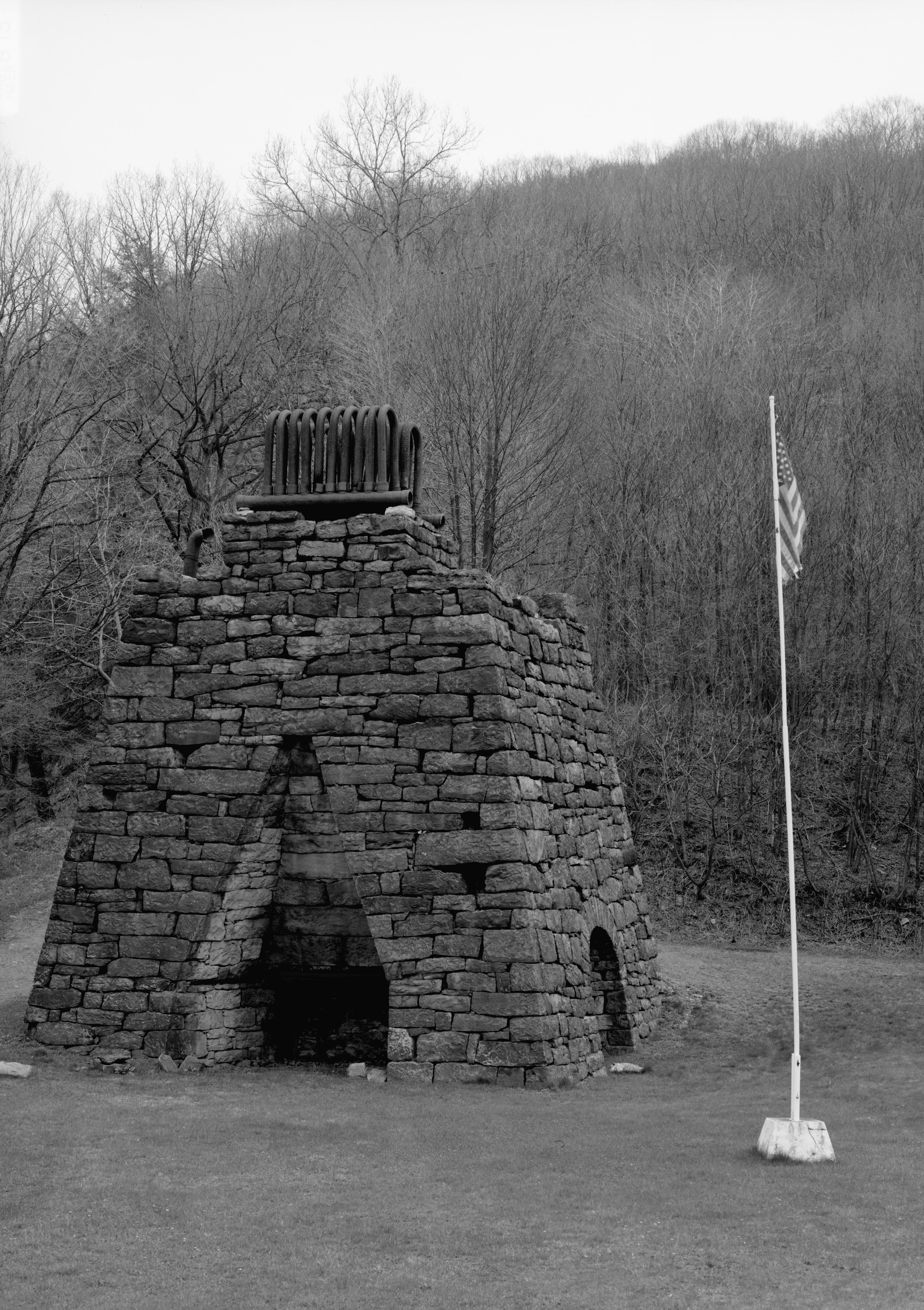
- Front of Eliza Furnace

- Location within Pennsylvania Location within the United States
- Location: Vintondale, Pennsylvania
- Coordinates: 40°29′3″N 78°55′20″W
- Built: 1846
- NRHP reference No.: 91001138

Significant dates
- Added to NRHP: September 6, 1991
- Designated: Structure

The Eliza Furnace, also known as Ritter's Furnace, operated between 1846 and 1849. It is one of the best-preserved hot blast iron furnaces in Pennsylvania, one of the first in the area, and is on the National Register of Historic Places. At its peak the furnace produced about 1,080 tons of iron annually, employed over 90 men and boys, and used 45 mules.

During the 1830s and 1840s, partners David Ritter and George Rodgers acquired several thousand acres in the Blacklick Valley and began construction of the furnace in 1845. Before completion, Rodgers sold his share to Lot Irvin, a farmer from Centre County. The furnace was one of the region's first to use the hot blast method. After the iron was produced at Eliza, it was carried by wagon to Nineveh (modern day Seward) in Westmoreland County or Johnstown, where it was transported by the Pennsylvania Canal to Pittsburgh. In 1848 the furnace produced over 1000 out of an estimated capacity of 1800 tons of iron. But the operation soon began to decline.

The furnace operation encompassed 231 acres (0.93 km^{2}), though Ritter and Irvin owned much more. The property included many related buildings such as a casting house and a stove house, twenty-one log homes, a wagon shop, smoke house, stable, sawmill, boarding house, and store. The employees were often paid in kind rather than in cash. The furnace was never able to achieve a profit and was forced to close for several reasons: the Pennsylvania Railroad chose the Conemaugh Valley for its new route rather than the Blacklick, the furnace utilized outdated technologies, and the cost of hauling iron to the Canal was high. David Ritter experienced financial problems, losing property in Armagh as payment when sued by former partner George Rodgers for $350. In July 1848, the property was seized and sold at sheriff's sale to Soloman Alter and Joseph Replier of Philadelphia. After being purchased by Alter and Replier, the property passed hands many times before ultimately passing from Manor Realty of the Pennsylvania Railroad to the Cambria County Historical Society.

The furnace is located at Vintondale, near the midpoint of the trail. The site also contains a picnic area, restrooms, and historical signs.

== Economic impact and funding ==
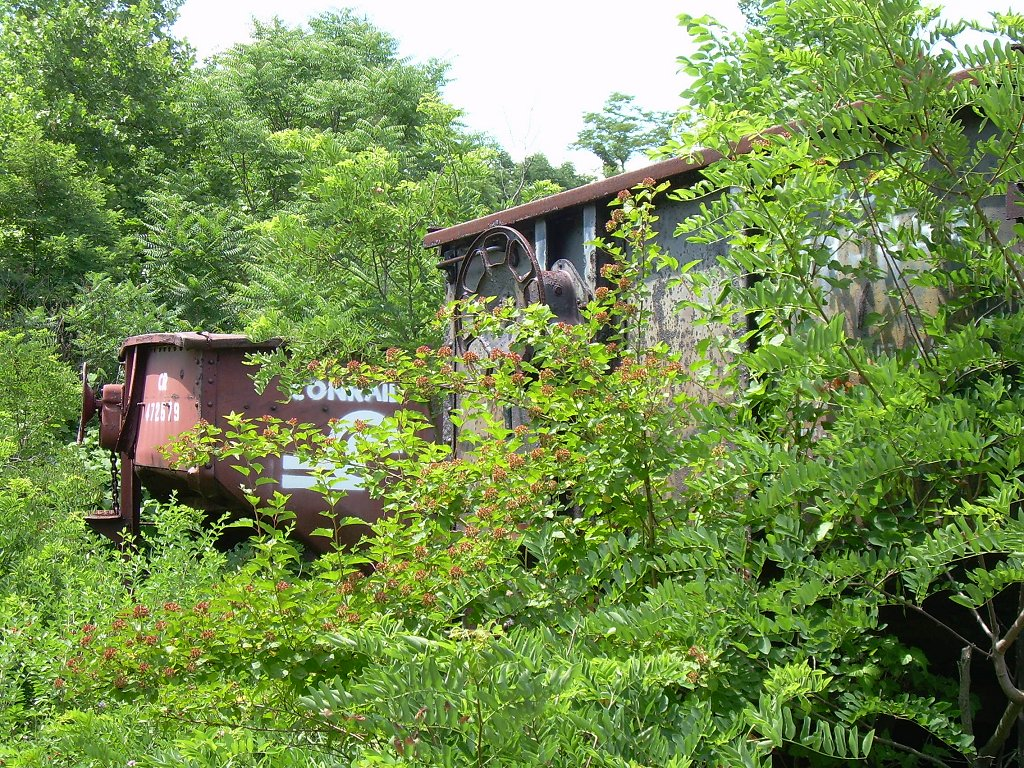
Abandoned coal cars along the trail

In October 1996, interns from the Southwestern Pennsylvania Heritage Preservation Commission and Penn State's School of Forest Resources completed an economic impact study of the trail. The study concluded that the trail is providing a positive impact on the region. Average daily expenditures of resident visitors was $4.33 per day while non-residents spent $9.28 daily. Attendance during the May to October period was 66,000, of which 23% were from outside of Cambria and Indiana counties. The overall impact of the trail during the period totaled $362,000.

The trail obtained much of the property through donated rights-of-way. Since its establishment, the trail has been supported by the Keystone Grant Funding, a program that will match a donation from a variety of private, local, state, and federal groups.

== Trail access points ==
Access	Location	Mileage	Elevation
Saylor Park; Black Lick	1-mile (1.6 km) from U.S. Route 119	0 miles (0 km)	980 feet (300 m)
Heshbon	PA Route 259	6.5 miles (10.5 km)	1,260 feet (380 m)
Dilltown	PA Route 403	13 miles (21 km)	1,350 feet (410 m)
Wehrum	Vintondale Rd.	16 miles (26 km)	1,355 feet (413 m)
Vintondale; Eliza Furnace	Vintondale Rd.	19 miles (31 km)	1,360 feet (410 m)
Twin Rocks	PA Route 271	22 miles (35 km)	1,660 feet (510 m)
Nanty Glo	PA Route 271	25 miles (40 km)	1,720 feet (520 m)
Ebensburg	U.S. Route 422	33 miles (53 km)	2,000 feet (610 m)
