= Pennsylvania Route 259 =

State highway in Pennsylvania, US

Pennsylvania Route 259

Route information
- Maintained by PennDOT
- Length: 33.4 mi (53.8 km)

Major junctions
- South end: US 30 west of Ligonier
- US 22 in West Wheatfield Township; PA 56 in Brush Valley Township
- North end: US 422 in Yellow Creek State Park

Location
- Country: United States
- State: Pennsylvania
- Counties: Westmoreland, Indiana

Highway system
- Pennsylvania State Route System; Interstate; US; State; Scenic; Legislative
← PA 258	→ PA 260

Pennsylvania Route 259 (PA 259) is a 33.4-mile-long (53.8 km) state highway located in Westmoreland and Indiana counties in Pennsylvania. The southern terminus is at U.S. Route 30 (US 30) west of Ligonier. The northern terminus is at US 422 in Cherryhill Township on the border of Yellow Creek State Park.

== Route description ==
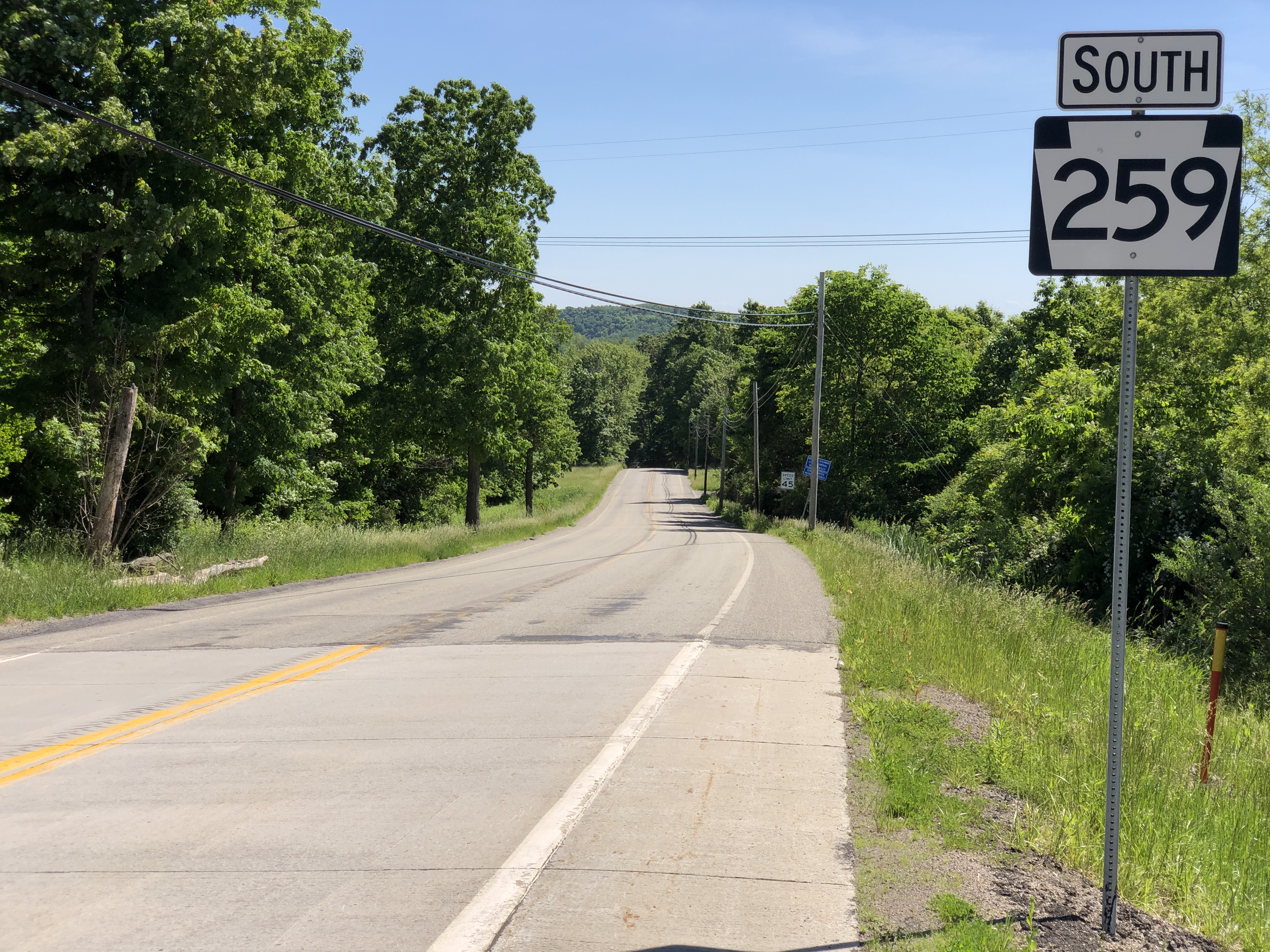
PA 259 southbound past US 22 in West Wheatfield Township

PA 259 begins at an intersection with US 30 in the community of Millbank in Ligonier Township, Westmoreland County, heading north-northeast on a two-lane undivided road. The route heads through wooded areas, turning east into more woodland with some farm fields and homes. The road curves to the north-northeast again, winding northeast through more rural areas. PA 259 heads north-northeast through more agricultural areas with some woods and residences, curving northeast again as it crosses into Fairfield Township. The route winds through more farmland and woodland with occasional homes, turning to the north before curving northwest. The road heads into woodland with a few farm fields, turning north before heading northeast. PA 259 winds north through more wooded areas, becoming Midget Camp Road as it curves northeast and north again through woodland with some homes, becoming unnamed again. The road passes through the residential community of West Bolivar before turning east and crossing the Tubmill Creek into the borough of Bolivar. Here, the route becomes Market Street and runs north-northeast past homes. PA 259 turns east-southeast onto 2nd Street and passes more residences and businesses before turning north-northeast onto Market Street and passing under a low (9'4") clearance under Norfolk Southern's Pittsburgh Line. The road curves to the east and runs between the Conemaugh River to the north and the railroad tracks to the south, heading back into Fairfield Township. After curving north to pass under Norfolk Southern's Conemaugh Line, the route turns east onto Front Street and continues between the river and the railroad tracks, turning north.

PA 259 crosses the Conemaugh River into West Wheatfield Township in Indiana County and becomes High Street, passing through the residential community of Robinson. The road curves east and becomes Robinson Street, passing more homes before heading northeast into woodland with occasional residences. The route turns north and runs through more wooded areas with some fields and homes, becoming unnamed and curving northeast. PA 259 crosses US 22 and continues northeast through more rural areas. The road winds north and crosses the Blacklick Creek into Brush Valley Township, passing through Heshbon. The route runs north-northeast through farmland and woodland with some homes, turning to the north. PA 259 heads into open agricultural areas with some residences and turns east, entering the residential community of Brush Valley. Here, the route turns north to form a concurrency with PA 56 before turning to the east. The road heads east-northeast through more farmland with some woods and homes, passing through Rico. PA 259 enters dense forests and turns north at Suncliff. The road continues through more wooded areas and becomes the eastern border of Yellow Creek State Park, fully entering the park as it turns east and runs to the south of Yellow Creek Lake. PA 259 heads northeast into Cherryhill Township and ends at an intersection with US 422.

== Major intersections ==
County	Location	mi	km	Destinations	Notes
Westmoreland	Ligonier Township	0.0– 0.1	0.0– 0.16	US 30 (Lincoln Highway)	Southern terminus
Indiana	West Wheatfield Township	20.4	32.8	US 22 (William Penn Highway) – Blairsville, Ebensburg	Interchange
Indiana	Brush Valley Township	27.9	44.9	PA 56 east – Armagh	Eastern terminus of PA 56 concurrency
Indiana	Brush Valley Township	28.0	45.1	PA 56 west – Homer City	Western terminus of PA 56 concurrency
Indiana	Cherryhill Township	33.4	53.8	US 422 (Benjamin Franklin Highway) – Indiana, Ebensburg	Northern terminus
1.000 mi = 1.609 km; 1.000 km = 0.621 mi: Concurrency terminus
