= Blacklick =

Blacklick and Black Lick may refer to:

Communities:

- Blacklick, Ohio, an unincorporated village in Jefferson Township, Franklin County
- Black Lick, Pennsylvania, a census-designated place (CDP) in Indiana County
- Black Lick Township, Pennsylvania
- Blacklick Township, Cambria County, Pennsylvania

Streams:

- Blacklick Creek (Ohio), a tributary of Big Walnut Creek
- Blacklick Creek (Pennsylvania), a tributary of the Conemaugh River
