= John Brallier =

American football player and coach (1876–1960)

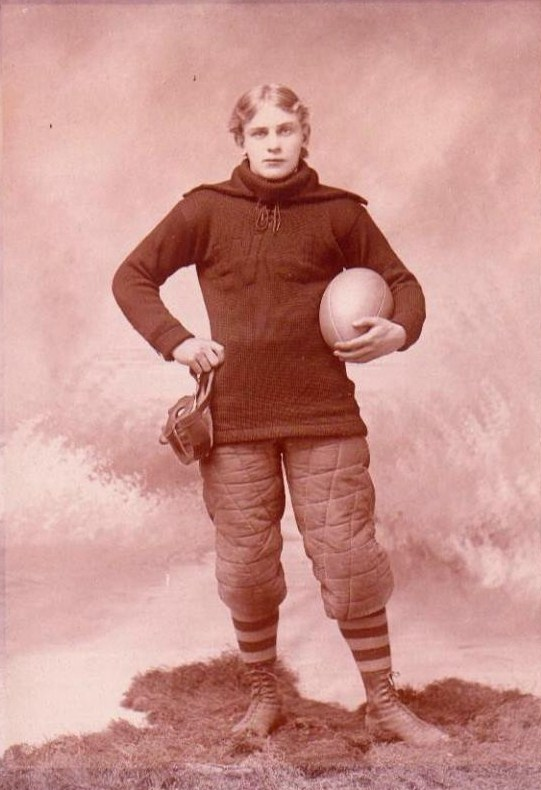
- Brallier in uniform for Washington & Jefferson, circa 1895

Profile
- Position: Quarterback

Personal information
- Born: December 27, 1876; Cherry Tree, Pennsylvania, U.S.
- Died: September 17, 1960 (aged 83); Latrobe, Pennsylvania, U.S.

Career information
- College: Washington & Jefferson College; West Virginia University; Medico-Chirurgical College; Indiana Normal School Note: Brallier never attended Indiana Normal, but still played on its football team

Career history

Playing
- 1895–1896: Latrobe Athletic Association
- 1896: Punxsutawney, Pennsylvania
- 1898: Pittsburgh Athletic Club
- 1898: Latrobe Athletic Association
- 1902–1907: Latrobe Athletic Association

Coaching
- 1896, 1902–1907: Latrobe Athletic Association

Awards and highlights
- First openly paid professional football player; 3× W. Pennsylvania Circuit champion (1903, 1904, 1905); 4× undefeated seasons: (1902, 1903, 1904, 1905); Pro coaching record: 36–3–4

Other information
- Military career
- Allegiance: United States
- Branch: U.S. Army
- Service years: 1898
- Conflicts: Spanish–American War

John Kinport "Sal" Brallier (December 12, 1876 – September 17, 1960) was one of the first professional American football players. He was nationally acknowledged as the first openly paid professional football player when he was given $10 to play for the Latrobe Athletic Association for a game against the Jeanette Athletic Association in 1895.

== Early life ==
Brallier was born in Cherry Tree, Pennsylvania, near the city of Indiana. He was the son of Dr. Emanuel Brallier, a physician, and his wife, Lucy M. Kinport Brallier. His grandparents were from Alsace-Lorraine, accounting for the French-sounding name. As a boy, Brallier remembered having worked in a glass factory. His first recollection of football was in 1890, at the age of 13, playing in high school for the West Indiana Public School team. By his sophomore year in 1892, he was the captain and right halfback.

In 1893, while still attending high school, Brallier also played quarterback for the Indiana Normal football club in 1893 and 1894. The team won three of four games played that year. Among his teammates was left guard Alex Stewart, future father of movie star James Stewart. During the fourth game of the 1894 season, Normal lost, 28–0, to Washington & Jefferson College. However, Brallier's outstanding play led the Presidents coach E. Gard Edwards to write from Pittsburgh asking Brallier to play football for his team.

Further correspondence followed through the winter between Brallier and Washington & Jefferson Presidents manager H. Wilson Boyd. The result was that Brallier agreed to go to Washington & Jefferson "if all expenses are paid for the entire year." The young football star graduated from Indiana Public School that spring and was awaiting the start of college when something happened 30 miles away in Latrobe, Pennsylvania that was to affect his career and the rest of his life.

== Football career ==
=== Pro football pioneer ===
In 1895 the town of Latrobe established a formal football team. However, just before the start of the season, Latrobe quarterback Eddie Blair found himself in a scheduling conflict. Blair, who also played baseball in nearby Greensburg discovered that the team's first football game against the Jeannette Athletic Club conflicted with a prior baseball commitment. Manager David Berry, who was now seeking a replacement for Blair, had heard of Brallier's performance as Indiana Normal's quarterback. He contacted the seventeen-year-old at his home in Indiana and offered him expenses to play for Latrobe. However, Brallier was not particularly anxious to play, anticipating his entrance into Washington & Jefferson College in a few weeks. The young quarterback was afraid that an injury would jeopardize his scholarship, so the Latrobe offered to pay him to "make it worthwhile".

Finally, Berry offered $10 a game plus expenses, while promising several other games and he threw in "some cakes". This offer made Brallier the first openly paid football player. The quarterback arrived in Latrobe the night before the game and practiced with the team under a street light. Latrobe would go on to win the game. Brallier kicked two field goals for a final score of 12–0.

While Brallier was considered the first professional football player and deemed a national icon for many years, it was not until after his death in 1960 that evidence proved John Brallier was not in fact the first professional football player, but merely the first one to openly admit he was paid. William "Pudge" Heffelfinger of the Allegheny Athletic Association is now considered the first professional player.

=== College career ===
Brallier remained with Latrobe for a second game against an Altoona squad before leaving for college. Brallier promptly won the varsity quarterback position at Washington & Jefferson, and made his first start for the Presidents on September 28, 1895, against Denison University. Washington & Jefferson won the game 32–0. The 1895 Washington & Jefferson team won six games, tied Penn State University, and lost only to the Pittsburgh Athletic Club, which was composed of former college stars. After the Washington & Jefferson season, Brallier returned to Latrobe to play another game, against Greensburg Athletic Association on November 30, 1895, which ended in a 4–0 loss. Brallier suffered an injury late in the game.

Going into the 1896 season, Brallier had nine different offers from schools, colleges, and athletic clubs to play football for them. Both Washington & Jefferson and Latrobe wanted him to return, and his services also were sought by West Virginia University, Grove City College, The Kiski School, Indiana Normal, Johnstown Athletic Club, Allegheny Athletic Association, and the Pittsburgh Athletic Club.

He accepted the West Virginia University offer, since he wanted to continue his education and the Mountaineers' offer was better than other schools could offer. However, he later stated that "unfortunately, the football management got into financial difficulties and could not take care of their men as promised." Brallier and two other players left after four games, one with Geneva College and three with Lafayette College, had been played. Brallier had captained the team and "Doggie" Trenchard, a former All-American from Princeton was the Mountaineer's coach. After the Lafayette game, Brallier accepted a Latrobe Athletic Association's offer to serve as its quarterback and coach.

=== Returning to the pro ranks ===
After Latrobe's season, Brallier received an offer from a hotel proprietor who managed Punxsutawney's team to assemble some football talent to play for Punxsutawney in a deciding third game with rival DuBois. After a week of practice and occupancy of the hotel's third floor, the game at DuBois lasted only 12 minutes before a riot ended play with Punxsutawney leading, 12–0. Both teams had outsiders with Latrobe's Harry Ryan and Ed Abbaticchio joining Brallier. The problem arose when the officials disallowed a DuBois score, although Punxsutawney's captain, Lawson Fiscus, offered to start the game anew with no score. Speculation was that the riot gave DuBois a chance to escape what may have been a rather sound drubbing in a game on which great amounts of money had been wagered. Brallier returned to Latrobe for the 1897 season.

On May 11, 1898, during the Spanish–American War, Brallier entered the U.S. Army. Although he was not mustered out until November, he was stationed near Latrobe for football season. He signed a contract to play for Latrobe for $150 and expenses for the season. He played three games, then left in mid-October to join the Pittsburgh Athletic Club at an increase in salary. After the Pittsburgh team's season was over he rejoined Latrobe for a final game against the Greensburg Athletic Association.

=== Second college career ===
In the fall of 1899, Brallier received an offer from the University of Pennsylvania to play quarterback. However, Penn had worried that Brallier had played so much professional ball that the school's amateur standing would be at stake. Pennsylvania was trying quite hard to get Harvard on their schedule. However, Harvard had refused to play Penn on the grounds that some of Quakers' players were not amateurs.

After the Penn incident Brallier toured the city's dental schools and decided to attend Medico-Chirurgical College, from where his older brother had graduated the year before. Ironically Medico-Chi, as it was called, later became part of the University of Pennsylvania. Before leaving for school that fall, Brallier helped coach the Indiana Normal team and turned down a Latrobe offer. Brallier had planned to give up football for his studies. However, pressure from the football coach and squad members changed his mind. Brallier was elected captain and quarterbacked the school's undefeated team which wound up gloriously with a win over rival Jefferson Medical College.

During the summers of 1899 and 1900, John Brallier worked with the surveying corps of Lackawanna Iron & Steel Company. In 1900, he helped lay out the town of Wehrum south of Vintondale, Pennsylvania in Cambria County. Before the 1900 season, Brallier had an offer from the University of Maryland to take up the coaching position." He refused it, stating that he wanted to dedicate more time to his studies. He returned to Medico-Chi and captained another undefeated team in its regular schedule. He graduated in 1902 with a degree in Orthodontia.

=== Returning again to the pro ranks ===
Brallier rejoined the Latrobe football team as player-coach for 1902. He had turned down pro football offers from the Franklin Athletic Club and Oil City Athletic Club, located in northwestern Pennsylvania. From 1903 to 1905 Brallier led Latrobe to three straight undefeated seasons. Including wins against the Canton Bulldogs, who later became a founding member of the National Football League. Brallier wrote in retrospect in 1934 that the 1903 Latrobe backfield "was the best I had ever played with and the best I have ever seen." In 1906 the team began to experience financial problems. Brallier finished his career in 1907 and was considered as one of the best players of his era, right alongside Pudge Heffelfinger. In 1907, the decrease in community interest and the team's change to an amateur club status coincided with his last year as a player, although he continued to help coach local town teams.

== After football ==
Brallier went on to practice dentistry, and served the community during a 20-year tenure as a school director, from which he retired at the end of 1931.

In the 1930s, Latrobe was recognized by the National Football League as the birthplace of professional football, and Dr. Brallier was given lifetime passes for all National Football League games. Latrobe became a candidate for the proposed Pro Football Hall of Fame but the Hall went to Canton, Ohio.

In March 1941, tragedy struck when his wife was killed in an automobile accident.

Brallier spent his time, after his 1946 retirement from professional life, in parts of Canada and Florida. He enjoyed his recognition as one of the first professional football players.

When he died on September 17, 1960, at age 84, he was the last surviving member of the Latrobe football team. He was buried at the Oakland Cemetery in Indiana, Pennsylvania.

In 1979, John Brallier was voted one of the "Best Pros Not in the Hall of Fame" by the Pro Football Researchers Association.

== Family ==
In February 1904, Brallier's engagement to Bess Garnette Moorhead of Indiana was announced, and a wedding followed on April 7. Their children were John K. Brallier Jr., Betty (Brallier) Allison and Nancy (Brallier) Cook.
