= Buffington Township, Pennsylvania =

Township in Pennsylvania, US

Coordinates: 40°29′30″N 79°00′30″W

- Township
- Cemetery at Wehrum

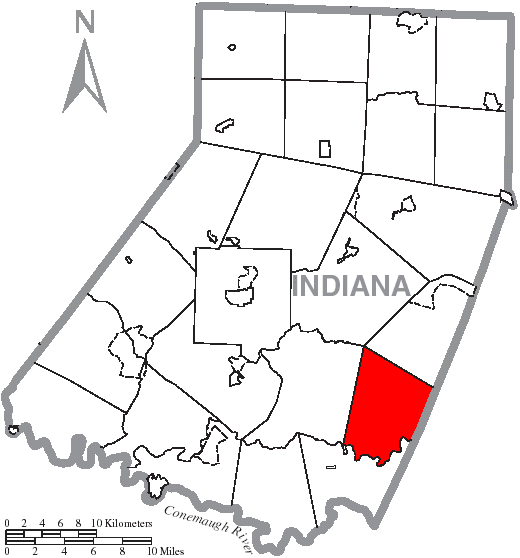
- Map of Indiana County, Pennsylvania Highlighting Buffington Township

- Map of Pennsylvania highlighting Indiana County
- Country: United States
- State: Pennsylvania
- County: Indiana

Area
  - Total: 30.67 sq mi (79.44 km^{2})
  - Land: 30.50 sq mi (79.00 km^{2})
  - Water: 0.17 sq mi (0.44 km^{2})
- Elevation: 994 ft (303 m)

Population (2020)
  - Total: 1,242 ▼
  - Estimate (2021): 1,236
  - Density: 42.3/sq mi (16.34/km^{2})
- Time zone: UTC-5 (Eastern (EST))
  - Summer (DST): UTC-4 (EDT)
- FIPS code: 42-063-10104

Buffington Township is a township in Indiana County, Pennsylvania, United States. Buffington Township split from Pine Township in 1867 and was named after Judge Joseph Buffington. The population was 1,242 at the 2020 census. It includes the communities of Blaides, Croft, Dilltown, Rexis, Scott Glen, Stumpf's Mills, and Wehrum.

== History ==
The Eliza Furnace was listed on the National Register of Historic Places in 1991.

== Geography ==
According to the United States Census Bureau, the township has a total area of 30.7 square miles (80 km^{2}), of which 30.5 square miles (79 km^{2}) is land and 0.2 square miles (0.52 km^{2}) (0.55%) is water.

== Demographics ==
Historical population
Census	Pop.	Note	%±
1870	877		—
1880	819		−6.6%
1890	652		−20.4%
1900	653		0.2%
1910	1,287		97.1%
1920	2,021		57.0%
1930	836		−58.6%
1940	1,129		35.0%
1950	965		−14.5%
1960	928		−3.8%
1970	909		−2.0%
1980	1,261		38.7%
1990	1,217		−3.5%
2000	1,275		4.8%
2010	1,328		4.2%
2020	1,242		−6.5%
2021 (est.)	1,236		−0.5%
U.S. Decennial Census

As of the census of 2000, there were 1,275 people, 469 households, and 370 families residing in the township. The population density was 41.8 inhabitants per square mile (16.1/km^{2}). There were 517 housing units at an average density of 17.0/sq mi (6.5/km^{2}). The racial makeup of the township was 99.45% White, 0.08% African American, 0.31% Native American, and 0.16% from two or more races. Hispanic or Latino of any race were 0.31% of the population.

There were 469 households, out of which 30.7% had children under the age of 18 living with them, 66.1% were married couples living together, 7.0% had a female householder with no husband present, and 21.1% were non-families. 17.9% of all households were made up of individuals, and 7.5% had someone living alone who was 65 years of age or older. The average household size was 2.72 and the average family size was 3.06.

In the township the population was spread out, with 23.7% under the age of 18, 9.6% from 18 to 24, 29.5% from 25 to 44, 26.4% from 45 to 64, and 10.8% who were 65 years of age or older. The median age was 37 years. For every 100 females there were 107.7 males. For every 100 females age 18 and over, there were 101.0 males.

The median income for a household in the township was $34,118, and the median income for a family was $38,625. Males had a median income of $29,904 versus $20,083 for females. The per capita income for the township was $15,327. About 11.5% of families and 13.8% of the population were below the poverty line, including 22.0% of those under age 18 and 8.9% of those age 65 or over.
