= Rexis, Pennsylvania =

Unincorporated community in Pennsylvania, US

- Unincorporated community
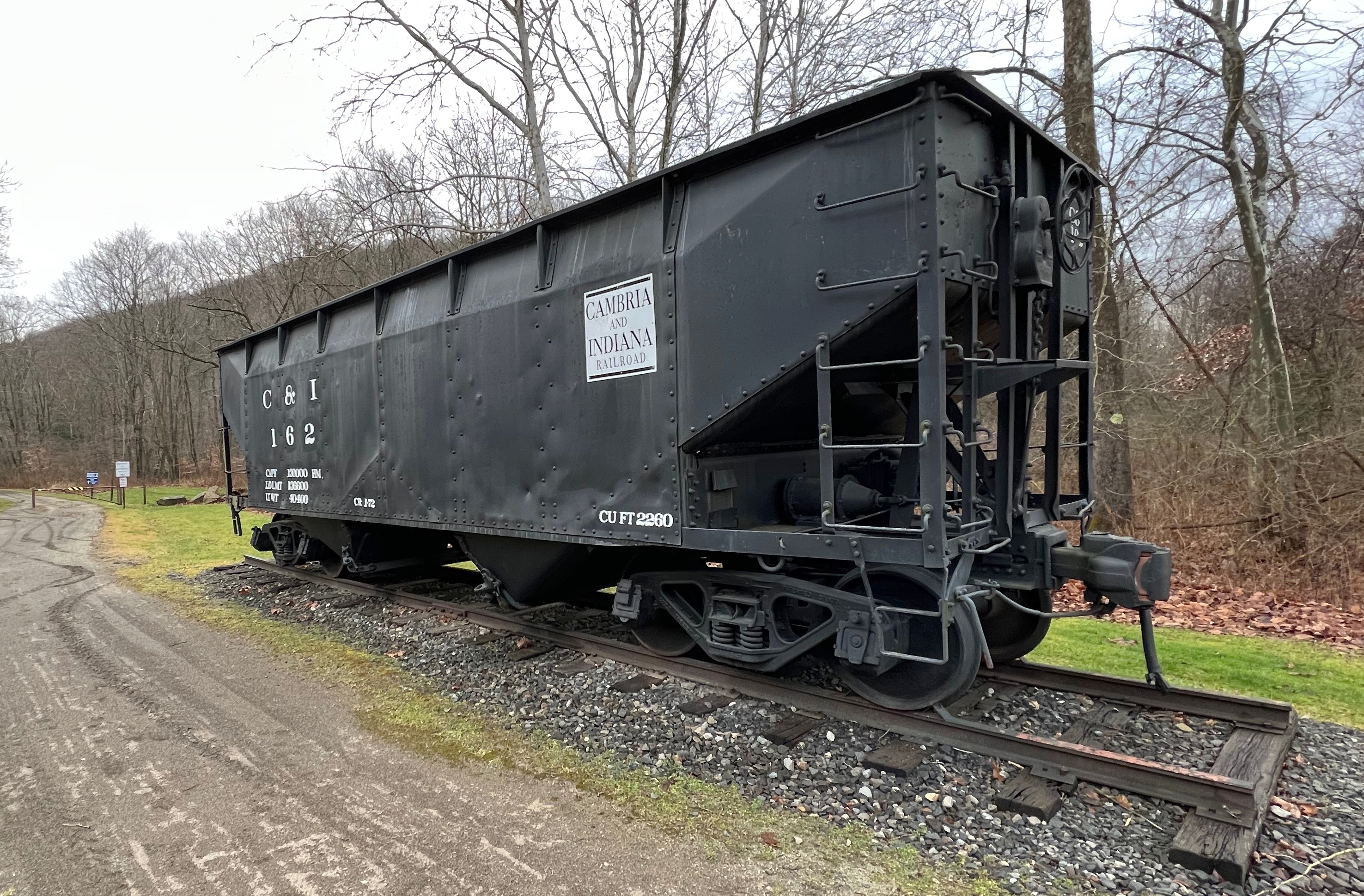
- Preserved Cambria and Indiana Railroad coal hopper in Rexis

- Location within Pennsylvania Location within the United States
- Coordinates: 40°29′11″N 78°55′20″W
- Country: United States
- State: Pennsylvania
- County: Indiana
- Township: Buffington
- Elevation: 1,394 ft (425 m)
- Time zone: UTC-5 (Eastern (EST))
  - Summer (DST): UTC-4 (EDT)
- Area code: 814
- GNIS feature ID: 1184961

Rexis is an unincorporated community in Indiana County, Pennsylvania, United States. The community is located at the Cambria County line across from Vintondale, near the confluence of the two branches of Blacklick Creek.
