= 1903 Latrobe Athletic Association season =

Professional football team season

1903 Latrobe Athletic Association football
- League: Independent
- Record: 9–0
- Manager: John Brallier
- Head coach: John Brallier
- Captain: Harry Ryan
- Home field: Latrobe Steel Athletic Grounds

The 1903 Latrobe Athletic Association season was their eighth season in existence. It was a low profile season for Latrobe. The team finished 9–0. Latrobe laid claim to the western Pennsylvania championship after the undefeated season. However, the Franklin Athletic Club was generally considered the 1903 U.S. Pro Football Champions, even though they had refused to play Latrobe.

== Schedule ==
Game	Date	Opponent	Result
1	September 26	Jeannette Hose Co. 4	W 28–0
2	October 3	Johnstown Capital Club	W 46–0
3	October 10	East End Athletic Club	W 6–5
4	October 24	Irwin, Pennsylvania	W 39–0
5	October 28	Indiana Normal School	W 54–0
6	November 7	Pittsburgh Lyceum	W 34–0
7	November 14	Bradenton St. Clair Athletic Club	W 36–0
8	November 21	Ellwood City, Pennsylvania	W 35–0
9	November 26	Pennsylvania Railroad YMCA of Philadelphia	W 6–0
