= Brush Valley, Pennsylvania =

Unincorporated community in Pennsylvania, US

- Unincorporated community
- Location within Pennsylvania Location within the United States
- Coordinates: 40°32′10″N 79°03′59″W
- Country: United States
- State: Pennsylvania
- County: Indiana
- Township: Brush Valley
- Elevation: 1,437 ft (438 m)
- Time zone: UTC-5 (Eastern (EST))
  - Summer (DST): UTC-4 (EDT)
- ZIP code: 15720
- Area code: 724
- GNIS feature ID: 1170464

Brush Valley is an unincorporated community in Indiana County, Pennsylvania, United States. The community is located at the intersection of Pennsylvania Route 56 and Pennsylvania Route 259, 7.4 miles (11.9 km) southeast of Indiana. Brush Valley was founded by John Cresswell in 1803. The town was originally named Mechanicsburgh. It has its own ZIP code, 15720.
