= Wehrum, Pennsylvania =

Former mining town in Pennsylvania, US

Coordinates: 40°28′15″N 78°56′59″W

Little girl in yard of house on Broadway in Wehrum, c. 1924

View of Wehrum c. 1923. The perspective is to the north. Portions of First, Second, Third and Fourth Streets are shown.

Street map of Wehrum, dated September 30, 1922.

Wehrum Cemetery, now hidden in the forest.

Wehrum is an abandoned coal mining company town in Buffington Township, Indiana County, Pennsylvania, United States, that thrived for a time during the early 20th century. The mine upon which it was entirely dependent closed in 1929, and the last known inhabitants left in 1934. Essentially all that remains of Wehrum today are shadowy remnants of some of the streets and various building foundations hidden in the woods. Wehrum is now one of the ghost towns included in Pennsylvania's Ghost Town Trail.

== History ==
Wehrum was founded as a non-union company town in 1901 by Judge A. V. Barker and Warren Delano, maternal uncle of Franklin Roosevelt. It was named after Henry Wehrum, general manager of the Lackawanna Iron and Steel Company. The town was operated by a subsidiary, the Lackawanna Coal & Coke Company. The town plan had six north–south streets, all 60 feet (18 m) wide, along with five cross streets and several alleys, and the town consisted of 250 houses, a bank, jail, hotel, company store, post office, school and two churches.

In what was perhaps a playful reference to New York City, several of the small town's street names were evocative of lower Manhattan (e.g., "Broadway" and "The Bowery"). In addition to the town site, the company purchased a large amount of coal land from the Blacklick Land and Improvement Company.

The Lackawanna No. 4 mine was opened in 1902 at the site, and Lackawanna No. 3 was opened a short distance away at a small settlement known only as Lackawanna No. 3. In 1903, the Pennsylvania Railroad extended passenger service on its Ebensburg & Blacklick Branch from Vintondale past Wehrum. In February of that year, all African Americans were expelled from the town.

The company invested over $1 million in Wehrum and the town quickly developed. Coal from the Wehrum mines was shipped to Buffalo, Rochester, and Pittsburgh.

Operations in Wehrum experienced several accidents. In 1904, a gas explosion killed four miners. The coal washer burnt in 1906, leading to decreased activity until the washer was replaced the next year. In 1909, an explosion killed twenty-one miners. The mines were eventually sold to the Bethlehem Mines Corporation in 1922, which unexpectedly closed the mines in 1929. Many of the houses were stripped for lumber, and the mine buildings were sold for scrap. By 1934 only one house, the school, and the jail remained.

One of the few remnants of Wehrum is the Sts. Peter and Paul Russian Orthodox Church cemetery, built between 1902 and 1904 on land purchased by Saint Tikhon of Moscow. The church acquired more property in Vintondale, where a new building was constructed in 1907. Records indicate that many of the residents were from Máramaros in the Kingdom of Hungary. The last burials were in 1927.

== Dam ==
The Wehrum Dam is another remnant of the old mining town. Its remains can still be found deep in the woods leading up the mountain from where the Allegheny Trail passes through the area. The Wehrum Dam had originally been used by the Bethlehem Mines Corporation. This dam was one of six that broke during two rainy days, July 19–20, 1977, contributing to the Johnstown Flood of that year. It is listed as "Unnamed Dam" in some places, but most who live in the area continue to refer to it as the Wehrum Dam, even to this day. The sides of the walls of the old dam still rest among the cliffs of the area, the basin of the former dam now a tangled and overgrown meadow.

== Namesake ==
The town of Wehrum is named after Henry Wehrum, General Manager of Lackawanna Iron and Steel, Scranton, Pennsylvania. Born in France in 1843, Wehrum migrated to the US after the French defeat in the Franco-Prussian War in 1871. He was instrumental in moving the Lackawanna works to Buffalo, New York in 1901. He also encouraged the purchase of coal lands in Cambria and Indiana Counties. He died in 1906 at his home in Elmhurst, near Scranton.

== See also ==
- List of ghost towns in Pennsylvania
