= Robinson, Indiana County, Pennsylvania =

Unincorporated community in Pennsylvania, US

Robinson, Pennsylvania
- Census-designated place
- Location within Pennsylvania Location within the United States
- Coordinates: 40°24′18″N 79°08′18″W
- Country: United States
- State: Pennsylvania
- County: Indiana
- Township: West Wheatfield

Area
  - Total: 0.81 sq mi (2.10 km^{2})
  - Land: 0.77 sq mi (2.00 km^{2})
  - Water: 0.039 sq mi (0.10 km^{2})
- Elevation: 1,119 ft (341 m)

Population (2020)
  - Total: 583
  - Density: 753.6/sq mi (290.98/km^{2})
- Time zone: UTC-5 (Eastern (EST))
  - Summer (DST): UTC-4 (EDT)
- ZIP code: 15949
- FIPS code: 42-65360
- GNIS feature ID: 2630035

Robinson is a census-designated place located in West Wheatfield Township, Indiana County in the state of Pennsylvania, United States. The community is located near the Westmoreland County line and the borough of Bolivar, along Pennsylvania Route 259. As of the 2010 census, the population was 614 residents.

== History ==
Founded in 1880, Robinson was originally named Garfield after the recently elected president. It has its origins as a brickyard town, with the Garfield Fire Clay Company operating refractories there and in neighboring Bolivar from 1887 until 1979.

== Demographics ==
Historical population
Census	Pop.	Note	%±
2020	583		—
U.S. Decennial Census
