= 1904 Latrobe Athletic Association season =

American football team season

1904 Latrobe Athletic Association football
- Record: 9–0
- Manager: John Brallier
- Head coach: John Brallier
- Captain: Harry Ryan
- Home field: Latrobe Steel Athletic Grounds

The 1904 Latrobe Athletic Association season was their tenth season in existence. The team finished 9-0 and were unscored upon. Latrobe laid claim to Pennsylvania's pro football title at the season's end.

== Schedule ==
Game	Date	Opponent	Result
1	October 1	Bolivar	W 46–0
2	October 8	Pitcairn Quakers	W 46–0
3	October 22	Homestead Steel Works	W 41–0
4	October 29	Dravosburg	W 47–0
5	November 5	Edgar Thompson Works	W 37–0
6	November 8	Kittanning	W 24–0
7	November 12	Steelton YMCA	W 5–0
8	November 19	East End Lyceum	W 24–0
9	November 24	Kittanning	W 53–0
