= Bridge in West Wheatfield Township =

- U.S. National Register of Historic Places
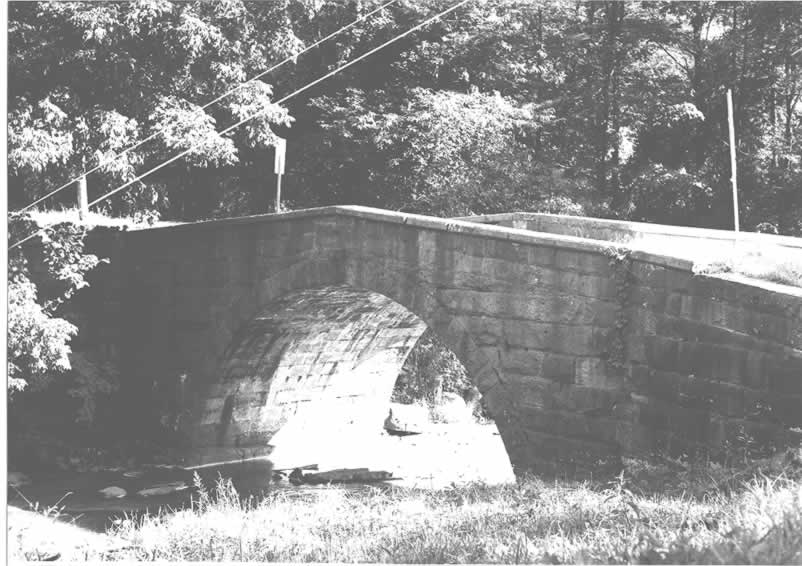
- Bridge in West Wheatfield Township, 1982

- Location within Pennsylvania Location within the United States
- Nearest city: Legislative Route 32008 over Richards Run, northeast of Robinson, West Wheatfield Township, Pennsylvania
- Coordinates: 40°24′11″N 79°7′45″W
- Area: less than one acre
- Built: 1911
- Architectural style: Single span camelback arch
- MPS: Highway Bridges Owned by the Commonwealth of Pennsylvania, Department of Transportation TR
- NRHP reference No.: 88000774
- Added to NRHP: June 22, 1988

Bridge in West Wheatfield Township is a historic stone arch bridge located at West Wheatfield Township in Indiana County, Pennsylvania. It was built in 1911, and is a 75-foot-long (23 m) bridge, with a semi-circular arch spanning 30-foot-long (9.1 m). It is built of rough, rock faced ashlar with a concrete parapet. It crosses Richard's Run.

It was listed on the National Register of Historic Places in 1988.
