= Yellow Creek (Two Lick Creek tributary) =

Coordinates: 40.57491°N 79.03337°W

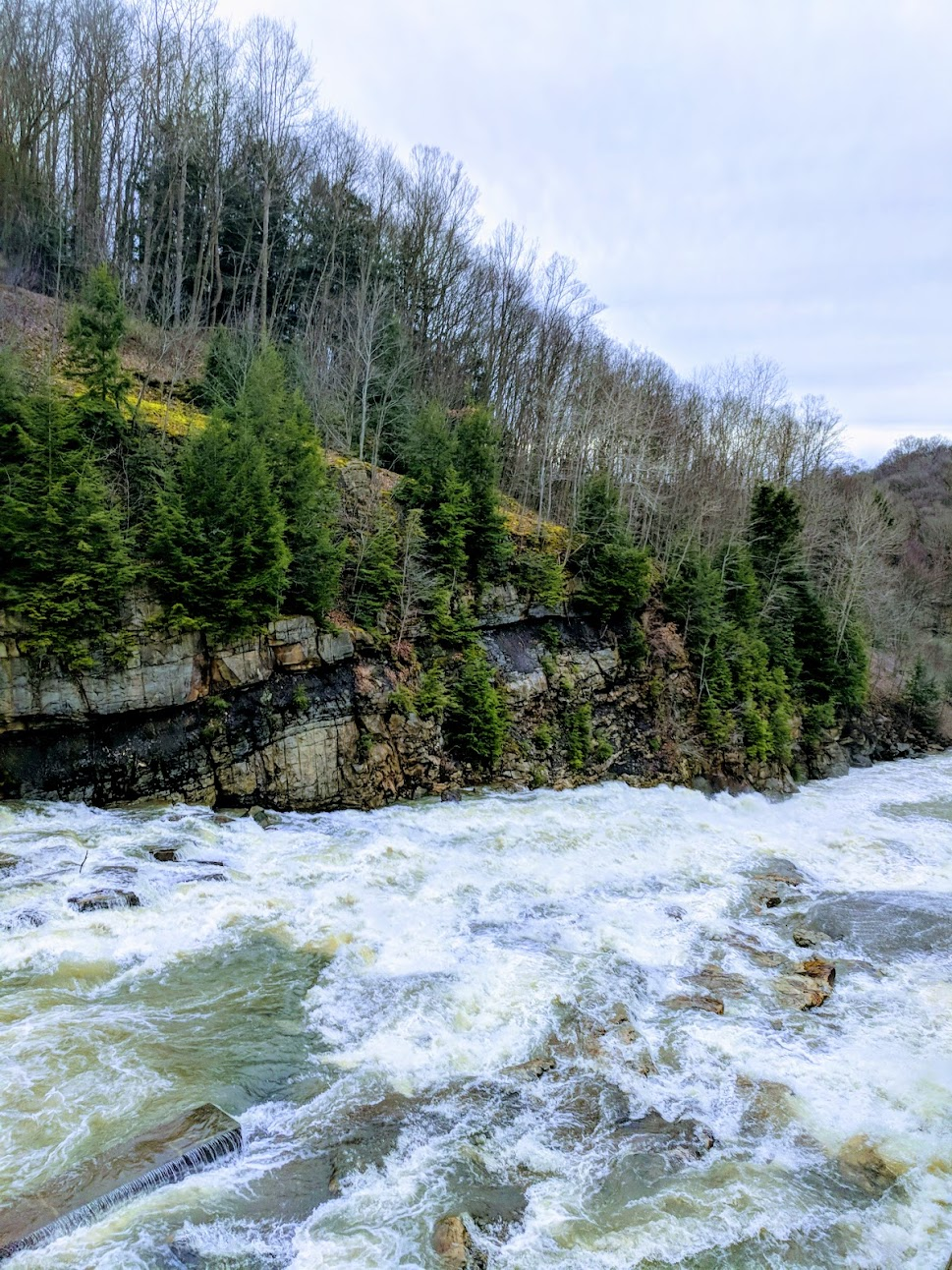
View of Yellow Creek Spillway, with lake waters flowing into Yellow Creek.

Yellow Creek is a tributary of Two Lick Creek in Indiana County, Pennsylvania in the United States.

Yellow Creek flows through Yellow Creek State Park before joining Two Lick Creek at Homer City.

== See also ==
- List of rivers of Pennsylvania
