= 1902 Latrobe Athletic Association season =

American football team season

1902 Latrobe Athletic Association football
- Record: 3–0–2
- Head coach: John Brallier

The 1902 Latrobe Athletic Association season was their eighth season in existence. It was a low profile season for Latrobe. In five known documented games, the team had a record of 3–0–2. John Brallier rejoined the team as player-coach.

== Schedule ==
Game	Date	Opponent	Result	Source
1	September 27	Indiana Normal School	T 0–0	
2	October 4	Primrose Athletic Club	T 0–0	
3	October 25	Wilkinsburg Sterling Athletic Club	W 23–0	
4	November 1	Indiana (PA) Fifth Regiment	W 22–2	
5	November 8	Latrobe Steel Works	W 17–0	

A schedule listed by football historian Robert Van Atta omits the Primrose game and gives a different result against the Sterling Athletic Club (an undated scoreless tie, instead of an October 25 victory).
