= 1905 Latrobe Athletic Association season =

American football team season

1905 Latrobe Athletic Association football
- Record: 8–0
- Manager: John Brallier
- Head coach: John Brallier
- Captain: Harry Ryan
- Home field: Latrobe Steel Athletic Grounds

The 1905 Latrobe Athletic Association season was their tenth season in existence. Led by head coach and manager John Brallier and captain Harry Ryan, the team finished 8–0 and were unscored upon. As a result, Latrobe claimed the Pennsylvania professional football title.

== Schedule ==
Game	Date	Opponent	Result	Source
1	October 7	Iron City	W 30–0	
2	October 14	Pitcairn Quakers	W 53–0	
3	October 21	Pennsylvania Railroad YMCA of Philadelphia	W 10–0	
4	October 28	South Fork	W 33–0	
5	November 4	at Steelton YMCA	W 23–0	
6	November 18	Canton Athletic Club (Note: Team would become the Canton Bulldogs of the National Football League in 1920.)	W 6–0	
7	November 25	Steelton YMCA	W 4–0	
8	November 30 (Note: Thanksgiving Day game)	Sewickley	W 28–0	

A season-ending game against the Massillon Tigers was proposed but never occurred.
