= Burrell Township, Indiana County, Pennsylvania =

Township in Pennsylvania, US

Coordinates: 40°27′00″N 79°12′00″W

- Township
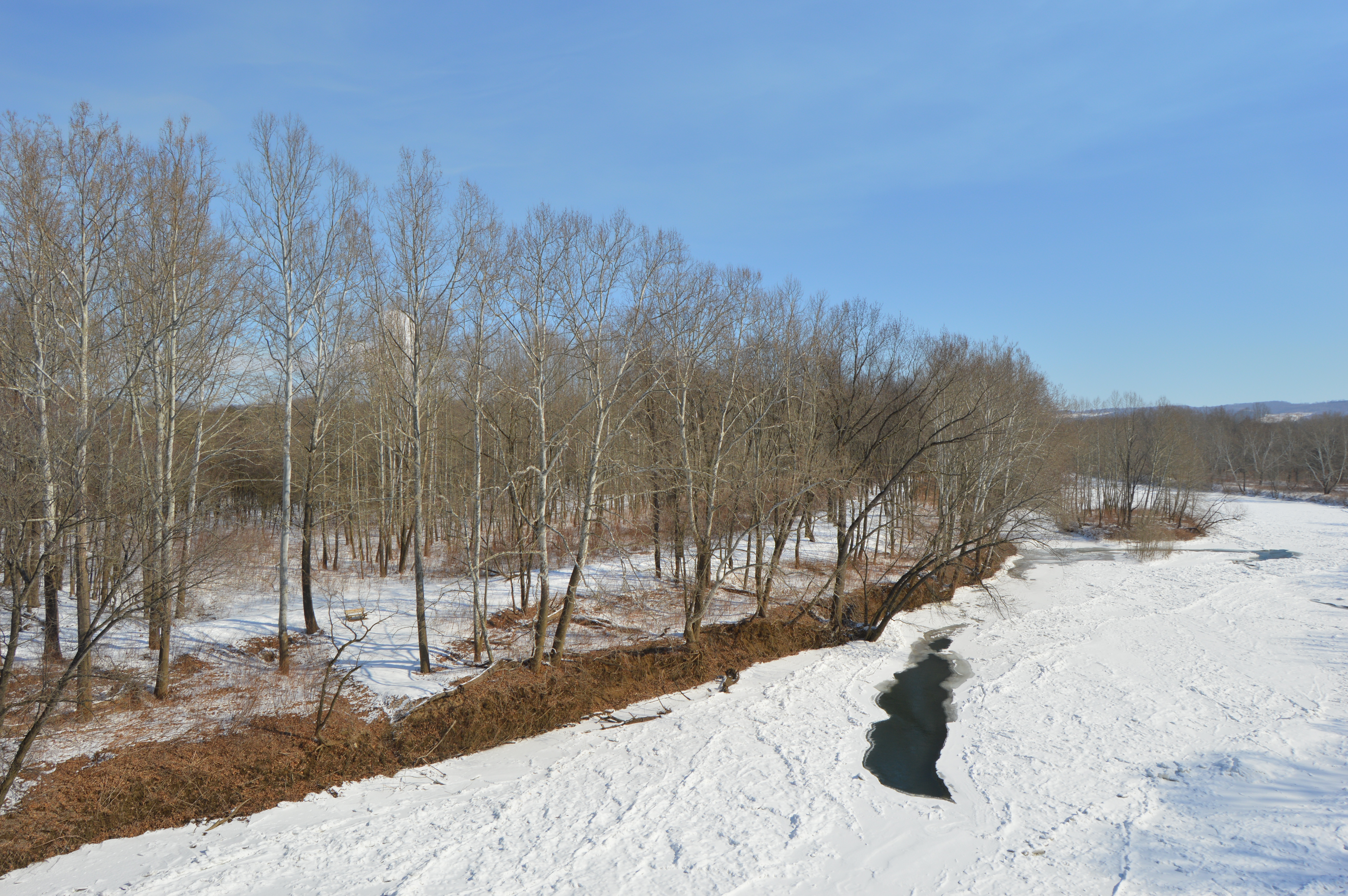
- Along the Conemaugh River south of Blairsville

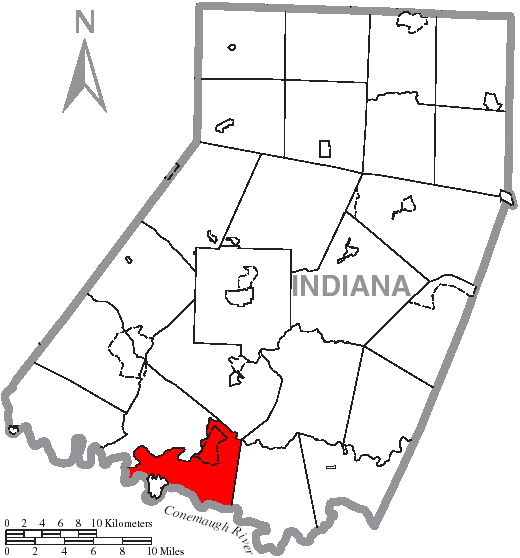
- Map of Indiana County, Pennsylvania Highlighting Burrell Township

- Map of Pennsylvania highlighting Indiana County
- Country: United States
- State: Pennsylvania
- County: Indiana

Area
  - Total: 24.39 sq mi (63.18 km^{2})
  - Land: 23.88 sq mi (61.84 km^{2})
  - Water: 0.52 sq mi (1.34 km^{2})

Population (2020)
  - Total: 3,525 ▼
  - Estimate (2021): 3,511
  - Density: 175.3/sq mi (67.69/km^{2})
- Time zone: UTC-5 (Eastern (EST))
  - Summer (DST): UTC-4 (EDT)
- FIPS code: 42-063-10352

Burrell Township is a township in Indiana County, Pennsylvania, United States. Burrell Township was formed from Black Lick Township in 1853, named after Judge Burrell. The population was 3,525 at the 2020 census, a decline from the figure of 4,393 tabulated in 2010. The township includes the communities of Bell's Mills, Black Lick, Campbells Mill, Fairfield Heights, Josephine, Marshall Heights, Oake's Point, Palmertown, Smith, and Strangford.

== Geography ==
According to the United States Census Bureau, the township has a total area of 24.5 square miles (63 km^{2}), of which 23.7 square miles (61 km^{2}) is land and 0.8 square miles (2.1 km^{2}) (3.11%) is water.

== Demographics ==
Historical population
Census	Pop.	Note	%±
1860	1,251		—
1870	1,374		9.8%
1880	1,770		28.8%
1890	1,414		−20.1%
1900	1,435		1.5%
1910	3,109		116.7%
1920	4,308		38.6%
1930	3,291		−23.6%
1940	3,555		8.0%
1950	3,478		−2.2%
1960	3,476		−0.1%
1970	3,672		5.6%
1980	4,152		13.1%
1990	3,669		−11.6%
2000	3,746		2.1%
2010	4,393		17.3%
2020	3,525		−19.8%
2021 (est.)	3,511		−0.4%
U.S. Decennial Census

As of the census of 2000, there were 3,746 people, 1,495 households, and 1,079 families residing in the township. The population density was 157.9 inhabitants per square mile (61.0/km^{2}). There were 1,632 housing units at an average density of 68.8 per square mile (26.6/km^{2}). The racial makeup of the township was 97.84% White, 1.58% African American, 0.08% Native American, 0.03% Asian, 0.11% from other races, and 0.37% from two or more races. Hispanic or Latino of any race were 0.45% of the population.

There were 1,495 households, out of which 29.3% had children under the age of 18 living with them, 56.8% were married couples living together, 10.1% had a female householder with no husband present, and 27.8% were non-families. 24.7% of all households were made up of individuals, and 12.3% had someone living alone who was 65 years of age or older. The average household size was 2.45 and the average family size was 2.88.

In the township the population was spread out, with 21.5% under the age of 18, 7.0% from 18 to 24, 27.1% from 25 to 44, 25.6% from 45 to 64, and 18.8% who were 65 years of age or older. The median age was 41 years. For every 100 females there were 95.9 males. For every 100 females age 18 and over, there were 93.7 males.

The median income for a household in the township was $31,366, and the median income for a family was $37,377. Males had a median income of $30,451 versus $21,964 for females. The per capita income for the township was $15,645. About 10.9% of families and 13.7% of the population were below the poverty line, including 21.9% of those under age 18 and 9.2% of those age 65 or over.
