= Two Lick Creek =

Creek in Indiana County, Pennsylvania

Coordinates: 40.65454°N 79.00285°W

Two Lick Creek is a drainage basin measuring approximately 190 square miles (490 km^{2}), and is the largest tributary of Blacklick Creek, located in Indiana County, Pennsylvania in the United States.

== Tributaries ==
- Yellow Creek (Two Lick Creek)

== See also ==
- List of rivers of Pennsylvania
