= West Wheatfield Township, Pennsylvania =

Township in Pennsylvania, US

Coordinates: 40°27′00″N 79°08′00″W

- Township
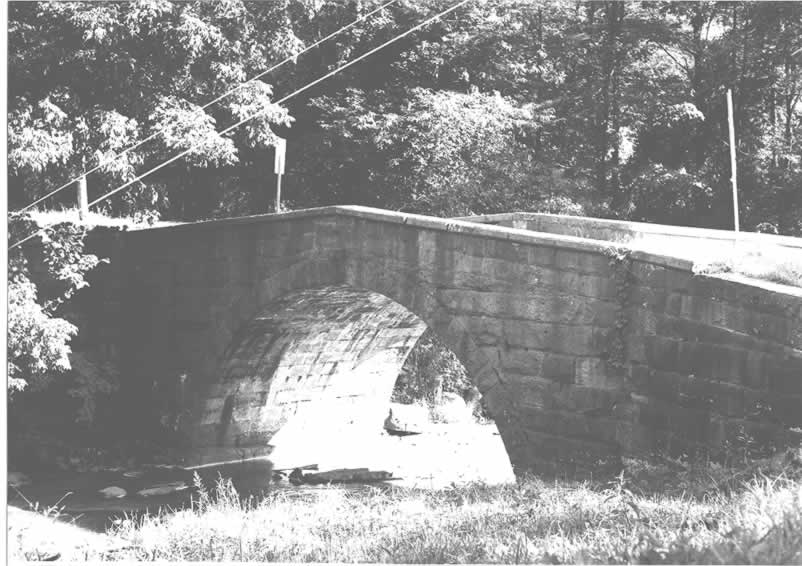
- The Bridge in West Wheatfield Township

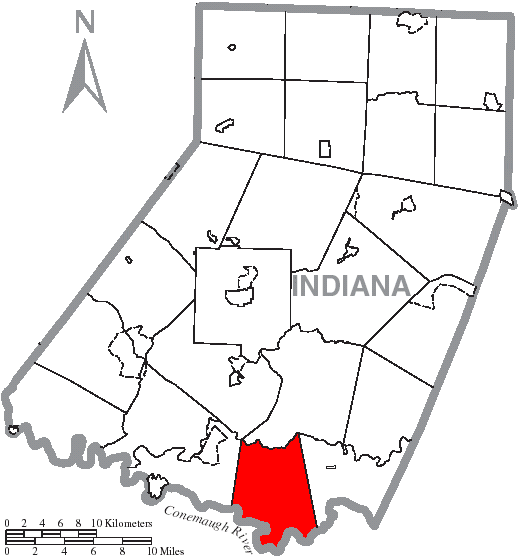
- Map of Indiana County, Pennsylvania Highlighting West Whitfield Township

- Map of Pennsylvania highlighting Indiana County
- Country: United States
- State: Pennsylvania
- County: Indiana

Area
  - Total: 31.89 sq mi (82.59 km^{2})
  - Land: 31.59 sq mi (81.82 km^{2})
  - Water: 0.30 sq mi (0.77 km^{2})

Population (2020)
  - Total: 2,164 ▼
  - Estimate (2016): 2,151
  - Density: 69.6/sq mi (26.88/km^{2})
- Time zone: UTC-5 (Eastern (EST))
  - Summer (DST): UTC-4 (EDT)
- FIPS code: 42-063-84184

West Wheatfield Township is a township in Indiana County, Pennsylvania, United States. The population was 2,164 at the time of the 2020 census.

This township includes the communities of Centerville, Climax, Clyde, Conpitt Junction, Germany, Heshbon, India, and Robinson.

== History ==
The Bridge in West Wheatfield Township was listed on the National Register of Historic Places in 1988.

== Geography ==
According to the United States Census Bureau, the township has a total area of 32.0 square miles (82.8 km^{2}), of which 31.6 square miles (81.9 km^{2}) is land and 0.3 square mile (0.9 km^{2}) (1.10%) is water.

== Demographics ==
Historical population
Census	Pop.	Note	%±
1860	1,408		—
1870	1,318		−6.4%
1880	1,359		3.1%
1890	1,771		30.3%
1900	1,873		5.8%
1910	1,589		−15.2%
1920	2,112		32.9%
1930	1,775		−16.0%
1940	2,257		27.2%
1950	1,818		−19.5%
1960	2,275		25.1%
1970	2,165		−4.8%
1980	2,699		24.7%
1990	2,370		−12.2%
2000	2,375		0.2%
2010	2,314		−2.6%
2020	2,164		−6.5%
2021 (est.)	2,151		−0.6%
U.S. Decennial Census

As of the census of 2000, there were 2,375 people, 903 households, and 704 families residing in the township.

The population density was 75.1 inhabitants per square mile (29.0/km^{2}). There were 967 housing units at an average density of 30.6 per square mile (11.8/km^{2}).

The racial makeup of the township was 99.37% White, 0.08% African American, 0.08% Native American, 0.17% Asian, 0.08% from other races, and 0.21% from two or more races. Hispanic or Latino of any race were 0.42% of the population.

There were 903 households, out of which 30.7% had children who were under the age of eighteen living with them, 65.3% were married couples living together, 8.7% had a female householder with no husband present, and 22.0% were non-families. Out of all of the households that were documented, 19.8% were made up of individuals, and 9.0% had someone living alone who was sixty-five years of age or older.

The average household size was 2.63 and the average family size was 2.99.

Within the township, the population was spread out, with 23.5% of residents who were under the age of 18, 8.7% from 18 to 24, 27.5% from 25 to 44, 26.2% from 45 to 64, and 14.1% who were 65 years of age or older. The median age was 39 years.

For every one hundred females, there were 105.8 males. For every one hundred females who were aged eighteen or older, there were 100.0 males.

The median income for a household in the township was $31,224, and the median income for a family was $34,355. Males had a median income of $29,087 compared with that of $21,023 for females.

The per capita income for the township was $14,228.

Approximately 8.6% of families and 11.4% of the population were living below the poverty line, including 14.8% of those who were under the age of eighteen and 7.9% of those who were aged sixty-five or older.
