= Yellow Creek State Park =

State park in Indiana County, Pennsylvania

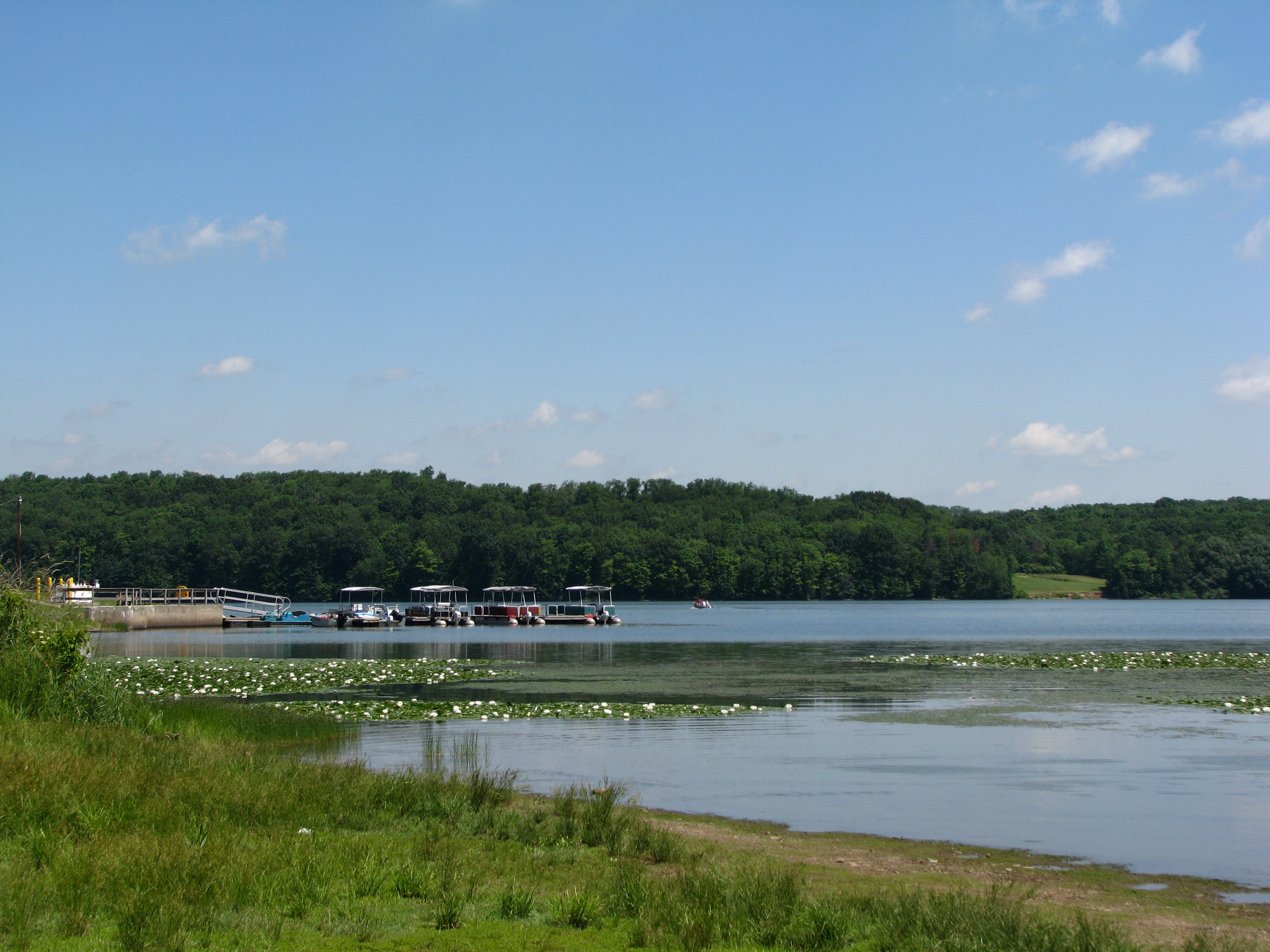
- Yellow Creek Lake

- Location within Pennsylvania Location within the United States
- Interactive map of Yellow Creek State Park
- Location: Indiana County, Pennsylvania, United States
- Coordinates: 40°34′41″N 79°00′03″W
- Area: 2,981 acres (1,206 ha)
- Elevation: 1,283 ft (391 m)
- Established: 1963; 63 years ago
- Administrator: Pennsylvania Department of Conservation and Natural Resources
- Website: Official website
- Pennsylvania State Parks

Yellow Creek State Park is a Pennsylvania state park on 2,981 acres (1,206 ha) in Brush Valley and Cherryhill Townships, Indiana County, Pennsylvania in the United States. The park encompasses parts of Yellow Creek and Little Yellow Creek. The old Kittanning Path goes through the parkland. The park was established in 1963. An additional 159 acres (64 ha) of developed land were purchased in 1982. Yellow Creek Lake, a 720-acre (290 ha) man-made lake, was built in 1969 by an earth and rock dam on Yellow Creek. Yellow Creek State Park is between the boroughs of Ebensburg and Indiana on U.S. Route 422.

== Hiking ==
There are 5 miles (8.0 km) of trails open to hiking at Yellow Creek State Park. Ridgetop Trail is the most challenging of the trails. It is 2 miles (3.2 km) and passes through a variety of habitats. Laurel Run Trail is a 0.5-mile (0.80 km) loop trail in the vicinity of the park office. Damsite Trail, the longest trail in the park at 2.5 miles (4.0 km), is a remnant of the roads used to build Yellow Creek Lake in 1969.

== Picnicking ==
Yellow Creek State Park is a popular destination for groups and families for picnicking. The main picnic area is near the beach with parking for over 4,000 people and a large number of picnic tables. There are three pavilions in the main picnic area. The pavilions may be reserved up to 11 months in advance. Unreserved picnic tables are available on a first come first served basis.

== Camping ==
Six cottages and 4 yurts are available to rent at Yellow Creek State Park. The cottages are on the lakeshore near McFeather's Cove. They sleep up to five in single or double bunks. They have wooden floors, glass windows, a porch, and electric lights. The yard area of the cottages have picnic tables and fire rings. The yurts also sleep up to five in single or double bunks. They are a bit more modern than the cottages. Each yurt has a refrigerator and stove as well as tables, chairs and electric lights and heat.

== Yellow Creek Lake ==
Boats up to 20 horsepower are permitted on the waters of Yellow Creek Lake. There are three launch areas on the lake. All boats must display a current registration from any state or a launch permit from the Pennsylvania Fish and Boat Commission. Boats are available to rent near the beach area, including canoes, kayaks, sailboats, paddleboats, and motorized pontoon boats.

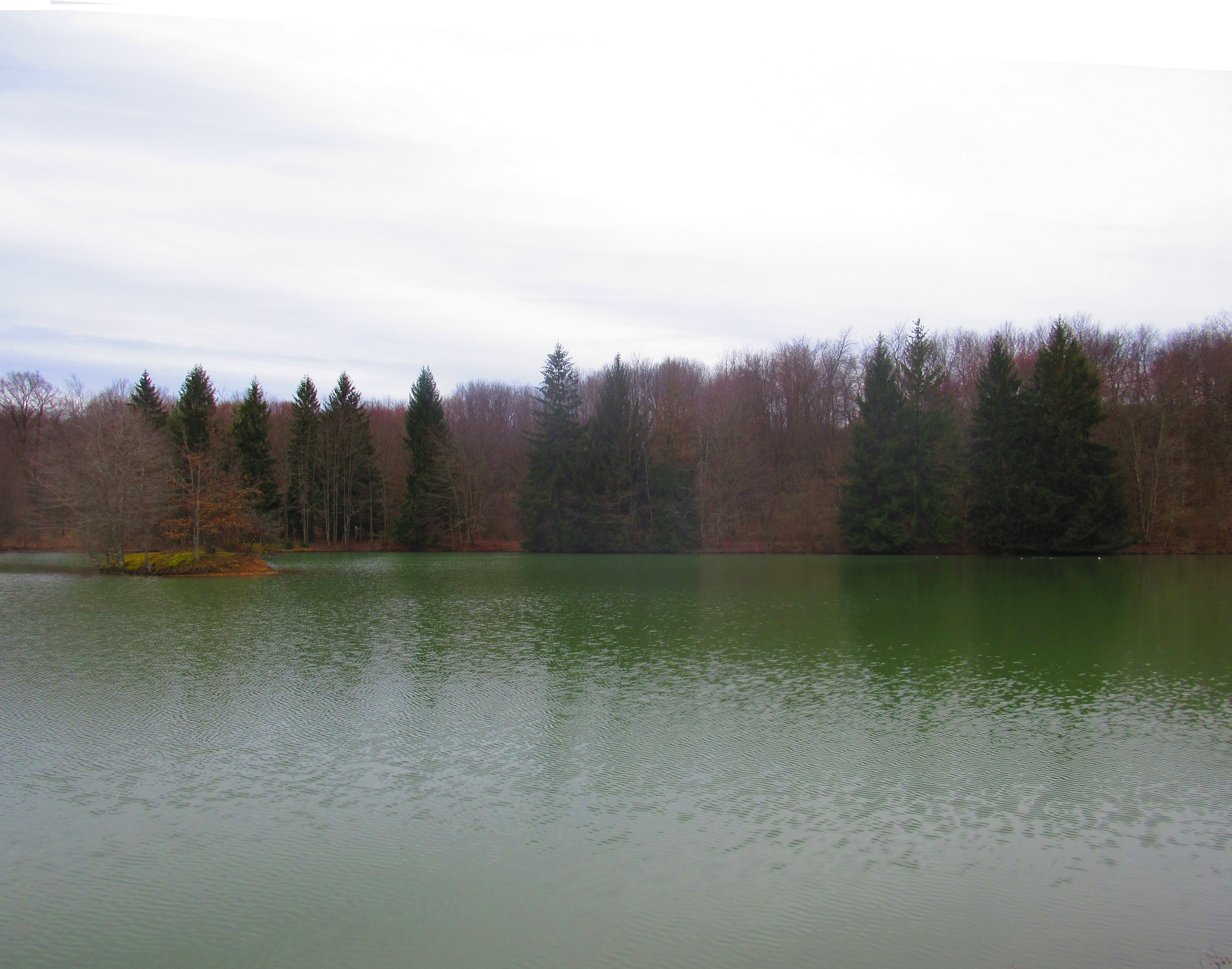
Shoreline during a late winter day.

An 800-foot (240 m) beach is open from Memorial Day weekend through Labor Day weekend. Beginning in 2008 lifeguards will not be posted at the beach. There is a large bathhouse at the beach that also serves as the first-aid station and snack bar.

== Hunting and fishing ==
Hunting is permitted at Yellow Creek State Park. Hunters are expected to follow the rules and regulations of the Pennsylvania Game Commission. The common game species are eastern gray squirrels, wild turkey, white-tailed deer, ruffed grouse, common pheasant, American black bear, waterfowl, and eastern cottontail rabbits. The hunting of groundhogs is prohibited.

Yellow Creek Lake is a warm water fishery. The common game fish are pike, muskellunge, bass, perch, crappie and bluegill. Laurel Run, Little Yellow Creek and Yellow Creek are cold water fisheries. These streams are stocked with trout by the Pennsylvania Fish and Boat Commission. All fishers are expected to follow the rules and regulations of the fish commission at all times.

== Photo Gallery ==
Yellow Creek Lake
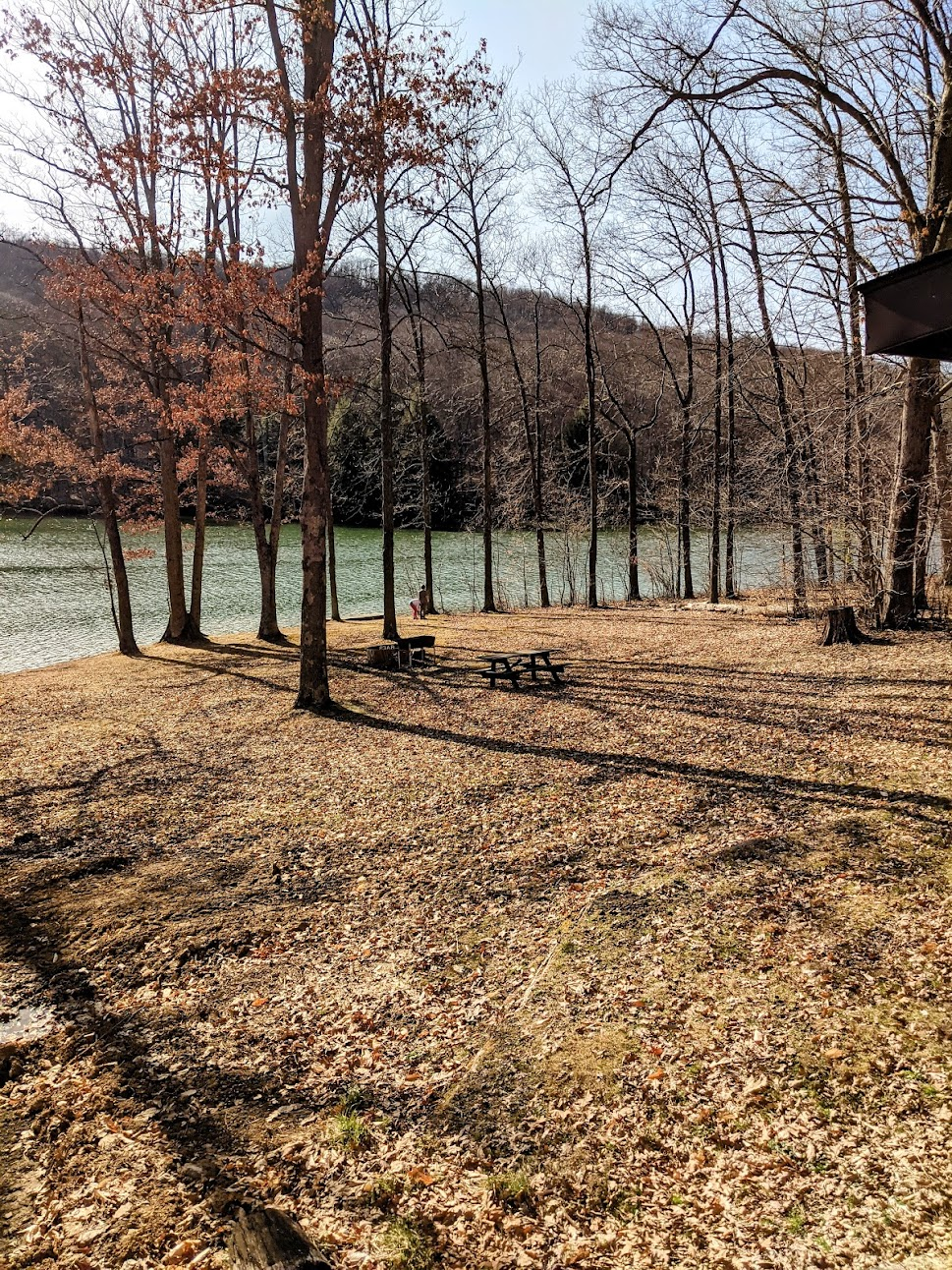
Eastern Shore of Yellow Creek Lake, near Camp Seph Mack (BSA)

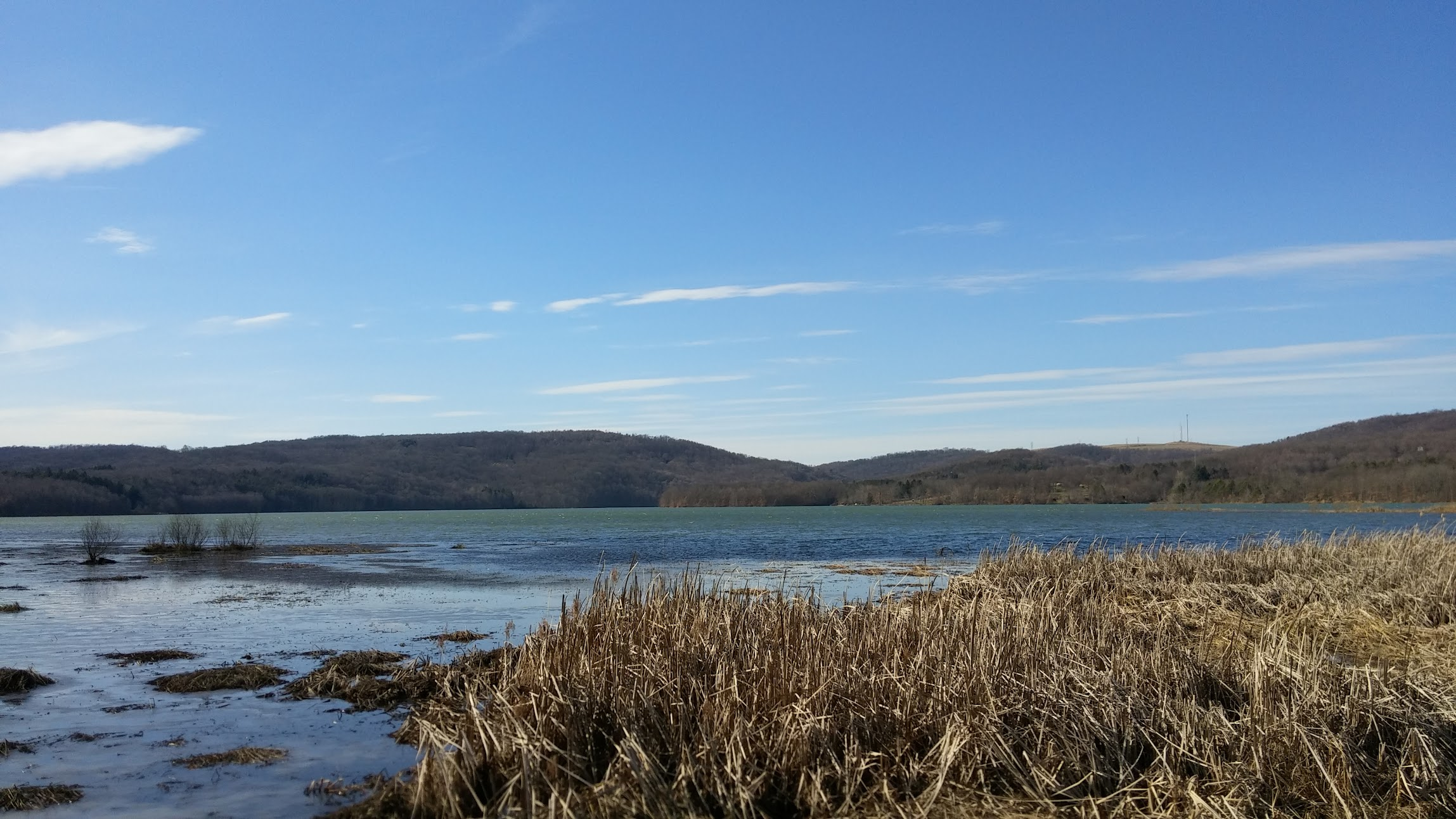
View of Yellow Creek Lake showing southern marsh area

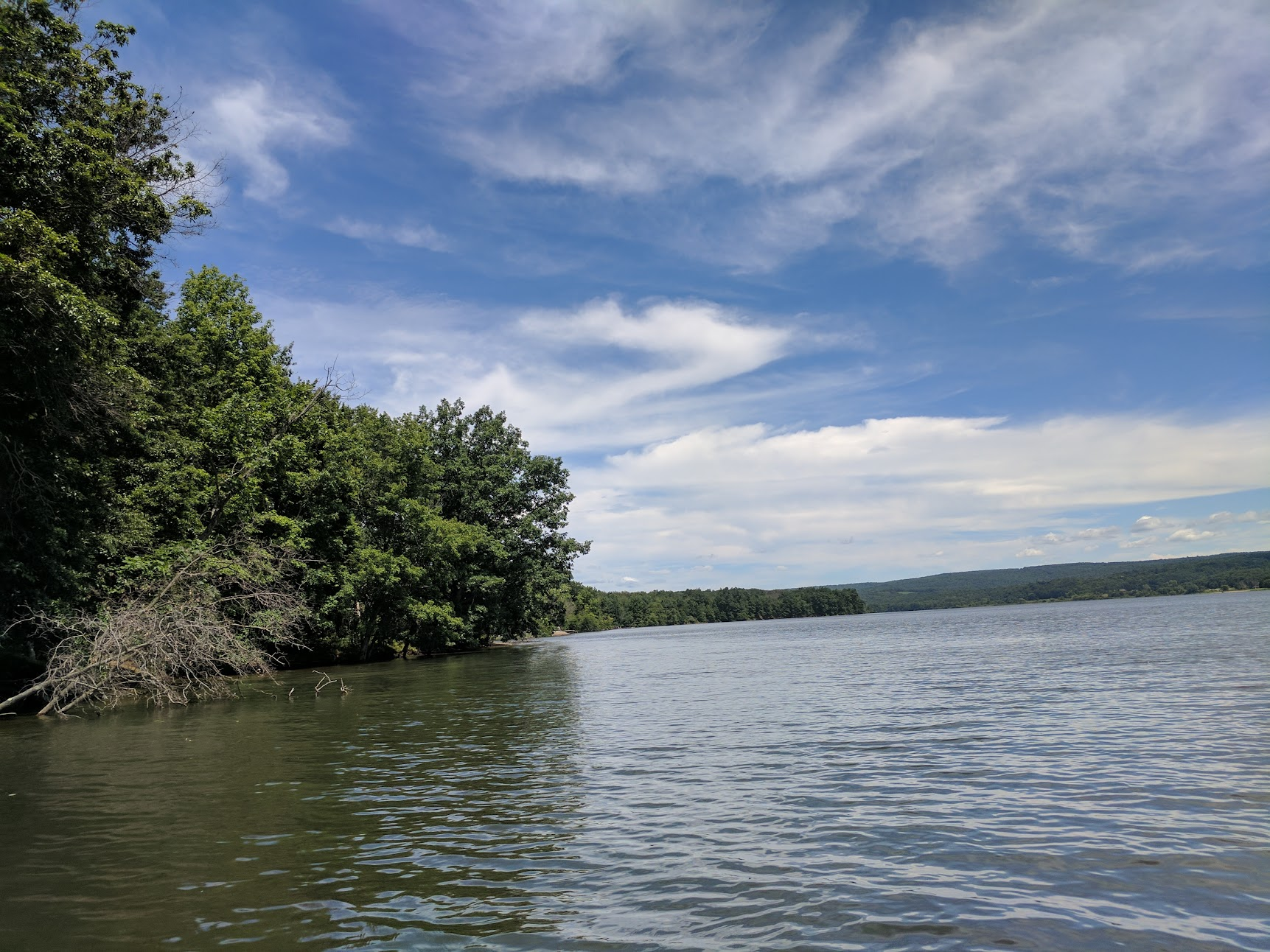
Northern view of Yellow Creek Lake from the water, near McFeaters Cover Boat Launch

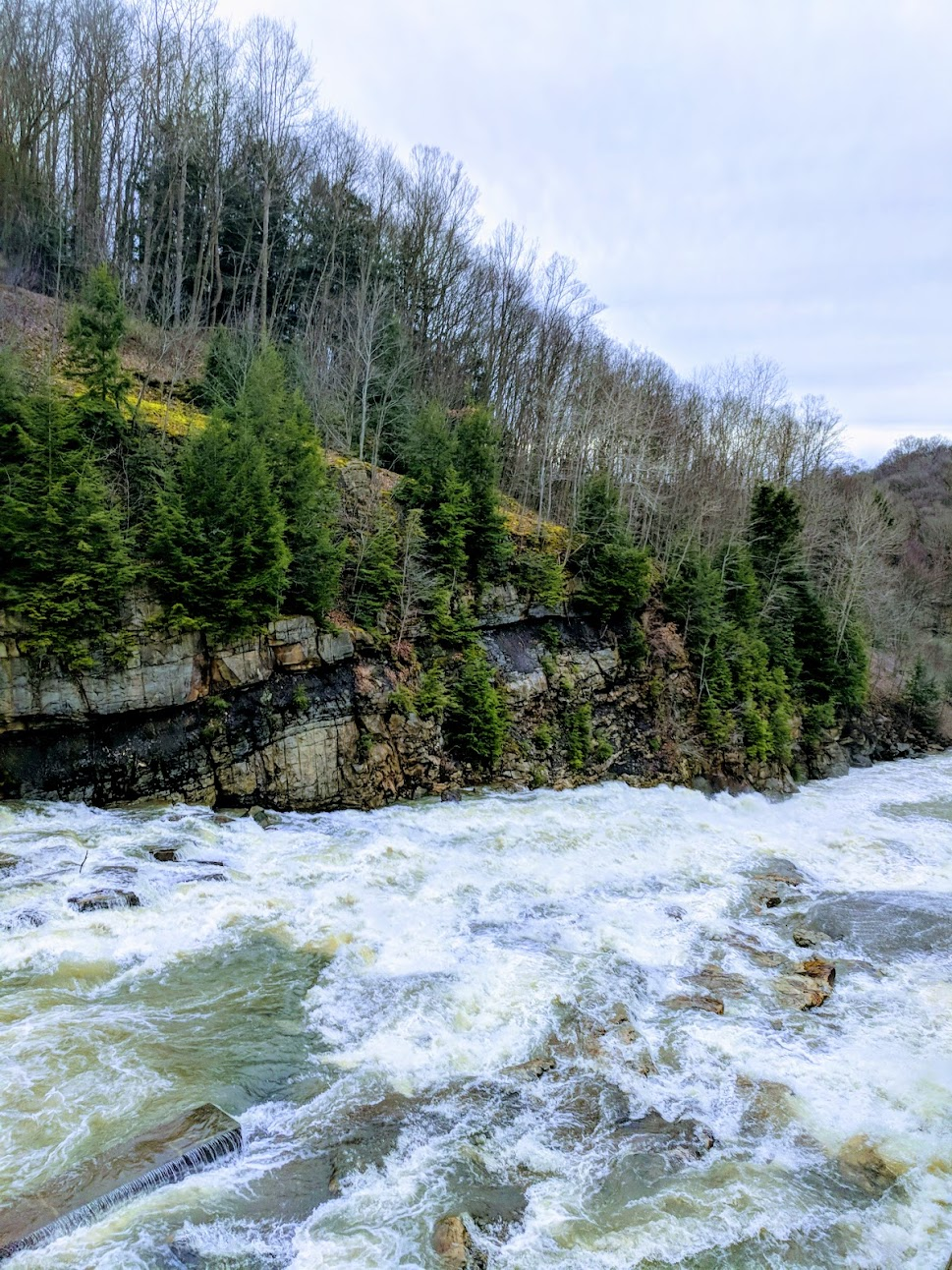
View of Yellow Creek Spillway, with lake waters flowing into Yellow Creek

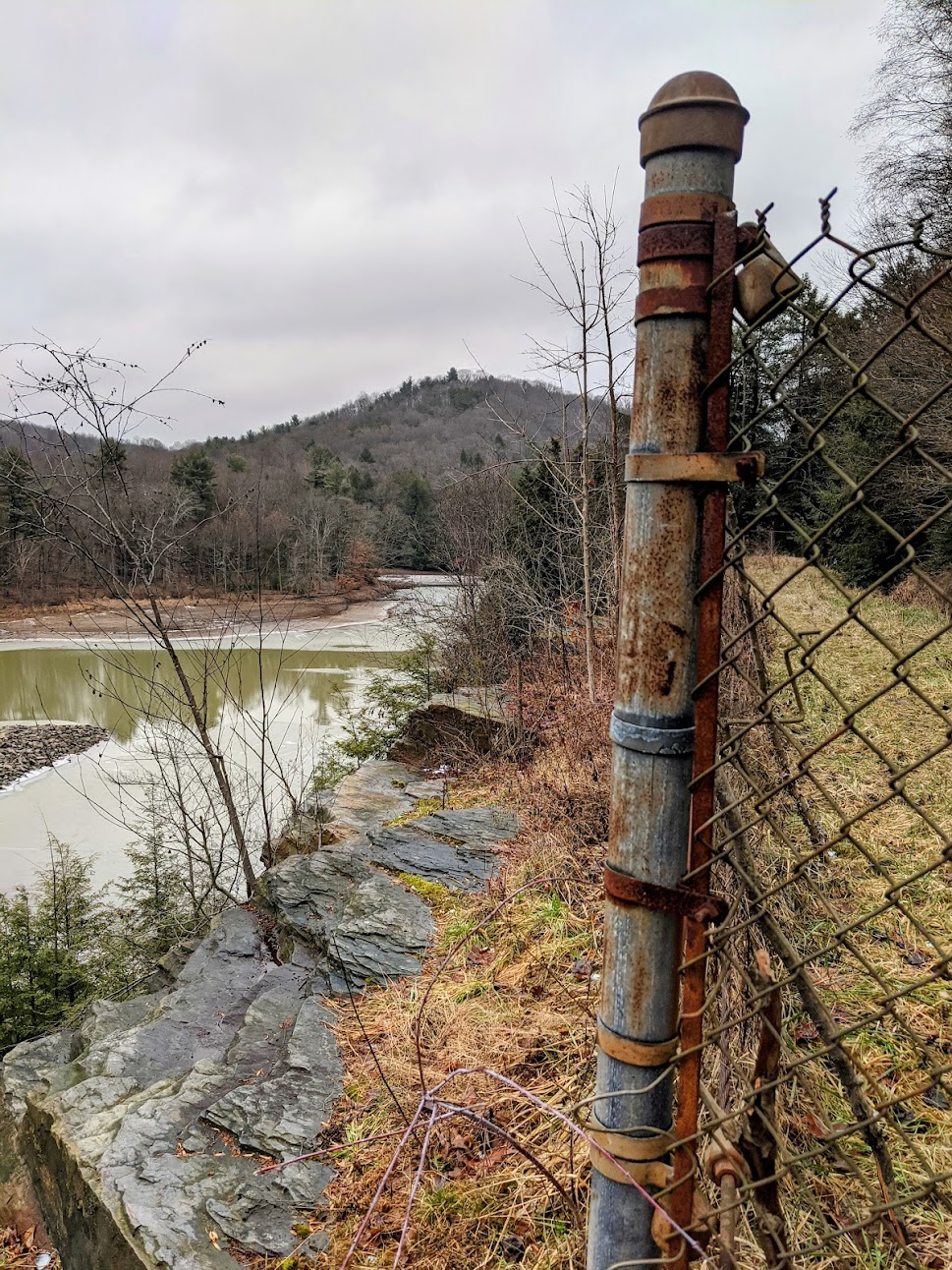
Yellow Creek Lake alongside dam and Spillway into Yellow Creek

== In the news ==
Yellow Creek State Park became the first Pennsylvania state park to switch from gasoline-powered lawn mowers to propane powered lawn mowers in 2008. This is part of a statewide effort to make the state parks more environmentally friendly. The propane mower reduces emissions by 90% and boosts fuel efficiency by 10%. Yellow Creek state park has taken other steps to reduce man's impact on the environment. These include installing wind turbines to provide electric power to the environmental education building. The buildings have been remodeled with better window placement in order to take advantage of the sun's rays. A new boat that uses less fuel has been purchased to patrol Yellow Creek Lake. Lastly, park rangers and educators are using bicycles instead of trucks whenever possible.
