= Black Lick, Pennsylvania =

Unincorporated community in Pennsylvania, US

- Census-designated place
- Location within Pennsylvania Location within the United States
- Coordinates: 40°28′21″N 79°11′34″W
- Country: United States
- State: Pennsylvania
- County: Indiana
- Township: Burrell

Area
  - Total: 2.54 sq mi (6.57 km^{2})
  - Land: 2.49 sq mi (6.46 km^{2})
  - Water: 0.042 sq mi (0.11 km^{2})

Population (2020)
  - Total: 1,268
  - Density: 508.3/sq mi (196.24/km^{2})
- Time zone: UTC-5 (Eastern (EST))
  - Summer (DST): UTC-4 (EDT)
- ZIP code: 15716
- FIPS code: 42-06744
- GNIS feature ID: 1169715

Black Lick is a census-designated place (CDP) in Burrell Township, Indiana County, Pennsylvania, United States. The population was 1,462 at the 2010 census.

A post office called Black Lick has been in operation since 1809. The community was named after Blacklick Creek.

== Geography ==
Black Lick is located at 40°28′21″N 79°11′34″W (40.472381, −79.192900).

According to the United States Census Bureau, the CDP has a total area of 2.6 square miles (6.7 km^{2}), of which 2.6 square miles (6.7 km^{2}) is land and 0.04 square miles (0.10 km^{2}) (0.78%) is water.

== Demographics ==
Historical population
Census	Pop.	Note	%±
2020	1,268		—
U.S. Decennial Census

As of the 2010 census, there were 1,462 people, 560 households, and 383 families residing in the CDP. The population density was 562.4 inhabitants per square mile (217.1/km^{2}). There were 597 housing units at an average density of 233.5 per square mile (90.2/km^{2}). The racial makeup of the CDP was 97.71% White, 1.81% African American, 0.14% Native American, 0.07% Asian, 0.07% from other races, and 0.21% from two or more races. Hispanic or Latino of any race were 0.76% of the population.

There were 560 households, out of which 32.9% had children under the age of 18 living with them, 50.2% were married couples living together, 12.1% had a female householder with no husband present, and 31.6% were non-families. 27.9% of all households were made up of individuals, and 13.8% had someone living alone who was 65 years of age or older. The average household size was 2.46 and the average family size was 2.97.

In the CDP, the population was spread out, with 22.9% under the age of 18, 8.4% from 18 to 24, 26.5% from 25 to 44, 23.1% from 45 to 64, and 19.1% who were 65 years of age or older. The median age was 40 years. For every 100 females, there were 92.5 males. For every 100 females age 18 and over, there were 87.2 males.

The median income for a household in the CDP was $24,459, and the median income for a family was $31,103. Males had a median income of $24,200 versus $20,909 for females. The per capita income for the CDP was $13,100. About 14.1% of families and 18.5% of the population were below the poverty line, including 31.7% of those under age 18 and 10.0% of those age 65 or over.
