= Josephine, Pennsylvania =

Unincorporated community in Pennsylvania, US

- Unincorporated community
- Location within Pennsylvania Location within the United States
- Coordinates: 40°28′38″N 79°10′53″W
- Country: United States
- State: Pennsylvania
- County: Indiana
- Township: Burrell
- Elevation: 1,033 ft (315 m)
- Time zone: UTC-5 (Eastern (EST))
  - Summer (DST): UTC-4 (EDT)
- ZIP code: 15750
- Area code: 814
- GNIS feature ID: 1178174

Josephine is an unincorporated community in Indiana County, Pennsylvania, United States. The community is 4.7 miles (7.6 km) south of Homer City. Josephine has a post office, with ZIP code 15750.
