= Vintondale, Pennsylvania =

Borough in Pennsylvania, US

- Borough
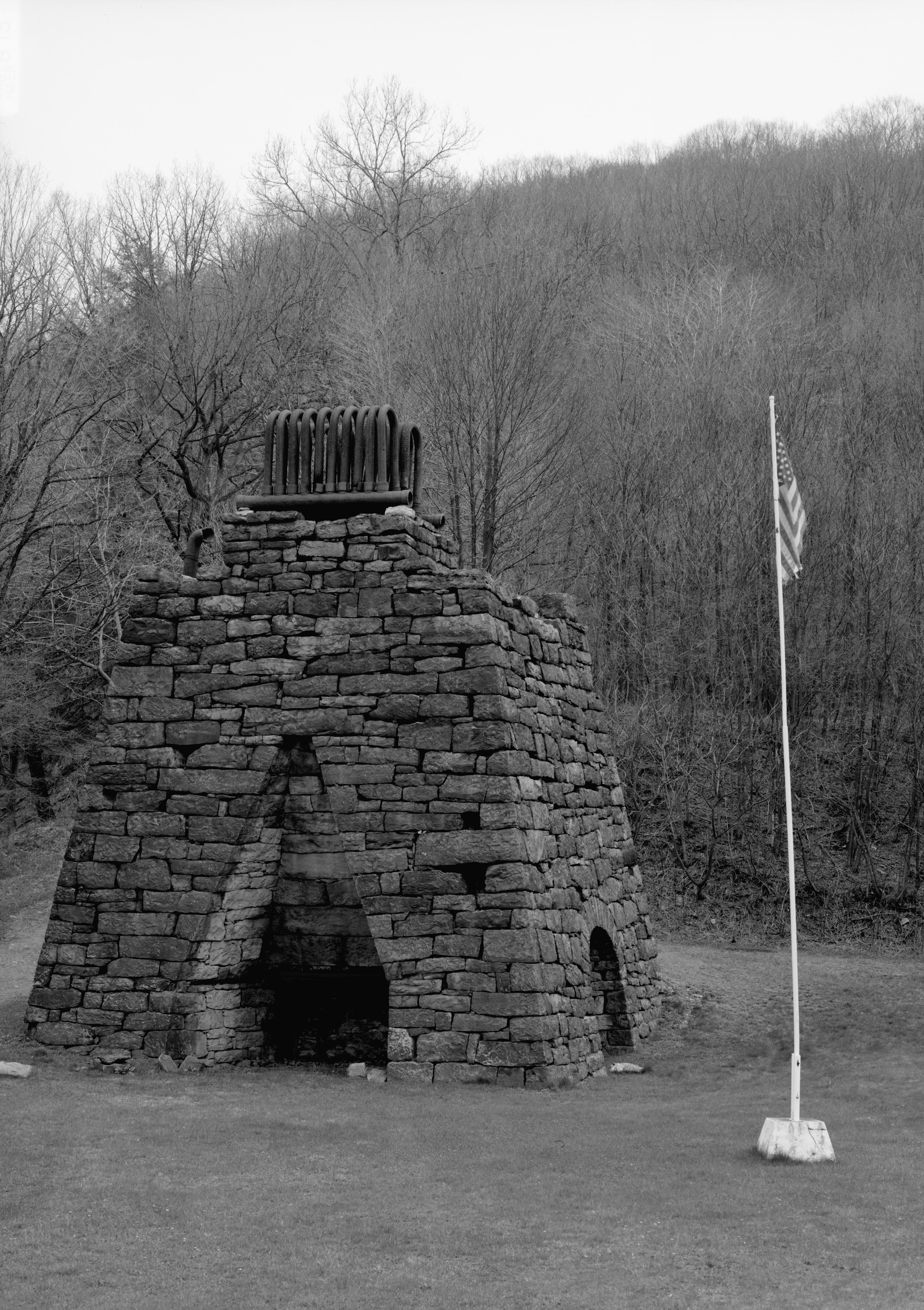
- Eliza Furnace, a historic site in the borough

- Location of Vintondale in Cambria County, Pennsylvania.

- Location within Pennsylvania
- Coordinates: 40°28′42″N 78°54′51″W
- Country: United States
- State: Pennsylvania
- County: Cambria
- Incorporated: 1907

Government
  - Type: Borough council

Area
  - Total: 0.49 sq mi (1.26 km^{2})
  - Land: 0.47 sq mi (1.22 km^{2})
  - Water: 0.015 sq mi (0.04 km^{2})
- Elevation: 1,408 ft (429 m)

Population (2020)
  - Total: 412
  - Density: 876.9/sq mi (338.57/km^{2})
- Time zone: UTC-5 (Eastern (EST))
  - Summer (DST): UTC-4 (EDT)
- ZIP code: 15961
- Area code: 814
- FIPS code: 42-80288
- GNIS feature ID: 1215037

Vintondale is a borough in Cambria County, Pennsylvania, United States. It is part of the Johnstown, Pennsylvania Metropolitan Statistical Area. As of the 2020 census, Vintondale had a population of 412.

== History ==
Vintondale was founded by Warren Delano IV, maternal uncle of President Franklin Delano Roosevelt in 1892. He was a property owner and mayor of the town. The town was described as "wild and wooly" upon its founding. The Vinton Colliery Company operated in the town and ran 6 mines, 152 coke ovens, and one of the first long wall mining operations within the U.S. It was the scene of many clashes between company guard and union organizers. Significantly, during a 1922 strike, New York lawyer for the then fledgling American Civil Liberties Union, Arthur Garfield Hayes was imprisoned in the towns small jail with only one cell for 30 minutes for trespassing on company property -the staircase outside the company store. He was released on bail.

To the north of town, the old Eliza Furnace sits on the Ghost Town Trail. At its peak the furnace produced about 1,080 tons of iron annually, employed over 90 men and boys, and used 45 mules. The furnace was listed on the National Register of Historic Places in 1991.

== Geography ==
Vintondale is located on the western border of Cambria County at 40°28′42″N 78°54′51″W (40.478370, -78.914097), along the South Branch of Blacklick Creek. It is at the approximate midpoint of the Ghost Town Trail, a rail trail extending through Cambria and Indiana counties.

Vintondale is 13 miles (21 km) west of Ebensburg, the Cambria County seat, 14 miles (23 km) north of the city of Johnstown, and 21 miles (34 km) southeast of the borough of Indiana.

According to the United States Census Bureau, Vintondale has a total area of 0.49 square miles (1.26 km^{2}), of which 0.47 square miles (1.22 km^{2}) is land and 0.02 square miles (0.04 km^{2}), or 3.49%, is water.

== Landscape art ==
Vintondale is the home of Litmus Gardens, an environmental art project. As well, landscape architect Julie Bargmann collaborated with various artists, historians, hydrologist, and members of the local community to reconstruct Vintondale, Pennsylvania's acid mine drainage into Vintondale Reclamation Park.

== Demographics ==
Historical population
Census	Pop.	Note	%±
1910	1,410		—
1920	2,053		45.6%
1930	1,658		−19.2%
1940	1,516		−8.6%
1950	1,185		−21.8%
1960	938		−20.8%
1970	812		−13.4%
1980	697		−14.2%
1990	582		−16.5%
2000	528		−9.3%
2010	414		−21.6%
2020	412		−0.5%
U.S. Decennial Census

As of the census of 2000, there were 528 people, 210 households, and 145 families residing in the borough. The population density was 1,143.7 inhabitants per square mile (441.6/km^{2}). There were 231 housing units at an average density of 500.4 per square mile (193.2/km^{2}). The racial makeup of the borough was 100.00% White. Hispanic or Latino of any race were 0.76% of the population.

There were 210 households, out of which 29.0% had children under the age of 18 living with them, 54.8% were married couples living together, 11.0% had a female householder with no husband present, and 30.5% were non-families. 26.7% of all households were made up of individuals, and 21.0% had someone living alone who was 65 years of age or older. The average household size was 2.51 and the average family size was 3.04.

In the borough the population was spread out, with 22.3% under the age of 18, 7.0% from 18 to 24, 24.8% from 25 to 44, 24.1% from 45 to 64, and 21.8% who were 65 years of age or older. The median age was 42 years. For every 100 females there were 102.3 males. For every 100 females age 18 and over, there were 96.2 males.

The median income for a household in the borough was $22,386, and the median income for a family was $34,688. Males had a median income of $25,000 versus $11,908 for females. The per capita income for the borough was $11,689. About 9.4% of families and 8.6% of the population were below the poverty line, including 2.8% of those under age 18 and 6.6% of those age 65 or over.
