= Blacklick Creek (Pennsylvania) =

Creek in Pennsylvania, United States

Coordinates: 40.47111°N 79.11323°W

Blacklick Creek is a tributary of the Conemaugh River, approximately 30 mi (48 km) long, in western Pennsylvania in the United States.

It rises in two forks in western Cambria County, on the western side of the Allegheny Mountains. The North Branch, approximately 12 mi (19 km) long, rises north of Colver and flows west, then southwest. The South Branch rises near Revloc and flows west. The branches meet at Rexis, near the boundary between Cambria and Indiana counties. The main branch flows west, receiving Two Lick Creek near Josephine, approximately 10 mi (16 km) SSW of Indiana, then WSW to join the Conemaugh approximately 3 mi (5 km) WNW of Blairsville.

The name, which is also the name of the township that contains most of the northern branch and part of the southern branch, probably refers to the fact that the stream (or "lick") often passes over outcroppings of coal ("black" minerals) in its bed and its banks.

== See also ==
- Blacklick Township, Cambria County, Pennsylvania
- List of rivers of Pennsylvania
- List of tributaries of the Allegheny River
