= Penns Manor Area Junior/Senior High School =

Coordinates: 40.63917°N 78.94472°W

Location
- 6003 Route 553 Highway; Cherryhill Township, Indiana County, Pennsylvania; Clymer, Pennsylvania 15728

Information
- School type: Public Junior/Senior High School
- Opened: 1960
- School district: Penns Manor Area
- Superintendent: Zander Sekerak
- Principal: Grant Casses
- Head of school: Mark Mento
- Teaching staff: 31.58 (FTE)
- Grades: 6-12
- Enrollment: 433 (2018–19)
- Student to teacher ratio: 13.71
- Colors: Blue and White
- Team name: Comets
- Communities served: Clymer, Heilwood
- Feeder schools: Penns Manor Elementary School

Penns Manor Area High School is a public high school in Indiana County, Pennsylvania, serving the communities of Clymer and Heilwood, as well as Cherryhill and Pine Townships. The campus is located between the communities at the junction/multiplex of Routes 403, 553, and 580.

== School History ==
Penns Manor Joint School District was formed in 1952 when the Clymer, Pine Township, and Cherryhill school districts came together. The current high school was built in 1960 and the former high schools were then used as elementary schools. When deciding on a name for the school, the suggestions included Pinemer and Penns Manor, among others. Penns Manor was chosen and the new high school was opened in the fall of 1960. A complete, $6.9 Million Dollar renovation was completed in 1994.

== Vocational Education ==
Students in grades 10-12 have the opportunity to attend the Indiana County Technology Center in White Township for part of their school day if they wish to obtain training in a specific area that the ICTC offers.

== Athletics ==
=== Boys Athletics ===
- Basketball - Class AA
- Cross Country - Class A
- Football - Class A
- Track and Field - Class AA

=== Girls Athletics ===
- Basketball - Class AA
- Cross Country - Class A
- Softball - Class A
- Track and Field - Class A
- Volleyball - Class A

== See also ==
- Penns Manor Area School District
