= Pennsylvania Route 403 =

State highway in Pennsylvania, US

Pennsylvania Route 403

Route information
- Maintained by PennDOT
- Length: 63.922 mi (102.872 km)

Major junctions
- South end: US 30 in Kantner
- US 219 in Davidsville; PA 56 in Johnstown; US 22 in East Wheatfield Township; US 422 near Heilwood; PA 286 in Clymer
- North end: US 119 near Marion Center

Location
- Country: United States
- State: Pennsylvania
- Counties: Somerset, Cambria, Indiana

Highway system
- Pennsylvania State Route System; Interstate; US; State; Scenic; Legislative
← PA 402	→ PA 404

Pennsylvania Route 403 (PA 403) is a north–south state route in Somerset, Cambria and Indiana counties of Pennsylvania. The southern terminus is at U.S. Route 30 (US 30) in the hamlet of Kantner in Quemahoning Township. The northern terminus is at US 119 near Marion Center.

== Route description ==
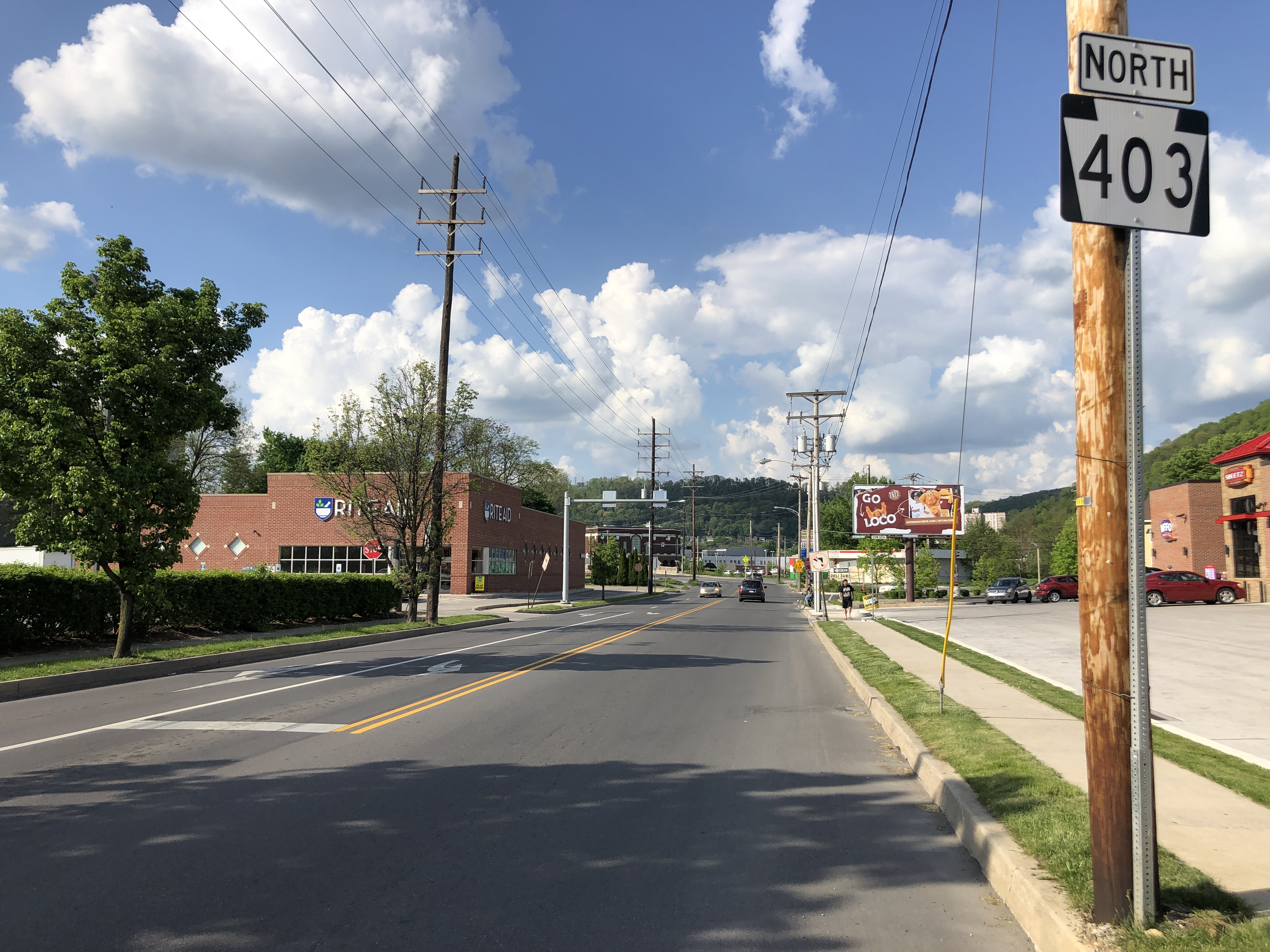
PA 403 northbound past PA 756 in Johnstown

=== Somerset County ===
PA 403 begins at an intersection with US 30 in Quemahoning Township, Somerset County, heading northeast on two-lane undivided Triple S Road. The road becomes Whistler Road as it passes through wooded areas with some homes and industrial establishments, crossing the Stonycreek River. The route turns east and passes through the residential community of Kantner, crossing the river again. PA 403 curves to the northeast and crosses CSX's S&C Subdivision railroad line, continuing through woodland with a few residences. The road heads into Shade Township and turns to the north, running to the east of the Stonycreek River and the railroad line. The route enters Quemahoning Township again and turns east, heading into the borough of Hooversville. Here, PA 403 becomes Barn Street and runs northeast past homes. The road curves northeast into wooded areas with some residences before turning north back into Quemahoning Township. The route becomes Whistler Road again and runs through forests with some fields and homes, turning west to cross the CSX line and the river before turning north again and passing through Blough. PA 403 crosses the Stonycreek River into Paint Township and heads across the CSX line again, passing through Landstreet and continuing through more rural areas to the northeast of the river and railroad tracks.

The road turns north into the borough of Benson and becomes Border Street, heading through more woods before entering residential areas. The route turns west and crosses the railroad tracks before turning north onto Whistler Street and crossing the Stonycreek River into Conemaugh Township. PA 403 intersects PA 601 and heads northwest past homes and some businesses on South Main Street, running through Hollsopple. The road widens into a four-lane divided highway and turns north as it comes to an interchange with the US 219 freeway. The route becomes two lanes and undivided again as it heads into the residential community of Davidsville, turning northeast onto Oak Street. PA 403 passes more homes and turns north as North Main Street before heading northeast as Tire Hill Road into farmland with some woods and homes. The road curves north into more wooded areas with some residential and commercial development, turning northwest and passing through Tire Hill.

=== Cambria County ===
PA 403 enters Upper Yoder Township in Cambria County and comes to an intersection with the northern terminus of PA 985, where it turns northeast onto Ferndale Avenue, a three-lane road with a center left-turn lane. The road heads east along the northern bank of the Stonycreek River, running through residential and commercial areas. The route turns southeast and becomes a divided highway, running through wooded areas before crossing into the borough of Ferndale. Here, PA 403 turns north and passes through residential neighborhoods as an undivided road, curving to the northwest past more homes with some businesses. The road heads north and crosses the CSX railroad line, turning northeast to cross the Stonycreek River into the city of Johnstown, where it crosses the Jim Mayer Riverswalk Trail. Here, the route becomes Bridge Street and passes through industrial areas, turning north-northeast onto Central Avenue. PA 403 runs through more industry and commercial areas, coming to an intersection with the western terminus of PA 756. The road turns north and widens to four lanes, crossing the Jim Mayer Riverswalk Trail before heading across the Stonycreek River again and passing west of Greater Johnstown High School. The route turns northwest onto two-lane Valley Pike and passes homes and businesses along the southwestern bank of the Stonycreek River before heading north on Franklin Street and running between woods to the west and the river to the east with some development. PA 403 heads northwest into residential areas on Napoleon Street, passing under the PA 56 freeway. The road heads into commercial areas and crosses PA 271 before crossing the Stonycreek River and heading along the edge of downtown Johnstown.

The route comes to an intersection with PA 56, where it turns north to form a concurrency with that route on four-lane divided Johns Street. PA 56/PA 403 passes between the river to the west and residential and commercial areas to the east splitting from Johns Street and heading northwest to cross the Stonycreek River. The two routes continue north along the west bank of the Conemaugh River, with woods to the west. The road becomes undivided Roosevelt Boulevard and passes under Norfolk Southern's Pittsburgh Line, heading into commercial areas. PA 56/PA 403 turns northwest onto Broad Street and continues past more businesses with some homes. PA 56 splits to the west and PA 403 narrows to two lanes, curving to the north. The route turns east onto Laurel Avenue and crosses the Conemaugh River and a Lehigh Valley Rail Management railroad line, quickly turning north onto Cooper Avenue. The road heads through residential areas as a three-lane road with a center left-turn lane. PA 403 heads into West Taylor Township and heads northwest into wooded areas with some homes as a two-lane road. The road continues into dense forests as Cramer Pike, running northeast of the Conemaugh River and the Norfolk Southern line. Farther northwest, the route heads into the Gallitzin State Forest and briefly heads through Jackson Township.

=== Indiana County ===
PA 403 enters East Wheatfield Township in Indiana County and runs through more of the state forest. The road leaves the Gallitzin State Forest and heads north away from the Conemaugh River, passing through more wooded areas with some homes and intersecting the northern terminus of PA 711 in Cramer. The route winds northwest through woodland with farmland and residences, turning north and coming to an interchange with US 22. Past here, PA 403 turns northeast through more rural areas and passes through Virginia, crossing the Blacklick Creek into Buffington Township. The road runs through Dilltown and continues northeast through wooded areas with some farm fields and homes. The route turns north, curving to the north-northeast as it crosses into Pine Township and comes to an intersection with US 422 in Strongstown. Past this intersection, PA 403 runs through more rural areas with some residences, curving to the north. The road turns west at Pineton and heads into forested areas, winding to the north as it comes to the residential community of Heilwood and heads northeast. The route passes a few rural homes as it comes to an intersection with PA 553. Here, PA 403 turns northwest to form a concurrency with PA 553 on an unnamed road, heading into Cherryhill Township and turning to the west as it passes through farmland and woodland with some homes. PA 403 splits from PA 553 by heading north-northwest, passing through more rural areas as it comes to a junction with the southern terminus of PA 580.

The road continues northwest and winds through wooded areas with a few residences, running to the southwest of North Branch Two Lick Creek. The route heads into the borough of Clymer and enters residential areas as 1st Street, turning southwest onto Hancock Street and northwest onto 2nd Street. PA 403 reaches an intersection with PA 286 and turns southwest to join that route on Franklin Street, passing homes and businesses in the center of town. PA 403 splits from PA 286 by turning northwest onto 6th Street, passing a few commercial establishments before turning into Penn Street and heading north past homes. The road heads into woodland and becomes unnamed as it crosses back into Cherryhill Township and runs to the west of a R.J. Corman Railroad line. The route passes through Rembrandt and stops following the railroad tracks as it continues into Green Township. Here, PA 403 heads into a mix of farmland and woods with some homes, passing through Dixonville and turning northwest, entering Rayne Township. The route continues through rural areas and passes through Rayne. Farther northwest, the road crosses into East Mahoning Township and becomes South Manor Street, soon heading into the borough of Marion Center. PA 403 turns west onto West Main Street and runs through more residential areas, crossing back into East Mahoning Township and heading across a Buffalo and Pittsburgh Railroad line before ending at US 119.

== Major intersections ==
County	Location	mi	km	Destinations	Notes
Somerset	Quemahoning Township	0.000	0.000	US 30 (Lincoln Highway) to PA 281 – Bedford, Somerset, Greensburg	Southern terminus
Somerset	Conemaugh Township	9.908	15.945	PA 601 (Penn Avenue / Seanor Road) – Paint, Jerome	
Somerset	Conemaugh Township	10.575– 10.791	17.019– 17.366	US 219 – Somerset, Johnstown	Interchange; northbound US 219 access via Woodstown Highway (SR 4035)
Cambria	Upper Yoder Township	16.208	26.084	PA 985 south (Ferndale Avenue) / Old Country Road	Northern terminus of PA 985
Cambria	Johnstown	18.637	29.993	PA 756 east (Ohio Street) – Geistown	Western terminus of PA 756
Cambria	Johnstown	20.348	32.747	PA 271 (Haynes Street) to PA 56 east	
Cambria	Johnstown	20.668	33.262	PA 56 east (Johnstown Expressway)	South end of PA 56 overlap
Cambria	Johnstown	22.563	36.312	PA 56 west (Fairfield Avenue)	North end of PA 56 overlap
Indiana	East Wheatfield Township	29.268	47.102	PA 711 south / Front Street – Seward	Northern terminus of PA 711
Indiana	East Wheatfield Township	32.047– 32.154	51.575– 51.747	US 22 (William Penn Highway) – Blairsville, Ebensburg	Interchange
Indiana	Pine Township	40.803	65.666	US 422 (Benjamin Franklin Highway) – Ebensburg, Indiana	
Indiana	Pine Township	47.859– 47.936	77.022– 77.146	PA 553 east – Alverda	South end of PA 553 overlap
Indiana	Cherryhill Township	50.121	80.662	PA 553 west / School Road – Penn Run	North end of PA 553 overlap
Indiana	Cherryhill Township	50.711	81.611	PA 580 north (Manor Road) – Pine Flats	Southern terminus of PA 580
Indiana	Clymer	54.959	88.448	PA 286 east (Franklin Street) – Mahaffey	South end of PA 286 overlap
Indiana	Clymer	55.434	89.212	PA 286 west (Franklin Street) / 6th Street – Indiana	North end of PA 286 overlap
Indiana	East Mahoning Township	63.922	102.872	US 119 (Buffalo-Pittsburgh Highway) – Indiana, Punxsutawney	Northern terminus
1.000 mi = 1.609 km; 1.000 km = 0.621 mi: Concurrency terminus
