= Pennsylvania Route 553 =

State highway in Pennsylvania, US

Pennsylvania Route 553

Route information
- Maintained by PennDOT
- Length: 19.458 mi (31.315 km)

Major junctions
- West end: US 422 in Cherryhill Township
- PA 403 in Cherryhill Township; PA 271 in Barr Township
- East end: US 219 in East Carroll Township

Location
- Country: United States
- State: Pennsylvania
- Counties: Indiana, Cambria

Highway system
- Pennsylvania State Route System; Interstate; US; State; Scenic; Legislative
← PA 552	→ PA 554

Pennsylvania Route 553 (PA 553) is a 19.5-mile-long (31.4 km) state highway located in Indiana and Cambria counties in Pennsylvania. The western terminus is at U.S. Route 422 (US 422) in Cherryhill Township. The eastern terminus is at US 219 in East Carroll Township.

== Route description ==
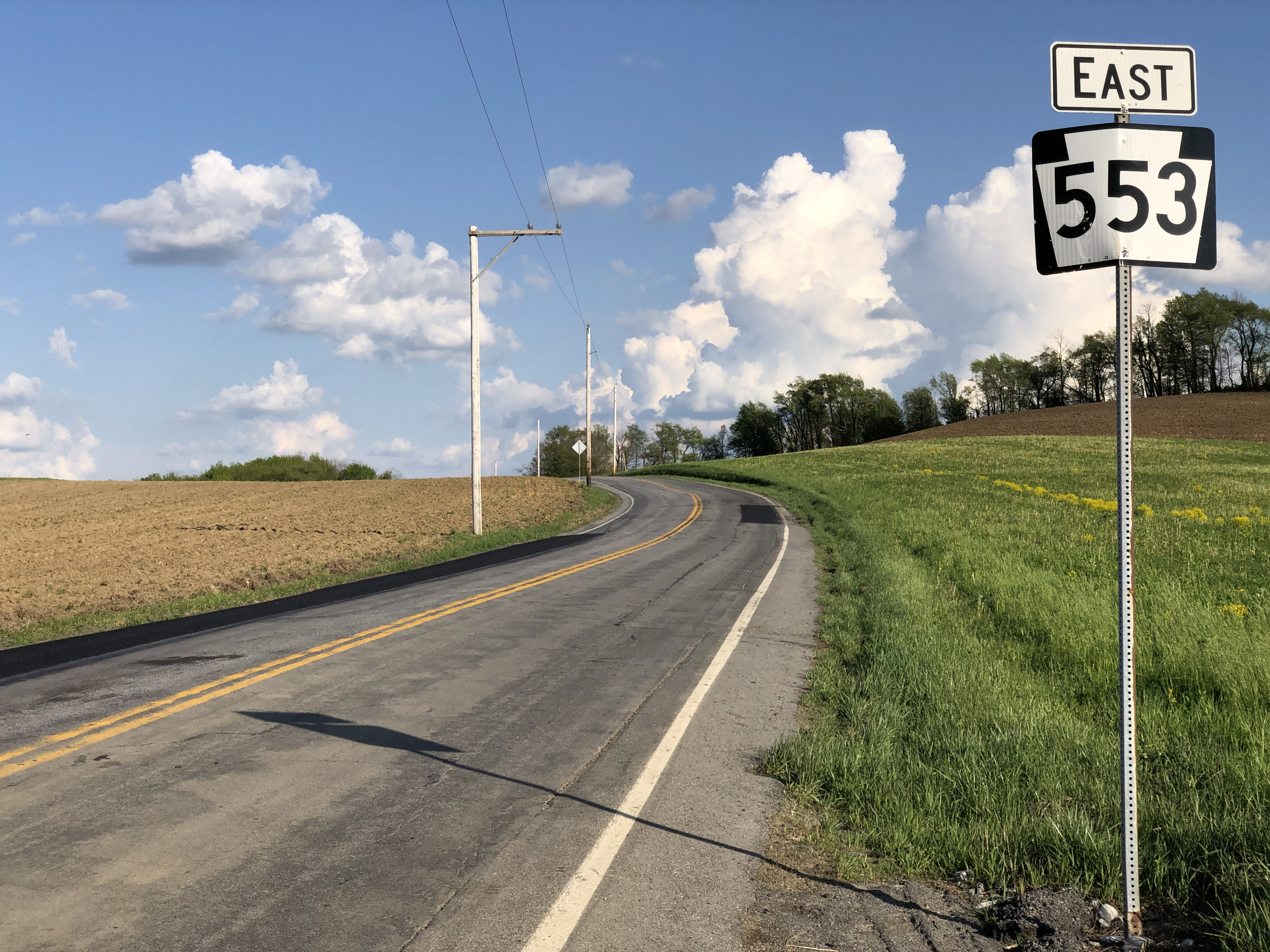
PA 553 eastbound in West Carroll Township

PA 553 begins at an interchange with access to and from the westbound direction of the US 422 freeway in Cherryhill Township, Indiana County, heading east on a two-lane undivided road. The route heads east-northeast through a mix of farms and woods, curving northeast as it passes through the residential community of Penn Run. The road turns east-northeast into more open agricultural areas with some homes, passing through Manor. PA 553 continues into a mix of farmland and woodland with residences as it comes to an intersection with PA 403. At this point, PA 403 turns east to form a concurrency with PA 553, passing through more rural areas. The road turns southeast and crosses into Pine Township, where PA 403 turns to the southwest and PA 553 turns to the northeast. The route passes through Jewtown and heads through more wooded areas with some fields and homes, curving to the east. The road passes through Mentcle and briefly becomes Mentcle Road before becoming unnamed again. PA 553 heads east-southeast through the residential community of Alverda prior to continuing through more woodland.

PA 553 enters Barr Township in Cambria County and becomes Alverda Road, heading through more wooded areas with some farms and homes. The road curves southeast into open farmland before reaching the residential community of Nicktown, where it intersects PA 271. Here, PA 271 turns east to form a concurrency with PA 553 on Ridge Road, passing through more of the community. The road heads into agricultural areas where PA 271 turns to the north and PA 553 runs to the southeast. The road continues through a mix of farmland and woodland with occasional residences, crossing into West Carroll Township and turning to the east. PA 553 heads through more rural areas, entering East Carroll Township and turning south to reach its eastern terminus at US 219.

== Major intersections ==
County	Location	mi	km	Destinations	Notes
Indiana	Cherryhill Township	0.000	0.000	US 422 west (Benjamin Franklin Highway)	Interchange; western terminus; US 422 west entrance / US 422 east exit only
Indiana	Cherryhill Township	5.706	9.183	PA 403 north / School Road – Kenwood, Clymer	West end of PA 403 overlap
Indiana	Pine Township	7.891– 7.936	12.699– 12.772	PA 403 south (Cramer Pike) – Heilwood	East end of PA 403 overlap
Cambria	Barr Township	14.164	22.795	PA 271 south (Blue Goose Road) – Nanty Glo	West end of PA 271 overlap
Cambria	Barr Township	14.741– 14.809	23.723– 23.833	PA 271 north (Nicktown Hill Road) – Northern Cambria	East end of PA 271 overlap
Cambria	East Carroll Township	19.458	31.315	US 219 (Plank Road) – Northern Cambria, Ebensburg	Eastern terminus
1.000 mi = 1.609 km; 1.000 km = 0.621 mi: Concurrency terminus; Incomplete access
