= George Diehl Homestead =

Historic house in Pennsylvania, United States

- U.S. National Register of Historic Places
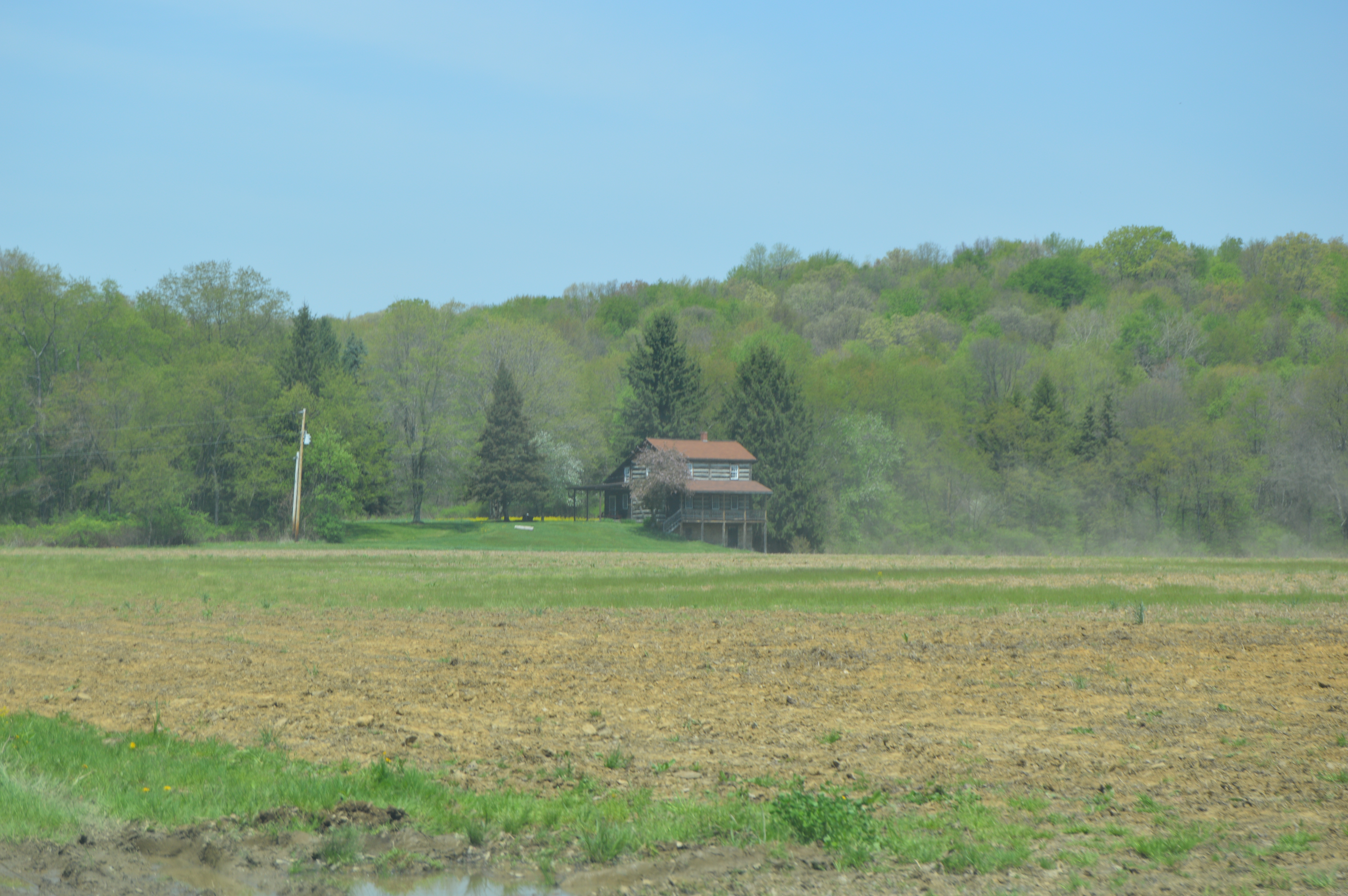
- Road view

- Location within Pennsylvania Location within the United States
- Location: East of U.S. Route 422 on Diehl Road, east of Indiana, Cherryhill Township, Pennsylvania
- Coordinates: 40°36′29″N 78°58′44″W
- Area: less than one acre
- Built: c. 1840
- Architectural style: corner post log house
- NRHP reference No.: 87000672
- Added to NRHP: April 30, 1987

The George Diehl Homestead is an historic home that is located in Cherryhill Township, Indiana County, Pennsylvania, United States.

It was added to the National Register of Historic Places in 1987.

== History and architectural features ==
Built circa 1840, this historic structure is a 2 1/2-story, rectangular, hewn-log building with a gable roof. It measures eighteen feet, six inches wide and twenty-eight feet, four inches long, and features mortise and tenon jointing, also known as corner-post construction, for the log structure. A fourteen-foot by twenty-eight-foot, four-inch, shed-roofed addition was built circa 1850.
