= Diamondville =

Diamondville may refer to:

- Diamondville microprocessor, an Intel Atom microprocessor
- Diamondville, California
- Diamondville, Pennsylvania
- Diamondville, Wyoming
