= Penns Manor Area School District =

School district in Pennsylvania

Location
- Clymer, Pennsylvania United States

District information
- Established: 1952
- Superintendent: Darren Johnston

Other information
- Website: www.pennsmanor.org

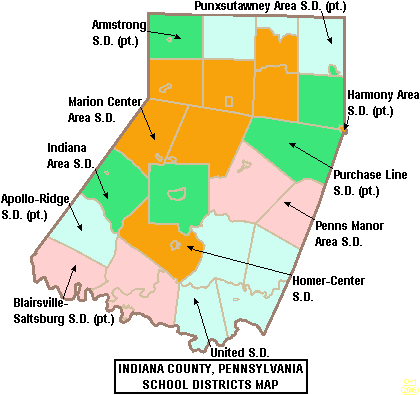
Map of the Indiana County, Pennsylvania School Districts

Penns Manor Area School District is located at 6001 Route 553 Highway Clymer, Pennsylvania. It also serves Cherryhill and Pine Townships.

== History ==
Penns Manor Joint School District was formed in 1952 when the Clymer, Pine Township, and Cherryhill school districts came together. The current Penns Manor Area Junior/Senior High School was built in 1960 and the former high schools were then used as elementary schools. When deciding on a name for the school, the suggestions included Pinemer and Penns Manor, among others. Penns Manor was chosen and the new high school was opened in the fall of 1960. In 1979, construction of the elementary school building was completed and it opened in the fall of 1980. The old high schools, then functioning as grade schools, were shut down and all elementary students came to the new building. In 1994, the high school completed a 6.9 million dollar renovation. The renovation of the elementary was completed in 2005.

== Demographics ==
The Penns Manor Area School District serves approximately 900 students. The district covers 81 square miles. It has a dropout rate of 0.49%. Approximately 98% of the students are white (non-Hispanic), and approximately 1% are black or African-American.
