= Jewtown, Pennsylvania =

Unincorporated community in Pennsylvania, US

- Unincorporated community
- Location within Pennsylvania Location within the United States
- Coordinates: 40°37′53″N 78°54′21″W
- Country: United States
- State: Pennsylvania
- County: Indiana
- Township: Pine
- Elevation: 1,762 ft (537 m)
- Time zone: UTC-5 (Eastern (EST))
  - Summer (DST): UTC-4 (EDT)
- GNIS feature ID: 1178077

Jewtown, also known as North Heilwood, is an unincorporated community within Pine Township, Indiana County, Pennsylvania, United States. It is located near the southerly intersection of Pennsylvania Routes 403 and 553. The town has met several times and determined its name not to be derogatory.
