= Kantner, Pennsylvania =

Unincorporated community in Pennsylvania, US

- Unincorporated community
- Location within Pennsylvania
- Coordinates: 40°06′06″N 78°56′13″W
- Country: United States
- State: Pennsylvania
- County: Somerset
- Elevation: 1,739 ft (530 m)
- Time zone: UTC-5 (Eastern (EST))
  - Summer (DST): UTC-4 (EDT)
- ZIP code: 15548
- Area code: 814
- GNIS feature ID: 1178223

Kantner is an unincorporated community in Somerset County, Pennsylvania, United States. The community is located along Pennsylvania Route 403 near its junction with U.S. Route 30, 1 mile (1.6 km) east of Stoystown. Kantner had a post office until December 20, 2003; it still has its own ZIP code, 15548.
