= Barr Township, Pennsylvania =

Township in Pennsylvania, US

Coordinates: 40°36′32″N 78°48′10″W

- Township
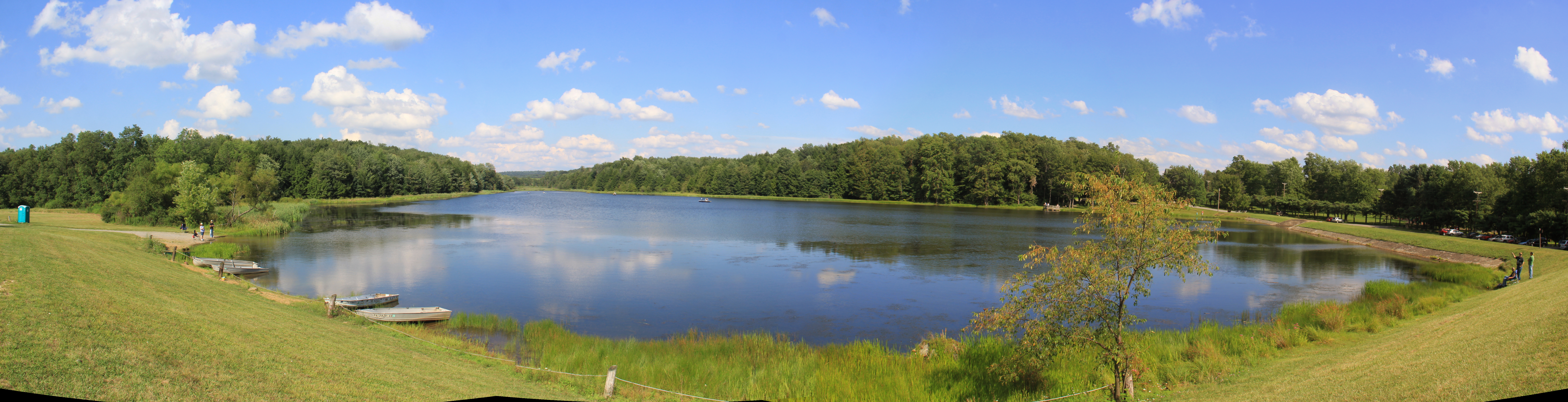
- Duman Lake County Park in Barr Township

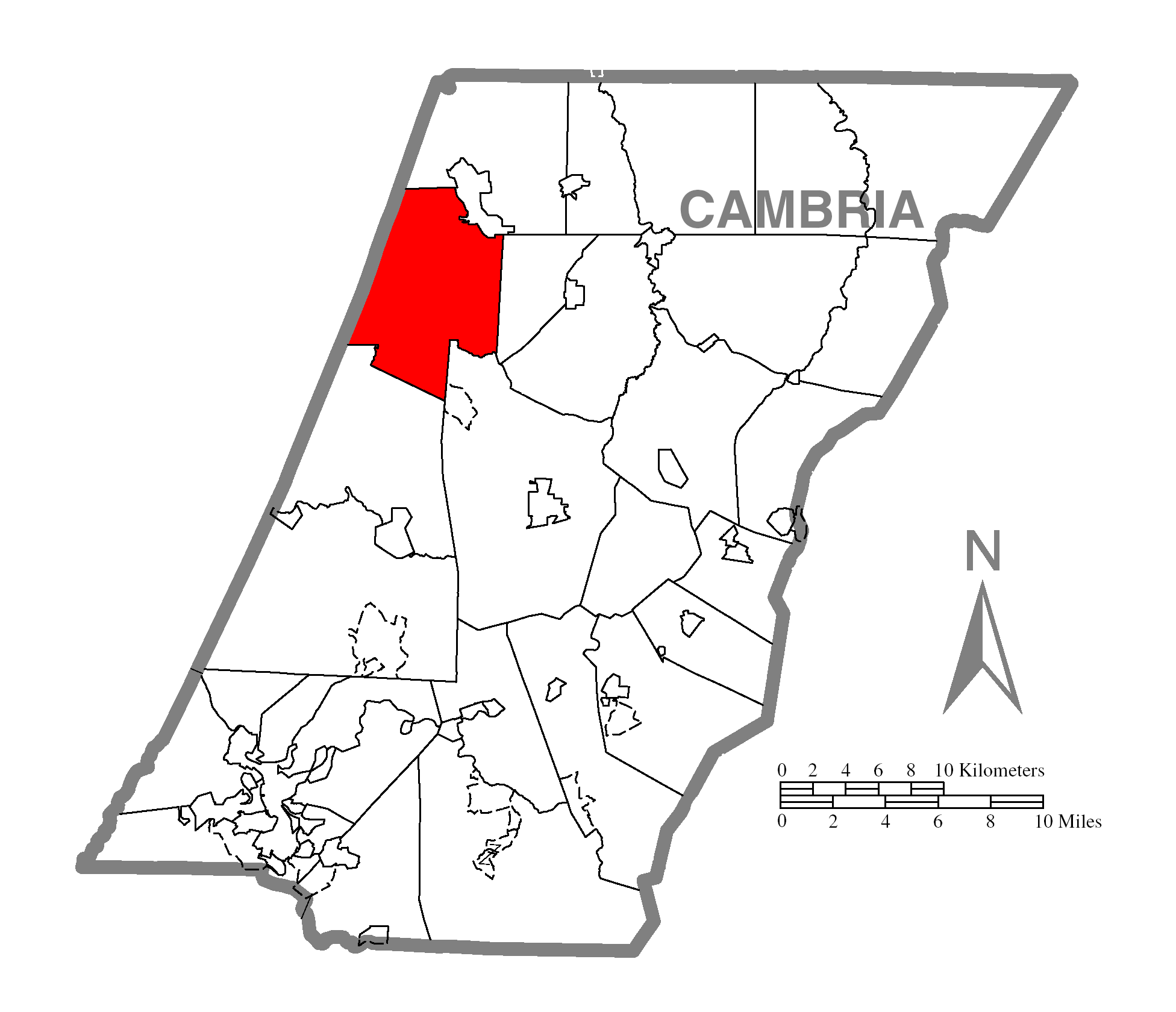
- Map of Cambria County, Pennsylvania highlighting Barr Township

- Map of Cambria County, Pennsylvania
- Country: United States
- State: Pennsylvania
- County: Cambria
- Incorporated: 1872

Area
  - Total: 31.41 sq mi (81.34 km^{2})
  - Land: 31.36 sq mi (81.21 km^{2})
  - Water: 0.050 sq mi (0.13 km^{2})

Population (2020)
  - Total: 2,057 ▲
  - Estimate (2021): 2,044
  - Density: 63.2/sq mi (24.39/km^{2})
- Time zone: UTC-5 (Eastern (EST))
  - Summer (DST): UTC-4 (EDT)
- Area code: 814
- FIPS code: 42-021-04272

Barr Township is a township in Cambria County, Pennsylvania, United States. As of the 2020 census, the township population was 2,057. It is part of the Johnstown, Pennsylvania Metropolitan Statistical Area.

== History ==
The Colver Historic District was listed on the National Register of Historic Places in 1994.

== Geography ==
Barr Township is located in northwestern Cambria County at 40.526848,-78.490448, bordered on the west by Indiana County. The borough of Northern Cambria borders the township on the northeast.

According to the United States Census Bureau, the township has a total area of 31.4 square miles (81.3 km^{2}), of which 31.4 square miles (81.2 km^{2}) is land and 0.04 square miles (0.1 km^{2}), or 0.16%, is water.

== Communities ==
=== Unincorporated communities ===
- Marsteller
- Nicktown
- Vetera
- Watkins

== Demographics ==
Historical population
| Census | Pop. | Note | %± |
|---|---|---|---|
| 2000 | 2,175 | | — |
| 2010 | 2,056 | | −5.5% |
| 2020 | 2,057 | | 0.0% |
| 2021 (est.) | 2,044 | | −0.6% |
U.S. Decennial Census

As of the census of 2000, there were 2,175 people, 753 households, and 594 families residing in the township. The population density was 68.9 inhabitants per square mile (26.6/km^{2}). There were 803 housing units at an average density of 25.5/sq mi (9.8/km^{2}). The racial makeup of the township was 99.77% White, 0.14% Native American, and 0.09% from two or more races. Hispanic or Latino of any race were 0.14% of the population.

There were 753 households, out of which 35.2% had children under the age of 18 living with them, 67.7% were married couples living together, 7.2% had a female householder with no husband present, and 21.0% were non-families. 18.9% of all households were made up of individuals, and 10.2% had someone living alone who was 65 years of age or older. The average household size was 2.87 and the average family size was 3.30.

In the township the population was spread out, with 26.8% under the age of 18, 7.8% from 18 to 24, 25.0% from 25 to 44, 25.1% from 45 to 64, and 15.3% who were 65 years of age or older. The median age was 39 years. For every 100 females, there were 97.2 males. For every 100 females age 18 and over, there were 95.8 males.

The median income for a household in the township was $34,107, and the median income for a family was $36,813. Males had a median income of $28,750 versus $19,735 for females. The per capita income for the township was $13,444. About 11.2% of families and 12.4% of the population were below the poverty line, including 13.9% of those under age 18 and 7.1% of those age 65 or over.
