= Marsteller, Pennsylvania =

Unincorporated community in Pennsylvania, US

- Unincorporated community
- Nickname: Moss Creek
- Location within Pennsylvania
- Coordinates: 40°39′02″N 78°48′29″W
- Country: United States
- State: Pennsylvania
- County: Cambria
- Township: Barr
- Elevation: 1,549 ft (472 m)
- Time zone: UTC-5 (Eastern (EST))
  - Summer (DST): UTC-4 (EDT)
- ZIP code: 15760
- Area code: 814
- GNIS feature ID: 1180484

Marsteller is an unincorporated community in Cambria County, Pennsylvania, United States. The community is located 1.5 miles (2.4 km) west of Northern Cambria. Marsteller had its own post office until April 23, 2005; it still has its own ZIP code, 15760.
