= Nicktown, Pennsylvania =

Unincorporated community in Pennsylvania, US

- Unincorporated community
- Location within Pennsylvania
- Coordinates: 40°36′48″N 78°48′12″W
- Country: United States
- State: Pennsylvania
- County: Cambria
- Township: Barr
- Elevation: 1,955 ft (596 m)
- Time zone: UTC-5 (Eastern (EST))
  - Summer (DST): UTC-4 (EDT)
- ZIP code: 15762
- Area code: 814
- GNIS feature ID: 1182451

Nicktown is an unincorporated community in Cambria County, Pennsylvania, United States. The community is located at the junction of Pennsylvania Route 271 and Pennsylvania Route 553, 3.4 miles (5.5 km) south-southwest of Northern Cambria. Nicktown has a post office with ZIP code 15762, which opened on November 11, 1870.

== Geology ==
Nicktown is underlain by the Pennsylvanian age Casselman Formation. The axis of the Barnesboro Syncline trends northeast west of town.

== Demographics ==
Historical population
Census	Pop.	Note	%±

The United States Census Bureau defined Nicktown as a census designated place (CDP) in 2023.
