= Mentcle, Pennsylvania =

Unincorporated community in Pennsylvania, US

- Unincorporated community
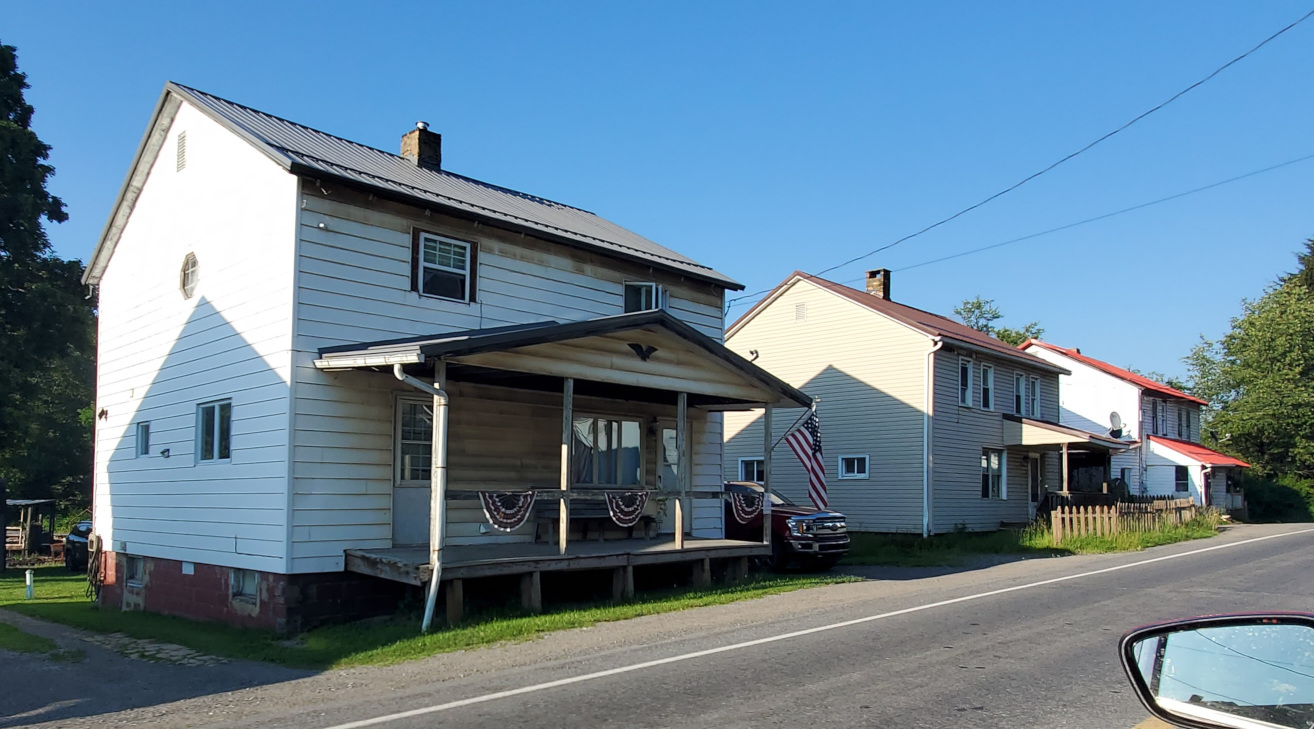
- Houses in Mentcle in 2025

- Location within Pennsylvania Location within the United States
- Coordinates: 40°38′14″N 78°52′56″W
- Country: United States
- State: Pennsylvania
- County: Indiana
- Township: Pine
- Elevation: 1,759 ft (536 m)
- Time zone: UTC-5 (Eastern (EST))
  - Summer (DST): UTC-4 (EDT)
- ZIP codes: 15761
- GNIS feature ID: 1180932

Mentcle is an unincorporated community and coal town in Pine Township, Indiana County, Pennsylvania, United States. Its post office closed in 2005.

== History ==
Mentcle Mine and the coal company patch town of Mentcle was apparently established in the early 1920s by Bethlehem Steel Corporation, which operated the captive Mentcle Mine here. During World War II, the mine and works were leased to the Redlands Coal Company, a commercial operator. Bethlehem Steel resumed operations soon after the war, and operated the Mentcle Mine on an intermittent basis. The Pine Township Company evidently leased the Mentcle Mines at a later date, but operations were shut down permanently c. 1960. At least thirty-five company owned houses were constructed in the initial years of the mine operations.

The town of Mentcle consists of approximately thirty frame coal company built houses arranged on either side of Pennsylvania Route 553 and a short loop street to the north. The houses and town were built by the Bethlehem Steel Company to house its miners from the Mentcle Mine. Single family houses are located on the south side of the highway, and double family houses are located across the road, on the north side, facing the single family houses. The handful of houses on the north side loop street may have been managers' housing. All houses are now privately owned.

The single family houses are two stories in height, and of balloon-frame construction. The front-gable houses are built on concrete block foundations and are topped with shingle roofs with brick chimneys near the center of the ridge. Shed porches extend across the front. The double family houses have the long axis facing the street. Doors are located to the sides, and again, a central chimney, serving both units, is located at the center of the gable shingle roof.

The Mentcle Mine complex was located to the north and east of the town, across Yellow Creek, along the former Cambria and Indiana Railroad. The tracks of the railroad were dismantled c. 1993 and salvaged. Three mine buildings survived c. 1993: the miners' wash house, a small boiler house, and an airshaft / fanhouse building.

The miners' wash house is a common-bond brick building, approximately 50 feet x 30 feet, with a lower extension to the west. The building rests on a concrete slab foundation and is topped by a side-gable roof with three round metal roof ventilators.

A smaller boiler house is located just east of the miners' wash house and connected to the wash house by cast-iron steam pipes; this gable-roof structure has a relatively tall brick chimney at the western end.

Approximately 50 yards (46 m) to the west of the main buildings is a mine airshaft. This brick and iron building has a shed roof and c. 1993 contained an intact 16 feet (4.9 m) diameter metal fan and housing. The fan was used to force air into the workings of the mine; the housing was connected by an airshaft.
