= Strongstown, Pennsylvania =

Unincorporated community in Pennsylvania, US

- Unincorporated community
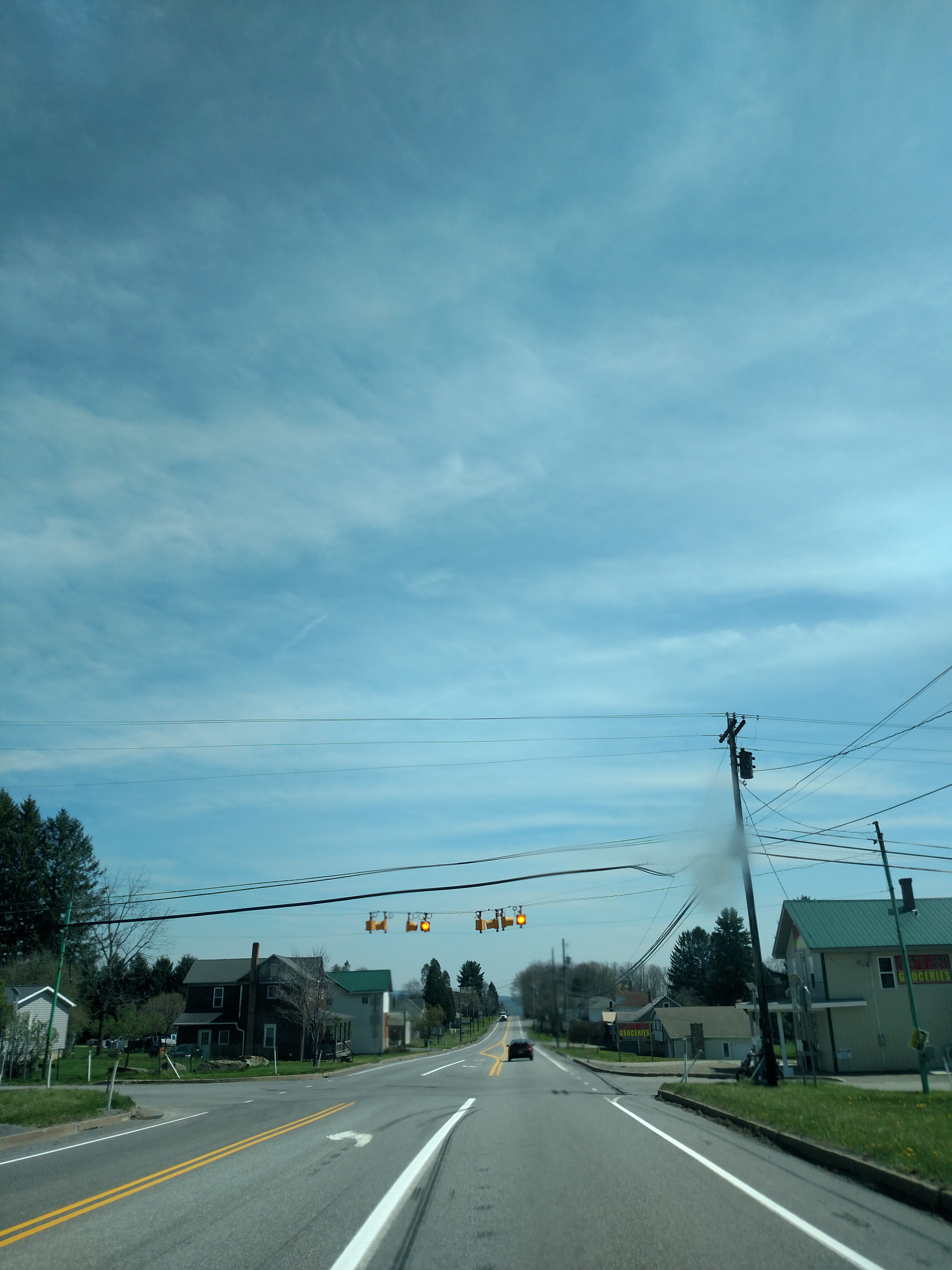
- Eastbound along US 422

- Location within Pennsylvania Location within the United States
- Coordinates: 40°33′10″N 78°55′18″W
- Country: United States
- State: Pennsylvania
- County: Indiana
- Township: Pine
- Elevation: 1,890 ft (580 m)
- Time zone: UTC-5 (Eastern (EST))
  - Summer (DST): UTC-4 (EDT)
- ZIP code: 15957
- Area code: 814
- GNIS feature ID: 1188890

Strongstown is an unincorporated community in Indiana County, Pennsylvania, United States. The community is located at the junction of U.S. Route 422 and Pennsylvania Route 403, 11.4 miles (18.3 km) west-northwest of Ebensburg.
