= Diamondville, Pennsylvania =

Unincorporated community in Pennsylvania, U.S.

Coordinates: 40.663943°N 78.967884°W

Diamondville is an unincorporated community located in Cherryhill Township, Indiana County, Pennsylvania, United States. It is located on Diamondville Road (State Route 1012) at the intersection with Railroad Avenue. The town lies within a meander of Two Lick Creek. The R.J. Corman Railroad/Pennsylvania Lines passes through Diamondville. The town was formerly known as Mitchells Mills.
