= Penn Run, Pennsylvania =

Unincorporated community in Pennsylvania, US

- Unincorporated community
- Location within Pennsylvania Location within the United States
- Coordinates: 40°37′07″N 79°00′40″W
- Country: United States
- State: Pennsylvania
- County: Indiana
- Township: Cherryhill
- Elevation: 1,470 ft (450 m)
- Time zone: UTC-5 (Eastern (EST))
  - Summer (DST): UTC-4 (EDT)
- ZIP code: 15765
- Area code: 724
- GNIS feature ID: 1183485

Penn Run is an unincorporated community in Indiana County, Pennsylvania, United States. The community is located along Pennsylvania Route 553, 7.5 miles (12.1 km) east of Indiana. Penn Run has a post office with ZIP code 15765, which opened on June 13, 1839.
