= Rossiter, Pennsylvania =

Unincorporated community in Pennsylvania, US

- Census-designated place
- Location within Pennsylvania Location within the United States
- Coordinates: 40°53′47″N 78°56′3″W
- Country: United States
- State: Pennsylvania
- County: Indiana
- Township: Canoe

Area
  - Total: 1.9 sq mi (4.8 km^{2})
  - Land: 1.9 sq mi (4.8 km^{2})

Population (2010)
  - Total: 646
  - Density: 350/sq mi (130/km^{2})
- Time zone: UTC-5 (Eastern (EST))
  - Summer (DST): UTC-4 (EDT)
- ZIP code: 15772
- Area code: 814

Rossiter is a Census-designated place (CDP) in Indiana County, Pennsylvania, United States. The population was 646 at the 2010 census.

== Geography ==
Rossiter is located at 40°53′47″N 78°56′3″W (40.896440, -78.934208).

According to the United States Census Bureau, the CDP has a total area of 1.9 square miles (4.9 km^{2}), all land.

== History ==
Rossiter was formed in 1901 as a coal mining town, and was originally named after William Rossiter, nominally the chief stockholder of the Clearfield Bituminous Coal Corporation and the treasurer of the parent New York Central Railroad, which built a branch from Punxsutawney into the town. Many of the residents went through the infamous 1927 Indiana bituminous strike. Coal mining stopped in the late 1940s when the mines shut down.

== Demographics ==
As of the census of 2000, there were 790 people, 249 households, and 169 families residing in the CDP. The population density was 424.3 inhabitants per square mile (163.8/km^{2}). There were 282 housing units at an average density of 151.4 per square mile (58.5/km^{2}). The racial makeup of the CDP was 100.00% White. Hispanic or Latino of any race were 0.25% of the population.

There were 249 households, out of which 31.7% had children under the age of 18 living with them, 47.4% were married couples living together, 14.1% had a female householder with no husband present, and 32.1% were non-families. 27.3% of all households were made up of individuals, and 18.1% had someone living alone who was 65 years of age or older. The average household size was 2.53 and the average family size was 3.07.

In the CDP, the population was spread out, with 20.5% under the age of 18, 5.4% from 18 to 24, 25.7% from 25 to 44, 22.8% from 45 to 64, and 25.6% who were 65 years of age or older. The median age was 44 years. For every 100 females, there were 99.5 males. For every 100 females age 18 and over, there were 101.9 males.

The median income for a household in the CDP was $25,577, and the median income for a family was $31,167. Males had a median income of $24,000 versus $18,333 for females. The per capita income for the CDP was $11,931. About 16.5% of families and 18.7% of the population were below the poverty line, including 17.8% of those under age 18 and 23.1% of those age 65 or over.
