= Locust, Pennsylvania =

Unincorporated community in Pennsylvania, U.S.

Coordinates: 40°51′23″N 78°58′21″W

Locust is an unincorporated community located in North Mahoning Township, Indiana County, Pennsylvania, United States.

This town is mentioned in the song "The Gift" by The Velvet Underground as the home of Waldo Jeffers. The town of Locust, which was in Canoe Township, no longer exists.
