= Dilltown, Pennsylvania =

Unincorporated community in Pennsylvania, US

- Unincorporated community
- Location within Pennsylvania Location within the United States
- Coordinates: 40°27′59″N 79°00′09″W
- Country: United States
- State: Pennsylvania
- County: Indiana
- Township: East Wheatfield
- Elevation: 1,345 ft (410 m)
- Time zone: UTC-5 (Eastern (EST))
  - Summer (DST): UTC-4 (EDT)
- ZIP code: 15929
- Area code: 814
- GNIS feature ID: 1173725

Dilltown is an unincorporated community in Indiana County, Pennsylvania, United States. The community is located along Blacklick Creek and Pennsylvania Route 403, 13.3 miles (21.4 km) southeast of Indiana. Dilltown has a post office, with ZIP code 15929.
