= Canoe Township, Pennsylvania =

Township in Pennsylvania, US

Coordinates: 40°53′00″N 78°57′00″W

- Township
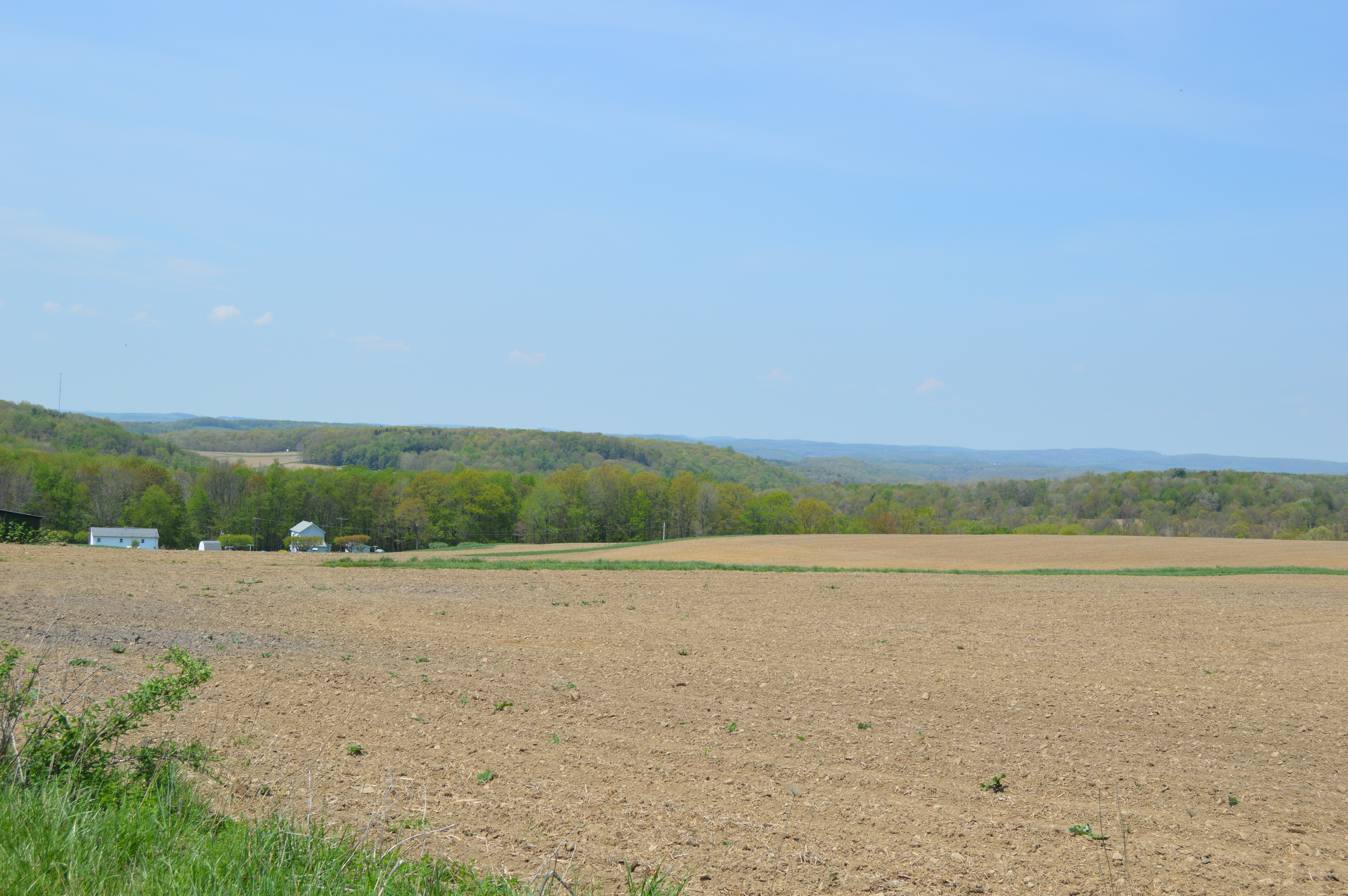
- Countryside east of Rossiter

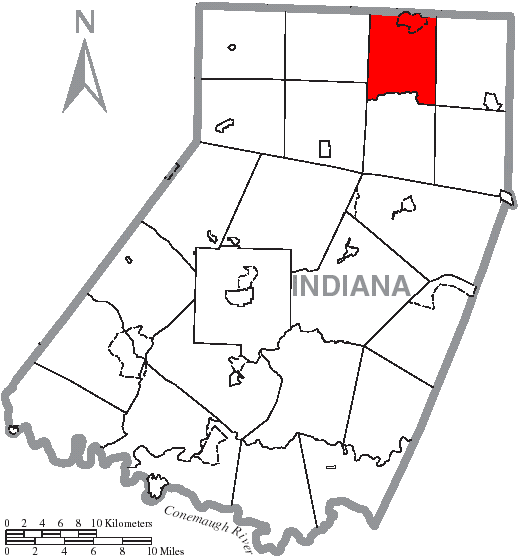
- Map of Indiana County, Pennsylvania Highlighting Canoe Township

- Map of Pennsylvania highlighting Indiana County
- Country: United States
- State: Pennsylvania
- County: Indiana

Area
  - Total: 27.12 sq mi (70.25 km^{2})
  - Land: 27.04 sq mi (70.04 km^{2})
  - Water: 0.081 sq mi (0.21 km^{2})

Population (2020)
  - Total: 1,432 ▼
  - Estimate (2021): 1,425
  - Density: 53/sq mi (20.6/km^{2})
- Time zone: UTC-5 (Eastern (EST))
  - Summer (DST): UTC-4 (EDT)
- FIPS code: 42-063-11120

Canoe Township is a township in Indiana County, Pennsylvania, United States. The population was 1,432 at the 2020 census, a decline from the figure of 1,505 tabulated in 2010. Canoe Township was formed from Montgomery Township in 1847. It was named after Canoe Creek, which was so called because its mouth on Mahoning Creek was traditionally the head of canoe navigation. The township includes the communities of Canoe Ridge, Juneau, Locust, Locust Lane, Robertsville, and Rossiter.

== Geography ==
According to the United States Census Bureau, the township has a total area of 27.1 square miles (70 km^{2}), all land.

== Demographics ==
Historical population
Census	Pop.	Note	%±
1850	888		—
1860	1,470		65.5%
1870	998		−32.1%
1880	1,217		21.9%
1890	1,276		4.8%
1900	1,290		1.1%
1910	3,809		195.3%
1920	4,357		14.4%
1930	3,606		−17.2%
1940	3,282		−9.0%
1950	2,184		−33.5%
1960	1,790		−18.0%
1970	1,545		−13.7%
1980	1,788		15.7%
1990	1,915		7.1%
2000	1,670		−12.8%
2010	1,505		−9.9%
2020	1,432		−4.9%
2021 (est.)	1,425		−0.5%
U.S. Decennial Census

As of the census of 2000, there were 1,670 people, 592 households, and 428 families residing in the township. The population density was 61.5 inhabitants per square mile (23.7/km^{2}). There were 690 housing units at an average density of 25.4/sq mi (9.8/km^{2}). The racial makeup of the township was 99.88% White, 0.06% from other races, and 0.06% from two or more races. Hispanic or Latino of any race were 0.42% of the population.

There were 592 households, out of which 31.4% had children under the age of 18 living with them, 56.8% were married couples living together, 10.6% had a female householder with no husband present, and 27.7% were non-families. 24.3% of all households were made up of individuals, and 13.5% had someone living alone who was 65 years of age or older. The average household size was 2.55 and the average family size was 3.01.

In the township the population was spread out, with 21.8% under the age of 18, 6.9% from 18 to 24, 27.7% from 25 to 44, 23.5% from 45 to 64, and 20.0% who were 65 years of age or older. The median age was 41 years. For every 100 females there were 98.8 males. For every 100 females age 18 and over, there were 103.1 males.

The median income for a household in the township was $28,393, and the median income for a family was $33,854. Males had a median income of $26,902 versus $17,763 for females. The per capita income for the township was $12,773. About 10.3% of families and 13.5% of the population were below the poverty line, including 16.5% of those under age 18 and 15.9% of those age 65 or over.
