= Alverda, Pennsylvania =

Unincorporated community in Pennsylvania, US

- Unincorporated community
- Location within Pennsylvania Location within the United States
- Coordinates: 40°37′49″N 78°51′25″W
- Country: United States
- State: Pennsylvania
- County: Indiana
- Township: Pine

Area
  - Total: 0.82 sq mi (2.12 km^{2})
  - Land: 0.82 sq mi (2.12 km^{2})
  - Water: 0 sq mi (0.00 km^{2})
- Elevation: 1,913 ft (583 m)

Population (2020)
  - Total: 279
  - Density: 340.9/sq mi (131.61/km^{2})
- Time zone: UTC-5 (Eastern (EST))
  - Summer (DST): UTC-4 (EDT)
- ZIP code: 15710
- Area code: 814
- GNIS feature ID: 1168240

Alverda is a census-designated place in Indiana County, Pennsylvania, United States. The community is located on Pennsylvania Route 553, 15.5 miles (24.9 km) east of Indiana in Pine Township.

As of the 2020 census, the community had a population of 279.

Alverda has a post office; its residents use ZIP code 15710. It includes the neighborhood of Brownstown, which had, historically, been a separate village.

== Demographics ==
Historical population
Census	Pop.	Note	%±
2020	279		—
U.S. Decennial Census

At the time of the 2020 census, there were 279 people, 122 households in the community.

The population density was 260.0 people per square mile (100.4 people/km^{2}). There were 122 housing units at an average density of 45.9 per square mile (17.7/km^{2}).

The racial makeup of the community was 93.5% White, 0.1% African American, 0.03% American Indian or Alaska Native, and 0.4% from two or more races.

There were 122 households, 32.0% had children under the age of eighteen living with them; 49.0% were married couples living together, 18.0% had a single guardian with no spouse present, and 33.0% were non-families.

== Geology ==
Most of the town of Alverda is underlain by the Pennsylvanian age Glenshaw Formation. The area just west of town is underlain by the coal-bearing Allegheny Group. The axis of the Nolo Anticline trends northeast west of town.
