= East Mahoning Township, Indiana County, Pennsylvania =

Township in Pennsylvania, US

Coordinates: 40°47′00″N 78°59′59″W

East Mahoning Township, Pennsylvania
- Township
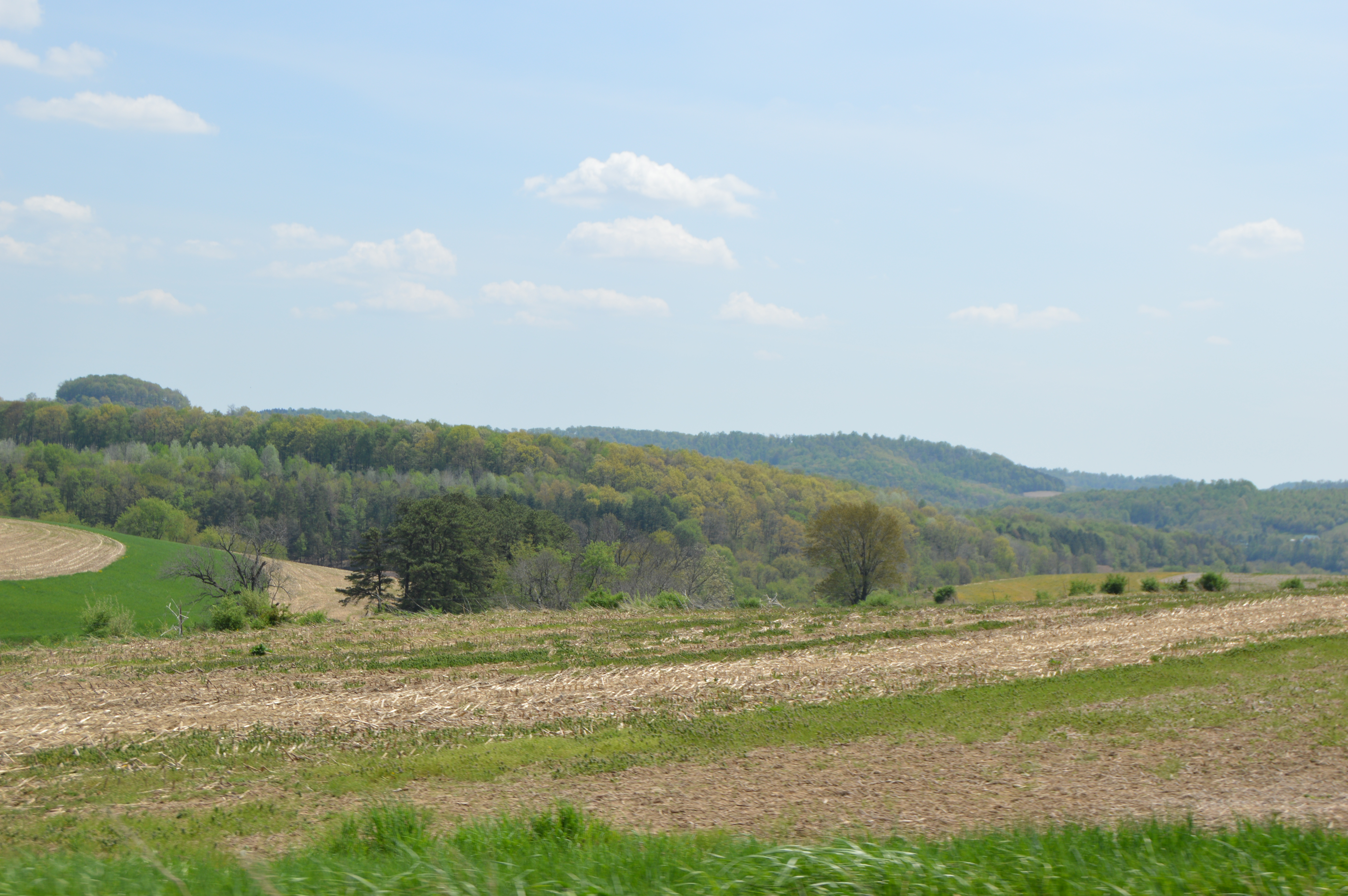
- Fields along Pennsylvania Route 210

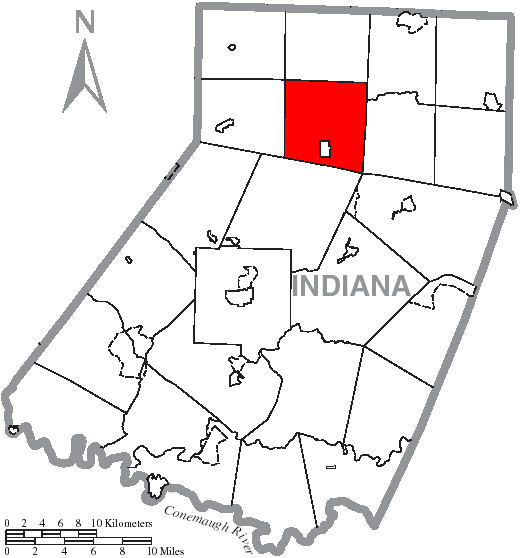
- Map of Indiana County, Pennsylvania Highlighting East Mahoning Township

- Map of Pennsylvania highlighting Indiana County
- Country: United States
- State: Pennsylvania
- County: Indiana

Area
  - Total: 31.37 sq mi (81.25 km^{2})
  - Land: 31.28 sq mi (81.01 km^{2})
  - Water: 0.093 sq mi (0.24 km^{2})

Population (2020)
  - Total: 975
  - Estimate (2021): 973
  - Density: 32.7/sq mi (12.64/km^{2})
- Time zone: UTC-5 (Eastern (EST))
  - Summer (DST): UTC-4 (EDT)
- FIPS code: 42-063-21456

East Mahoning Township is a township in Indiana County, Pennsylvania, United States. As of the 2020 census, the township population was 975, a decline from the figure of 1,077 tabulated in 2010. East Mahoning Township was created when Mahoning Township was divided into four parts (East, West, North, and South) in 1846. It contains the communities of Georgeville, Hamill, Mottarns Mill, and Savan. It surrounds, but does not include, the borough of Marion Center.

== Geography ==
According to the United States Census Bureau, the township has a total area of 31.4 square miles (81 km^{2}), all land.

== Demographics ==
Historical population
Census	Pop.	Note	%±
1850	869		—
1860	1,209		39.1%
1870	1,139		−5.8%
1880	1,163		2.1%
1890	1,099		−5.5%
1900	895		−18.6%
1910	827		−7.6%
1920	1,036		25.3%
1930	739		−28.7%
1940	818		10.7%
1950	776		−5.1%
1960	757		−2.4%
1970	723		−4.5%
1980	977		35.1%
1990	1,140		16.7%
2000	1,196		4.9%
2010	1,077		−9.9%
2020	975		−9.5%
2021 (est.)	973		−0.2%
U.S. Decennial Census

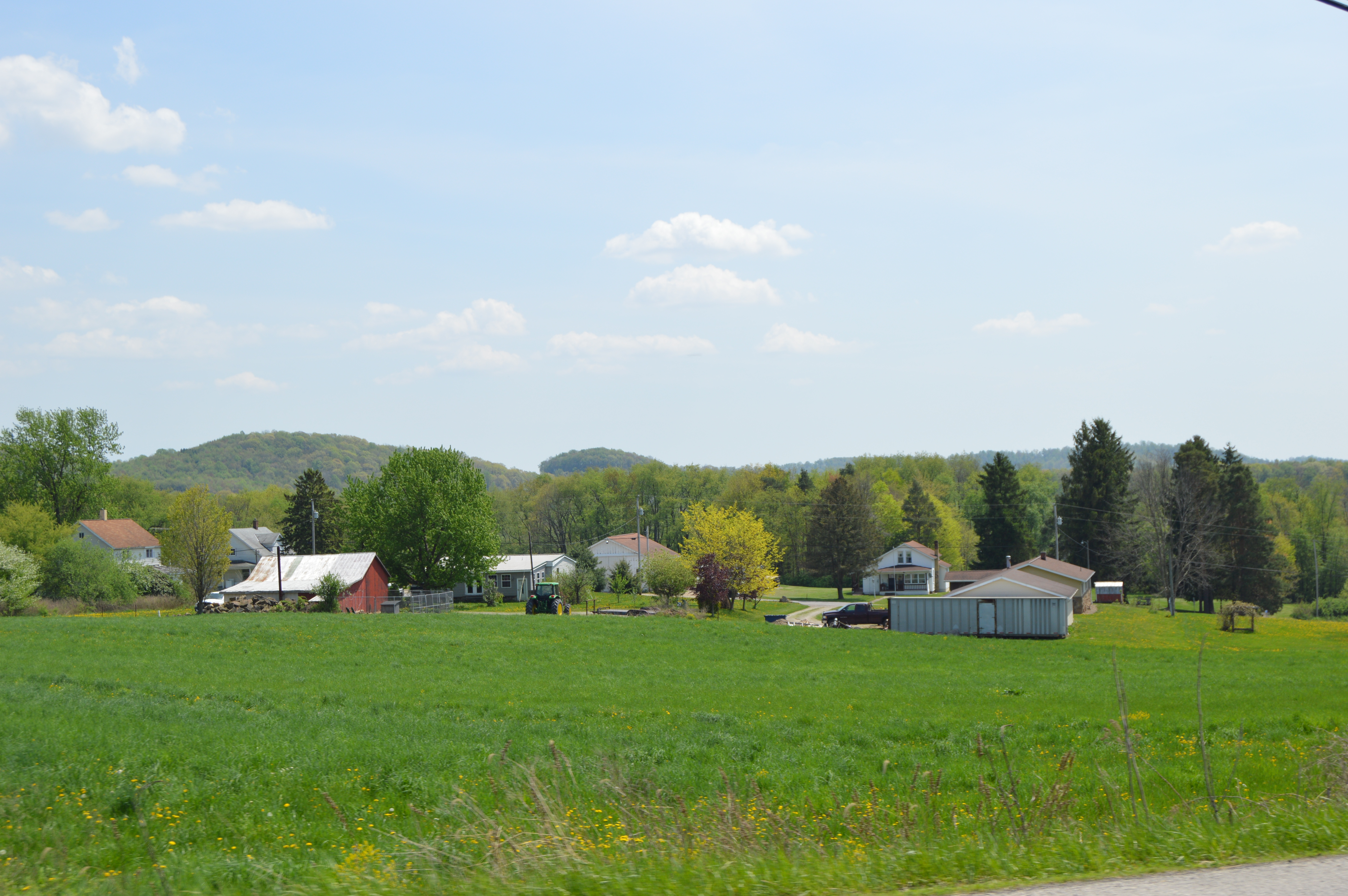
Overview of Georgeville

As of the census of 2000, there were 1,196 people, 423 households, and 326 families residing in the township. The population density was 38.1 inhabitants per square mile (14.7/km^{2}). There were 473 housing units at an average density of 15.1/sq mi (5.8/km^{2}). The racial makeup of the township was 98.24% White, 0.33% African American, 1.00% Asian, 0.25% from other races, and 0.17% from two or more races.

There were 423 households, out of which 39.0% had children under the age of 18 living with them, 63.4% were married couples living together, 9.7% had a female householder with no husband present, and 22.7% were non-families. 20.3% of all households were made up of individuals, and 9.0% had someone living alone who was 65 years of age or older. The average household size was 2.83 and the average family size was 3.28.

In the township the population was spread out, with 29.2% under the age of 18, 10.0% from 18 to 24, 28.0% from 25 to 44, 21.9% from 45 to 64, and 10.9% who were 65 years of age or older. The median age was 35 years. For every 100 females there were 92.3 males. For every 100 females age 18 and over, there were 91.2 males.

The median income for a household in the township was $28,700, and the median income for a family was $33,523. Males had a median income of $28,906 versus $20,795 for females. The per capita income for the township was $13,168. About 16.5% of families and 19.3% of the population were below the poverty line, including 26.8% of those under age 18 and 4.7% of those age 65 or over.
