= Dixonville, Pennsylvania =

Unincorporated community in Pennsylvania, US

Dixonville, Pennsylvania Dicksonville
- Census-designated place
- Location within Pennsylvania Location within the United States
- Coordinates: 40°42′58″N 79°0′26″W
- Country: United States
- State: Pennsylvania
- County: Indiana
- Townships: Green, Rayne

Area
  - Total: 0.91 sq mi (2.35 km^{2})
  - Land: 0.90 sq mi (2.34 km^{2})
  - Water: 0.0039 sq mi (0.01 km^{2})
- Elevation: 1,280 ft (390 m)

Population (2020)
  - Total: 413
  - Density: 457.8/sq mi (176.75/km^{2})
- Time zone: UTC-5 (Eastern (EST))
  - Summer (DST): UTC-4 (EDT)
- ZIP code: 15734
- FIPS code: 42-19161
- GNIS feature ID: 1173320

Dixonville is an unincorporated community in Indiana County, Pennsylvania, United States. The area is recorded as the "Dicksonville" census-designated place (CDP), with a population of 467 at the 2010 census. The CDP lies mostly on the western edge of Green Township, though a small portion extends west into Rayne Township.

== Geography ==
Dixonville is located in north-central Indiana County in the valley of Dixon Run, a south-flowing tributary of Two Lick Creek.

According to the United States Census Bureau, the CDP has a total area of 0.9 square miles (2.3 km^{2}), all land.

== Geology ==
The Pennsylvanian Allegheny Formation underlies most of the town of Dixonville. The hills to the east and west are underlain by the Glenshaw Formation. The axis of the Dixonville syncline trends northeast and passes north of the town. To the west of the town are kimberlite dikes of Jurassic age.

The kimberlite dikes are known as the Dixonville-Tanoma dikes, and were discovered in the Barr Slope coal mine and in the Tanoma coal mine, which mined the Lower Freeport Coal bed of the upper Allegheny Formation. The dikes are not exposed at the surface.

== Demographics ==
Historical population
Census	Pop.	Note	%±
2020	413		—
U.S. Decennial Census

As of the census of 2000, there were 450 people, 176 households, and 124 families residing in the CDP. The population density was 509.4 inhabitants per square mile (196.7/km^{2}). There were 195 housing units at an average density of 220.7 per square mile (85.2/km^{2}). The racial makeup of the CDP was 99.11% White, and 0.89% from two or more races. Hispanic or Latino of any race were 1.33% of the population.

There were 176 households, out of which 35.2% had children under the age of 18 living with them, 53.4% were married couples living together, 11.4% had a female householder with no husband present, and 29.5% were non-families. 25.0% of all households were made up of individuals, and 13.6% had someone living alone who was 65 years of age or older. The average household size was 2.56 and the average family size was 3.09.

In the CDP, the population was spread out, with 25.6% under the age of 18, 7.3% from 18 to 24, 32.0% from 25 to 44, 19.6% from 45 to 64, and 15.6% who were 65 years of age or older. The median age was 37 years. For every 100 females, there were 92.3 males. For every 100 females age 18 and over, there were 95.9 males.

The median income for a household in the town was $32,961, and the median income for a family was $36,827. Males had a median income of $27,969 versus $17,632 for females. The per capita income for the CDP was $14,785. None of the families and 3.1% of the population were living below the poverty line, including no under eighteens and 6.7% of those over 64.

== Hate group ==
Dixonville is home to the headquarters of the Militant Knights Ku Klux Klan.
