= Nolo, Pennsylvania =

Unincorporated community in Pennsylvania, U.S.

Coordinates: 40.572763°N 78.959559°W

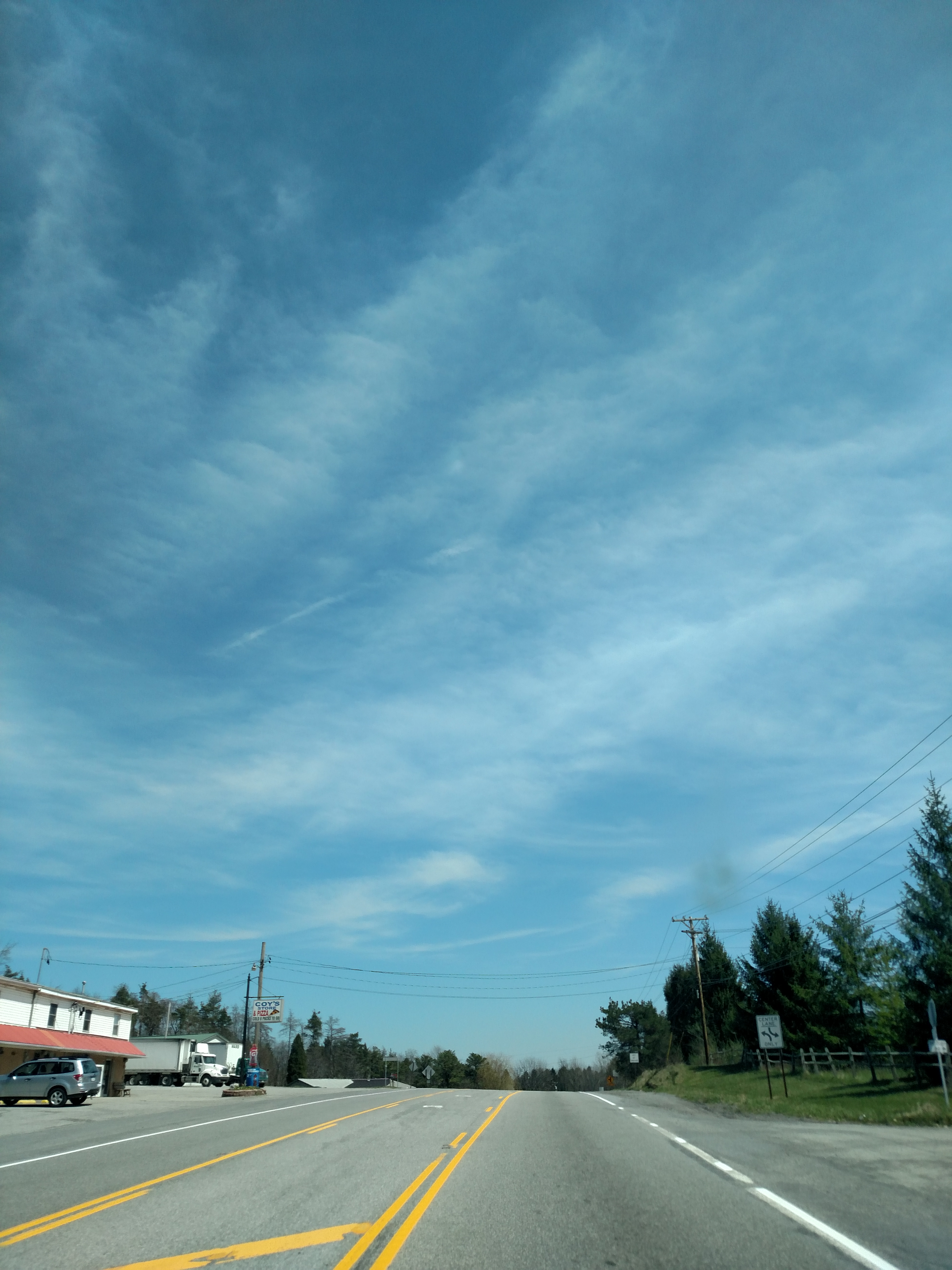
US 422 eastbound in Nolo

Nolo is an unincorporated community in Indiana County, in the U.S. state of Pennsylvania.

== History ==
A post office called Nolo was established in 1863, and remained in operation until it was discontinued in 1923. According to tradition, the community was named for the fact there was "no low ground" near the elevated town site.
