= Clymer, Pennsylvania =

Borough in Pennsylvania, US

- Borough
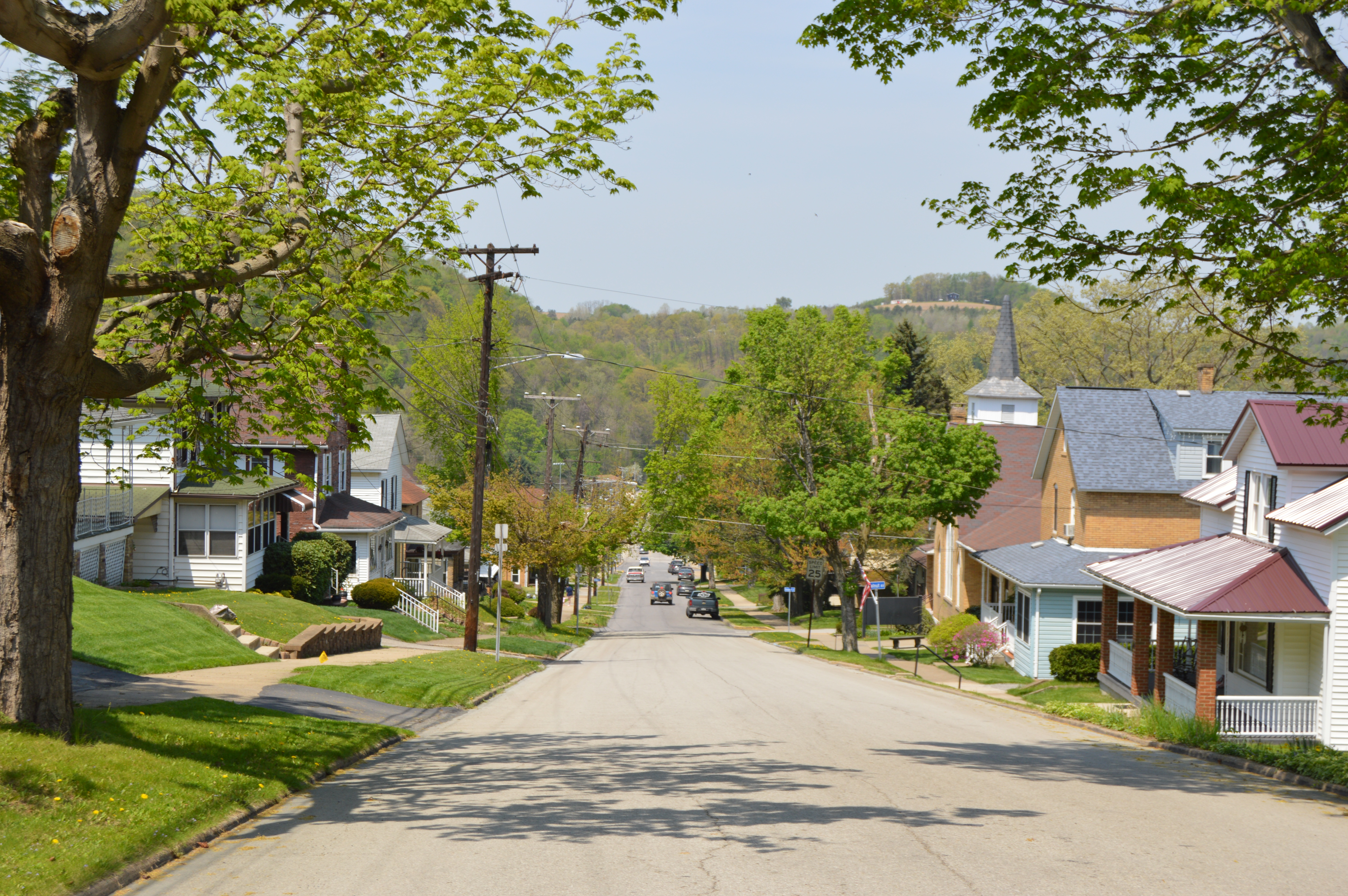
- Sixth Street, looking northwest from Wolcott Street

- Location of Clymer in Indiana County, Pennsylvania.

- Location within Pennsylvania Location within the United States
- Coordinates: 40°40′08″N 79°00′43″W
- Country: United States
- State: Pennsylvania
- County: Indiana
- Settled: 1905
- Incorporated: 1908

Government
  - Type: Borough Council
  - Mayor: James Patterson

Area
  - Total: 0.59 sq mi (1.52 km^{2})
  - Land: 0.57 sq mi (1.47 km^{2})
  - Water: 0.019 sq mi (0.05 km^{2})

Population (2020)
  - Total: 1,321
  - Density: 2,320.6/sq mi (895.97/km^{2})
- Time zone: UTC-5 (Eastern (EST))
  - Summer (DST): UTC-4 (EDT)
- Zip code: 15728
- Area code: 724
- FIPS code: 42-14520
- Website: https://clymerborough.com/

Clymer is a borough in Indiana County, Pennsylvania, United States. The population was 1,336 at the 2020 census. The community was named after William Bingham Clymer, grandson of George Clymer, one of the signers of the United States Declaration of Independence. William Clymer sold the land the borough is situated on to Thomas White (Namesake of White Township) in the 1830s. Most of Clymer's family died in a tragic sea accident in 1878, which made national news and inspired the name. It is surrounded by but separate from Cherryhill Township.

== Geography ==
According to the United States Census Bureau, the borough has a total area of 0.6 square miles (1.6 km^{2}), all land.

== History ==
On 26 August 1926, forty-four people were killed in a coal mine explosion in Clymer.

= Flag =

== Flag ==
On October 14, 2026, the Clymer Borough Council officially adopted the town's first municipal flag. The flag was designed by Ryker Shirley, an 11-year-old local resident who presented two layout options to the council out of community spirit. Following a public, town-wide vote in late September 2026, Shirley's winning design was formally chosen by the community.

The flag's design heavily incorporates symbols of Clymer's founding as a coal mining hub. It features a green hill and trees with minecarts entering a coal mine at the base. At the peak of the hill sit two crossed pickaxes, beneath a star decorated with a red, white, and black brick pattern bearing the text "Clymer 1905". The flag also includes a map of Pennsylvania with a star marking the borough's exact geographic location.

== Demographics ==
Historical population
Census	Pop.	Note	%±
1910	1,753		—
1920	2,867		63.5%
1930	2,672		−6.8%
1940	3,062		14.6%
1950	2,500		−18.4%
1960	2,251		−10.0%
1970	2,054		−8.8%
1980	1,761		−14.3%
1990	1,499		−14.9%
2000	1,547		3.2%
2010	1,357		−12.3%
2020	1,321		−2.7%
2021 (est.)	1,330	▲	0.7%

At the 2000 census there were 1,547 people in 679 households, including 418 families, in the borough. The population density was 2,606.6 inhabitants per square mile (1,006.4/km^{2}). There were 734 housing units at an average density of 1,236.8 per square mile (477.5/km^{2}). The racial makeup of the borough was 99.55% White, 0.19% Native American, 0.06% Asian, 0.06% from other races, and 0.13% from two or more races. Hispanic or Latino of any race were 0.19%.

There were 679 households, 27.0% had children under the age of 18 living with them, 44.9% were married couples living together, 12.5% had a female householder with no husband present, and 38.3% were non-families. 35.1% of households were made up of individuals, and 21.6% were one person aged 65 or older. The average household size was 2.28 and the average family size was 2.97.

The age distribution was 22.9% under the age of 18, 7.4% from 18 to 24, 27.1% from 25 to 44, 21.6% from 45 to 64, and 20.9% 65 or older. The median age was 39 years. For every 100 females there were 81.6 males. For every 100 females age 18 and over, there were 76.3 males.

The median household income was $24,688 and the median family income was $36,688. Males had a median income of $29,375 versus $25,000 for females. The per capita income for the borough was $14,250. About 14.5% of families and 16.5% of the population were below the poverty line, including 21.6% of those under age 18 and 15.9% of those age 65 or over.

== Education ==
It is in the Penns Manor Area School District.

== Controversies ==
Clymer has faced a new wave of recent criticism after the issued 75 fee in Clymer, Pennsylvania. the annual household emergency medical services fee implemented by the Indiana County Municipal Emergency Services Authority (ICMESA). This mandatory municipal fee applies to property owners to ensure 24/7 emergency ambulance readiness and operations across participating districts, including Clymer Borough.
