= Pine Township, Indiana County, Pennsylvania =

Township in Pennsylvania, US

- Township
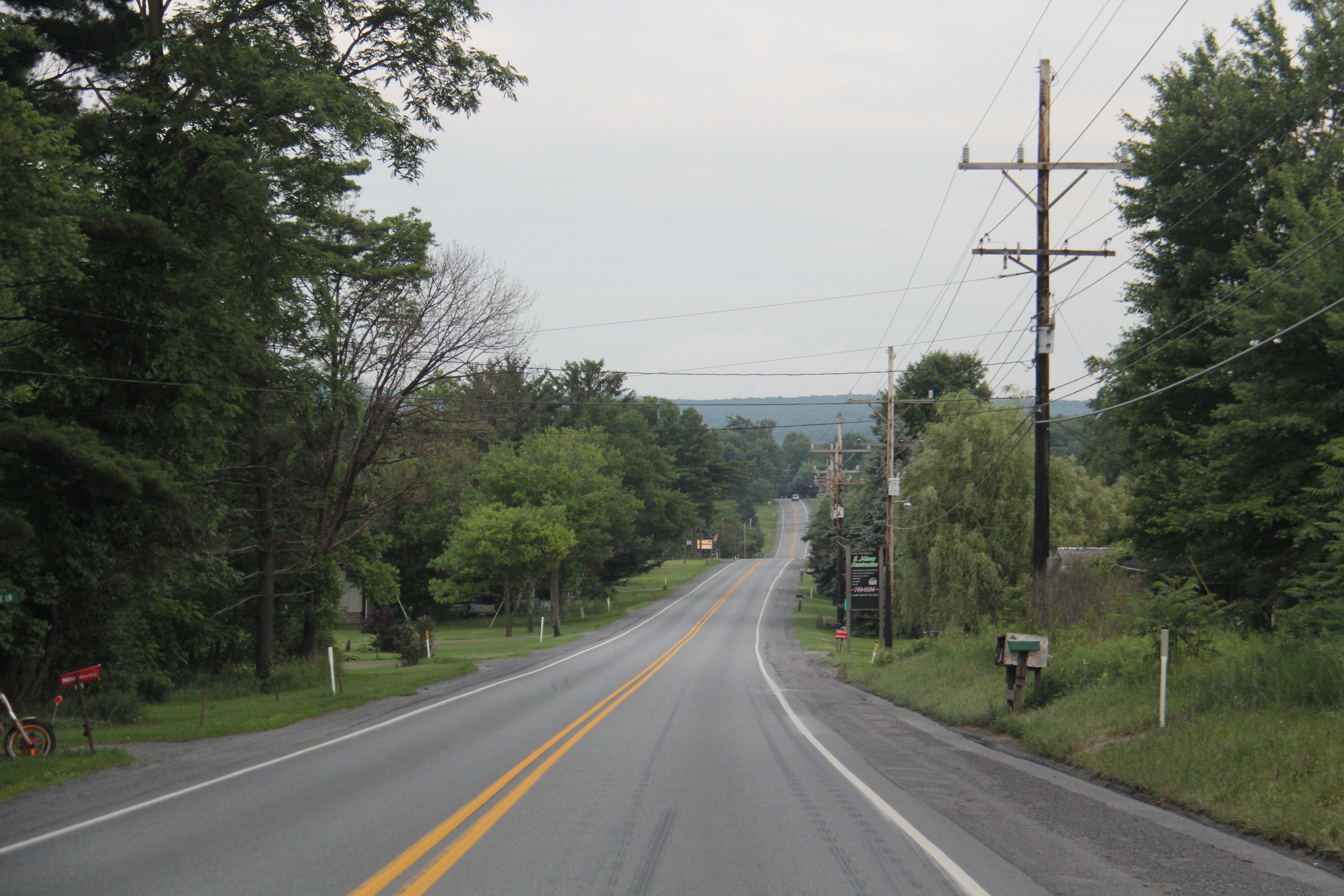
- Eastbound US 422 in Pine Township

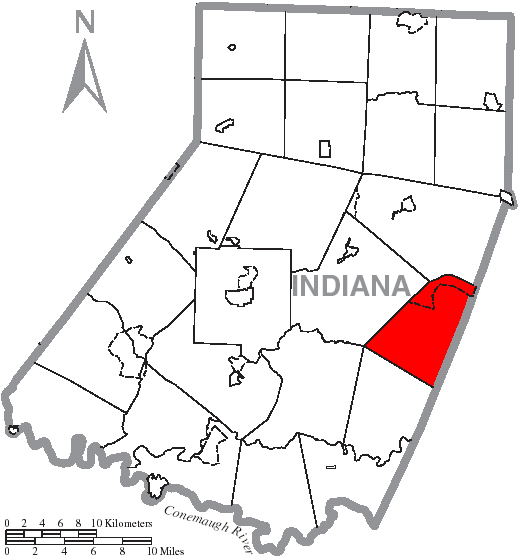
- Map of Indiana County, Pennsylvania Highlighting Pine Township

- Map of Pennsylvania highlighting Indiana County
- Country: United States
- State: Pennsylvania
- County: Indiana

Area
  - Total: 31.05 sq mi (80.43 km^{2})
  - Land: 31.03 sq mi (80.37 km^{2})
  - Water: 0.023 sq mi (0.06 km^{2})

Population (2020)
  - Total: 1,881 ▼
  - Estimate (2021): 1,931
  - Density: 62.2/sq mi (24.03/km^{2})
- Time zone: UTC-5 (Eastern (EST))
  - Summer (DST): UTC-4 (EDT)
- FIPS code: 42-063-60320
- Website: http://www.pinetownshipindianacounty.com/

Pine Township is a township that is located in Indiana County, Pennsylvania, United States. The population was 1,881 at the time of the 2020 census.

The township includes the communities of Alverda, Heilwood, Mentcle (previously Penn Mary), Nolo, Pineton, and Strongstown.

== History ==
The land that would eventually become Pine Township was settled circa 1823. It was separated from Wheatfield Township during the 1850s and subsequently incorporated.

In 1827, St. Patrick's Church was built in Pine Township, becoming the oldest Catholic Church in Indiana County.

== Geography ==
According to the United States Census Bureau, the township has a total area of 31.0 square miles (80.4 km^{2}), all land.

== Demographics ==
Historical population
| Census | Pop. | Note | %± |
|---|---|---|---|
| 1850 | 1,367 | | — |
| 1860 | 1,788 | | 30.8% |
| 1870 | 921 | | −48.5% |
| 1880 | 1,189 | | 29.1% |
| 1890 | 1,005 | | −15.5% |
| 1900 | 911 | | −9.4% |
| 1910 | 2,563 | | 181.3% |
| 1920 | 3,278 | | 27.9% |
| 1930 | 2,613 | | −20.3% |
| 1940 | 2,864 | | 9.6% |
| 1950 | 2,576 | | −10.1% |
| 1960 | 2,145 | | −16.7% |
| 1970 | 1,984 | | −7.5% |
| 1980 | 2,152 | | 8.5% |
| 1990 | 2,172 | | 0.9% |
| 2000 | 2,140 | | −1.5% |
| 2010 | 2,033 | | −5.0% |
| 2020 | 1,881 | | −7.5% |
| 2021 (est.) | 1,874 | | −0.4% |
U.S. Decennial Census

As of the census of 2000, there were 2,140 people, 815 households, and 621 families residing in the township. The population density was 69.0 inhabitants per square mile (26.6/km^{2}). There were 894 housing units at an average density of 28.8 per square mile (11.1/km^{2}). The racial makeup of the township was 99.16% White, 0.09% African American, 0.09% Native American, and 0.65% from two or more races. Hispanic or Latino of any race were 0.23% of the population.

There were 815 households, out of which 33.6% had children under the age of 18 living with them, 61.7% were married couples living together, 9.8% had a female householder with no husband present, and 23.8% were non-families. 21.0% of all households were made up of individuals, and 11.3% had someone living alone who was 65 years of age or older. The average household size was 2.63 and the average family size was 3.05.

In the township the population was spread out, with 24.9% under the age of 18, 8.9% from 18 to 24, 28.5% from 25 to 44, 23.5% from 45 to 64, and 14.3% who were 65 years of age or older. The median age was 38 years. For every 100 females, there were 97.1 males. For every 100 females age 18 and over, there were 93.7 males.

The median income for a household in the township was $29,898, and the median income for a family was $33,781. Males had a median income of $29,708 versus $20,481 for females. The per capita income for the township was $12,404. About 11.7% of families and 17.7% of the population were below the poverty line, including 24.2% of those under age 18 and 10.8% of those age 65 or over.

== Communities ==
=== Census-designated places ===
Census-designated places are geographical areas designated by the U.S. Census Bureau for the purposes of compiling demographic data. They are not actual jurisdictions under Pennsylvania law. Other unincorporated communities, such as villages, may be listed here as well.

- Heilwood

=== Unincorporated communities ===
- Alverda
- Grismore (partly in Green Township)
- Jewtown
- Mentcle
- Nolo
- Pineton
- Rinker Crossing
- Strongstown

== Government ==
Township Supervisors.

- Ryan Shultz, Chairman of the Board, Road Master
- Keith Muir, Supervisor, Democrat
- Chris Cameron, Vice Chairman
- Jennifer Lindahl, Secretary/Treasurer
- David Serene, Township Solicitor
- William Cochran, Emergency Management
