= Heilwood, Pennsylvania =

Unincorporated community in Pennsylvania, US

- Census-designated place
- Location within Pennsylvania Location within the United States
- Coordinates: 40°38′14″N 78°52′57″W
- Country: United States
- State: Pennsylvania
- County: Indiana
- Township: Pine

Area
  - Total: 1.25 sq mi (3.25 km^{2})
  - Land: 1.25 sq mi (3.25 km^{2})
  - Water: 0 sq mi (0.00 km^{2})

Population (2020)
  - Total: 318
  - Density: 253.3/sq mi (97.81/km^{2})
- Time zone: UTC-5 (Eastern (EST))
  - Summer (DST): UTC-4 (EDT)
- FIPS code: 42-33672

Heilwood is a census-designated place (CDP) in Indiana County, Pennsylvania, United States. The population was 711 at the time of the 2010 census.

== History ==
=== Early history and development ===
In 1850, a portion of Wheatfield Township (located in Indiana County, Pennsylvania) was sectioned off to create Pine Township, named for its extensive pine forests. Here, J. M. Guthrie established a logging settlement consisting of five frame houses, a store room, stables, a blacksmith shop, and several other outbuildings in the 1880s. Over time, the area came to be known as Possum Glory—Edward R. Sutton, an employee of Guthrie's, is credited with coining the name due to the preponderance of possums in the area.

By 1894, the lumber business had diminished significantly; Guthrie was facing difficult financial times and his lands were sold at a sheriff's sale in June 1896 to J. M. Stewart of Indiana, Pennsylvania. The area was underlaid with coal and four years later Stewart would sell to Philadelphia industrialist John Heisley Weaver, founder of J. H. Weaver & Company, Handlers of Coal and Coke. Weaver accumulated considerable holdings in Pine, Green, and Cherryhill Townships and by 1904 was ready to begin building a “model town” to support his expanding mining operations nearby, which he named “Heilwood,” and was probably a combination of his nickname (“Heil”) and the name of his first coal mine in Kingwood (Preston County), West Virginia (“Heisleywood”).

This concept involved building, from the ground up, a fully-functioning modern town with amenities typical for the time, such as a school, church, boarding house, company store, policing, hotel, and a hospital. Designed to directly support mining, it would only operate as long as the mine remained viable. In theory, the company provided construction capital and filled some roles of a local government, such as maintaining public spaces and paying the salary of certain school officials, while workers and their families rented housing on a monthly basis. In practice, this meant employees found many aspects of their lives dictated by company policy, enjoyed limited freedom of movement, and did not have equitable access to housing—typical immigrant families would be provided only with a small, uninsulated shanty, and after the death or unemployment of a miner his family had as few as five days to vacate their home. Still, life in a model town with these conveniences, guaranteed work, and a stable community were preferable to the lives many left behind and by 1905, 494 men were employed across five mine complexes, producing approximately 100,000 tons of coal annually.

The Penn Mary Coal Company (a subsidiary of the Pennsylvania and Maryland Steel Companies) purchased John H. Weaver's western Pennsylvania holdings for $1.8 million in 1906. Following the purchase, the Penn Mary Coal Company appointed Harry P. Dowler to replace James Starford as General Superintendent. The Indiana Evening Gazette reported that the newly appointed Dowler would receive a “snug salary” of $6,000 a year, plus rent—in stark contrast to the shanty town skirting Heilwood, he resided in a stately Greek-revival mansion on a leafy avenue reserved for supervisory personnel and featuring luxuries such as indoor plumbing. Dowler aggressively expanded operations, and over the next four years opened four new mines and introduced innovative new processes, such as the use of an incline plane at mines #5 and #7, first aid training, and emergency response teams. Additionally, he would achieve Heilwood's peak production in 1909 of 888,058 tons, and employed 900 men by 1911. He also continued expanding the town, overseeing construction of a new school, company offices, the Catholic church, additional housing for the miners, and homes for supervisory personnel. By 1913, Heilwood was largely complete, although an additional school and gymnasium were constructed later.

=== Leadership changes ===
In August 1914, the Penn Mary Coal Company was purchased by the Cambria Steel Company of Johnstown (formerly the Cambria Iron Works). All upper management personnel were replaced, and H. J. Meehan was named the General Superintendent. Cambria Steel maintained ownership of the Heilwood complex until 1916, when the Bethlehem Steel Company of Johnstown took over. Following the takeover, Thomas Richards Johns, the highly successful former general manager of the Ebensburg Coal Company, became Superintendent. Over the next several years, Bethlehem Steel Company invested over $500,000 in improvements to the Heilwood mining complex and opened mines #9 and #11, which would operate until 1946 and 1959 respectively. Despite the numerous changes in ownership, the coal mines in and around Heilwood retained the Penn Mary name until 1921, when all of the mines became known as Bethlehem Mines. Heilwood's first and only miner's union was chartered in 1936 under Bethlehem and made possible as a result of strong pro-labor laws during the Great Depression; previously, harsh anti-union tactics and paying above market rates for labor had previously succeeded in preventing unionization and avoided major strikes.

In 1936, the Bethlehem Mines Corporation was dissolved and replaced by a new company, the Industrial Collieries Corporation. Industrial Collieries managed the mines until 1940, when the operation was leased to the Redlands Coal Company, a subsidiary of J. H. Weaver Company of Philadelphia – the very group that had opened the first Heilwood mines in 1904. This lease arrangement continued until 1943, at which point the Redlands Coal Company purchased the mines from Bethlehem Steel. It was during this time the Monroe Coal Company (another subsidiary of the J. H. Weaver Company) acting as a real estate agency, began selling the houses and lots to the residents of Heilwood as mining was no longer profitable enough to justify the expense of running a private town.

=== Sale and closure of mines ===
The Redlands Coal Company continued to run the mines until 1948, when they sold them back to Bethlehem Steel, which operated them for another year before selling them to the Pine Township Coal Company. The Pine Township Coal Company continued to operate until 1959, when the final remaining mine, #11, was exhausted and closed for good.

Following the closure of mine #11 and without any other significant industry, Heilwood became less viable as a large, independent town and most residents moved to neighboring cities. The history of the people who lived and worked in the area is preserved in the Pennsylvania State University's T. R. Johns Collection, and at the Indiana County Historical Society and the Indiana University of Pennsylvania.

== Geography ==
Heilwood is located at 40°38′14″N 78°52′57″W (40.637259, -78.882627).

According to the United States Census Bureau, the CDP has a total area of 3.8 square miles (9.8 km^{2}), all land.

== Demographics ==
Historical population
Census	Pop.	Note	%±
2020	318		—
U.S. Decennial Census

At the 2000 census there were 786 people, 304 households, and 221 families in the CDP. The population density was 204.0 inhabitants per square mile (78.8/km^{2}). There were 326 housing units at an average density of 84.6 per square mile (32.7/km^{2}). The racial makeup of the CDP was 99.49% White, 0.25% African American, 0.13% Native American, and 0.13% from two or more races. Hispanic or Latino of any race were 0.13%.

There were 304 households, 32.9% had children under the age of 18 living with them, 56.3% were married couples living together, 11.8% had a female householder with no husband present, and 27.0% were non-families. 26.0% of households were made up of individuals, and 16.1% were one person aged 65 or older. The average household size was 2.59 and the average family size was 3.09.

The age distribution was 24.8% under the age of 18, 9.2% from 18 to 24, 26.1% from 25 to 44, 21.9% from 45 to 64, and 18.1% 65 or older. The median age was 39 years. For every 100 females, there were 91.7 males. For every 100 females age 18 and over, there were 88.8 males.

The median household income was $29,722 and the median family income was $35,000. Males had a median income of $28,819 versus $21,591 for females. The per capita income for the CDP was $12,487. About 13.3% of families and 17.0% of the population were below the poverty line, including 29.2% of those under age 18 and 7.7% of those age 65 or over.

== Notable person ==
- Augie Donatelli, MLB umpire
