= Indiana County, Pennsylvania =

County in Pennsylvania, United States

- County
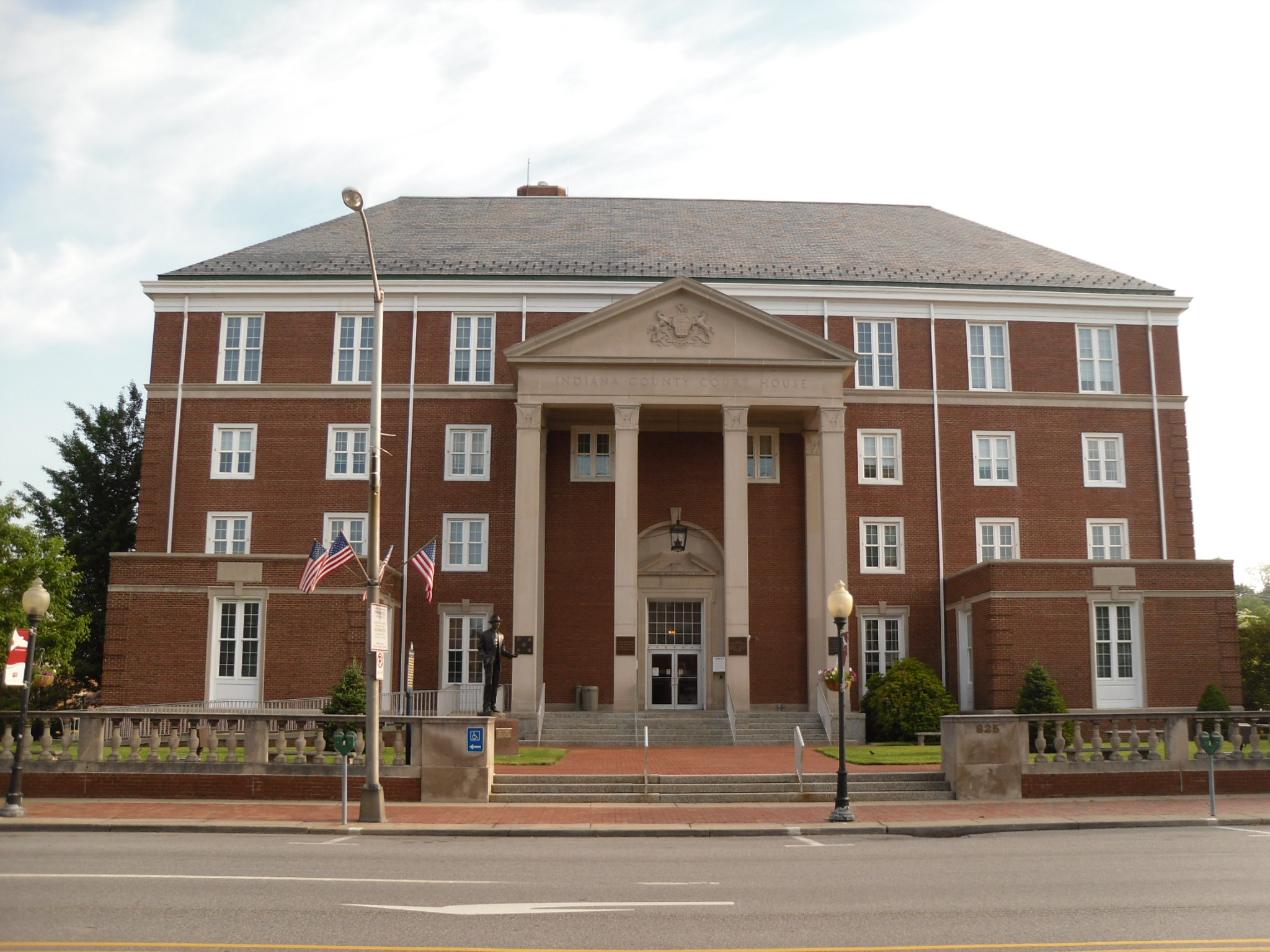
- Indiana County Courthouse

- Seal

- Location within the U.S. state of Pennsylvania
- Coordinates: 40°39′N 79°05′W
- Country: United States
- State: Pennsylvania
- Founded: November 3, 1806
- Seat: Indiana
- Largest borough: Indiana

Area
  - Total: 834 sq mi (2,160 km^{2})
  - Land: 827 sq mi (2,140 km^{2})
  - Water: 7.3 sq mi (19 km^{2}) 0.9%

Population (2020)
  - Total: 83,246
  - Estimate (2025): 82,878 ▼
  - Density: 100/sq mi (39/km^{2})
- Time zone: UTC−5 (Eastern)
  - Summer (DST): UTC−4 (EDT)
- Congressional districts: 14th, 15th
- Website: www.indianacountypa.gov

Indiana County is a county in the Commonwealth of Pennsylvania. It is located in the west central part of Pennsylvania. As of the 2020 census, the population was 83,246. Its county seat is Indiana. Indiana County comprises the Indiana, PA Micropolitan Statistical Area, which is also included in the Pittsburgh-New Castle-Weirton, PA-WV-OH Combined Statistical Area. The county is part of the Southwest region of the commonwealth. (Note: Includes Westmoreland, Cambria, Fayette, Blair, Indiana, Somerset, Bedford, Huntingdon, Greene and Fulton Counties)

Prior to the Revolutionary War, some settlers proposed this as part of a larger, separate colony to be known as Vandalia, but opposing interests and the war intervened. Afterward, claims to the territory by both the states of Virginia and Pennsylvania had to be reconciled. After this land was assigned to Pennsylvania by the federal government according to the placement of the Mason–Dixon line, Indiana County was created on March 30, 1803, from parts of Westmoreland and Clearfield counties and was formally organized in 1806.

== History ==
Indiana County (Indiana meaning "land of the Indians") derives its name from the so-called "Indiana Grant of 1768" that the Iroquois Six Nations were forced to make to "suffering traders" under the Fort Stanwix Treaty of 1768. The Iroquois had controlled much of the Ohio River valley as their hunting grounds since the 17th century, and Anglo-American colonists were moving into the area and wanted to develop it. Traders arranged to force the Iroquois to grant land under the treaty in relations to losses due to Pontiac's Rebellion.

Some of the grantees joined forces with the Ohio Company, forming a larger development company based on enlarging their grant of land. They proposed that the entire large area would become a new British colony, possibly to be called Pittsylvania or Vandalia. It was to be bordered on the north and west by the Ohio River, and made up of what are now parts of eastern Kentucky, northern West Virginia (then part of the Virginia Colony), and western Pennsylvania. Anglo-European colonists from Virginia and Pennsylvania had already started to move into the area, which was identified by these various names as Indiana and the other above names on some maps of the late 1700s.

Opposition from other interest groups and the American Revolutionary War intervened before Britain approved such a colony. Afterward, some United States speculators proposed setting up a state in this area to be called Vandalia, or Westsylvania, as appears on some maps of the period.

But both the states of Virginia and Pennsylvania claimed the land based on their colonial charters. In establishing the Mason–Dixon line, the federal government assigned the Indiana Grant to Pennsylvania. As population increased after the war, this county was made up in 1803 of territory from Westmoreland and Clearfield counties; it was formally organized in 1806.

Kentucky and West Virginia continued to be associated with Virginia for some time, being separately admitted as states in the early 19th century and during the American Civil War, respectively. The area in Pennsylvania was unrelated to and was physically separated from the later named Indiana Territory established north of the Ohio River in 1800 by the new United States; that territory was eventually admitted to the Union as the State of Indiana.

Indiana County was known as a "hotbed of abolition", and was home to at least two African Methodist Episcopal Zion churches as well as other anti-slavery Protestants such as Wesleyan Methodists and Baptists. It was also in Indiana, local abolitionist leader James Moorhead published several anti-slavery newspapers. The first of these was The Clarion of Freedom, founded in 1843. Moorhead eventually sold the Clarion and founded a new anti-slavery paper, the Indiana Independent, which he published until his death in 1857. The Independent was published by his son J. W. Moorhead after his death. Blairsville was home to another abolitionist newspaper, The Appalachian, which was pro-Free Soil from 1848. Some of the nearby anti-slavery families like the Mitchells and Van Leers, became conductors or contributors in 1958. In a letter to abolitionist Theodore Parker, a local geologist Peter Lesley stated there we over 3,000 men helping the railroad in the area.

Indiana County was an active hub of the Underground Railroad. At least 90 county residents are known to have been conductors or agents, guiding fugitive slaves between hiding places on their way to freedom in Canada.

In the 21st century, Indiana County comprises the Indiana, PA Micropolitan Statistical Area. This is included in the Pittsburgh-New Castle-Weirton, PA-WV-OH Combined Statistical Area. It is in the defined region of the Pittsburgh media market. Indiana County is served by three different area codes: 724, 814, and 582.

The county proclaims itself the "Christmas Tree Capital of the World", shipping over one million trees annually. Agriculture is a major part of its economy.

== Geography ==
According to the U.S. Census Bureau, the county has a total area of 834 square miles (2,160 km^{2}), of which 827 square miles (2,140 km^{2}) is land and 7.3 square miles (19 km^{2}) (0.9%) is water. Located in the county is the Buttermilk Falls Natural Area. The county has a humid continental climate (Dfb), except along the Conemaugh, from below Strangford and the Kiskiminetas River, where it is (Dfa). Average monthly temperatures in the borough of Indiana range from 27.2 °F in January to 70.9 °F in July. Indiana County is one of the 423 counties served by the Appalachian Regional Commission, and it is identified as part of the "Midlands" by Colin Woodard in his book American Nations: A History of the Eleven Rival Regional Cultures of North America.

=== Adjacent counties ===
- Jefferson County (north)
- Clearfield County (northeast)
- Cambria County (southeast)
- Westmoreland County (south)
- Armstrong County (west)

=== Highways ===
- US 22
- US 119
- US 219
- US 422
- US 422 Bus.
- PA 36
- PA 56
- PA 85
- PA 110
- PA 156
- PA 210
- PA 217
- PA 240
- PA 259
- PA 286
- PA 403
- PA 553
- PA 580
- PA 711
- PA 954

== Demographics ==
Historical population
Census	Pop.	Note	%±
1810	6,214		—
1820	8,882		42.9%
1830	14,252		60.5%
1840	20,782		45.8%
1850	27,170		30.7%
1860	33,687		24.0%
1870	36,138		7.3%
1880	40,527		12.1%
1890	42,175		4.1%
1900	42,556		0.9%
1910	66,210		55.6%
1920	80,910		22.2%
1930	75,395		−6.8%
1940	79,854		5.9%
1950	77,106		−3.4%
1960	75,366		−2.3%
1970	79,451		5.4%
1980	92,281		16.1%
1990	89,994		−2.5%
2000	89,605		−0.4%
2010	88,880		−0.8%
2020	83,246		−6.3%
2025 (est.)	82,878	▼	−0.4%

=== 2020 census ===
As of the 2020 census, the county had a population of 83,246. The median age was 41.5 years. 18.6% of residents were under the age of 18 and 20.7% of residents were 65 years of age or older. For every 100 females there were 98.6 males, and for every 100 females age 18 and over there were 96.9 males age 18 and over.

As of the 2020 census, the racial makeup of the county was 91.6% White, 3.0% Black or African American, 0.2% American Indian and Alaska Native, 1.0% Asian, <0.1% Native Hawaiian and Pacific Islander, 0.6% from some other race, and 3.6% from two or more races. Hispanic or Latino residents of any race comprised 1.8% of the population.

Indiana County, Pennsylvania – Racial and ethnic composition Note: the US Census treats Hispanic/Latino as an ethnic category. This table excludes Latinos from the racial categories and assigns them to a separate category. Hispanics/Latinos may be of any race.
Race / Ethnicity (NH = Non-Hispanic)	Pop 2000	Pop 2010	Pop 2020	% 2000	% 2010	% 2020
White alone (NH)	86,493	83,864	75,718	96.52%	94.35%	90.95%
Black or African American alone (NH)	1,391	2,374	2,409	1.55%	2.67%	2.89%
Native American or Alaska Native alone (NH)	62	103	116	0.06%	0.11%	0.13%
Asian alone (NH)	662	768	816	0.73%	0.86%	0.98%
Pacific Islander alone (NH)	7	9	7	0.00%	0.01%	0.00%
Other race alone (NH)	52	51	148	0.05%	0.05%	0.17%
Mixed race or Multiracial (NH)	481	764	2,556	0.53%	0.85%	3.07%
Hispanic or Latino (any race)	457	947	1,476	0.51%	1.06%	1.77%
Total	89,605	88,880	83,246	100.00%	100.00%	100.00%

As of the 2020 census, 40.2% of residents lived in urban areas, while 59.8% lived in rural areas.

As of the 2020 census, there were 33,286 households in the county, of which 23.9% had children under the age of 18 living in them. Of all households, 47.8% were married-couple households, 20.1% were households with a male householder and no spouse or partner present, and 25.4% were households with a female householder and no spouse or partner present. About 30.3% of all households were made up of individuals and 13.3% had someone living alone who was 65 years of age or older.

As of the 2020 census, there were 37,626 housing units, of which 11.5% were vacant. Among occupied housing units, 69.1% were owner-occupied and 30.9% were renter-occupied. The homeowner vacancy rate was 1.9% and the rental vacancy rate was 12.1%.

=== 2000 census ===
As of the 2000 census of 2000, there were 89,605 people, 34,123 households, and 22,521 families residing in the county. The population density was 108 inhabitants per square mile (42/km^{2}). There were 37,250 housing units at an average density of 45 units per square mile (17/km^{2}). The racial makeup of the county was 96.87% White, 1.57% Black or African American, 0.08% Native American, 0.74% Asian, 0.01% Pacific Islander, 0.16% from other races, and 0.58% from two or more races. 0.51% of the population were Hispanic or Latino of any race. 25.9% were of German, 11.6% Italian, 10.7% Irish, 8.6% American, 7.1% English and 6.8% Polish ancestry.

There were 34,123 households, out of which 27.90% had children under the age of 18 living with them, 54.30% were married couples living together, 8.20% had a female householder with no husband present, and 34.00% were non-families. 26.50% of all households were made up of individuals, and 11.80% had someone living alone who was 65 years of age or older. The average household size was 2.47 and the average family size was 2.99.

In the county, the population was spread out, with 21.10% under the age of 18, 16.60% from 18 to 24, 24.80% from 25 to 44, 22.70% from 45 to 64, and 14.90% who were 65 years of age or older. The median age was 36 years. For every 100 females, there were 94.00 males. For every 100 females age 18 and over, there were 90.60 males.

== Micropolitan Statistical Area ==
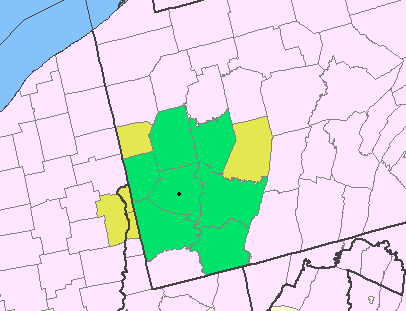
Map of the Pittsburgh-New Castle-Weirton, PA-OH-WV Combined Statistical Area (CSA)

The United States Office of Management and Budget has designated Indiana County as the Indiana, PA Micropolitan Statistical Area (μSA). As of the 2010 United States census the micropolitan area ranked 4th most populous in the State of Pennsylvania and the 50th most populous in the United States with a population of 88,880. Indiana County is also a part of the Pittsburgh-New Castle-Weirton, PA-OH-WV Combined Statistical Area (CSA), which combines the population of Indiana, as well as the Allegheny, Armstrong, Beaver, Butler, Fayette, Lawrence, Washington and Westmoreland county areas in Pennsylvania. In West Virginia the counties included are Brooke and Hancock. And in Ohio, Jefferson County. The Combined Statistical Area ranked 4th in the state of Pennsylvania and 20th most populous in the United States with a population of 2,660,727.

== Government and politics ==
Indiana County has been strongly Republican in presidential elections for most of its history, only backing Democratic party candidates four times in presidential elections from 1880 to the present day.

United States presidential election results for Indiana County, Pennsylvania
Year	Republican		Democratic		Third party(ies)	
Year	No.	%	No.	%	No.	%
1888	5,084	62.83%	2,231	27.57%	777	9.60%
1892	4,559	61.18%	2,134	28.64%	759	10.19%
1896	5,818	66.11%	2,752	31.27%	231	2.62%
1900	5,687	72.25%	1,767	22.45%	417	5.30%
1904	6,878	77.25%	1,558	17.50%	468	5.26%
1908	6,416	67.44%	1,965	20.65%	1,133	11.91%
1912	1,720	20.21%	1,593	18.72%	5,197	61.07%
1916	4,887	57.65%	2,398	28.29%	1,192	14.06%
1920	8,616	71.84%	1,936	16.14%	1,441	12.02%
1924	12,748	69.75%	2,067	11.31%	3,462	18.94%
1928	16,706	76.75%	4,810	22.10%	252	1.16%
1932	12,727	57.24%	8,606	38.70%	902	4.06%
1936	16,530	51.37%	15,353	47.71%	294	0.91%
1940	15,547	56.23%	12,035	43.53%	68	0.25%
1944	14,388	61.42%	8,863	37.83%	175	0.75%
1948	12,640	59.67%	8,543	40.33%	0	0.00%
1952	16,673	58.63%	11,620	40.86%	147	0.52%
1956	18,593	62.27%	11,268	37.73%	0	0.00%
1960	18,756	58.59%	13,174	41.15%	83	0.26%
1964	11,706	39.92%	17,568	59.92%	46	0.16%
1968	14,899	51.03%	12,175	41.70%	2,122	7.27%
1972	18,122	61.90%	10,833	37.01%	319	1.09%
1976	15,786	51.01%	14,650	47.34%	513	1.66%
1980	15,607	49.62%	13,828	43.97%	2,016	6.41%
1984	18,845	54.22%	15,791	45.43%	123	0.35%
1988	14,983	47.21%	16,514	52.03%	242	0.76%
1992	10,966	32.92%	15,194	45.61%	7,154	21.47%
1996	12,874	42.10%	13,868	45.35%	3,841	12.56%
2000	16,799	53.50%	13,667	43.52%	935	2.98%
2004	20,254	55.88%	15,831	43.67%	163	0.45%
2008	19,727	52.88%	17,065	45.75%	510	1.37%
2012	21,257	58.33%	14,473	39.71%	714	1.96%
2016	24,888	65.29%	11,528	30.24%	1,706	4.48%
2020	28,089	68.03%	12,634	30.60%	566	1.37%
2024	29,215	69.01%	12,697	29.99%	425	1.00%

United States Senate election results for Indiana County, Pennsylvania1
Year	Republican		Democratic		Third party(ies)	
Year	No.	%	No.	%	No.	%
1994	12,558	50.09%	11,497	45.86%	1,014	4.04%
2000	17,651	56.68%	12,761	40.98%	731	2.35%
2006	12,342	46.69%	14,091	53.31%	0	0.00%
2012	20,452	56.49%	14,908	41.18%	843	2.33%
2018	16,314	55.22%	12,702	42.99%	527	1.78%
2024	27,881	66.28%	13,181	31.33%	1,006	2.39%

United States Senate election results for Indiana County, Pennsylvania3
Year	Republican		Democratic		Third party(ies)	
Year	No.	%	No.	%	No.	%
1992	15,976	48.40%	14,998	45.43%	2,037	6.17%
1998	14,577	63.03%	7,856	33.97%	695	3.01%
2004	19,478	54.34%	12,515	34.91%	3,854	10.75%
2010	15,133	60.01%	10,085	39.99%	0	0.00%
2016	22,245	58.86%	12,592	33.32%	2,955	7.82%
2022	20,769	63.41%	11,218	34.25%	768	2.34%

Pennsylvania Gubernatorial election results for Indiana County
Year	Republican		Democratic		Third party(ies)	
Year	No.	%	No.	%	No.	%
1970	10,941	45.39%	12,598	52.27%	565	2.34%
1974	12,473	50.64%	11,990	48.68%	169	0.69%
1978	11,986	49.84%	11,911	49.53%	150	0.62%
1982	14,191	52.32%	12,761	47.05%	172	0.63%
1986	10,911	44.53%	13,369	54.57%	220	0.90%
1990	6,622	29.68%	15,692	70.32%	0	0.00%
1994	11,087	43.99%	10,368	41.13%	3,751	14.88%
1998	11,733	50.73%	6,910	29.88%	4,486	19.40%
2002	13,462	56.12%	9,897	41.26%	627	2.61%
2006	13,390	50.83%	12,953	49.17%	0	0.00%
2010	16,520	65.14%	8,842	34.86%	0	0.00%
2014	12,199	54.41%	10,223	45.59%	0	0.00%
2018	16,179	55.04%	12,715	43.25%	502	1.71%
2022	19,179	58.58%	13,032	39.80%	531	1.62%

As of February 5, 2024, there were 48,654 registered voters across Indiana County's 69 precincts: 27,290 Republicans (56.09%); 15,193 Democrats (31.23%), 4,334 Independents (8.91%) and 1,837 from other parties (3.77%).

Chart of Voter Registration
1. Republican (56.1%)
2. Democratic (31.2%)
3. Independent (8.91%)
4. Other Parties (3.77%)

=== County commissioners ===
- Michael Keith, chairman, Republican
- Bonni Dunlap, Republican
- Sherene Hess, Democratic

=== Other county offices ===
- Coroner, Jerry L Overman Jr, Republican
- District Attorney, Robert Manzi, Republican
- Prothonotary, Randy Degenkolb, Republican
- Recorder of Deeds and Register of Wills, Maria Jack, Republican
- Sheriff, Robert Fyock, Republican
- Treasurer, Kimberly McCullough, Republican
- Board of Auditors, Eric Miller, Republican; Kelly Pidgeon, Republican; Barbara Barker, Democratic

=== State representatives ===
- James Struzzi, Republican, 62nd district
- Brian Smith, Republican, 66th district

=== State senator ===
- Joe Pittman, Republican, 41st district

=== United States representative ===
- Guy Reschenthaler, Republican, 14th district
- Glenn Thompson, Republican, 15th district

=== United States senators ===
- Dave McCormick, Republican
- John Fetterman, Democratic

== Education ==
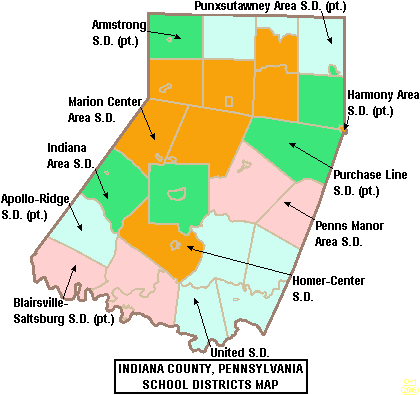
Map of Indiana County, Pennsylvania Public School Districts

=== Public school districts ===
School districts include:

- Armstrong School District (part)
- Apollo-Ridge School District (part)
- Harmony Area School District (part)
- Homer-Center School District
- Indiana Area School District
- Marion Center Area School District
- Penns Manor Area School District
- Punxsutawney Area School District (part)
- Purchase Line School District (part)
- River Valley School District formerly Blairsville-Saltsburg School District
- United School District

=== Post-secondary education ===
- Indiana University of Pennsylvania – Indiana
- Westmoreland County Community College – Indiana

== Environment ==
In 2003, the county was recommended for non-attainment under EPA ozone standards based upon mobile source contribution to smog-forming emissions.

The county is the site of the Homer City Generating Station, a coal-burning power plant. In 2002 the plant was ranked as second in emissions in the Toxics Release Inventory (TRI) in Pennsylvania. In 2003, the plant ranked high in the emissions of both sulfur dioxide and carbon dioxide, ranking 4th and 28th, respectively, in the nation. Such toxic emissions are injurious to people and other living things.

== Communities ==
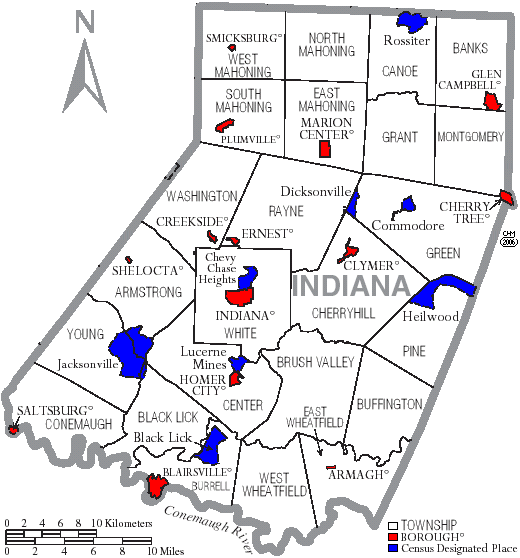
Map of Indiana County, Pennsylvania with Municipal Labels showing Boroughs (red), Townships (white), and Census-designated places (blue).

Under Pennsylvania law, there are four types of incorporated municipalities: cities, boroughs, townships, and, in at most two cases, towns. The following boroughs and townships are located in Indiana County:

=== Boroughs ===
- Armagh
- Blairsville
- Cherry Tree
- Clymer
- Creekside
- Ernest
- Glen Campbell
- Homer City
- Indiana (county seat)
- Marion Center
- Plumville
- Saltsburg
- Shelocta
- Smicksburg

=== Townships ===
- Armstrong
- Banks
- Black Lick
- Brush Valley
- Buffington
- Burrell
- Canoe
- Center
- Cherryhill
- Conemaugh
- East Mahoning
- East Wheatfield
- Grant
- Green
- Montgomery
- North Mahoning
- Pine
- Rayne
- South Mahoning
- Washington
- West Mahoning
- West Wheatfield
- White
- Young

=== Census-designated places ===
Census-designated places are geographical areas designated by the U.S. Census Bureau for the purposes of compiling demographic data. They are not actual jurisdictions under Pennsylvania law. Other unincorporated communities, such as villages, may be listed here as well.

- Alverda
- Black Lick
- Chevy Chase Heights
- Commodore
- Coral
- Dicksonville
- Graceton
- Heilwood
- Jacksonville
- Lucerne Mines
- Robinson
- Rossiter

=== Unincorporated communities ===
- Arcadia
- Clarksburg
- Covode
- Dilltown
- Dixonville
- Gipsy
- Home
- Iselin
- Jewtown
- Locust
- Loop
- Mentcle
- Nolo
- Rexis
- Rochester Mills
- Starford
- Strongstown
- Wehrum
- West Lebanon

=== Population ranking ===
The population ranking of the following table is based on the 2010 census of Indiana County.

* county seat

Rank	City/Town/etc.	Municipal type	Population (2010 Census)
1	* Indiana	Borough	13,975
2	Blairsville	Borough	3,412
3	Homer City	Borough	1,707
4	Chevy Chase Heights	CDP	1,502
5	Black Lick	CDP	1,462
6	Clymer	Borough	1,357
7	Lucerne Mines	CDP	937
8	Saltsburg	Borough	873
9	Heilwood	CDP	711
10	Rossiter	CDP	646
11	Jacksonville	CDP	637
12	Robinson	CDP	614
13	Dixonville	CDP	467
14	Ernest	Borough	462
15	Marion Center	Borough	451
16	Cherry Tree	Borough	364
17	Commodore	CDP	331
18	Coral	CDP	325
19	Creekside	Borough	309
20	Plumville	Borough	307
21	Graceton	CDP	257
22	Glen Campbell	Borough	245
23	Shelocta	Borough	130
24	Armagh	Borough	122
25	Smicksburg	Borough	46

== Notable people ==
- Edward Abbey, environmentalist and author
- John Buccigross, ESPN anchor, former co-host of NHL 2Night
- James H. Brady, Governor of Idaho 1909–11, U.S. Senator 1913–18, born in Indiana County
- Henry Homer "Doc" Gessler, professional baseball player and manager; born and died in Indiana Borough.
- Samuel Kier, "Grandfather of the American Oil Industry"
- Mary D. Lowman, one of first women mayors in Kansas; county native
- Ben McAdoo, former head coach, New York Giants
- Jim Nance, football player, running back for Syracuse University and professionally with New England/Boston Patriots
- James Stewart, iconic actor, born in Indiana Borough

== See also ==
- Indiana County Transit Authority
- National Register of Historic Places listings in Indiana County, Pennsylvania
