= Cherryhill Township, Pennsylvania =

Township in Pennsylvania, US

Coordinates: 40°38′32″N 79°00′26″W

Cherryhill Township, Indiana County, Pennsylvania
- Township
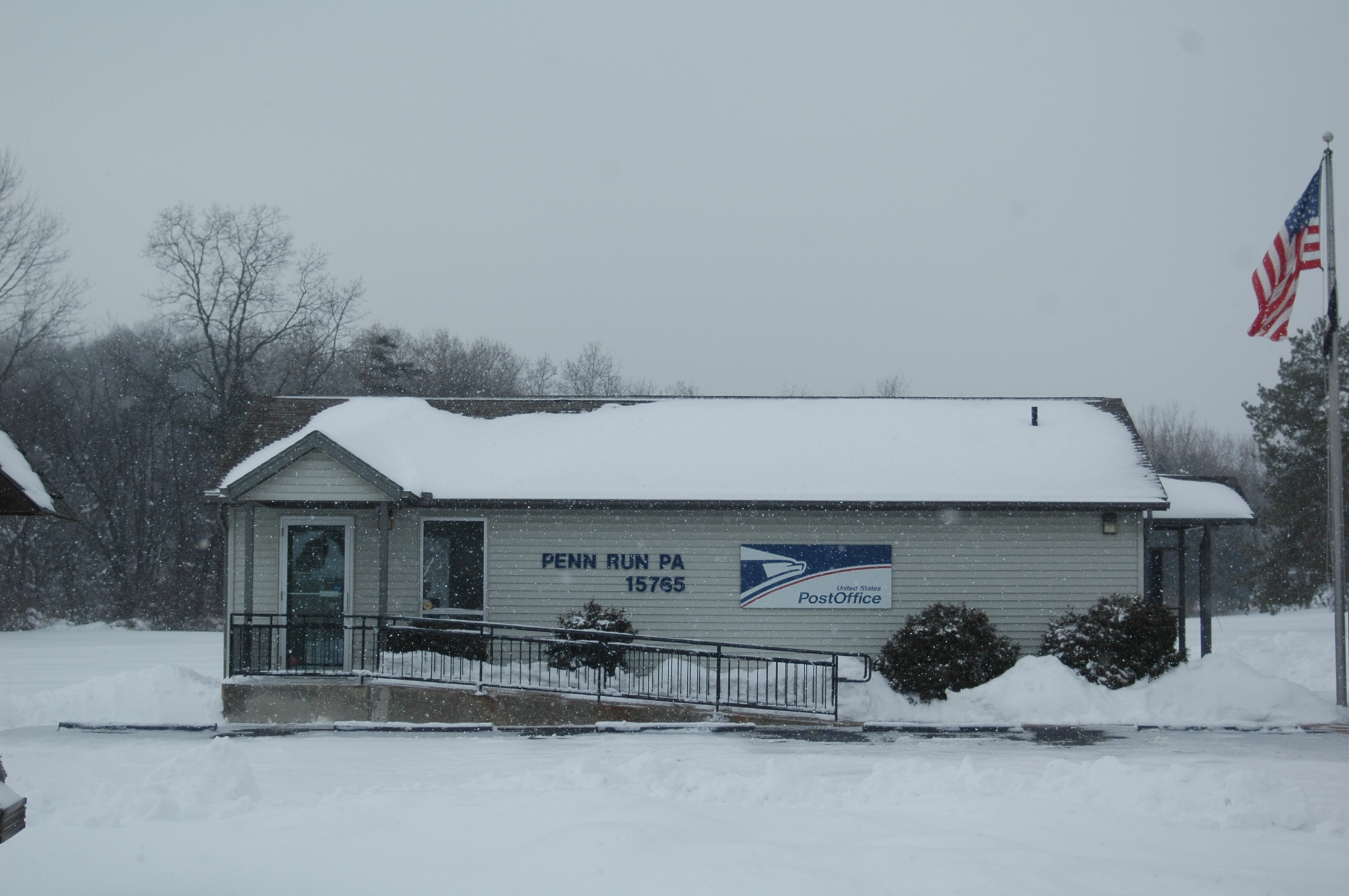
- The Post Office in Penn Run, a village in Cherryhill Township

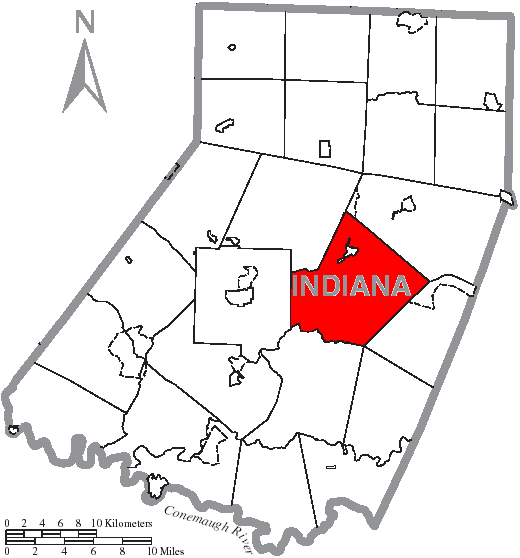
- Map of Indiana County, Pennsylvania Highlighting Cherryhill Township

- Map of Pennsylvania highlighting Indiana County
- Country: United States
- State: Pennsylvania
- County: Indiana

Area
  - Total: 49.50 sq mi (128.20 km^{2})
  - Land: 48.65 sq mi (125.99 km^{2})
  - Water: 0.85 sq mi (2.20 km^{2})

Population (2020)
  - Total: 2,477 ▼
  - Estimate (2021): 2,462
  - Density: 55/sq mi (21.2/km^{2})
- Time zone: UTC-5 (Eastern (EST))
  - Summer (DST): UTC-4 (EDT)
- FIPS code: 42-063-13072

Cherryhill Township is a township in Indiana County, Pennsylvania, United States. It was named for Cherry Hill Manor, which was surveyed to the Penns. The population was 2,477 at the 2020 census. It includes the communities of Buck Run, Hustonville, Ideal, Kenwood, Manor, Manver, Diamondville (previously Mitchell's Mills), Penn Run (previously Greenville), Pikes Peak, Rembrandt, Sample Run, and Weimer. The township surrounds but does not include the borough of Clymer.

== History ==
The George Diehl Homestead was listed on the National Register of Historic Places in 1987.

== Geography ==
According to the United States Census Bureau, the township has a total area of 49.5 square miles (128 km^{2}), of which 48.8 square miles (126 km^{2}) is land and 0.7 square miles (1.8 km^{2}) (1.43%) is water.

== Demographics ==
Historical population
Census	Pop.	Note	%±
1860	1,758		—
1870	1,976		12.4%
1880	2,243		13.5%
1890	1,957		−12.8%
1900	1,648		−15.8%
1910	2,198		33.4%
1920	2,050		−6.7%
1930	1,911		−6.8%
1940	2,158		12.9%
1950	1,955		−9.4%
1960	1,721		−12.0%
1970	1,747		1.5%
1980	2,540		45.4%
1990	2,764		8.8%
2000	2,842		2.8%
2010	2,765		−2.7%
2020	2,477		−10.4%
2021 (est.)	2,462		−0.6%
U.S. Decennial Census

As of the census of 2000, there were 2,842 people, 998 households, and 784 families residing in the township. The population density was 58.2 inhabitants per square mile (22.5/km^{2}). There were 1,099 housing units at an average density of 22.5/sq mi (8.7/km^{2}). The racial makeup of the township was 98.91% White, 0.49% African American, 0.07% Native American, 0.14% Asian, and 0.39% from two or more races. Hispanic or Latino of any race were 0.11% of the population.

There were 998 households, out of which 34.5% had children under the age of 18 living with them, 67.4% were married couples living together, 8.0% had a female householder with no husband present, and 21.4% were non-families. 18.9% of all households were made up of individuals, and 8.1% had someone living alone who was 65 years of age or older. The average household size was 2.72 and the average family size was 3.10.

In the township the population was spread out, with 24.2% under the age of 18, 7.9% from 18 to 24, 27.5% from 25 to 44, 28.8% from 45 to 64, and 11.7% who were 65 years of age or older. The median age was 40 years. For every 100 females, there were 103.4 males. For every 100 females age 18 and over, there were 100.1 males.

The median income for a household in the township was $35,909, and the median income for a family was $40,847. Males had a median income of $32,049 versus $22,045 for females. The per capita income for the township was $14,910. About 7.0% of families and 8.5% of the population were below the poverty line, including 7.6% of those under age 18 and 5.6% of those age 65 or over.
