= Special routes of U.S. Route 422 =

Special routes of U.S. Route 422

Highway system
- United States Numbered Highway System; List; Special; Divided

At least four special routes of U.S. Route 422 currently exist and at least three have been decommissioned.

== Existing ==
=== New Castle business route ===
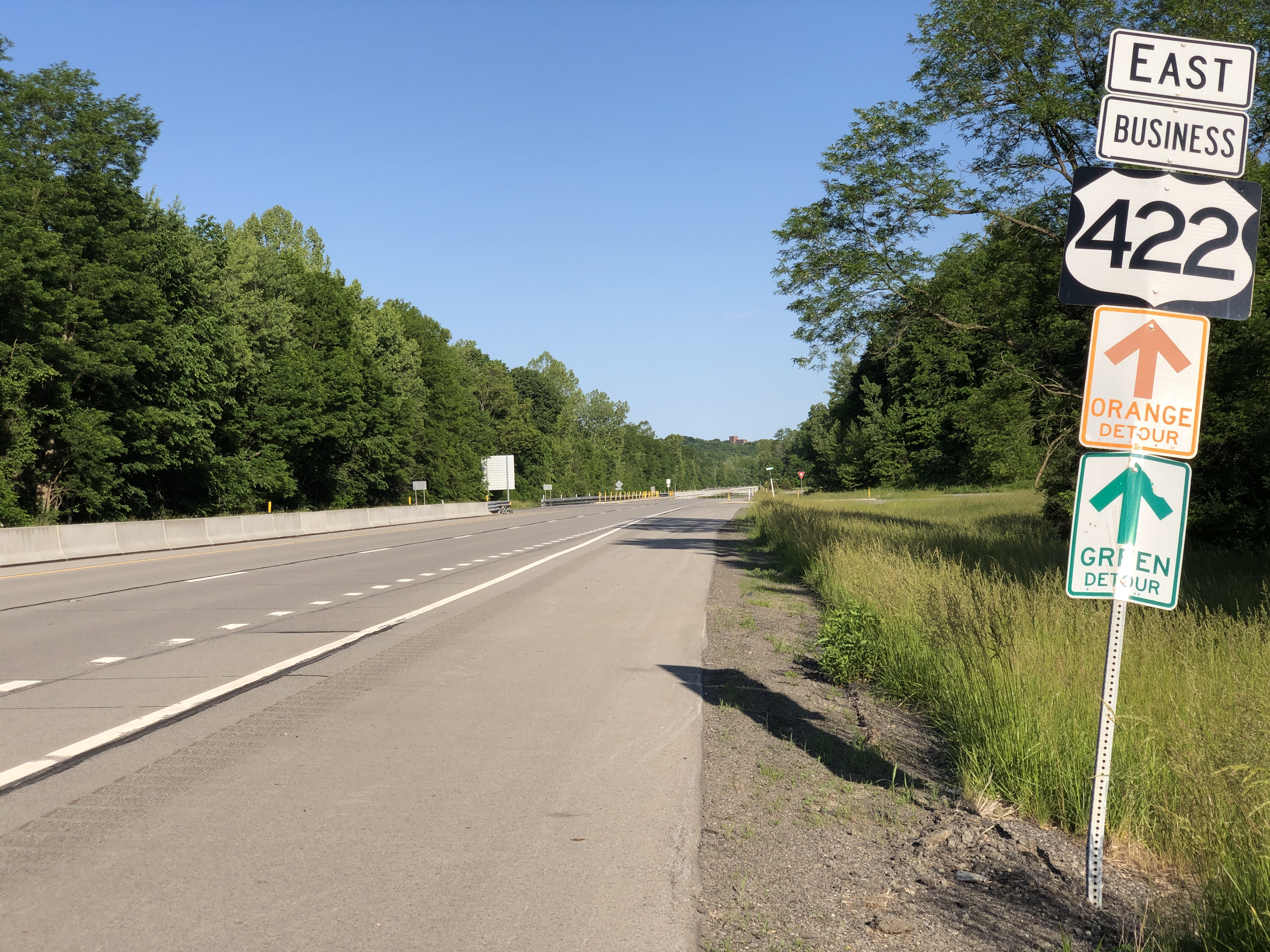
US 422 Bus. eastbound past I-376/US 422 in Union Township

U.S. Route 422 Business
- Location: New Castle, Pennsylvania
- Existed: 1977–present

In New Castle, U.S. Route 422 Business is a 7-mile (11 km) route following the original alignment of its parent. At its western edge, the route leaves the freeway and travels as a four-lane highway along the Shenango River. Amongst a combination of residences and light industry, the route meets US 224. Winding its way through the city center, the route changes directions several times as it functions as portions of State Street, Jefferson Avenue, Washington Street, and, in a more tree-lined residential area, Butler Street. Closer to its eastern edge, it passes commercial development, and 422 Business joins with US 422 as the eastern end of the New Castle bypass.

=== Kittanning business route ===
U.S. Route 422 Business
- Location: Kittanning, Pennsylvania
- Existed: 2001–present

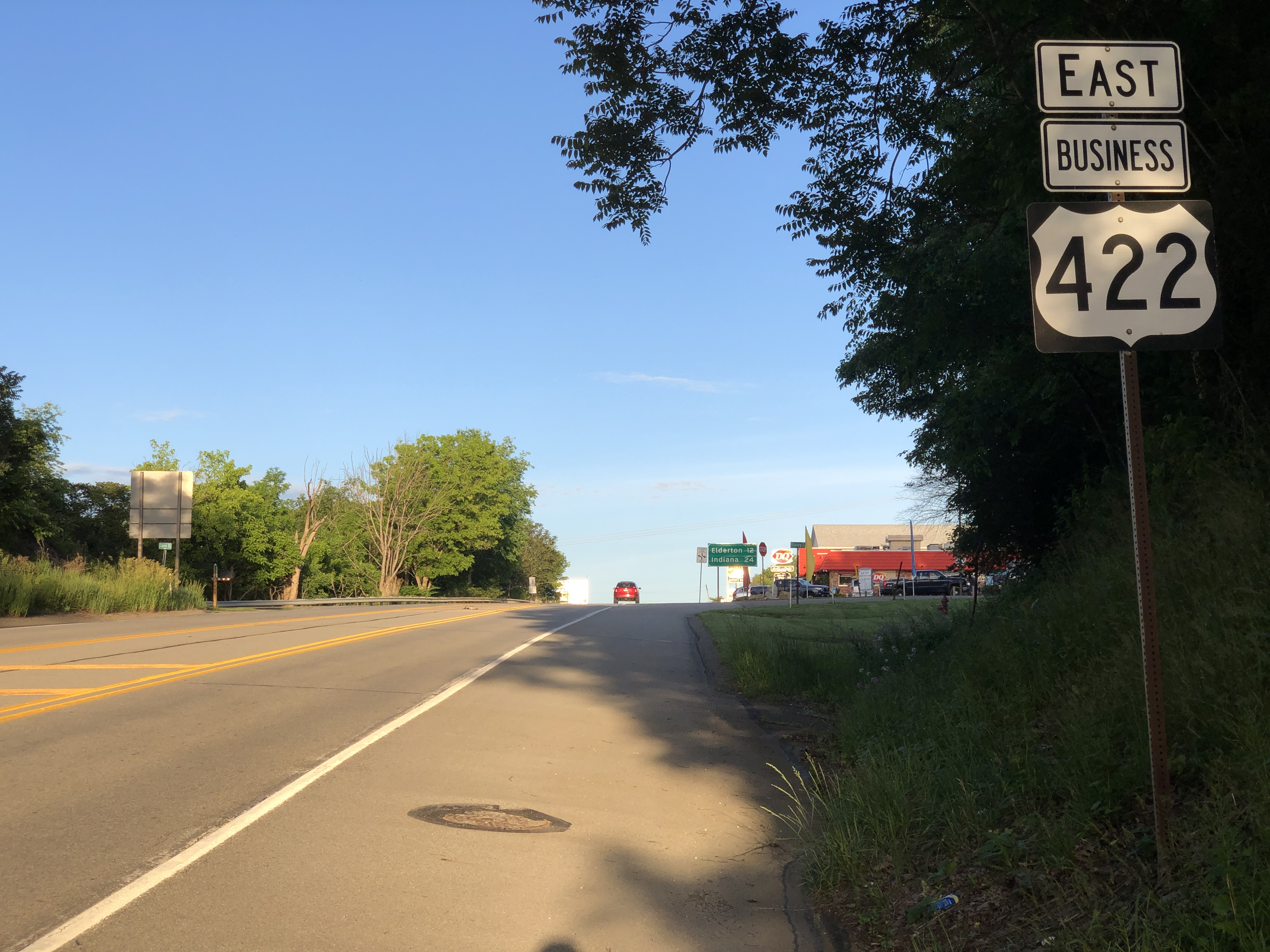
US 422 Bus. eastbound in Manor Township

In Kittanning, U.S. Route 422 Business is a 5-mile (8.0 km) route following the original alignment of its parent. It begins in the west with a concurrency with PA 268, before arching around commercial development in West Kittanning and crossing the Kittanning Citizens Bridge. After serving as the major Water Street, the route winds out of Kittanning toward the edge of the bypass.

=== Indiana business route ===
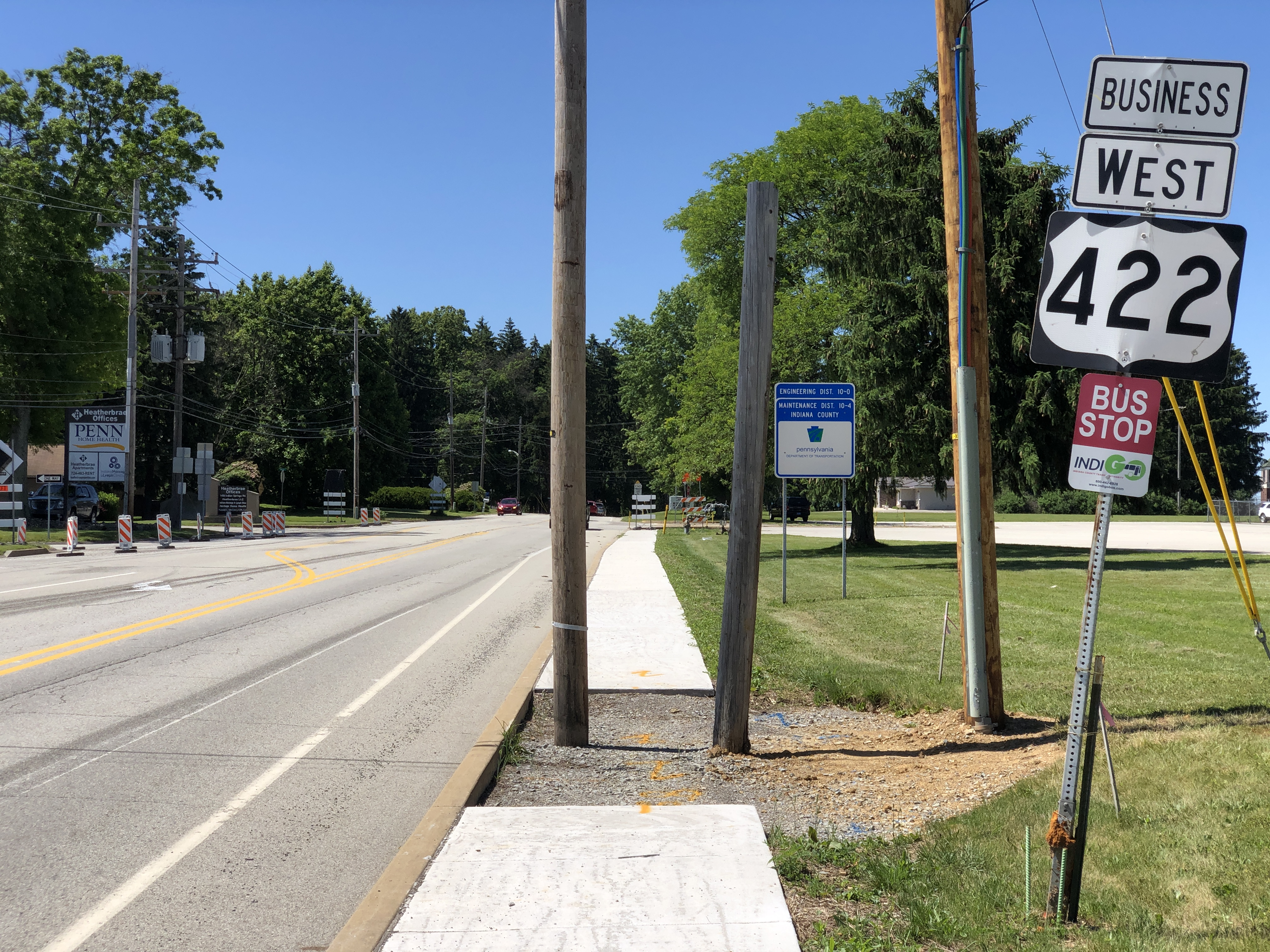
US 422 Bus. westbound past PA 286 in White Township

U.S. Route 422 Business
- Location: Indiana, Pennsylvania
- Existed: 1997–present

In Indiana, Pennsylvania, U.S. Route 422 Business is a 7-mile (11 km) loop around Indiana, Pennsylvania. Despite functioning as a business route for a freeway bypass, the road does not completely follow its parent's original path, nor does it enter the city center. It instead encompasses a much more rural path, starting in the west on Pike Avenue near the outskirts of Indiana, then corresponding with Warren Road and Indian Springs Road, before reaching some development on Wayne Avenue, as it meets back up with the freeway.

=== Reading business route ===
U.S. Route 422 Business
- Location: Reading, Pennsylvania
- Length: 7.285 mi (11.724 km)
- Existed: 1964–present

U.S. Route 422 Business (US 422 Bus.) is a 7.29-mile-long (11.73 km) business route of US 422 located in the Reading, Pennsylvania area. The route is one of four auxiliary routes of US 422 in Pennsylvania. Its western terminus is at an interchange with US 222 and US 422 in Wyomissing. Its eastern terminus is at an interchange with US 422 in Reiffton. US 422 Bus. heads east from US 222/US 422 along Penn Avenue, passing through Wyomissing and West Reading. The route has an interchange with the US 422 freeway before it crosses the Schuylkill River into Reading. US 422 Bus. passes through downtown Reading on the one-way pair of Franklin Street eastbound and Washington Street westbound, intersecting the southern terminus of Pennsylvania Route 183 (PA 183) and crossing US 222 Bus. The business route heads into the eastern part of the city southeast on Perkiomen Avenue before following the one-way pair of Perkiomen Avenue eastbound and Mineral Spring Road westbound into Mount Penn. US 422 Bus. continues along Perkiomen Avenue to St. Lawrence, where it intersects the western terminus of PA 562 and turns southeast. The route passes through Reiffton before it merges into eastbound US 422.

With the creation of the U.S. Highway System in 1926, the road between Harrisburg and Reading was designated as part of US 22, which ran along what was designated the William Penn Highway in 1916 and PA 3 in 1924, while the road between Reading and Philadelphia was designated as US 120, which ran concurrent with PA 13. In 1928, the US 120/PA 13 designation between Reading and Philadelphia was changed to US 422/PA 17 in order to provide for one number for the Benjamin Franklin Highway. The concurrent state route designations were removed from US 22 and US 422 by 1930. US 22 headed into Reading on Penn Street and continued east to 9th Street, where it turned north and US 422 continued along Penn Street and Perkiomen Avenue east out of Reading. US 22 ran concurrent with PA 83 between 2nd and 9th streets while US 422 ran concurrent with PA 73 between Chestnut Street in Reading and 23rd Street in Mount Penn. In 1931, US 22 was moved to a more direct alignment between Harrisburg and Allentown, and US 422 was extended west along the former alignment between Harrisburg and Reading. In the 1930s, US 422/PA 73 was shifted to Mineral Spring Road between Reading and Mount Penn in the 1930s and a one-way pair along Perkiomen Avenue and Mineral Spring Road in the 1950s. US 422 was shifted to the Warren Street Bypass and West Shore Bypass, and US 422 Bus. was designated onto the former alignment through Reading. The concurrent PA 83 and PA 73 designations were removed by 1966. In the 1970s, US 422 Bus. was shifted to its current one-way pair through downtown Reading.

== Former ==
=== Reading alternate route ===
U.S. Route 422 Alternate
- Location: Reading, Pennsylvania

U.S. Route 422 Alternate (US 422 Alt.) was an alternate route of US 422 through the city of Reading, Pennsylvania. The route began at US 422/PA 83 (Penn Street) as a one-way pair, with the eastbound direction heading south along 2nd Street and east on Franklin Street and the westbound direction running west along Chestnut Street and north on 4th Street to end at US 422/PA 83. US 422 Alt. followed the one-way pair concurrent with PA 83. The route continued east on Franklin Street and west on Chestnut Street, intersecting US 222 at 5th Street. At the 9th street intersection, PA 83 headed south and westbound US 422 Alt. joined with PA 73 at the Bingaman Street intersection. The alternate route continued to its eastern terminus at US 422 (Perkiomen Avenue), where PA 73 continued east along with US 422. US 422 Alt. was first designated by 1953. The alternate route was decommissioned in 1964 following the rerouting of US 422 to the West Shore Bypass and the establishment of US 422 Bus. along the US 422 alignment through downtown Reading.

Major intersections

The entire route was in Reading, Berks County.

mi	km	Destinations	Notes
		US 422 (Penn Street); PA 83 (2nd Street)	Western terminus; western terminus of PA 83 concurrency
		US 122 / US 222 (5th Street)	
		PA 73 (Bingaman Street); PA 83 (9th Street)	Eastern terminus of PA 83 concurrency; western terminus of PA 73 concurrency
		US 422 / PA 73 (Perkiomen Avenue/Mineral Spring Road)	Eastern terminus; eastern terminus of PA 73 concurrency
1.000 mi = 1.609 km; 1.000 km = 0.621 mi: Concurrency terminus

=== Philadelphia alternate route ===
U.S. Route 422 Alternate
- Location: Norristown-Philadelphia, Pennsylvania

U.S. Route 422 Alternate (US 422 Alt.) was an alternate route of US 422 between Norristown and Philadelphia in Pennsylvania. The route began at US 422 (Main Street/Airy Street) on the western edge of Norristown and continued through Norristown on Main Street, intersecting US 202. US 422 Alt. left Norristown and became Ridge Pike, continuing southeast through suburban areas to Barren Hill. Here, US 422 Alt. intersected US 422 again and the routes switched alignments, with US 422 Alt. heading southeast along Germantown Pike. The route entered Philadelphia and became Germantown Avenue, passing through the Chestnut Hill section of the city. In the Germantown neighborhood, US 422 Alt. turned south onto Washington Lane and east onto Wayne Avenue. The alternate route headed southeast onto Clarissa Street and reached its eastern terminus at US 1/US 13 (Hunting Park Avenue). US 422 Alt. was first designated by 1950, following Main Street through Norristown before continuing along Ridge Pike through Barren Hill. The alternate route continued into Philadelphia and ran southeast on Ridge Avenue, ending at an intersection with US 1 Byp./US 13 Byp. (City Line Avenue/East River Drive) and US 309 (Lincoln Drive). US 422 Alt. had replaced mainline US 422 east of Barren Hill. By 1960, US 422 Alt. was realigned to use Germantown Avenue, Washington Lane, Wayne Avenue, and Clarissa Street east of Barren Hill, with mainline US 422 replacing the route on Ridge Avenue east of there. US 422 Alt. was decommissioned in the 1960s, at which point it was replaced by mainline US 422.

Major intersections

County	Location	mi	km	Destinations	Notes
Montgomery	Norristown			US 422 (Main Street/Airy Street)	Western terminus
Montgomery	Norristown			US 202 south (Markley Street)	
Montgomery	Norristown			US 202 north (Dekalb Street)	
Montgomery	Whitemarsh Township			US 422 east (Ridge Pike)	Western terminus of US 422 concurrency
Montgomery	Whitemarsh Township			US 422 west (Germantown Pike)	Eastern terminus of US 422 concurrency
Philadelphia	Philadelphia			US 1 / US 13 (Hunting Park Avenue)	Eastern terminus
1.000 mi = 1.609 km; 1.000 km = 0.621 mi: Concurrency terminus

=== Philadelphia bypass ===
U.S. Route 422 Bypass
- Location: Barren Hill-Philadelphia, Pennsylvania

U.S. Route 422 Bypass (US 422 Byp.) was a bypass route of US 422 in Philadelphia. The bypass began at US 422 in Barren Hill and continued southeast along Germantown Pike. US 422 Byp. crossed into Philadelphia and became Germantown Avenue, passing through the Chestnut Hill neighborhood. The route turned southeast onto Chew Street before curving east on Olney Avenue, crossing US 611 (Broad Street). US 422 Byp. continued east onto Tabor Street and reached its eastern terminus at an intersection with US 1 Byp./US 13 Byp./US 422 (Roosevelt Boulevard). US 422 Byp. was first designated by 1940. In the 1940s, the route was decommissioned and replaced with mainline US 422.

Major intersections

County	Location	mi	km	Destinations	Notes
Montgomery	Whitemarsh Township			US 422 (Germantown Pike/Church Road)	Western terminus
Philadelphia	Philadelphia			US 309 north (Bethlehem Pike)	Western terminus of US 309 concurrency
Philadelphia	Philadelphia			US 309 south (Allens Lane)	Eastern terminus of US 309 concurrency
Philadelphia	Philadelphia			US 611 (Broad Street)	
Philadelphia	Philadelphia			US 1 Byp. / US 13 Byp. / US 422 (Roosevelt Boulevard)	Eastern terminus
1.000 mi = 1.609 km; 1.000 km = 0.621 mi: Concurrency terminus

== See also ==
- List of special routes of the United States Numbered Highway System
