= Kittanning =

Kittanning may refer to:

- Kittanning, Pennsylvania, United States
- West Kittanning, Pennsylvania, United States
- Kittanning Township, Armstrong County, Pennsylvania, United States
- Kittanning (village), a Native American village that was located at the site of the present-day borough in Pennsylvania, United States
- Kittanning Coal, coal seams in the Kittanning cyclothem of the Pennsylvanian Epoch
- Kittanning Expedition, a raid during the French and Indian War that led to the destruction of the American Indian village of Kittanning
- Kittanning Gap, a gap at the summit of Allegheny Ridge in Central Pennsylvania, United States
- Kittanning Path, a major east-west Native American trail used during the 18th century in Western Pennsylvania, United States
- Kittanning Citizens Bridge, a through truss bridge in Kittanning, Pennsylvania, United States
- Clear Creek State Forest, a Pennsylvania State Forest in Pennsylvania Bureau of Forestry District #8, formerly known as "Kittanning State Forest"
- USS Kittanning (YTB-787), a United States Navy large harbor tug

== See also ==
- Katanning, Western Australia
