= Ridge Pike =

Historic road in Pennsylvania, U.S.

Route information
- Maintained by PennDOT, Municipality of Norristown, Montgomery County, and City of Philadelphia
- Existed: 1706–present

Major junctions
- West end: US 422 in Douglassville
- PA 100 in Pottstown; PA 113 in Trappe; PA 29 in Collegeville; PA 363 in Trooper; US 202 in Norristown; I-476 near Conshohocken; US 1 in Philadelphia; US 13 in Philadelphia; PA 611 in Philadelphia
- East end: Wood Street in Philadelphia

Location
- Country: United States
- State: Pennsylvania
- Counties: Berks, Montgomery, Philadelphia

Highway system
- Pennsylvania State Route System; Interstate; US; State; Scenic; Legislative

Ridge Pike is a major historic road in the U.S. state of Pennsylvania that opened in 1706 that originally connected Wissahickon Creek to Perkiomen Creek. Inside Philadelphia, it is called Ridge Avenue. Going westward, it traverses many eastern Pennsylvania neighborhoods in Montgomery County including Conshohocken and beyond, connecting with Germantown Pike near Collegeville and continuing to Pottstown. In Montgomery County, Ridge Pike is called Main Street in the Norristown area and again in Collegeville and Trappe, and is called High Street in the Pottstown area.

The intersection of 13th Street and Ridge Avenue is notable for being the location of Benjamin Franklin's kite experiment which led to the proof that lightning is electricity. Portions of Ridge Pike carried U.S. Route 422 (US 422) before the route was moved onto a freeway alignment between west of Pottstown and King of Prussia.

== Route description ==
=== Berks and Montgomery counties ===
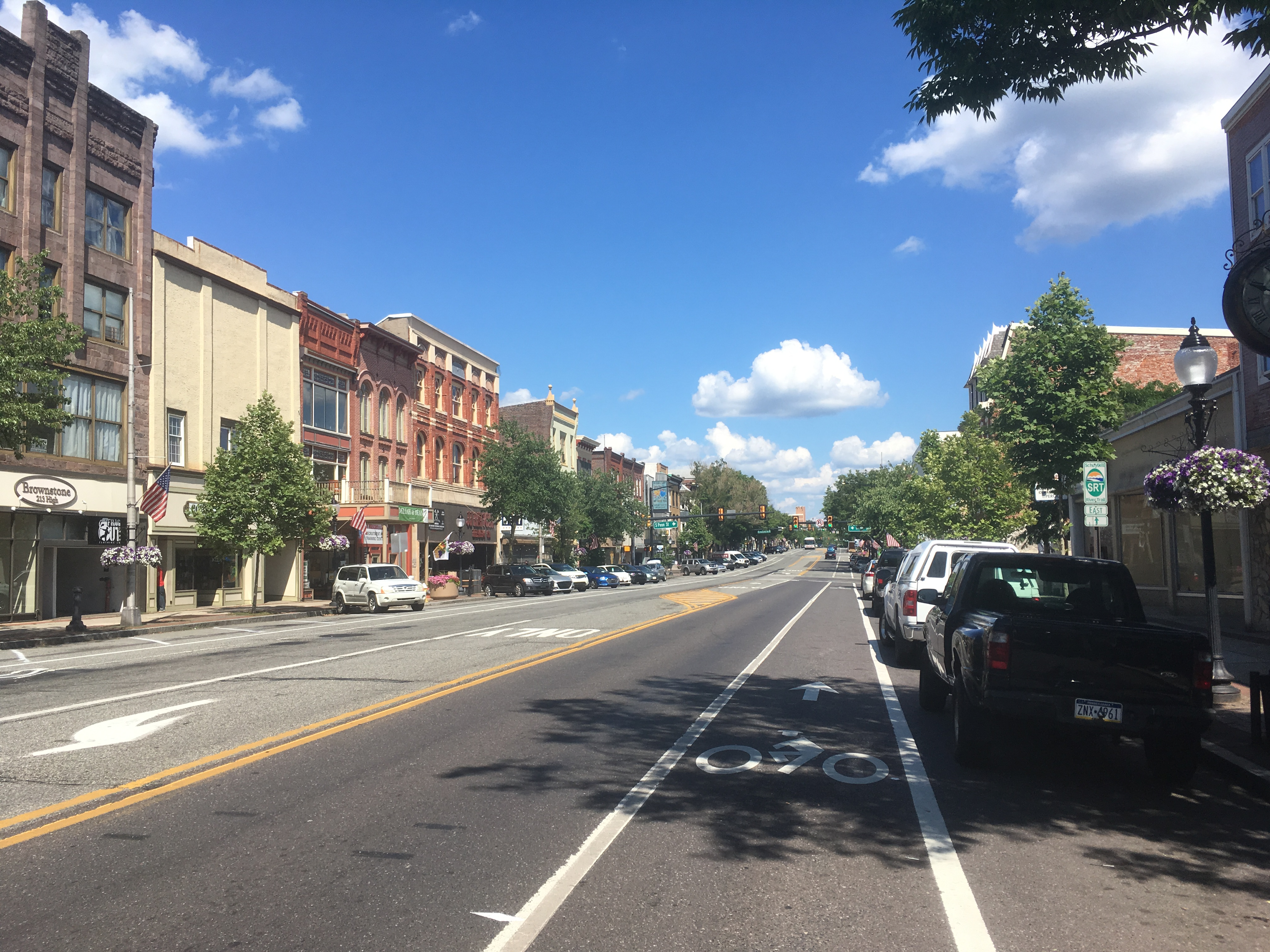
East High Street past Hanover Street in Pottstown

US 422 splits from Benjamin Franklin Highway onto the Pottstown Bypass freeway at an eastbound exit and westbound entrance east of the community of Douglassville in Amity Township in Berks County. From this interchange, Benjamin Franklin Highway heads east-southeast as a four-lane divided highway designated as State Route 2022 (SR 2022), an unsigned quadrant route, into Douglass Township, passing through a mix of woodland and residential and commercial development. Farther east, the road curves east and crosses a Norfolk Southern railroad spur as it passes near commercial areas. The road enters West Pottsgrove Township in Montgomery County and becomes West High Street, a four-lane undivided road that is designated as SR 4031. West High Street runs south-southeast through a mix of homes and businesses in the community of Stowe, turning to the northeast. The road enters the borough of Pottstown and runs between residential and commercial development to the north and Norfolk Southern's Harrisburg Line parallel to the south, curving to the east-southeast. West High Street comes to a partial interchange with PA 100, with a ramp from northbound PA 100 to westbound West High Street and a ramp from eastbound West High Street to southbound PA 100. Past this interchange, the roadway heads south of the Pottsgrove Manor historic house museum before it passes under the Colebrookdale Railroad and over Manatawny Creek as the road narrows to two lanes and the parallel Norfolk Southern line heads further to the south. East High Street heads north of the Montgomery County Community College West Campus and runs east through the commercial downtown of Pottstown as a three-lane road with a center left-turn lane, passing north of the Charles W. Dickinson Transportation Center serving PART buses before coming to an intersection with Hanover Street. The road continues through the downtown area before running past a mix of homes and businesses in the eastern part of Pottstown. East High Street narrows to two lanes as it passes south of The Hill School and heads through residential areas, regaining a center left-turn lane. The roadway enters business areas and widens to a five-lane road with a center left-turn lane. East High Street leaves Pottstown for Lower Pottsgrove Township as it passes to the north of Pottstown Hospital. The roadway narrows to three lanes with a center left-turn lane and passes through a mix of residential and commercial development in the community of Sanatoga.

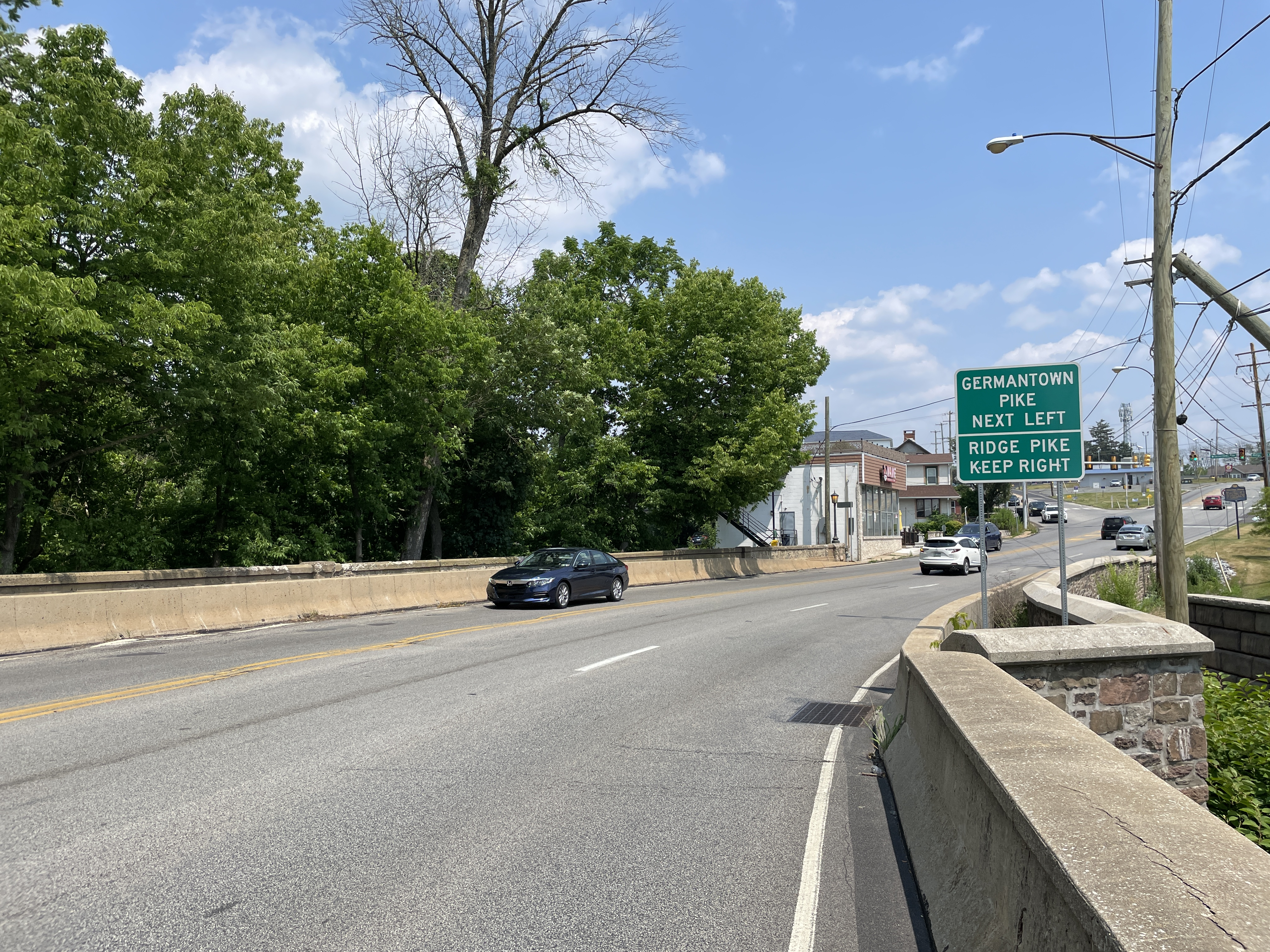
Ridge Pike eastbound approaching Germantown Pike near Collegeville

At an intersection with Evergreen Road/Rupert Road on the border of Lower Pottsgrove Township and Limerick Township, the road changes names from East High Street to Ridge Pike. From this intersection, Ridge Pike heads east into Limerick Township as a four-lane undivided road. The road comes to a westbound exit and eastbound entrance that connects to Evergreen Road and an interchange with the US 422 freeway. From here, Ridge Pike continues east as a four-lane undivided road through commercial areas, narrowing to two lanes as it passes to the north of Heritage Field Airport. The road gains a center left-turn lane as it heads through a mix of homes and businesses with some fields, curving to the southeast. Ridge Pike becomes a four-lane undivided road as it continues southeast, turning back into a three-lane road with a center left-turn lane. The road heads past businesses as it runs through the community of Limerick and intersects Swamp Pike/Lewis Road. A short distance later, the roadway narrows to two lanes and runs past homes. Ridge Pike gains a center left-turn lane as it continues southeast through residential and commercial development and some farmland and woodland. The roadway loses the center turn lane and becomes four lanes as it passes businesses and comes to an intersection with Township Line Road, at which point it heads into Upper Providence Township. Here, the name of the road becomes West Main Street as it turns into a three-lane road with a center left-turn lane and runs through residential areas.

The road enters the borough of Trappe and narrows to two lanes as it passes homes and some businesses, coming to an intersection with PA 113. West Main Street continues through developed areas and crosses into the borough of Collegeville, where it becomes East Main Street and runs through residential areas and passes south of the Ursinus College campus. The road curves to the south-southeast and passes through the commercial downtown of Collegeville before it crosses the Perkiomen Trail and comes to an intersection with PA 29. Ridge Pike heads east and crosses the Perkiomen Creek on the Perkiomen Bridge into Lower Providence Township, where it reaches an intersection with the western terminus of Germantown Pike. From here, Ridge Pike turns southeast and becomes a four-lane undivided road that passes commercial establishments. The road becomes three lanes with two westbound lanes and one eastbound lane as it heads into forested areas of Evansburg State Park and becomes two lanes as it crosses Skippack Creek. Ridge Pike gains a second eastbound lane as it passes through more of the state park. The road leaves Evansburg State Park and heads into wooded areas with residences. The road becomes three lanes with a center left-turn lane as it passes through commercial areas in the community of Eagleville. Ridge Pike continues through a mix of residential and business areas and curves to the south-southeast. The road passes businesses as it comes to an intersection with PA 363 at Park Avenue in the community of Trooper, at which point SR 4031 ends and PA 363 turns southeast to follow Ridge Pike. Ridge Pike continues through commercial areas before PA 363 splits to the southwest along Trooper Road.

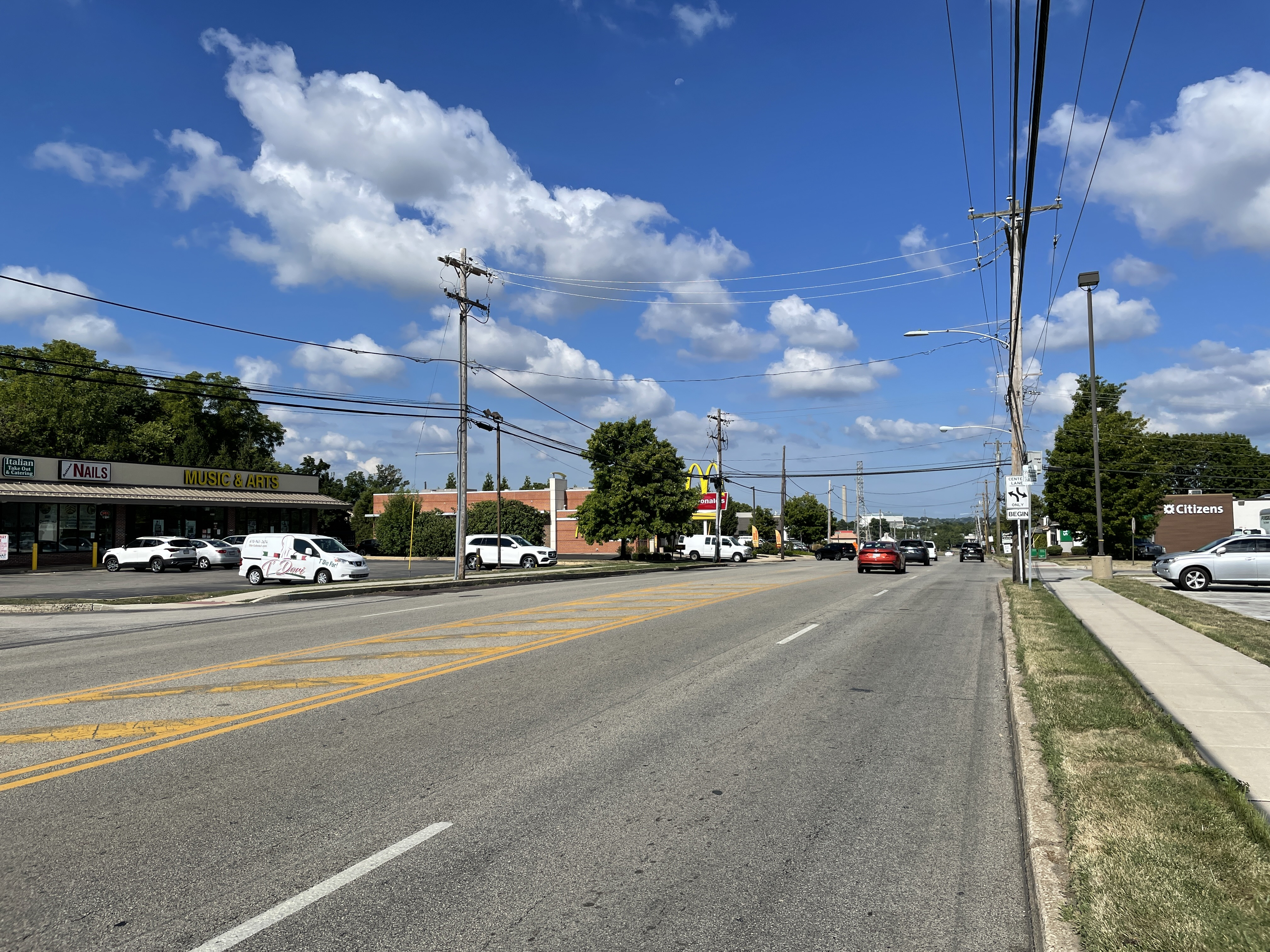
Ridge Pike westbound past Butler Pike in Plymouth Township

Upon crossing Trooper Road, the road enters West Norriton Township and becomes West Main Street, which is designated as SR 3009. West Main Street heads southeast past businesses and passes northeast of a golf course. The road narrows to two lanes as it continues through commercial areas, coming to an intersection with Egypt Road in the community of Jeffersonville. Past this intersection, West Main Street widens to four lanes and heads through residential areas with some businesses. The road continues southeast through wooded neighborhoods before passing commercial establishments. The road reaches the western border of the borough of Norristown, where SR 3009 ends and West Airy Street, which is one-way westbound, joins West Main Street. At this point, West Main Street heads into Norristown as a local road that has two eastbound lanes and one westbound lane. The road runs southeast through urban areas of homes with some businesses. Farther southeast, West Main Street crosses Stony Creek and SEPTA's Manayunk/Norristown Line at-grade south of the Main Street station before it intersects southbound US 202 at Markley Street. At this point, West Main Street passes businesses and heads east-southeast into the commercial downtown of Norristown as a two-lane road. The road becomes East Main Street upon crossing Swede Street and passes south of the Montgomery County Courthouse before running through more of the downtown area. East Main Street crosses northbound US 202 at Dekalb Street and leaves downtown Norristown, continuing through urban residential and business areas. The road gains a center left-turn lane and runs east past commercial establishments.

The road leaves Norristown for Plymouth Township and becomes Ridge Pike again. Ridge Pike is a county road that runs through a mix of homes and businesses in the communities of Black Horse and Mogeetown, widening into a five-lane road with a center left-turn lane and turning to the southeast. The road loses the center turn lane and passes over the Pennsylvania Turnpike (I-276) and Norfolk Southern's Dale Secondary railroad line, running through commercial areas and coming to a bridge over Norfolk Southern's Morrisville Connecting Track railroad line. Ridge Pike heads east past several businesses, curving southeast and becoming a divided highway at the Alan Wood Road intersection that has a westbound jughandle. From here, the road becomes SR 3056 and passes over the Cross County Trail before it comes to an interchange with I-476. Past this interchange, Ridge Pike continues through commercial areas and passes through the community of Seven Stars. Here, SR 3056 ends at an intersection with Chemical Road, Colwell Road, and North Lane, and the road becomes county-maintained again. At this point, Ridge Pike turns east and becomes a five-lane road with a center left-turn lane. The road comes to an intersection with Butler Pike in the community of Harmonville, at which point it enters Whitemarsh Township. Ridge Pike becomes four lanes and heads into residential areas, passing to the south of a golf course. The road crosses Joshua Road and continues southeast through suburban areas of homes with some businesses. Farther southeast, Ridge Pike becomes a three-lane road with two westbound lanes and one eastbound lane, heading into Springfield Township and running through wooded areas of development.

=== Philadelphia County ===
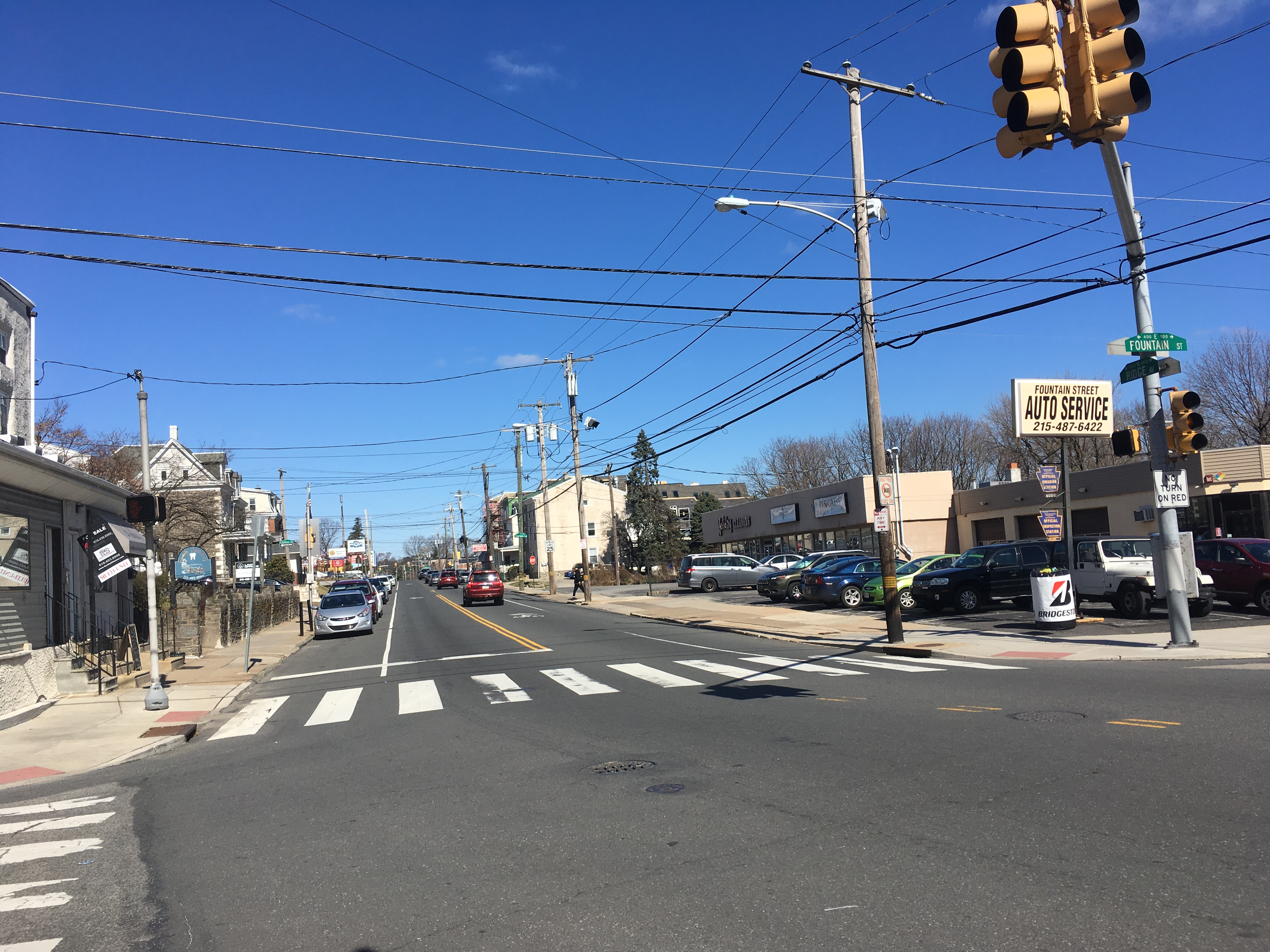
Ridge Avenue northbound in the Roxborough neighborhood of Philadelphia

Upon intersecting Northwestern Avenue, the road heads into the city of Philadelphia in Philadelphia County and becomes Ridge Avenue, which is designated as SR 3009. Ridge Avenue heads south-southeast as a five-lane road with a center left-turn lane through a mix of residential and commercial areas in the Andorra neighborhood. The road heads south and becomes a six-lane road as it comes to a southbound exit and northbound entrance with Henry Avenue. At this point, Ridge Avenue becomes a two-lane undivided road that heads south-southeast into the Roxborough neighborhood, passing a mix of homes and businesses. The road curves south and then southeast as it continues through the neighborhood. Ridge Avenue continues southeast past several businesses and some homes, passing northeast of Roxborough High School. The road heads into more urban areas of homes and businesses as it heads into the downtown area of Roxborough. Ridge Avenue continues south-southeast through urban areas and passes west of Roxborough Memorial Hospital. The road passes urban homes and curves to the southwest into the Wissahickon neighborhood, descending a hill. Ridge Avenue curves south and comes to a bridge over SEPTA's Manayunk/Norristown Line before it makes a turn to the southeast and passes south of the Wissahickon station along the SEPTA line. The road heads through commercial areas and passes north of SEPTA's Wissahickon Transportation Center before it crosses Wissahickon Creek. At this point, Ridge Avenue comes to an interchange that connects to I-76 (Schuylkill Expressway) and US 1 (City Avenue) across the Schuylkill River, Kelly Drive, and Lincoln Drive.

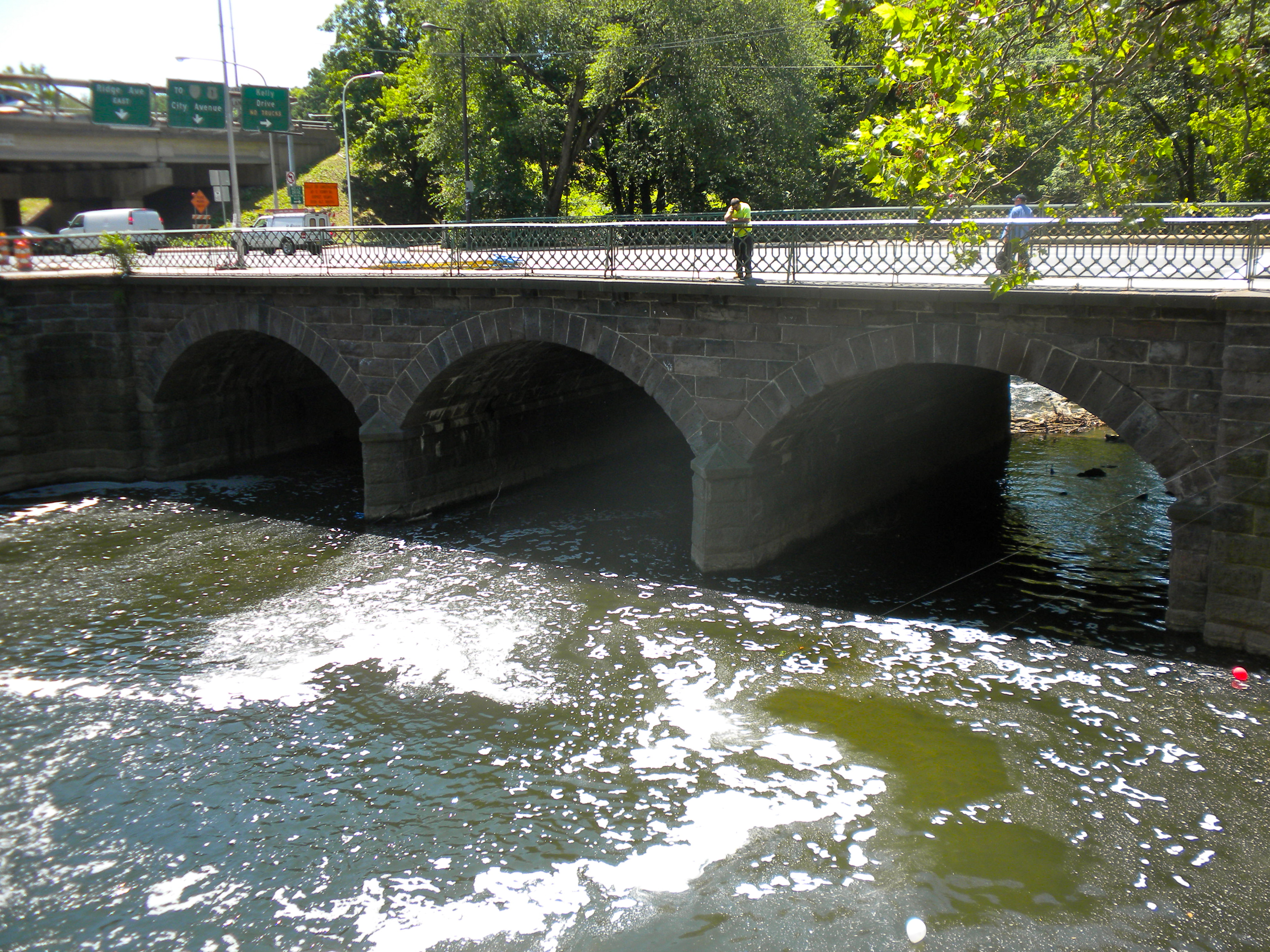
Ridge Avenue on a bridge over the Wissahickon Creek in Philadelphia

Past this interchange, Ridge Avenue heads into the East Falls neighborhood and heads east-southeast through urban residential areas with some businesses. The road passes under the Twin Bridges which carry US 1 (Roosevelt Expressway) across the Schuylkill River, at which point it comes to ramps that provide access to northbound US 1 and from southbound US 1, before crossing under CSX's Trenton Subdivision railroad line. Ridge Avenue intersects Allegheny Avenue and turns south, passing between Laurel Hill Cemetery to the west and urban development to the east. The road intersects US 13 at Hunting Park Avenue, at which point US 13 turns south to follow Ridge Avenue. Ridge Avenue heads southeast between Fairmount Park to the west and urban homes to the east. US 13 splits to the south onto 33rd Street north of SEPTA's 33rd and Dauphin Bus Loop and Ridge Avenue continues southeast into the Strawberry Mansion neighborhood, passing through urban areas of homes. The road passes southwest of Strawberry Mansion High School past 32nd Street. Ridge Avenue continues through urban development and passes over Amtrak's Northeast Corridor railroad line. Farther southeast, Ridge Avenue crosses Cecil B. Moore Avenue and heads into the Fairmount neighborhood, where it passes to the east of Girard College and comes to an intersection with Girard Avenue, which carries SEPTA's Route 15 trolley line. Following this, the road continues southeast through urban areas of homes and comes to an intersection with Fairmount Avenue and PA 611 (Broad Street), the latter of which SEPTA's Broad Street Line subway runs underneath. At this point, SEPTA's Broad–Ridge Spur subway line runs underneath Ridge Avenue and the road runs through more urban areas, coming to an intersection with Spring Garden Street. At this point, SR 3009 ends and road becomes a city street, passing under the abandoned Reading Viaduct. Upon crossing Callowhill Street, Ridge Avenue becomes one-way northbound and ends at an intersection with Wood Street north of Center City. The Broad–Ridge Spur subway line continues south into Center City.

== History ==
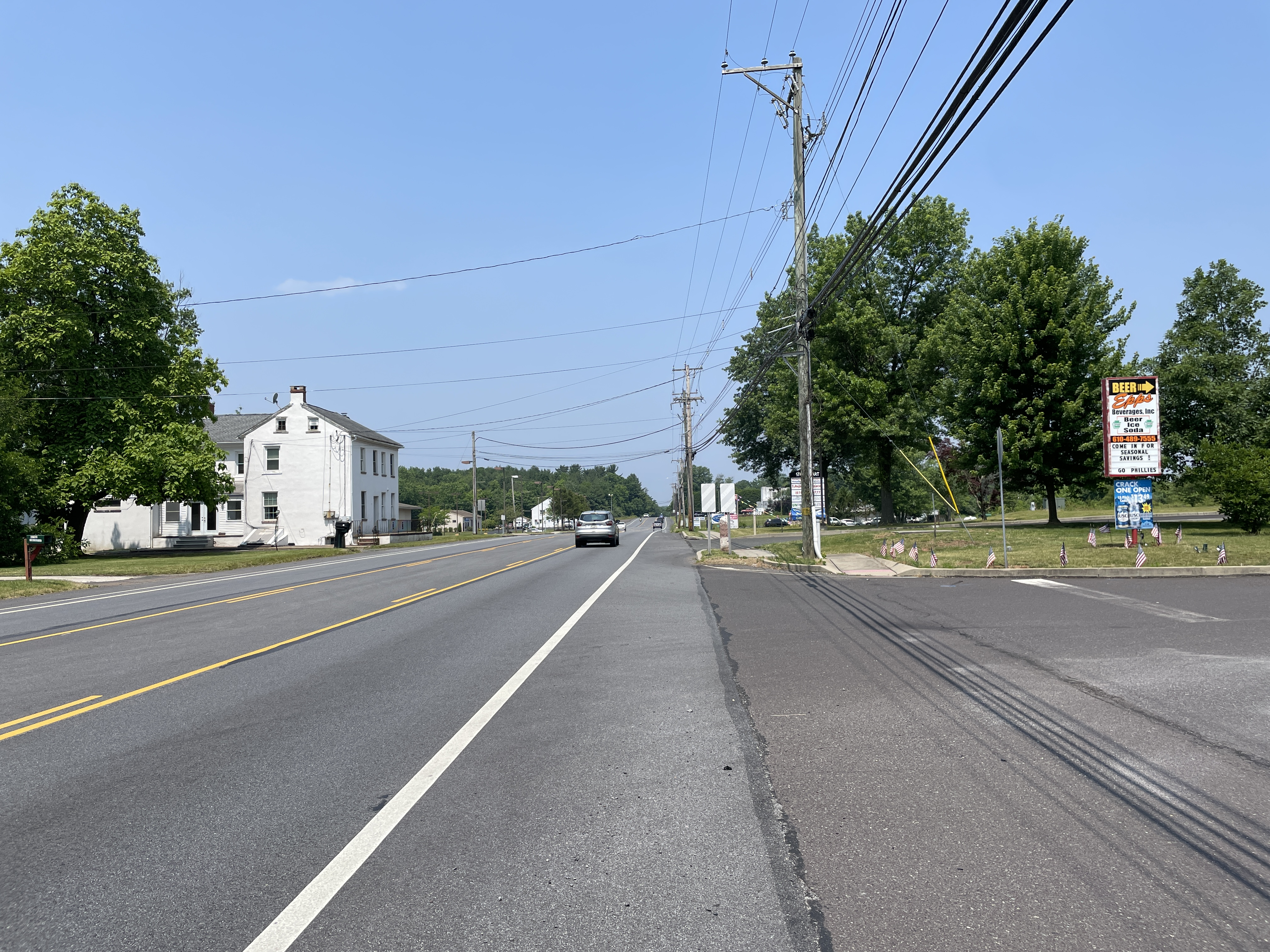
Ridge Pike westbound in Limerick Township

What is now Ridge Pike was originally part of two 19th-century turnpikes. The Perkiomen and Reading Turnpike Company was chartered to build a turnpike from the Perkiomen Bridge in Collegeville northwest to Reading via Trappe and Pottstown. Construction of the Perkiomen and Reading Turnpike began on March 22, 1811, and was completed on November 15, 1815. The Ridge Turnpike Road Company was chartered to build a turnpike from Philadelphia northwest to the Perkiomen Bridge in Collegeville via Norristown. Construction of the Ridge Turnpike began in 1812 and was completed in 1816. The Ridge Turnpike served to transport produce, marble, and lime to Philadelphia along with provide a connection from Philadelphia to Reading and Northumberland.

When Pennsylvania first legislated routes in 1911, the portion of Ridge Pike between Pottstown and Norristown was designated as part of Legislative Route 146. The section of Ridge Pike west of Norristown was designated as US 120 when the U.S. Highway System was created in 1926; US 120 was designated concurrent with PA 13. In 1927, US 422 replaced the US 120/PA 13 designation along the portion of Ridge Pike between Pottstown and Norristown. Ridge Pike was widened to a multilane road by 1940. In the 1930s, US 422 was rerouted to follow Ridge Pike and Ridge Avenue between Church Road in Barren Hill and US 1 Byp./US 13 Byp. (City Line Avenue/East River Drive) and US 309 (Lincoln Drive) in Philadelphia. In the 1940s, US 422 Alt. was designated along Ridge Pike and Ridge Avenue from US 422 (Airy Street) in Norristown east to US 1 Byp./US 13 Byp. and US 309 in Philadelphia, replacing the US 422 designation along the portion of road east of Barren Hill. US 422 switched alignments with US 422 Alt. east of Barren Hill in the 1950s; this resulted in US 422 again being designated along Ridge Pike and Ridge Avenue between Barren Hill and Philadelphia.

In the 1960s, US 422 was realigned off Ridge Pike to follow Germantown Pike from Collegeville east to Philadelphia while US 422 Alt. was decommissioned, leaving Ridge Pike and Ridge Avenue unnumbered between Collegeville and Philadelphia. On May 23, 1984, the American Association of State Highway and Transportation Officials approved realigning US 422 to a freeway alignment between east of Pottstown and US 202 in King of Prussia, removing the US 422 designation from Ridge Pike between Pottstown and Collegeville.

== Major intersections ==
| County | Location | mi | km | Destinations | Notes |
|---|---|---|---|---|---|
| Berks | Amity Township | | | US 422 west (Benjamin Franklin Highway) | Continuation east |
| Montgomery | Pottstown | | | PA 100 south (Pottstown Pike) – Exton, West Chester | Interchange; eastbound exit to PA 100 south and westbound entrance from PA 100 north |
| Montgomery | Limerick Township | | | SR 4046 (Evergreen Road) to US 422 | Interchange; westbound exit and eastbound entrance |
| Montgomery | Trappe | | | PA 113 (3rd Avenue) – Graterford, Phoenixville | |
| Montgomery | Collegeville | | | PA 29 (2nd Avenue) to US 422 – Schwenksville, Phoenixville | |
| Montgomery | Lower Providence Township | | | Germantown Pike east | Western terminus of Germantown Pike; no left turn from Germantown Pike to eastbound Ridge Pike |
| Montgomery | Lower Providence Township | | | PA 363 north (Park Avenue) | West end of PA 363 overlap |
| Montgomery | Lower Providence–West Norriton township line | | | PA 363 south (South Trooper Road) | East end of PA 363 overlap |
| Montgomery | Norristown | | | US 202 south (Markley Street) | |
| Montgomery | Norristown | | | US 202 north (Dekalb Street) | |
| Montgomery | Plymouth Township | | | I-476 (Mid-County Expressway) | I-476 exit 18; no direct access from I-476 south to eastbound Ridge Pike or from westbound Ridge Pike to I-476 north |
| Philadelphia | Philadelphia | | | Henry Avenue south | Interchange; eastbound exit and westbound entrance |
| Philadelphia | Philadelphia | | | Kelly Drive | Interchange |
| Philadelphia | Philadelphia | | | City Avenue to I-76 / US 1 | Interchange |
| Philadelphia | Philadelphia | | | Lincoln Drive | Interchange |
| Philadelphia | Philadelphia | | | US 1 north (Roosevelt Expressway) | Interchange; access to US 1 north and from US 1 south |
| Philadelphia | Philadelphia | | | US 13 north (Hunting Park Avenue) | West end of US 13 overlap |
| Philadelphia | Philadelphia | | | US 13 south (33rd Street) | East end of US 13 overlap |
| Philadelphia | Philadelphia | | | PA 611 (Broad Street) | |
| Philadelphia | Philadelphia | | | Wood Street | Eastern terminus |
1.000 mi = 1.609 km; 1.000 km = 0.621 mi: Concurrency terminus; Incomplete access
