= Kittanning Coals =

Kittanning coals
- Stratigraphic range: Middle Pennsylvanian, Bashkirian–Moscovian transition
- Type: Coal seams
- Unit of: Allegheny Group
- Underlies: Middle Kittanning coal (No. 6)
- Overlies: Lower Kittanning coal (No. 5)
- Thickness: Variable (generally thin to moderate; regionally discontinuous in places)

Lithology
- Primary: Coal
- Other: shale, sandstone, limestone, underclay

Location
- Region: Appalachian Basin (especially Ohio, Pennsylvania, West Virginia, Kentucky, Maryland)
- Country: United States
- Extent: Eastern and southeastern Ohio and adjacent Appalachian Basin

Type section
- Named for: Kittanning, Pennsylvania

The Kittanning coals are coal seams within the Allegheny Group in eastern and southeastern Ohio. In Ohio’s coal numbering system, the Lower Kittanning coal is designated Coal No. 5 and the Middle Kittanning coal is designated Coal No. 6.

The interval between these two coal beds contains a cyclothemic succession of marine and nonmarine sedimentary rocks, including shale, limestone, underclay, and iron-rich layers. Within this interval, the Columbiana Member represents a distinct marine shale and limestone unit. These alternating deposits reflect changing environments between salt marsh conditions and shallow marine incursions during the Pennsylvanian Period.

== History ==
These were and are economically important coal seams in the Appalachia region of Ohio. The Middle Kittanning is at about surface level in the valleys of Monday Creek and Sunday Creek in southeastern Ohio, but become much deeper going east.

Many towns and villages in southeast Ohio grew up around the mining of the Middle Kittanning coal vein. Many of these are known as the "Little Cities of Black Diamonds."

== See also ==
- Coal towns in Ohio
- Coal mining in Appalachia
