= Jeanette Jena =

American journalist

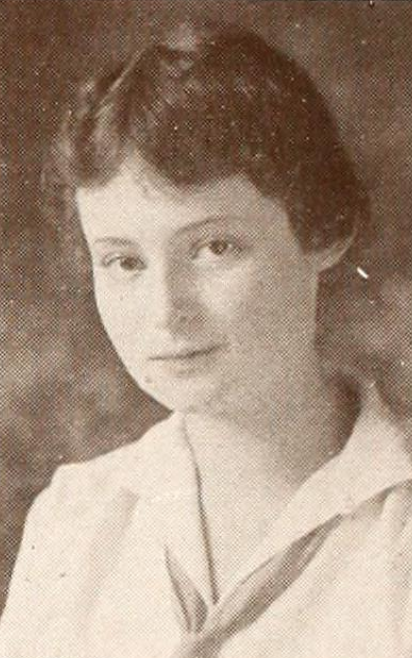
- Jeanette Einstein, later Jena, from the 1917 yearbook of Vassar College
- Born: Jeanette Ruth Einstein; 1896; Kittanning, Pennsylvania, U.S.
- Died: October 10, 1971 (age 75); Pittsburgh, Pennsylvania, U.S.
- Occupations: Journalist, arts patron

Jeanette Ruth Einstein Jena (1896 – October 10, 1971) was an American arts patron and journalist. She was art critic for the Pittsburgh Post-Gazette for over thirty years, from 1935 to 1969.

== Early life and education ==
Einstein was born in Kittanning, Pennsylvania, the daughter of Jacob R. Einstein and Augusta Cohen Einstein. Her family was Jewish; her father was a bank president, and her mother founded "one of the first kindergartens in western Pennsylvania".

Einstein graduated from Vassar College in 1917. She was a member of Phi Beta Kappa.

== Career ==
Jena worked in advertising in Pittsburgh, before moving into journalism by writing book reviews for the Pittsburgh Press in the late 1920s. She became art critic at the Pittsburgh Post-Gazette about 1935. She was "official art critic of the Annual Carnegie International Art Exhibit", and a contributor to The New York Times and The New Yorker magazine.

Jena reviewed the Silver Jubilee show of the Pittsburgh Salon of Photographic Art in 1938. a Van Gogh exhibit in 1943, an exhibit of European armor in 1953, and the annual show of the Pittsburgh Society of Sculptors in 1955. She also reviewed art history books, and helped to edit a cookbook, The Artists' Palate. She retired from the Post-Gazette in 1969. In 1975 she gave an oral history interview to the National Council of Jewish Women.

Jena was a member of the West Penn Hospital Guild, the Pittsburgh Press Club, and the Vassar Club of Pittsburgh, and served on the board of the Pittsburgh Planned Parenthood Association.

== Personal life ==
Einstein married physician and cancer researcher Milton Jena in 1922. She died in 1971, at the age of 75, in Pittsburgh. A sculpture on the grounds of the Pittsburgh Center for the Arts was dedicated as a tribute to Jena.
