= Rural Action =

- Formation: 1991; 35 years ago
- Type: Nonprofit
- Tax ID no.: 31-1124220
- Headquarters: The Plains, Ohio
- Location: United States
- Region served: Ohio
- Board Chair: Sam Miller
- Chief Program Officer: Joe Brehm
- Chief Operations Officer: Bryn Sowash
- Board of directors: Sam Miller, Mike Ford, Billie Kariher, Keith Wilbur, Mary Ann Borch, Lauren Dikis, Sally Linder, Saumya Pant, Yi-Ting Wang, Brian Vadakin, Tom Reed
- Website: https://ruralaction.org
- Formerly called: Appalachian Ohio Public Interest Campaign

Rural Action is a non-governmental organization working in Appalachian Ohio promoting economic, social and environmental justice. The organization envisions a region of clean streams, healthy forests, thriving family farms, meaningful jobs for everyone and lively towns that remember local history and celebrate their stories.

== Programs ==
- Energy Committee: this committee was formed to identify energy consumption and climate issues as the top priorities for the community
- Environmental Education: this team helps younger generations learn about their natural resources, and develops them to use tools given to make rational decisions; It also introduces students to professional paths that lead into a field of natural resources.
- Social Enterprise: helps the community develop projects and connect local chains and people into business opportunities.
- Sustainable Agriculture: strengthens local food systems in Southeast Ohio.
- Sustainable Forestry: works with private landowners, government agencies, and other non-profits to develop sustainable production of forest resources.
- Watershed Restoration: works to improve water quality for communities in the area.
- Zero Waste: promotes the idea of a zero waste economy where natural resources are the main source.

== Projects ==
- Monday Creek Restoration Project, working in the Monday Creek Watershed
- Sunday Creek Watershed Group, working in the Sunday Creek Watershed
- Watershed restoration.

== History ==
The Appalachian Ohio Public Interest Campaign (AOPIC) was founded in 1991 working in environmental advocacy as a citizen action organization. In 1992, AOPIC was reorganized as Rural Action, changing its focus to regional revitalization and as a member based organization. In 1994, Rural Action began an AmeriCorps* VISTA program to build capacity. This program is one of the largest rural developmental programs in the country. It has engaged more than 360 volunteers to help the communities in Appalachian, Ohio and was hosted until 2009. Since then, Rural Action has continued its tradition as a supporter of national service through the Ohio Stream Restore Corps, an AmeriCorps program of 14 members across six watersheds working on reclamation, water quality monitoring, environmental education, trail access, and waste and recycling. Michelle Decker is the current CEO of Rural Action. The last longterm Executive Director, and the first one, was Athens County social justice activist, Carol Kuhre. She is also a founding member of the organization.

== Awards ==
- The Ohio Department of Natural Resources (Division of Mineral Resources Management) presented Rural Action's Monday Creek Restoration Project with its "Minerals Education Award" and "Conservation Achievement of the Year Award" in 2004.
- The Ohio Department of Natural Resources (Division of Mineral Resources Management) presented the Huff Run Watershed Restoration Partnership (which Rural Action sponsors) with its "Minerals Education Award" and its " Excellence in Abandoned Mine Land Reclamation" in 2006.

== Funding ==
There are 18 organizations that fund Rural Action, since they are member based. They include: Athens Foundation, Central Appalachian Network, Earthshare of Ohio, Epstein/Teicher Foundation, Ford Foundation, Grant Foundation, Muskingum Watershed Conservancy District, North Central Sustainable Agriculture Research & Education, Ohio Department of Natural Resources, Ohio State University, One Foundation, Serve Ohio AmeriCorps, Sisters of Saint Joseph Foundation, Sugarbush Foundation, University of Kentucky, US Department of Agriculture, US Department of Interior Office of Surface Mining, and the US Forest Endowment. There are also three membership levels to subscribe to in order to donate to the organization.

== Partnerships ==
Rural Action has partnered with hundred of community organizations, state and federal agencies, and small groups of community driven citizens. They all play a role in creating an outcome for a sustainable community.
