= Monday Creek =

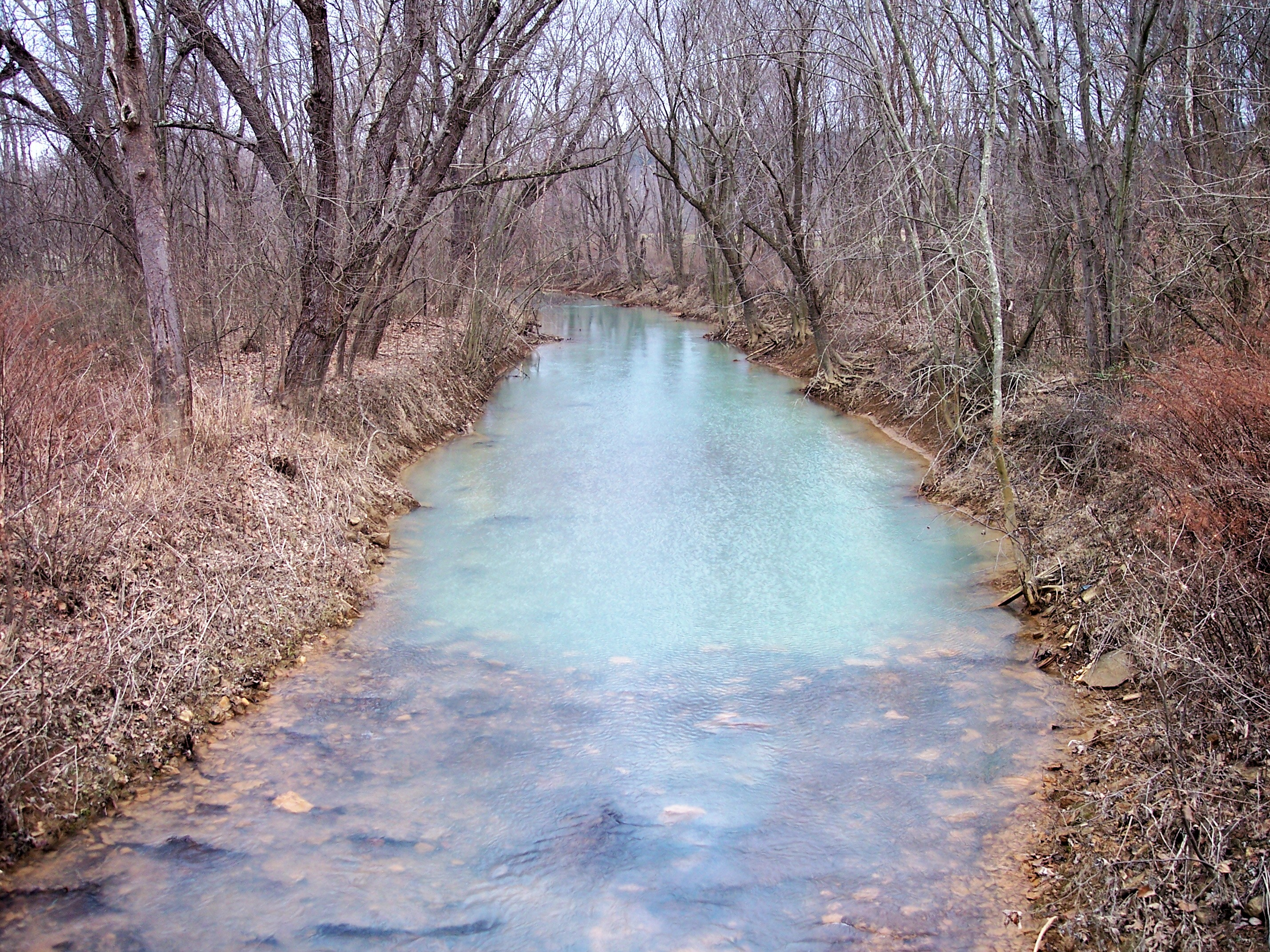
- Monday Creek near Nelsonville in 2006

Location
- Country: United States
- State: Ohio
- Counties: Perry, Hocking, Athens

Physical characteristics
- Source
  - location: Perry County, Ohio, approximately 2 mi (3 km) north of Shawnee
  - coordinates: 39°37′48″N 82°11′54″W
  - elevation: Approx. 820 ft (250 m)
- Mouth
  - location: Hocking River in Athens County, Ohio, approximately 2 mi (3.2 km) southeast of Nelsonville
  - coordinates: 39°25′01″N 82°11′34″W
  - elevation: 659 ft (201 m)
- Length: 27.0 mi (43.5 km)
- Basin size: 116 mi^{2} (300 km^{2})
- Discharge
  - location: Doanville
  - average: 126.27 cu ft/s (3.576 m^{3}/s), USGS water years 1998-2015

Monday Creek is a tributary of the Hocking River, 27 miles (43 km) long, in southeastern Ohio in the United States. Via the Hocking and Ohio Rivers, it is part of the watershed of the Mississippi River, draining an area of 116 square miles (300 km^{2}) on the unglaciated portion of the Allegheny Plateau. Monday Creek has been badly affected by acid mine drainage.

== Course and watershed ==
Monday Creek rises north of Shawnee in southern Perry County, and flows generally southwardly through northeastern Hocking County and northwestern Athens County, passing through the eastern part of Nelsonville to its confluence with the Hocking River about 2 miles (3.2 km) southeast of that city. Its largest tributaries are Little Monday Creek, 14.3 miles (23.0 km) long, which flows through Perry and Hocking Counties, and the Snow Fork, 10.7 miles (17.2 km) long, which rises in Perry County and flows through Hocking and Athens Counties, through the communities of Murray City and Buchtel.

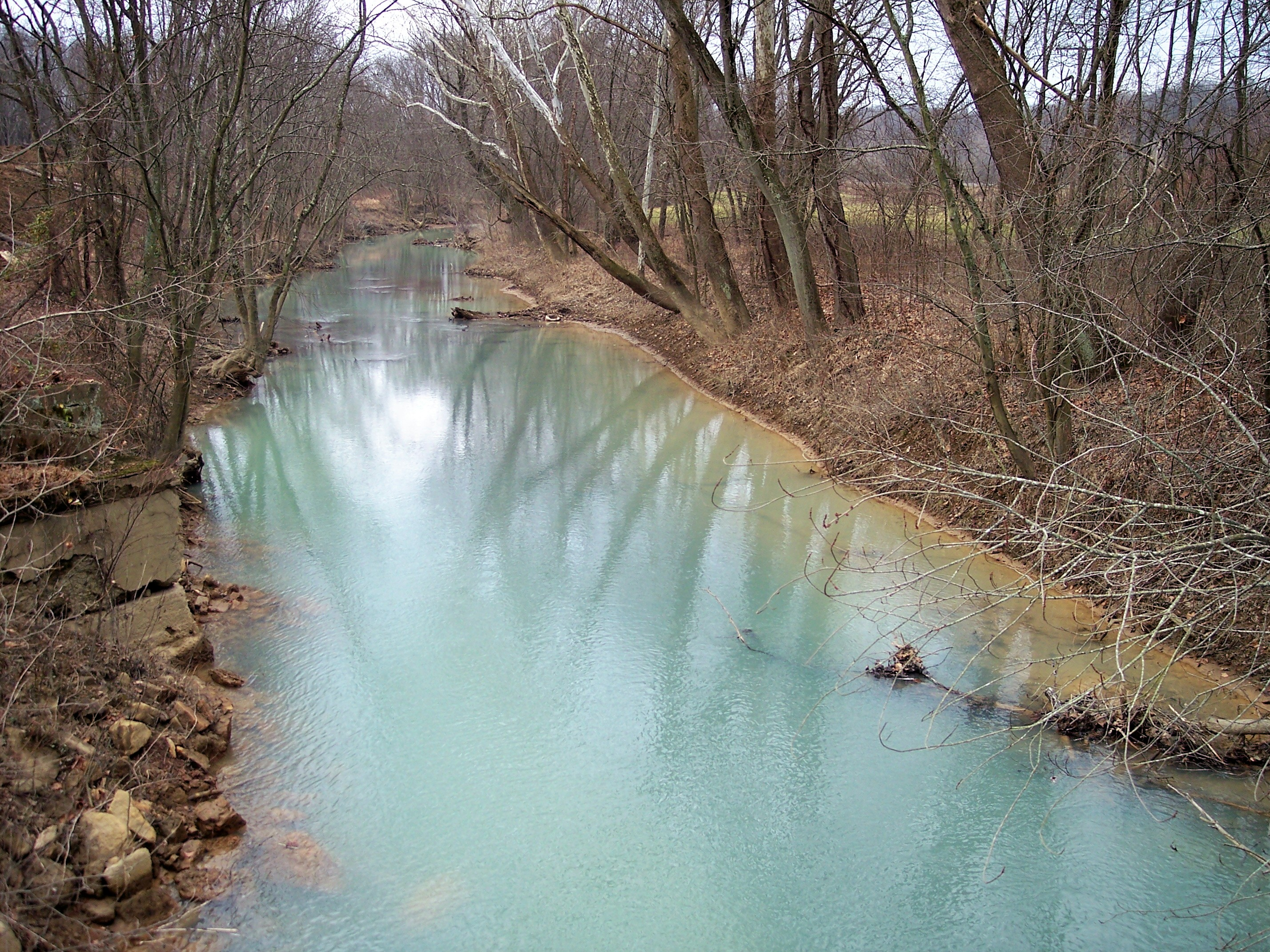
Monday Creek near Nelsonville in 2006

As of 1994, land use in the Monday Creek watershed was occupied this way:

- Forest, 87%
- Surface mining, 5%
- Cropland, 3%
- Wetlands, 2%
- Grazing and pasture, 1% each
- Urban, 1%

The Wayne National Forest owns 38% of land in the watershed; the largest private landowner is the Sunday Creek Mining Company.

== History ==
The Adena, who lived in the region around 1000 BC, were the earliest known inhabitants of the Monday Creek area. Later native people of the region included the Lenape, Shawnee and Wyandot. According to legend, early European explorers of the region named the stream for the day on which it was discovered. The previous day the explorers had similarly named nearby Sunday Creek. The earliest white settlements in the area date to 1774; the Ohio Company purchased all the land in the watershed in two installments in 1787 and 1792.

The aggressive pursuit of natural resources, including coal, timber, salt, iron, and clay took its toll on the watershed from the mid-19th century until well into the 20th century. Iron production in the area aided the North during the Civil War. As much as 89% of the Monday Creek watershed was deforested by 1885, with replanting beginning with the establishment of the Wayne National Forest in 1935. Salt mining occurred in the watershed in the 19th century; clay brick production peaked in the early 20th century; oil and natural gas production began in 1909.

The earliest coal mines in the watershed can be traced to the 1860s. Early mines were underground, a practice which was in sharp decline by the 1920s and had ended completely in the watershed by 1991. Surface mining was begun post-World War II and declined in the 1970s. Coal in the watershed is primarily of the Middle Kittaning #6 variety, which is high in sulfur and has been identified by the Ohio EPA as having a high potential for pollution.

The Ohio Environmental Protection Agency has identified Monday Creek as having been "irretrievably altered to the extent that no appreciable aquatic life can be supported" due to severe contamination by acid mine drainage.

The Monday Creek Restoration Project, sponsored by Rural Action, has been working since 1994 to address water quality issues in the Monday Creek watershed.

== See also ==
- List of rivers of Ohio
- Sunday Creek (Ohio)
