= Germantown Pike =

Route information
- Maintained by PennDOT, Montgomery County, and City of Philadelphia
- Existed: 1687–present

Major junctions
- West end: Ridge Pike near Collegeville
- PA 363 in Fairview Village; US 202 in East Norriton Township; I-276 / I-476 / Penna Turnpike in Plymouth Meeting; US 13 in Philadelphia; PA 611 in Philadelphia
- East end: Front Street / Laurel Street in Philadelphia

Location
- Country: United States
- State: Pennsylvania
- Counties: Montgomery, Philadelphia

Highway system
- Pennsylvania State Route System; Interstate; US; State; Scenic; Legislative

Germantown Pike (also known as Germantown Avenue for a portion of its length) is a historic road in Pennsylvania that opened in 1687, running from Philadelphia northwest to Collegeville. The road is particularly notable for the "imposing mansions" that existed in the Germantown neighborhood in Philadelphia. The road was left in ruins after the British destroyed it in the Revolutionary War during the 1777 Battle of Germantown, and was not rebuilt until 1809. Portions of Germantown Pike were signed as U.S. Route 422 (US 422) before the latter was rerouted along a freeway alignment to King of Prussia.

== Route description ==
=== Montgomery County ===
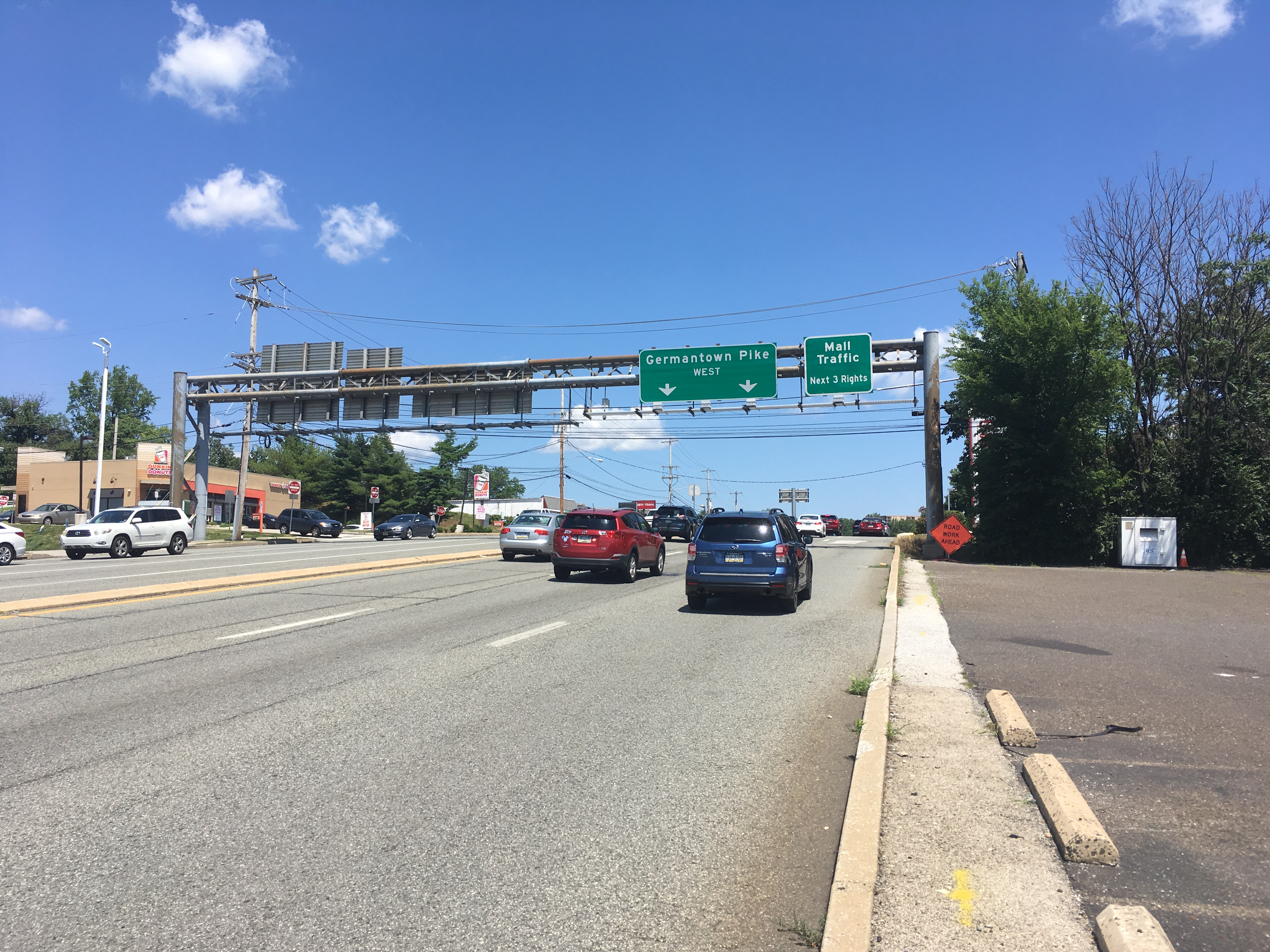
Germantown Pike westbound in Plymouth Meeting

Germantown Pike begins at an intersection with Ridge Pike in Lower Providence Township, Montgomery County a short distance east of the Perkiomen Bridge that carries Ridge Pike over the Perkiomen Creek into the borough of Collegeville. From here, Germantown Pike heads east as a two-lane undivided county road, passing a mix of fields and commercial development as it passes south of a factory. The road passes a mix of homes and businesses in the community of Evansburg before it heads into forested areas of Evansburg State Park and crosses Skippack Creek. Germantown Pike curves to the southeast and becomes the border between Lower Providence Township to the southwest and Skippack Township to the northeast as it leaves the state park and passes through the community of Providence Square. At this point, the road becomes the border between Lower Providence Township to the southwest and Worcester Township to the northeast before curving east-southeast to fully enter Worcester Township. Germantown Pike passes through a mix of farm fields and wooded residential areas, heading to the south of Methacton High School. The road turns to the southeast and passes through wooded suburban neighborhoods before coming to an intersection with Pennsylvania Route 363 (PA 363) in a commercial area in the community of Fairview Village. Germantown Pike continues through a mix of residential and commercial development as it descends a hill and gains a second westbound lane. Upon crossing Trooper Road, the roadway enters East Norriton Township and turns into a three-lane road with a center left-turn lane, passing more suburban development. The road curves to the east-southeast and becomes a two-lane road. After crossing Whitehall Road, Germantown Pike becomes a five-lane road with a center left-turn lane and passes between Jefferson Einstein Montgomery Hospital to the north and Norristown Farm Park to the south. The road loses the center turn lane heads into residential areas with some commercial establishments, crossing CSX's Stony Creek Branch railroad line at-grade. Germantown Pike becomes a four-lane divided highway and passes businesses, crossing Swede Road in the community of Penn Square. The road continues southeast through commercial areas and comes to an intersection with US 202. Past the US 202 intersection, Germantown Pike becomes undivided and heads past more businesses, gaining a center left-turn lane as it passes southwest of an office park.

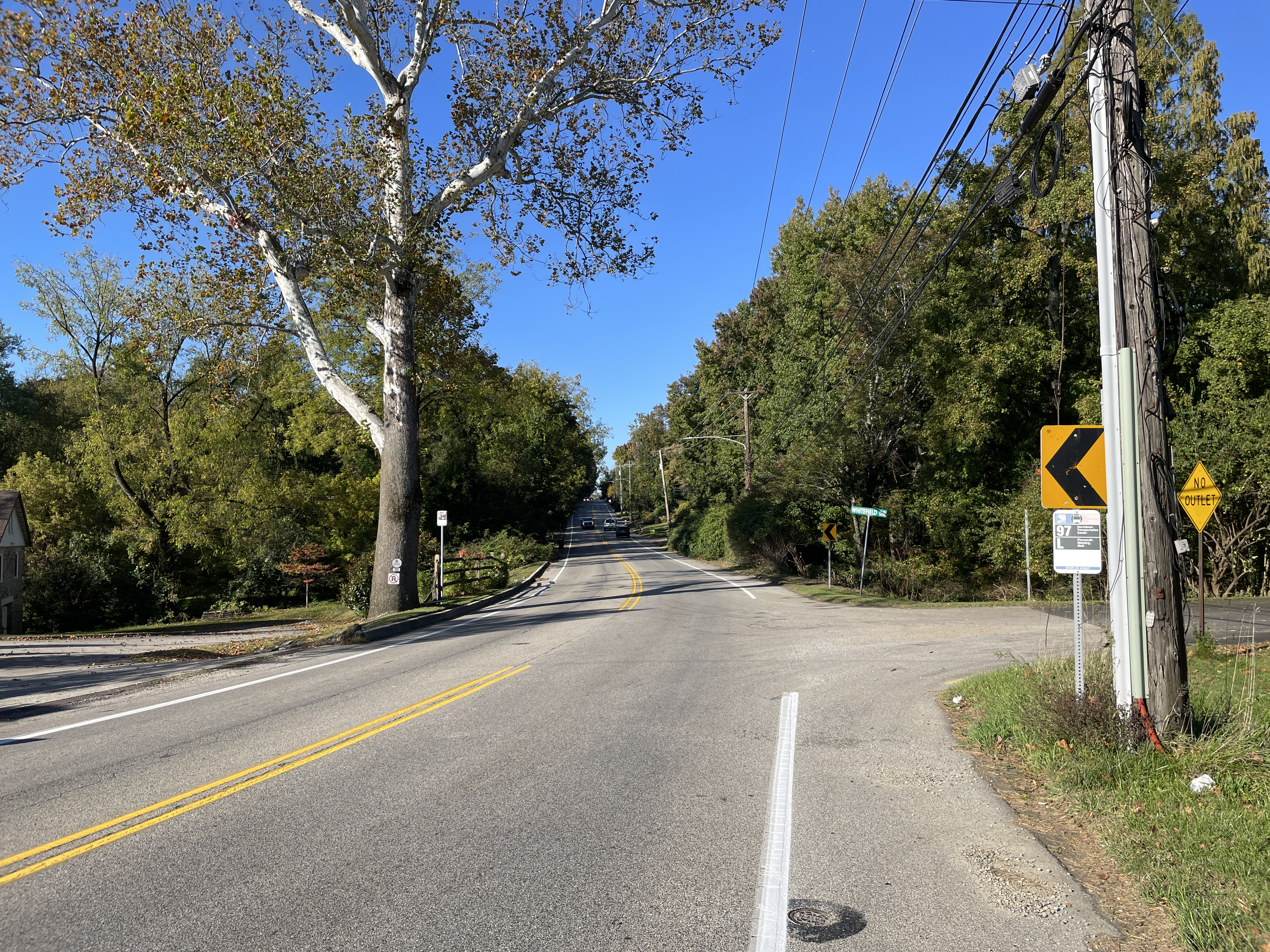
Germantown Pike westbound in Whitemarsh Township

Upon crossing Arch Road, Germantown Pike enters Plymouth Township and becomes a four-lane undivided road, heading southeast through suburban residential areas and passing through the community of Plymouth Valley. The road turns south and then southeast as it passes homes and some commercial establishments, becoming a four-lane divided highway as it comes to an intersection with Sandy Hill Road to the southwest of Villanova Ballpark at Plymouth. At this point, Germantown Pike becomes State Route 3053 (SR 3053), an unsigned quadrant route. Germantown Pike turns into a five-lane road with a center left-turn lane and heads south through commercial areas. Past the Hickory Road intersection, the road becomes a six-lane divided highway and passes businesses as it heads to the west of the Plymouth Meeting Mall. Germantown Pike crosses Plymouth Road in the community of Hickorytown and reaches the Mid-County Interchange, where it comes to the Norristown interchange with the Pennsylvania Turnpike (Interstate 276, I-276) that also provides access to northbound I-476 (Pennsylvania Turnpike Northeast Extension) before a partial interchange with I-476 that provides access to southbound I-476 and access from northbound I-476. Following this, Germantown Pike becomes a four-lane divided highway and passes under Norfolk Southern's Morrisville Line before it heads into commercial areas, narrowing to a two-lane undivided road at the Chemical Road intersection. The road turns southeast and comes to an offset junction with Butler Pike near the Plymouth Friends Meetinghouse in the community of Plymouth Meeting. Past here, Germantown Pike heads into Whitemarsh Township and runs through suburban residential areas with some businesses, passing southwest of Plymouth-Whitemarsh High School before heading to the northeast of a golf course. The road crosses Joshua Road in the community of Lafayette Hill and continues past a mix of homes and businesses. Germantown Pike makes a turn to the east at the Church Road intersection and heads through wooded residential areas, crossing into Springfield Township and curving southeast after passing south of a golf course.

=== Philadelphia County ===
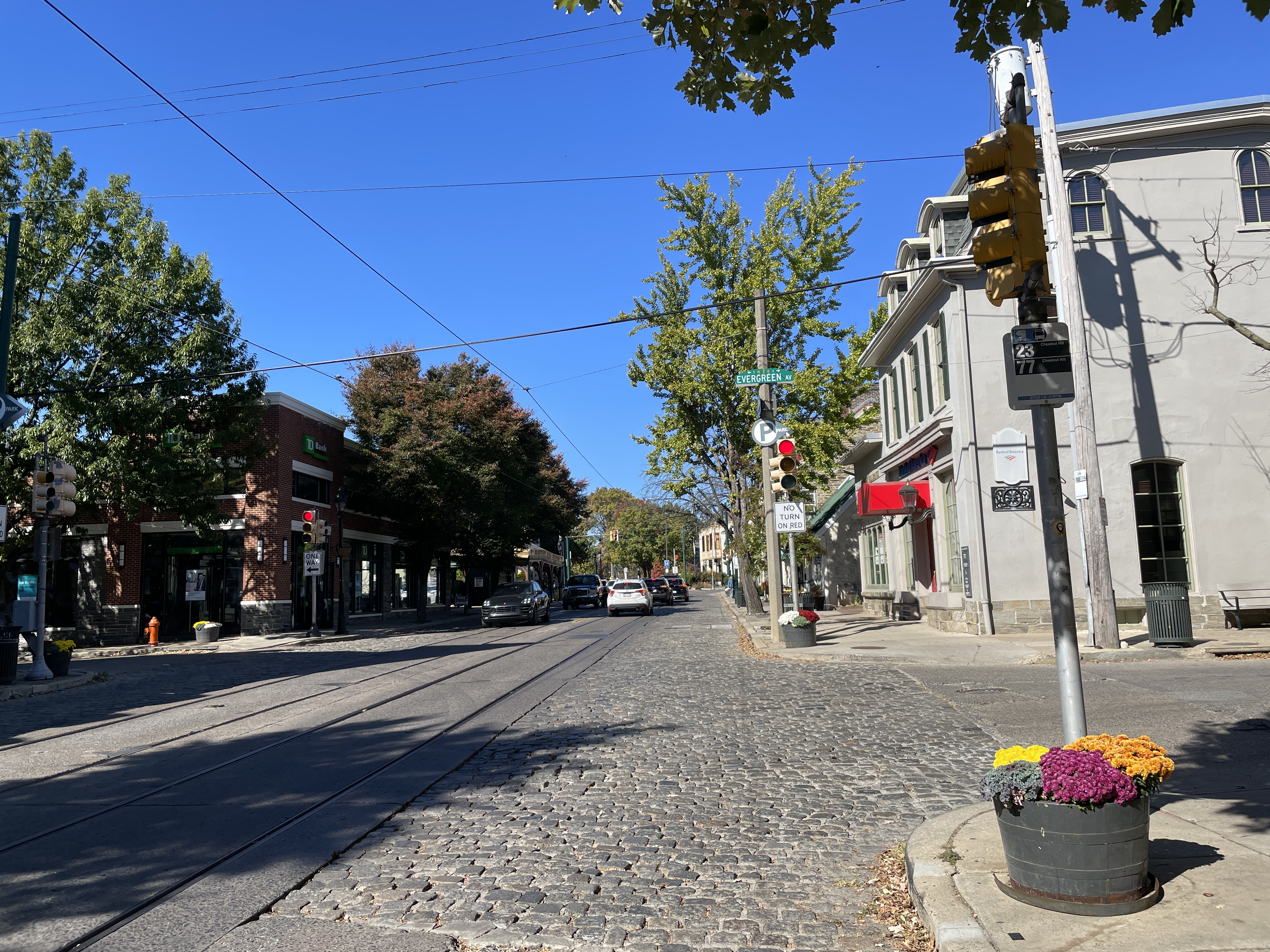
Germantown Avenue northbound in the Chestnut Hill neighborhood of Philadelphia

Upon crossing Northwestern Avenue, SR 3053 ends and the road heads into the city of Philadelphia in Philadelphia County as Germantown Avenue, a two-lane undivided city street. The road heads into the Chestnut Hill neighborhood and passes southwest of Chestnut Hill College before heading into forested areas of Wissahickon Valley Park and crossing Wissahickon Creek. Germantown Avenue curves east and continues through wooded areas, passing to the south of Morris Arboretum. The road turns southeast and gains a second eastbound lane as it heads southwest of the Woodmere Art Museum, narrowing to two lanes at the Bells Mill Road intersection. Germantown Avenue runs through wooded residential areas and passes to the southwest of Chestnut Hill Hospital. The road heads into the downtown area of Chestnut Hill and passes south of SEPTA's Chestnut Hill Bus Loop, where Germantown Avenue becomes surfaced with sett and the unused tracks of SEPTA's former Route 23 trolley (now a bus route) begin to follow the road. Germantown Avenue comes to an intersection with the southern terminus of Bethlehem Pike, where it becomes part of SR 4007. The road passes to the north of Chestnut Hill West station, which serves as the terminus of SEPTA's Chestnut Hill West Line, and continues southeast through downtown Chestnut Hill. Germantown Avenue crosses Cresheim Creek and passes under an abandoned railroad line in a wooded area. From here, Germantown Avenue heads into the Mount Airy neighborhood, where it passes a mix of homes and businesses in the neighborhood. Farther southeast, the road comes to an intersection with Washington Lane, where SR 4007 splits southwest along Washington Lane and Germantown Avenue becomes SR 4005. Germantown Avenue continues into the Germantown neighborhood and passes more urban residential and commercial development, heading through the downtown area of Germantown at the Chelten Avenue intersection. From here, the road continues southeast through more urban areas in the Germantown neighborhood.

Germantown Avenue curves south and passes under SEPTA's Chestnut Hill East Line and Main Line and over CSX's Trenton Subdivision railroad line northeast of the Wayne Junction station serving the SEPTA lines. From here, the sett surface ends and road heads into the Nicetown–Tioga neighborhood, passing urban areas of homes and businesses and crossing under US 1 (Roosevelt Expressway). Germantown Avenue runs through urban development and passes over Conrail Shared Assets Operations' Richmond Industrial Track immediately before coming to an intersection with US 13 (Hunting Park Avenue). The road continues southeast and reaches an intersection with PA 611 (Broad Street) and Erie Avenue. From here, Germantown Avenue becomes a city street that runs south-southeast through urban areas of homes and businesses, passing to the east of Temple University Hospital and intersecting the southern terminus of Old York Road. The road passes under Amtrak's Northeast Corridor railroad line and heads into the Fairhill neighborhood, where it curves to the south. Germantown Avenue turns to the southeast and the former Route 23 trolley tracks split to the south to follow 10th and 11th streets. The road continues southeast through urban areas as a two-lane street, where Germantown Avenue becomes discontinuous between Norris Street and Berks Street due to a shopping center. From here, Germantown Avenue resumes and runs south-southeast through urban residential and commercial areas, crossing Cecil B. Moore Avenue. The road becomes one-way westbound between 4th Street and Thompson Street. Germantown Avenue becomes two-way again and heads into the Fishtown neighborhood. Here, the road crosses Girard Avenue, which carries SEPTA's Route 15 trolley line. Following this, Germantown Avenue continues southeast past urban development and reaches its terminus at an intersection with Front Street and Laurel Street underneath I-95 and SEPTA's Market–Frankford Line.

== History ==
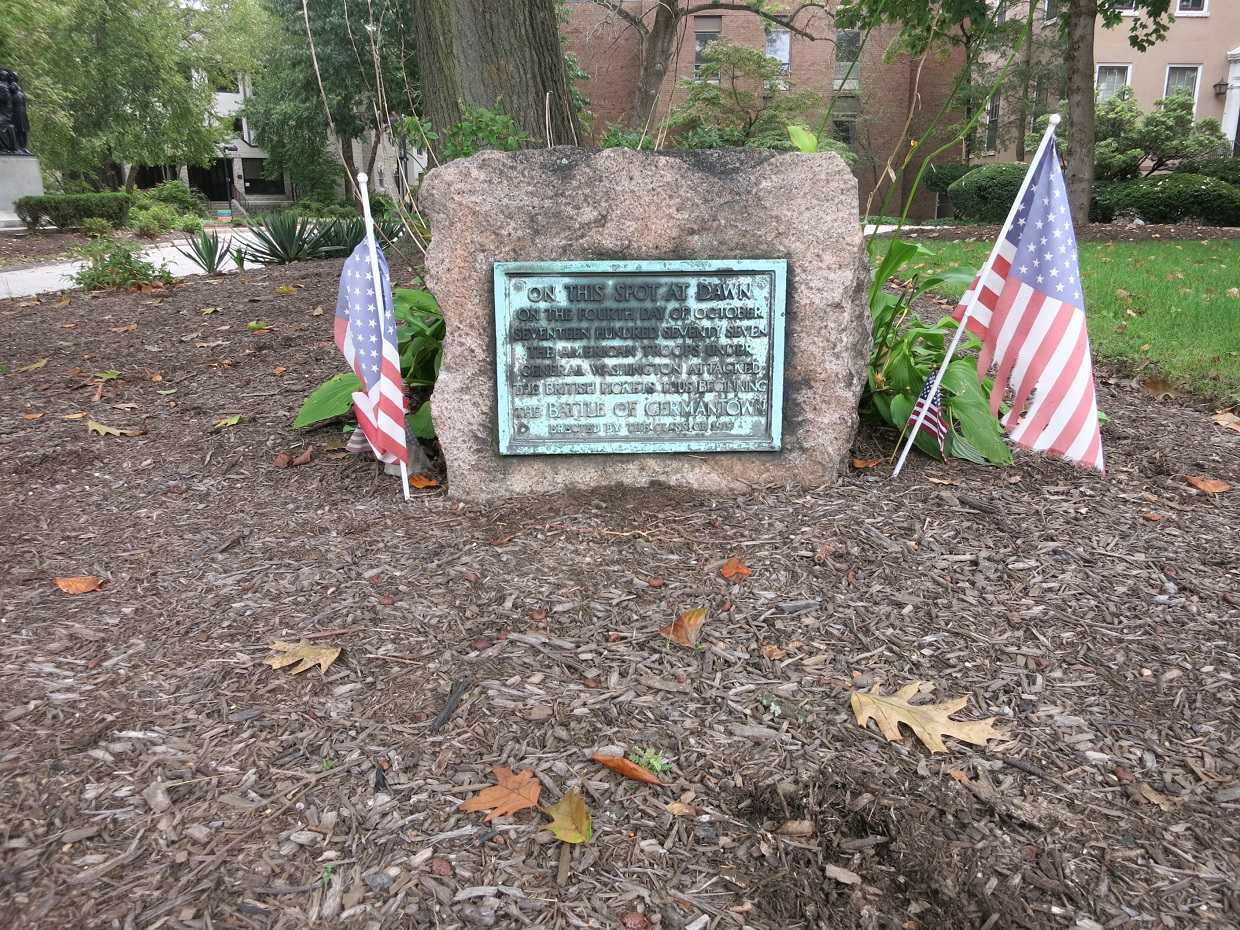
Battle marker at the Lutheran Seminary on Germantown Avenue

What is now Germantown Pike was originally a cart road dating back to 1687 that ran from Philadelphia northwest to Germantown and Plymouth Meeting. The Germantown Pike was built as a turnpike by the Germantown and Perkiomen Turnpike Company, with construction on the road beginning in 1801. The turnpike began at 3rd and Vine streets in Philadelphia and continued northwest to the east end of the Perkiomen Bridge in Collegeville, with milestones making the distance from Philadelphia along the road. The Germantown and Perkiomen Turnpike Company completed construction of the road in 1804. In 1870, the Germantown and Perkiomen Turnpike Company was taken over by the city of Philadelphia and the tolls were removed.

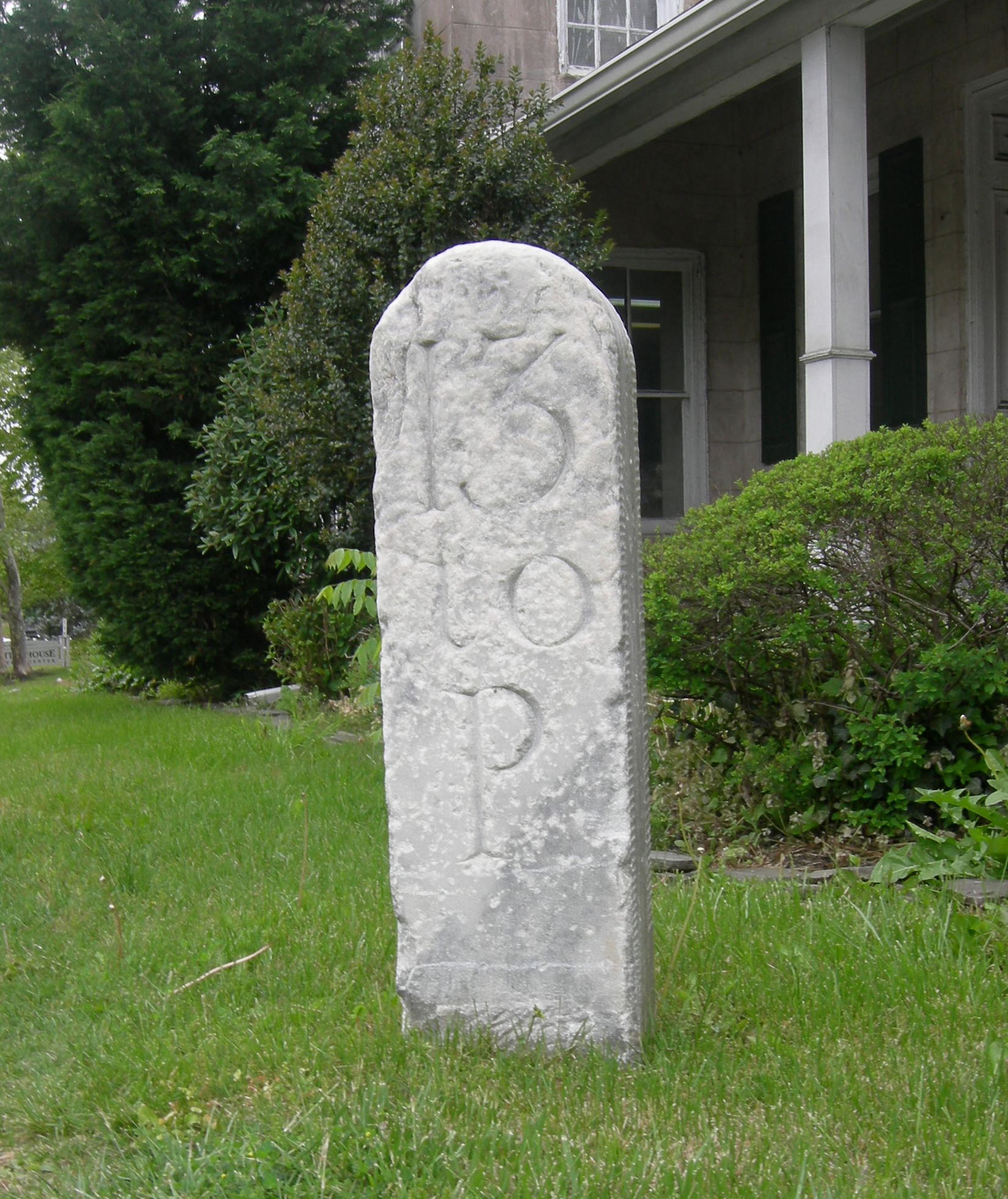
Milestone along the Germantown Pike in Plymouth Meeting

When Pennsylvania first legislated routes in 1911, the portion of Germantown Pike between Sandy Hill Road in Plymouth Meeting and Philadelphia was designated as Legislative Route 145. The portion of Germantown Pike from Sandy Hill Road to Philadelphia was designated as US 120 when the U.S. Highway System was created in 1926; US 120 was designated concurrent with PA 13. In 1927, US 422 replaced the US 120/PA 13 designation along this stretch of Germantown Pike. In the 1930s, Germantown Pike and Germantown Avenue between Church Road in Barren Hill and Chew Street in Philadelphia was signed as part of US 422 Byp. while US 309 was cosigned with US 422 Byp. along Germantown Avenue in Philadelphia between Bethlehem Pike and Allens Lane. Germantown Pike was widened to a multilane road between Barren Hill and Philadelphia during the 1940s. In the 1940s, US 422 replaced the US 422 Byp. designation along the road while US 309 Truck was designated onto Germantown Avenue in Philadelphia between US 309 (Allens Lane) and US 1 Byp./US 13 Byp. (Hunting Park Avenue). In the 1950s, US 309 was realigned off Germantown Avenue, the US 309 Truck designation was removed, and US 422 switched alignments with US 422 Alt. east of Barren Hill; this resulted in US 422 Alt. being designated along Germantown Pike and Germantown Avenue between Church Road in Barren Hill and Washington Lane in Philadelphia.

In the 1960s, US 422 was realigned to follow Germantown Pike and Germantown Avenue between Ridge Pike near Collegeville and Washington Lane in Philadelphia. The route was realigned off its former alignment through Norristown along Ridge Pike, Airy Street, and Sandy Hill Road and was realigned off Ridge Pike and Ridge Avenue into Philadelphia, replacing the US 422 Alt. designation. On May 23, 1984, the American Association of State Highway and Transportation Officials approved realigning US 422 to a freeway alignment between east of Pottstown and US 202 in King of Prussia, removing the US 422 designation from Germantown Pike and Germantown Avenue.

== Major intersections ==
County	Location	mi	km	Destinations	Notes
Montgomery	Lower Providence Township			Ridge Pike (SR 4031 west)	Western terminus
Montgomery	Worcester Township			PA 363 (Valley Forge Road / North Park Avenue)	
Montgomery	East Norriton Township			US 202 (Dekalb Pike)	
Montgomery	Plymouth Township			I-276 / I-476 / Penna Turnpike – Harrisburg, New Jersey, Chester	No westbound access to I-476 south; exit 333 on I-276 / Turnpike; exit 20 on I-476
Philadelphia	Philadelphia			Bethlehem Pike (SR 4007 north)	
Philadelphia	Philadelphia			US 13 (West Hunting Park Avenue)	
Philadelphia	Philadelphia			PA 611 (North Broad Street)	
Philadelphia	Philadelphia			Front Street / Laurel Street	Eastern terminus
1.000 mi = 1.609 km; 1.000 km = 0.621 mi: Incomplete access
