= Little Cities of Black Diamonds =

The Little Cities of Black Diamonds are the historic coal town mining communities of the Appalachia region in southeast Ohio.

== Communities ==
Some Black Diamonds communities include:

- Buchtel, Ohio
- Carbondale, Ohio
- Carbon Hill, Ohio
- Corning, Ohio
- Diamond, Ohio
- Glouster, Ohio
- Hemlock, Ohio
- Murray City, Ohio
- Nelsonville, Ohio
- New Straitsville, Ohio
- Shawnee, Perry County, Ohio
- Trimble, Ohio

== Culture ==
Sunday Creek Associates, a nonprofit organization located in Shawnee, Ohio. It is responsible for a community building experience named "Little Cities of Black Diamonds." It includes organizing local history bus tours, the Little Cities of the Forest, the Little Cities Archives, the Little Cities of Black Diamonds Day, and the Appalachian Spring Festival.

== See also ==
- Coal towns in Ohio
- Coal mining in Appalachia
- Appalachian culture in Ohio
