= Kittanning Citizens Bridge =

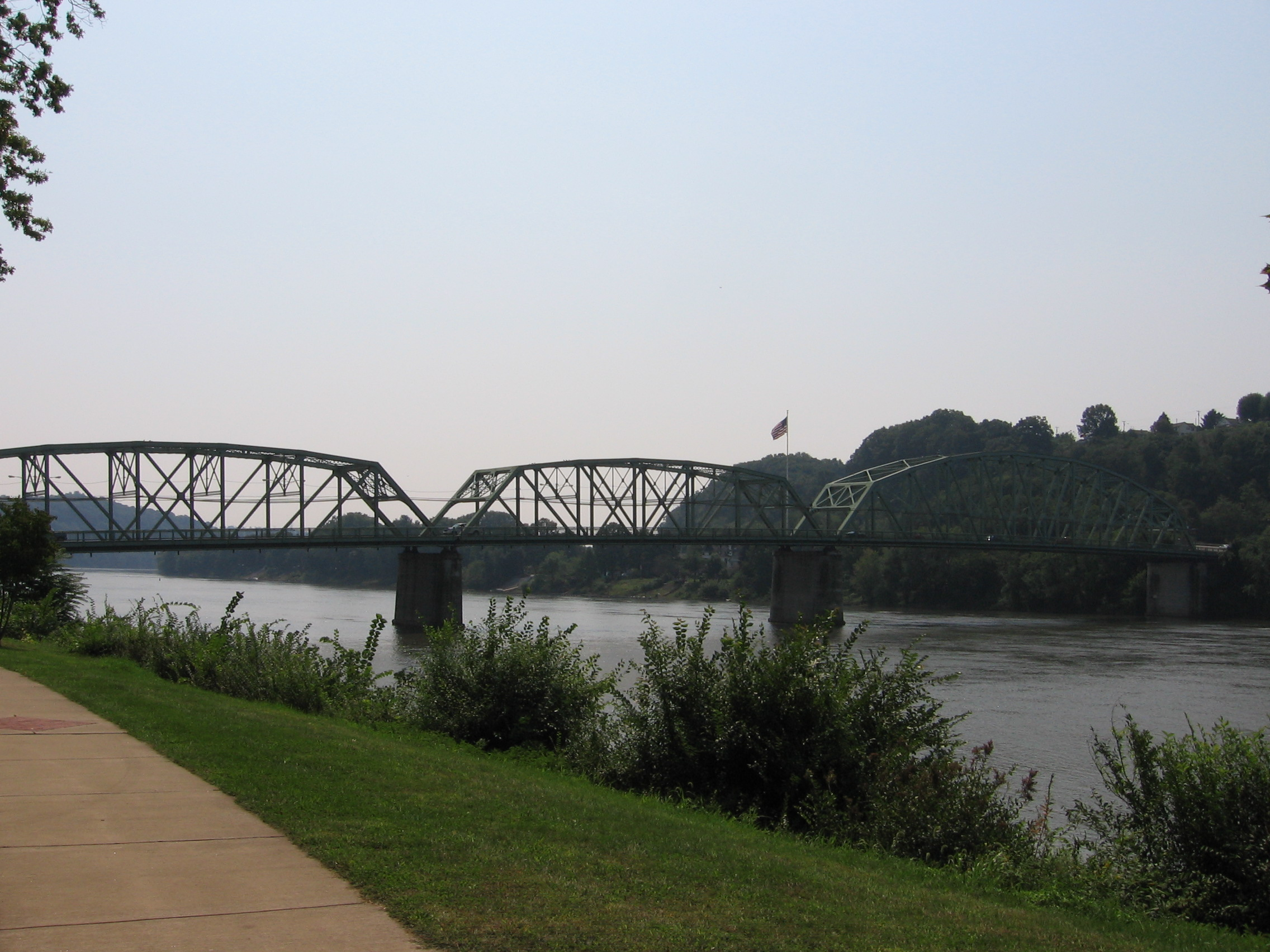
- Coordinates: 40°48′45″N 79°31′21″W
- Carries: 2 lanes of US 422 Bus., pedestrians
- Crosses: Allegheny River
- Locale: Kittanning and West Kittanning, Pennsylvania

Characteristics
- Design: Truss bridge
- Total length: 949 feet (289 m)
- Clearance below: 47 feet (14.3 m)

History
- Opened: 1932

Location
- Interactive map of Kittanning Citizens Bridge

The Kittanning Citizens Bridge is a through truss bridge spanning the Allegheny River at Kittanning in the U.S. state of Pennsylvania. Constructed in 1932, the bridge carries vehicles and pedestrians between Kittanning and West Kittanning.

The bridge is 949 feet (289 m) in length and has three main spans. Deck width is 16.3 feet (5.0 m) and navigational clearance beneath is 47 feet (14.3 m).

The bridge has appeared in several feature films. It was used as a backdrop and later in the climax scene of the 2002 horror film, The Mothman Prophecies. It was intended to represent the famous Silver Bridge in Point Pleasant, West Virginia, which collapsed in 1967. This is despite the fact that Silver Bridge was a suspension bridge and not a through truss bridge. Effects were used to add piers and suspension cables to Kittanning Citizens Bridge, although it is clearly still a through truss bridge in the film.

It was also filmed for the opening credits of the 2012 movie One for the Money, and is shown briefly in the 2009 film The Hole. Also seen in the 2009 film My Bloody Valentine.

== See also ==
- List of crossings of the Allegheny River
