= Barren Hill, Pennsylvania =

Unincorporated community in Pennsylvania, US

Barren Hill
- Unincorporated community
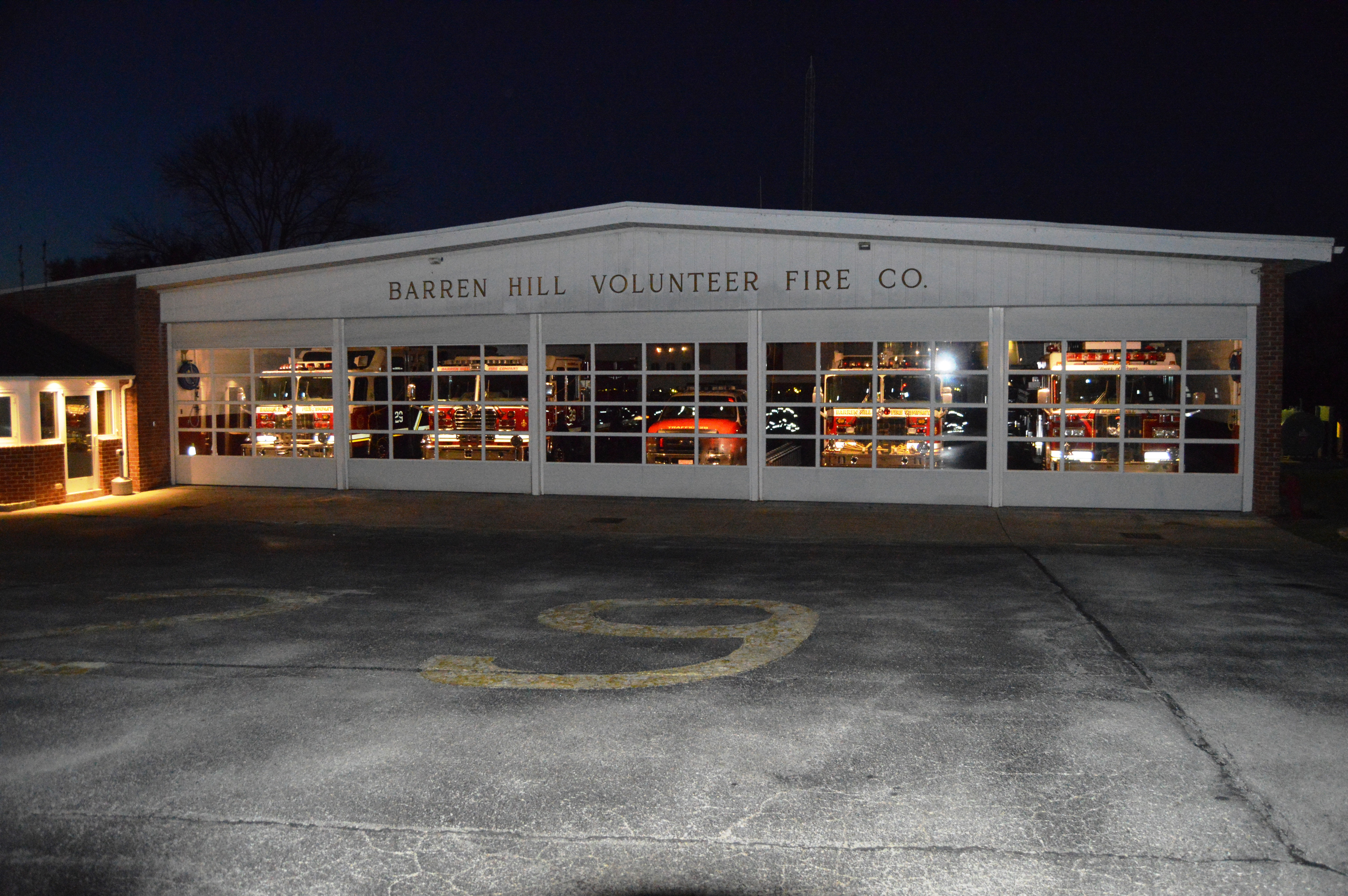
- The Barren Hill fire station in April 2015

- Location of Barren Hill in Pennsylvania Barren Hill (the United States)
- Coordinates: 40°05′14″N 75°15′47″W
- Country: United States
- State: Pennsylvania
- County: Montgomery
- Township: Whitemarsh
- Elevation: 190 ft (58 m)
- Time zone: UTC-5 (EST)
  - Summer (DST): UTC-4 (EDT)
- Area code: 610
- Website: www.whitemarshtwp.org

Barren Hill is an unincorporated community in Whitemarsh Township, Montgomery County in the Commonwealth of Pennsylvania, United States. It was first settled in the 18th century.

== Etymology ==
The origin of the town's name is uncertain. While probably a corruption of Barn Hill, it might refer to the sheer barren areas in the community.
