= Lincoln Drive =

Road in Pennsylvania, US

Coordinates: 40.03760°N 75.19115°W

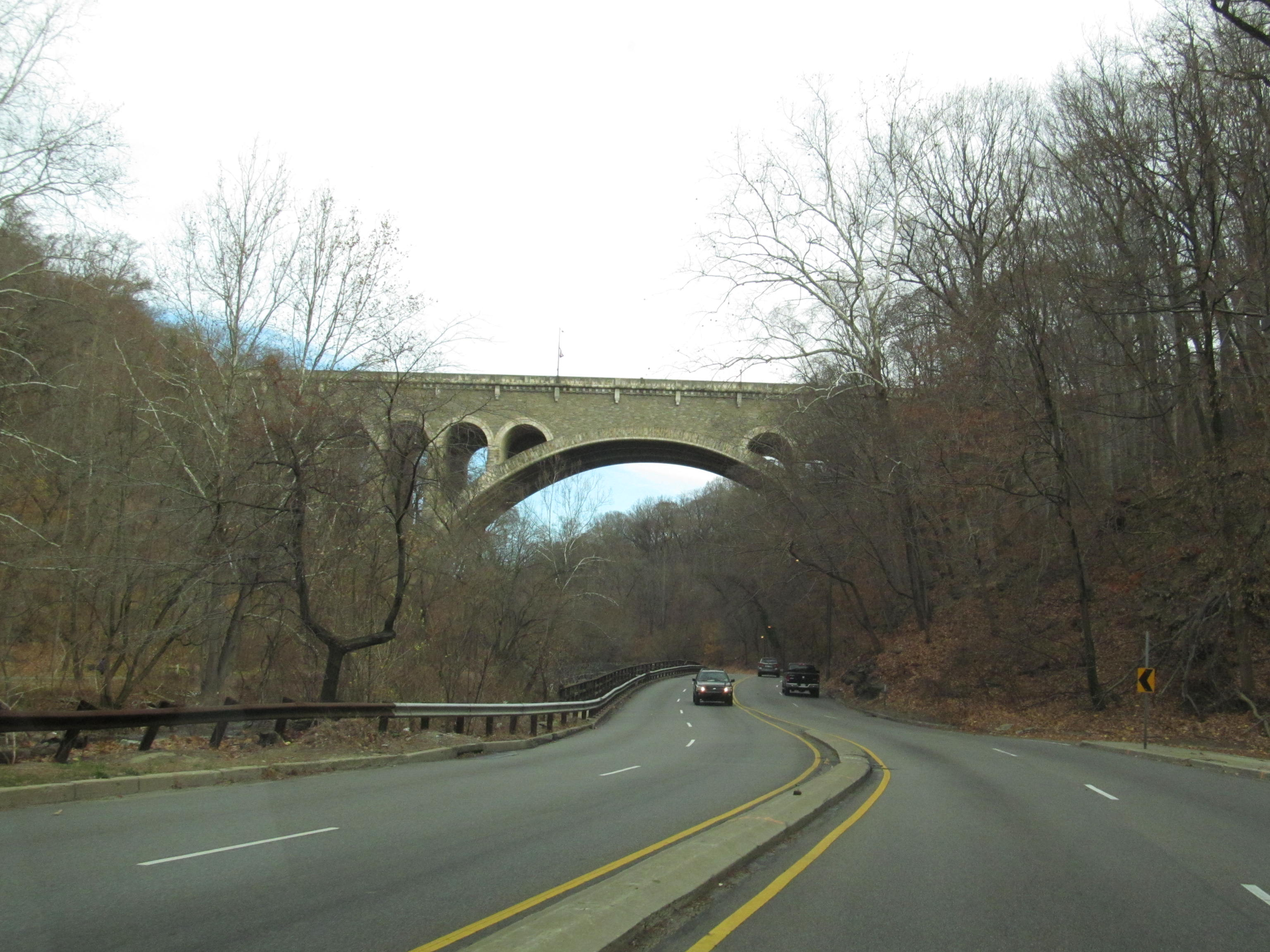
- A view looking north on Lincoln Drive towards the Henry Avenue Bridge.
- Interactive map of Lincoln Drive
- Maintained by: PennDOT and Philadelphia Streets Department
- Length: 4.1 mi (6.6 km)
- Location: Philadelphia
- South end: I-76 / US 1 / Kelly Drive in Philadelphia
- North end: Allens Lane in Philadelphia

Construction
- Commissioned: 1856

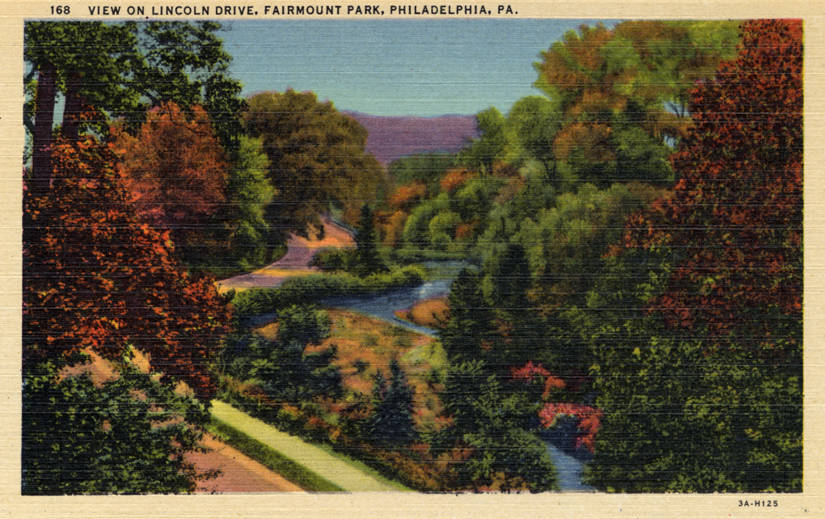
View on Lincoln Drive, Fairmount Park

Lincoln Drive is a full-access, 25 mph 4-lane road in the Wissahickon Creek section of Philadelphia, Pennsylvania. Initially built in 1856 as the Wissahickon Turnpike, it was not completed until about 50 years later. Initially, the purpose of the road was to provide access from the mills to the city of Philadelphia.

Some historic locations that the road passes include Historic RittenhouseTown, Germantown, and Chestnut Hill.

From the 1930s until 1960, Lincoln Drive was designated as the southernmost part of U.S. Route 309.

Famed American soul and R&B singer and songwriter Teddy Pendergrass crashed his car, a Rolls-Royce Silver Spirit, in the East Falls section of Lincoln Drive, near Rittenhouse Street, on March 18, 1982. He sustained a spinal cord injury, leaving him a tetraplegic, paralyzed from the chest down. He never walked again, though Dr. Robert Sataloff created a special vest for him that compressed his chest and restored breath support to enable him to resume singing.
