= Kittanning, Pennsylvania =

Borough in Pennsylvania, US

Kittanning
- Borough
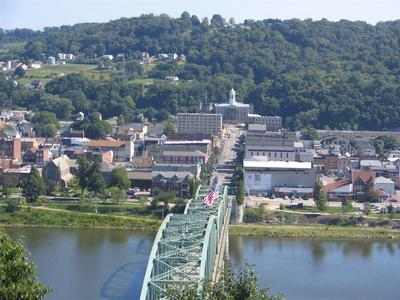
- The Kittanning Citizens Bridge, Armstrong County Courthouse, and downtown of Kittanning
- Etymology: Lenape kithanink, 'on the main river'
- Location of Kittanning in Armstrong County, Pennsylvania.

- Location within Pennsylvania Location within the United States
- Coordinates: 40°49′12″N 79°31′17″W
- Country: United States
- State: Pennsylvania
- County: Armstrong County
- Settled: 1727 (Native American village)
- Settled: 1803 (Borough)

Area
  - Total: 1.25 sq mi (3.24 km^{2})
  - Land: 1.00 sq mi (2.58 km^{2})
  - Water: 0.25 sq mi (0.66 km^{2})

Population (2020)
  - Total: 3,921
  - Density: 3,935.4/sq mi (1,519.46/km^{2})
- Time zone: UTC−5 (EST)
  - Summer (DST): UTC−4 (EDT)
- ZIP Code: 16201
- Area code: 724
- FIPS code: 42-40040
- School district: Armstrong
- Website: Borough website

Kittanning (/kɪˈtænɪŋ/ ki-TAN-ing) is a borough in Armstrong County, Pennsylvania, United States, and its county seat. It is situated 36 miles (58 km) northeast of Pittsburgh, along the east bank of the Allegheny River. The population was 3,921 at the 2020 census.

The name is derived from Kithanink, which means 'on the main river' in Lenape or the Delaware language, from kit- 'big' + hane 'mountain river' + -ink (suffix used in place names). "The main river" is a Lenape term for the Allegheny and Ohio combined, which they considered as all one river. The borough and its bridge have been used as a setting for several films.

== History ==
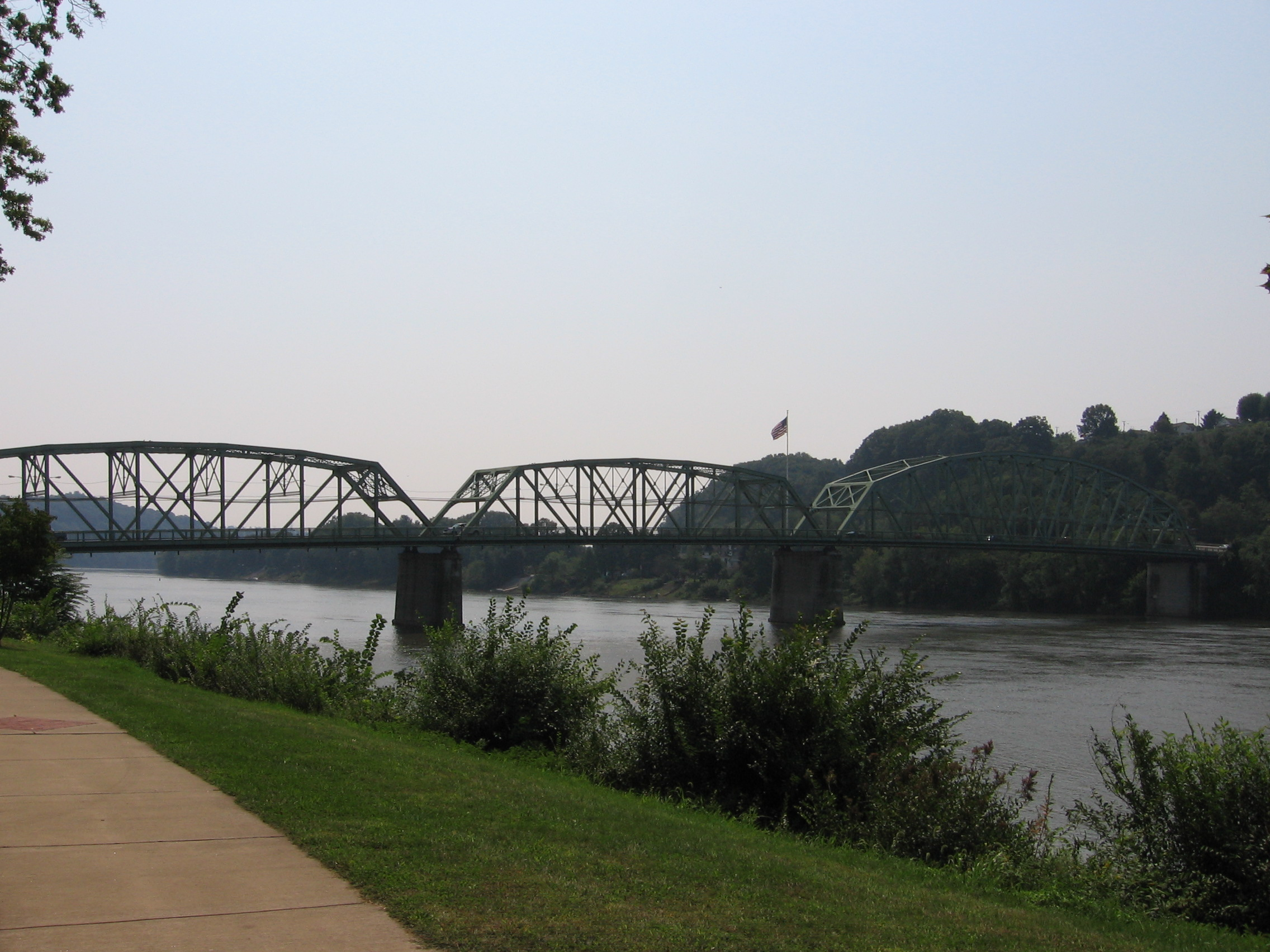
Kittanning Citizens Bridge

The borough is located on the east bank of the Allegheny River, founded on the site of the eighteenth-century Lenape (Delaware) village of Kittanning at the western end of the Kittanning Path, an ancient Native American path.

In 1756, the village was destroyed by John Armstrong Sr. at the Battle of Kittanning during the French and Indian War. During the attack, a blast from the explosion of gunpowder stored in Captain Jacobs's house was heard at Fort Duquesne, present day Pittsburgh, 44 miles away.

Kittanning was designated as the seat of Armstrong County when the county was organized. It was settled by European Americans largely after the American Revolutionary War, although Anthony Sadowski (also recorded by the anglicized name of Sandusky), a prominent Polish-American trader, and other Native American traders operated here before the War.

During the American Civil War, the 103rd Regiment of Pennsylvania Infantry volunteers was organized at Kittanning from September 1861 to February 1862. Among other engagements, the unit participated in the Siege of Yorktown (1862) as well as the Battle of Plymouth (1864), during which most of the regiment was captured.

By the early in the 20th century, the city had developed considerable industry including large iron and steel works, foundries, and coal mines, all associated with the steel and iron industries of Pittsburgh; glassworks, flour and lumber mills; china, pottery, brick, lime, and clay works; mirror and typewriter factories, and breweries. It reached its peak of population in 1930 before the Great Depression. After World War II, changes in industry and restructuring of heavy industry caused a loss of jobs in many of industries, with an associated population decline.

The playground on North Jefferson Street was developed on the former site of the historic Kittanning Cemetery. In order to enable this, the city moved 274 graves in 1960 to a new cemetery formed along Troy Hill Road.

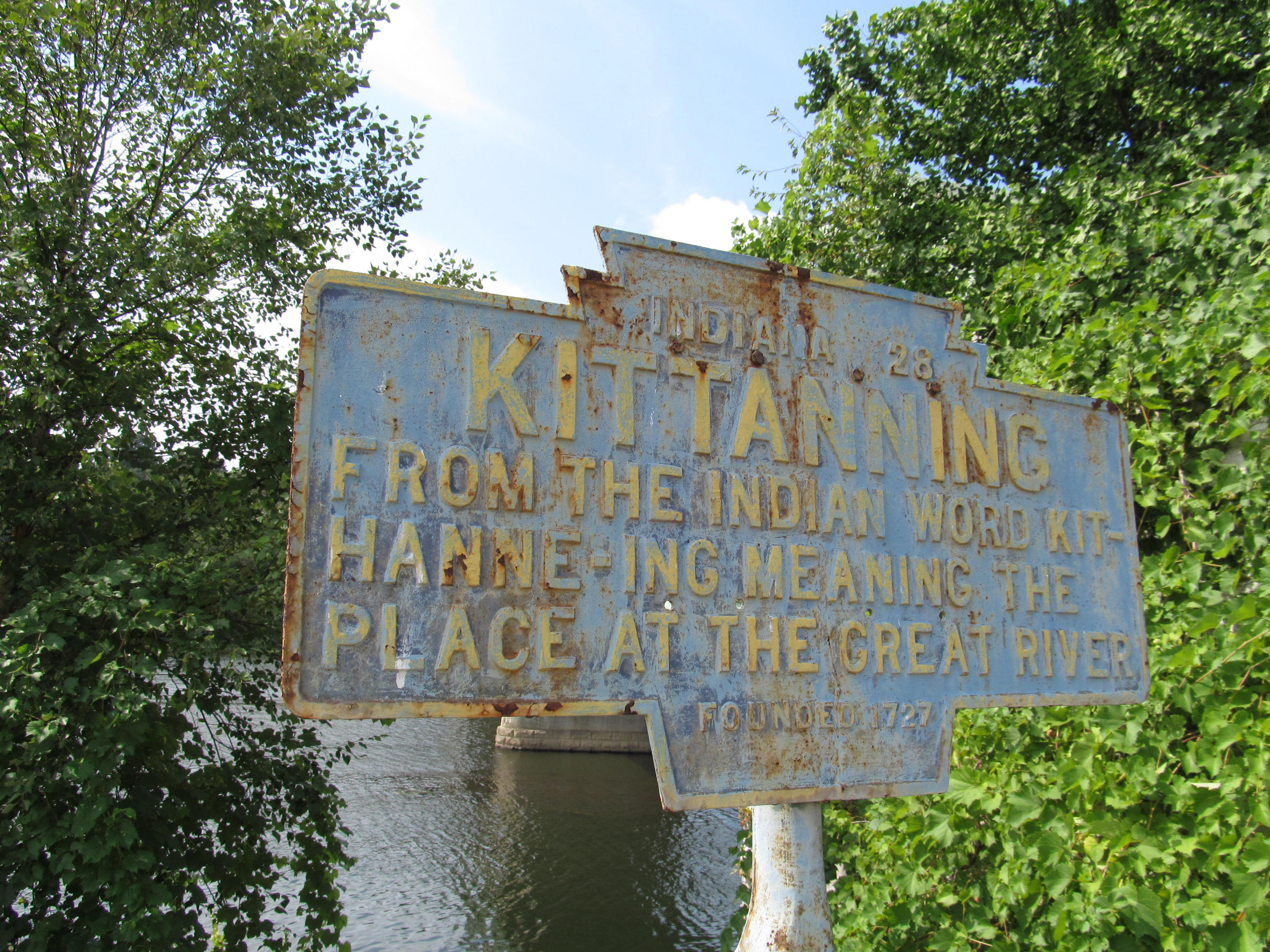
Keystone Marker for Kittanning

In 1900, 3,902 people lived in Kittanning, and in 1910, there were 4,311 inhabitants. After Kittanning merged with Wickboro (1910 population 2,775), in 1914, the population was estimated at 10,000, which was likely high. The 1920 census counted 7,153 residents. In 1930, there were 7,808 residents; in 1940, 7,550. Since late 20th century industrial decline, the population was 4,044 at the 2010 census.

The Allegheny River Lock and Dam No. 7 and Armstrong County Courthouse and Jail are each listed on the National Register of Historic Places.

== Geography ==
Kittanning is located at 40°49′12″N 79°31′17″W (40.820085, −79.521398). According to the United States Census Bureau, the borough has a total area of 1.0 square mile (2.6 km^{2}), all land.

== Demographics ==
Historical population
Census	Pop.	Note	%±
1810	309		—
1820	318		2.9%
1830	526		65.4%
1840	702		33.5%
1850	1,561		122.4%
1860	1,696		8.6%
1870	1,889		11.4%
1880	2,624		38.9%
1890	3,095		17.9%
1900	3,902		26.1%
1910	4,311		10.5%
1920	7,153		65.9%
1930	7,808		9.2%
1940	7,550		−3.3%
1950	7,731		2.4%
1960	6,793		−12.1%
1970	6,231		−8.3%
1980	5,432		−12.8%
1990	5,120		−5.7%
2000	4,787		−6.5%
2010	4,044		−15.5%
2020	3,921		−3.0%

=== 2020 census ===
As of the 2020 census, Kittanning had a population of 3,921. The median age was 43.7 years. 21.0% of residents were under the age of 18 and 20.5% of residents were 65 years of age or older. For every 100 females there were 89.3 males, and for every 100 females age 18 and over there were 89.4 males age 18 and over.

97.0% of residents lived in urban areas, while 3.0% lived in rural areas.

There were 1,803 households in Kittanning, of which 23.8% had children under the age of 18 living in them. Of all households, 27.6% were married-couple households, 24.6% were households with a male householder and no spouse or partner present, and 38.4% were households with a female householder and no spouse or partner present. About 44.5% of all households were made up of individuals and 19.4% had someone living alone who was 65 years of age or older.

There were 2,119 housing units, of which 14.9% were vacant. The homeowner vacancy rate was 4.6% and the rental vacancy rate was 9.9%.

Racial composition as of the 2020 census
Race	Number	Percent
White	3,665	93.5%
Black or African American	40	1.0%
American Indian and Alaska Native	6	0.2%
Asian	20	0.5%
Native Hawaiian and Other Pacific Islander	0	0.0%
Some other race	15	0.4%
Two or more races	175	4.5%
Hispanic or Latino (of any race)	42	1.1%

=== 2000 census ===
As of the 2000 census, there were 4,787 people, 2,032 households, and 1,117 families residing in the borough. The population density was 4,615.2 inhabitants per square mile (1,781.9/km^{2}). There were 2,251 housing units at an average density of 2,170.2 per square mile (837.9/km^{2}). The racial makeup of the borough was 97.31% White, 1.57% African American, 0.23% Native American, 0.25% Asian, 0.08% from other races, and 0.56% from two or more races. Hispanic or Latino of any race were 0.67% of the population.

There were 2,032 households, out of which 26.2% had children under the age of 18 living with them, 36.7% were married couples living together, 14.9% had a female householder with no husband present, and 45.0% were non-families. 40.5% of all households were made up of individuals, and 19.4% had someone living alone who was 65 years of age or older. The average household size was 2.19 and the average family size was 2.96.

The borough median age of 40 years was the same as the county median age. The distribution by age group was 22.2% under the age of 18, 10.4% from 18 to 24, 27.1% from 25 to 44, 20.3% from 45 to 64, and 20.1% who were 65 years of age or older. The median age was 40 years. For every 100 females, there were 82.5 males. For every 100 females age 18 and over, there were 78.2 males.

The median income for a household in the borough was $20,921, and the median income for a family was $30,822. Males had a median income of $29,036 versus $20,040 for females. The per capita income for the borough was $13,787. About 12.3% of families and 16.4% of the population were below the poverty line, including 14.8% of those under age 18 and 11.7% of those age 65 or over.

== Education ==
All public schools in the Kittanning attendance area are a part of the Armstrong School District.

The Kittanning Public Library was established in 1923 as the Kittanning Free Library. As of 2020, the library had 4,189 registered users and circulated 10,930 items in that fiscal year. The library is one of six independent libraries in Armstrong County, and is supported by the New Castle Library District.

== Media ==
Newspapers in Kittanning include the Leader Times.

== Infrastructure ==
Kittanning was home to the Armstrong Power Plant from 1958 to 2012.

== Notable people ==
- Nick Bowers, NFL tight end for the Miami Dolphins
- Paul Bowser, professional wrestler and promoter
- Joe Cooper, racing driver
- Mitch Frerotte, former NFL player
- Daniel Brodhead Heiner, U.S. Representative from Pennsylvania
- Ed Hobaugh, baseball player
- Teri Hope, actress and Playboy Playmate
- Jeanette Jena, art critic
- Ralph Patt, jazz guitarist
- Mickey Morandini, baseball player
- Dick Starr, major league pitcher
- George L. Shoup, First governor of Idaho, United States senator

== In popular culture ==
Several popular movies and televisions programs have been filmed in Kittanning.

The original bridge over the Allegheny River at Kittanning was torn down and replaced with the Kittanning Citizens Bridge, which was built higher above ground level to avoid flooding. Scenes with the town and bridge were the used in the film The Mothman Prophecies (2002) starring Richard Gere and Laura Linney, which was filmed in the Kittanning area.

Scenes for the 2009 horror movie My Bloody Valentine 3D were filmed in Kittanning.

The 2010 pilot episode for Justified, starring Timothy Olyphant, was filmed in Kittanning and its surrounding areas.

Filming for the movie One for the Money took place during summer 2010.

The setting for three episodes of the Netflix original TV series Mindhunter is based in Altoona, but scenes were actually shot in and around Kittanning in January 2017.

In the 2019 Netflix show Manhunt (the lone wolf), a second season of the show, based on the 1996 Centennial Olympic Park bombing and the nationwide 5-year search of Eric Rudolph, was filmed in Kittanning. The show premiered on February 3, 2020.

== See also ==
- List of crossings of the Allegheny River
- List of towns and boroughs in Pennsylvania
