= West Pottsgrove Township, Pennsylvania =

Township in Pennsylvania, US

West Pottsgrove Township
- Township
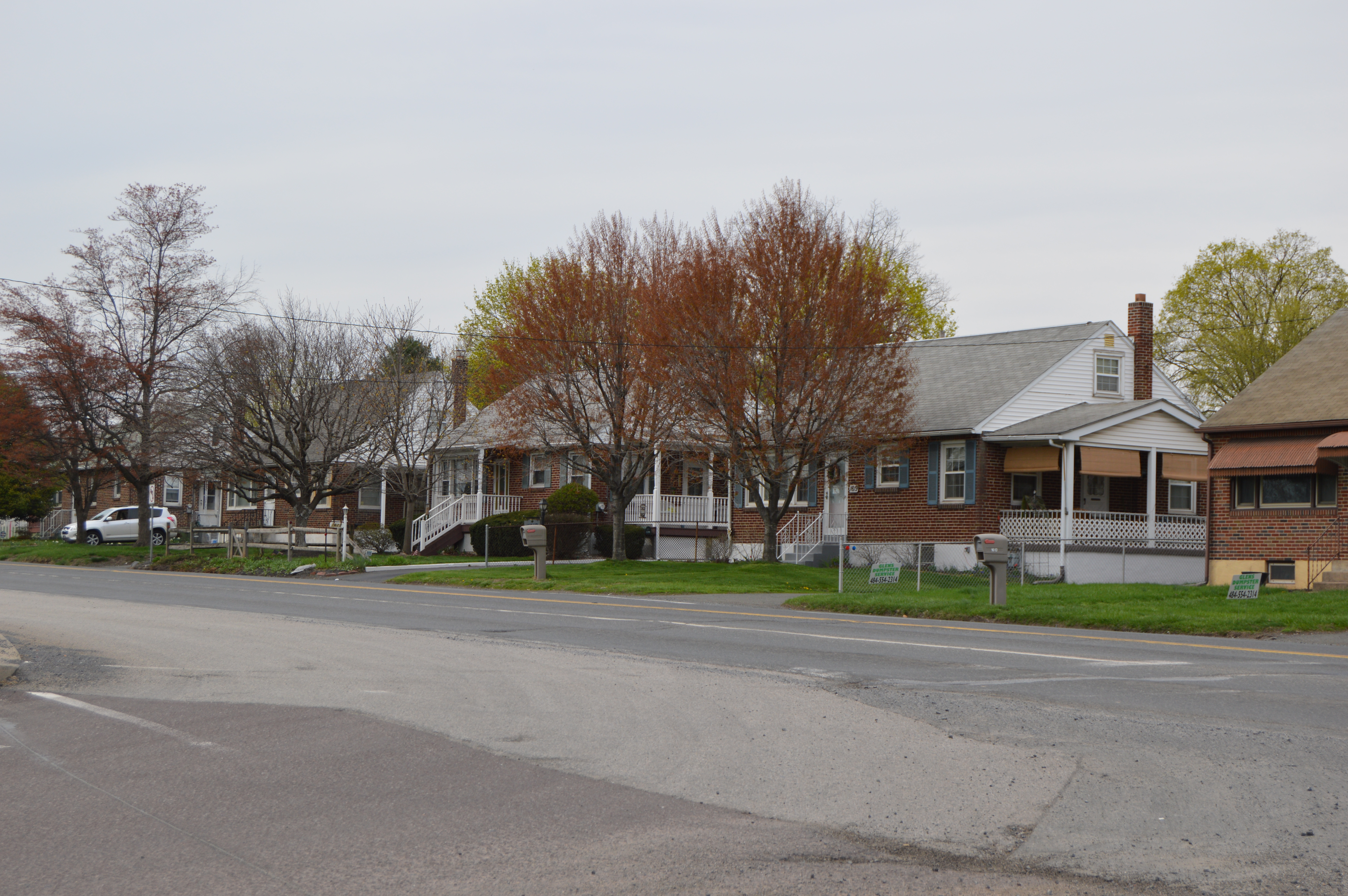
- High Street in Stowe

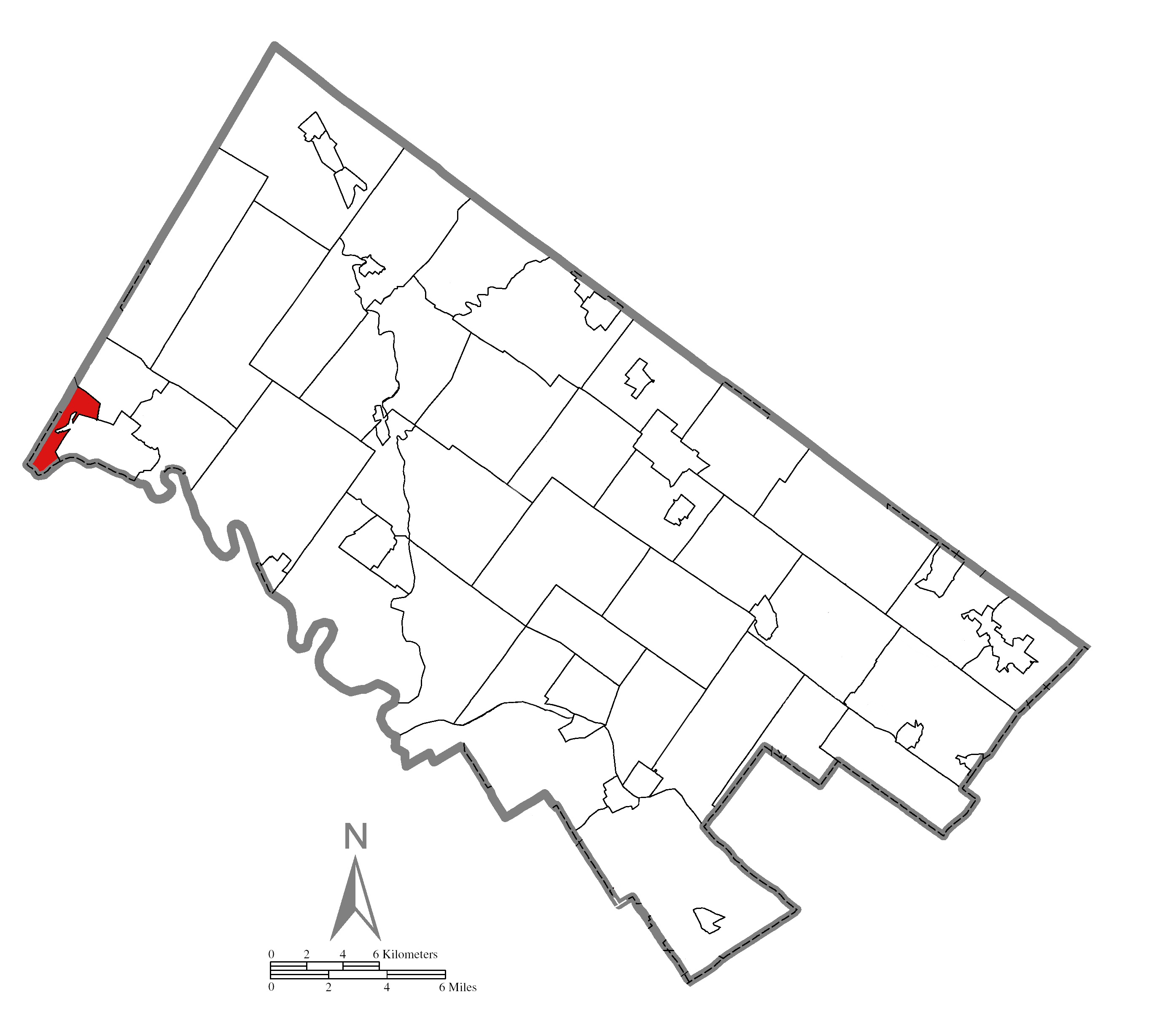
- Location of West Pottsgrove Township in Montgomery County

- Location of PA in the United States
- Coordinates: 40°15′17″N 75°40′42″W
- Country: United States
- State: Pennsylvania
- County: Montgomery

Area
  - Total: 2.36 sq mi (6.10 km^{2})
  - Land: 2.32 sq mi (6.02 km^{2})
  - Water: 0.031 sq mi (0.08 km^{2})
- Elevation: 220 ft (67 m)

Population (2010)
  - Total: 3,874
  - Estimate (2016): 3,882
  - Density: 1,670.1/sq mi (644.83/km^{2})
- Time zone: UTC-5 (EST)
  - Summer (DST): UTC-4 (EDT)
- Area code: 610
- Website: https://westpottsgrove.org/

West Pottsgrove Township is a township in Montgomery County, Pennsylvania, United States. The population was 3,874 at the 2010 census.

== Geography ==
According to the United States Census Bureau, the township has a total area of 2.4 square miles (6.2 km^{2}), of which 2.3 square miles (6.0 km^{2}) is land and 0.1 square miles (0.26 km^{2}), or 2.08%, is water. It is drained by the Schuylkill River, which separates it from Chester County. Its villages include Stowe and Upper Glasgow.

=== Neighboring municipalities ===
- Upper Pottsgrove Township (northeast)
- Pottstown (southeast)
- North Coventry Township, Chester County (south)
- Union Township, Berks County (tangent to the southwest)
- Douglass Township, Berks County (northwest)

== Transportation ==
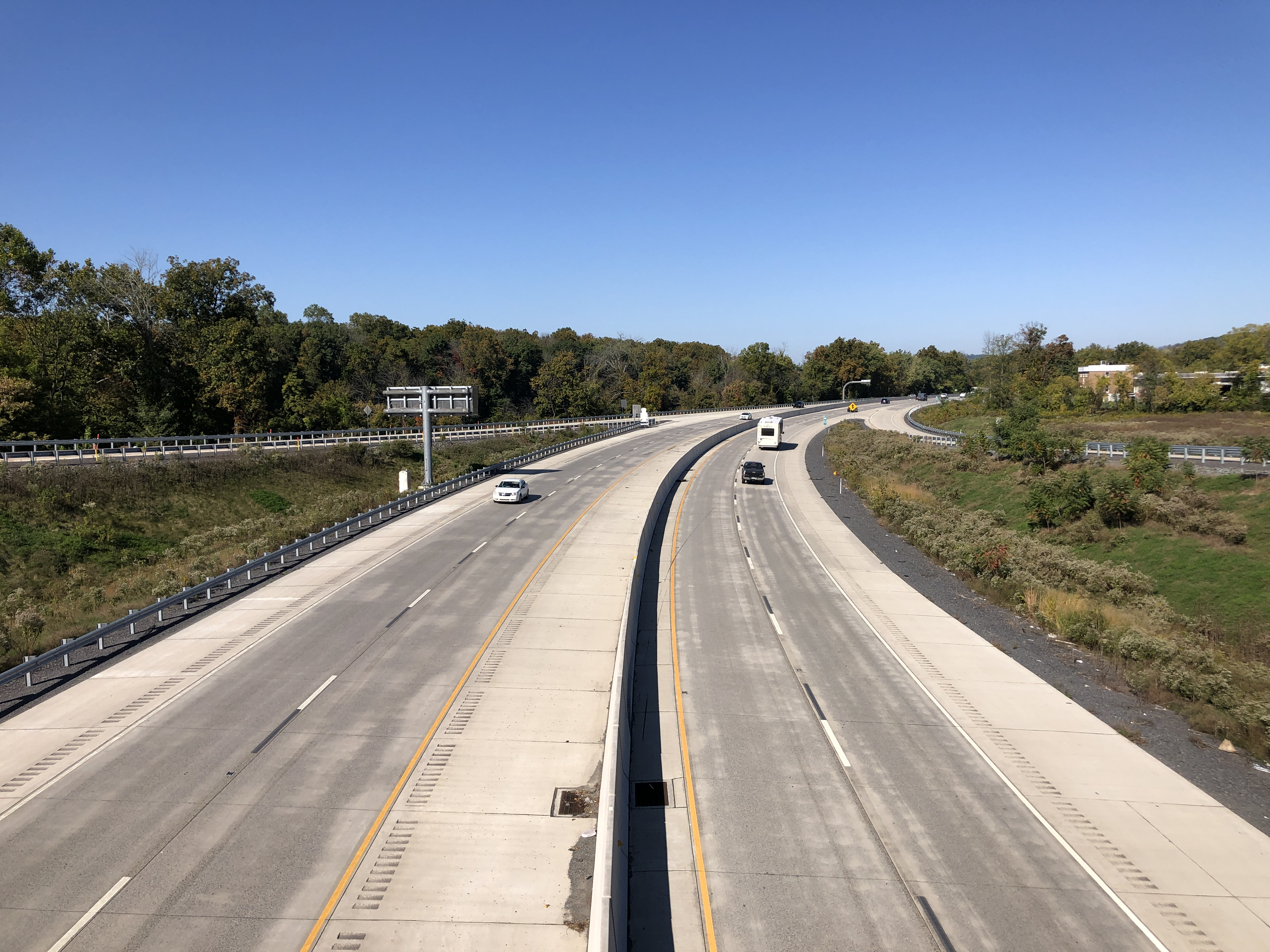
US 422 westbound in West Pottsgrove Township

As of 2018 there were 20.28 miles (32.64 km) of public roads in West Pottsgrove Township, of which 5.96 miles (9.59 km) were maintained by the Pennsylvania Department of Transportation (PennDOT) and 14.32 miles (23.05 km) were maintained by the township.

U.S. Route 422 is the main highway serving West Pottsgrove Township, traversing the southern corner of the township on an east–west alignment. A small section of Pennsylvania Route 100 crosses the eastern corner of the township.

Pottstown Area Rapid Transit (PART) provides bus service to West Pottsgrove Township with the Green and Orange lines providing service to Pottstown. The Green Line serves Stowe while the Green and Orange lines serve the Upland Square shopping center.

== Demographics ==
Historical population
Census	Pop.	Note	%±
1930	2,400		—
1940	2,605		8.5%
1950	3,007		15.4%
1960	3,501		16.4%
1970	4,038		15.3%
1980	4,208		4.2%
1990	3,829		−9.0%
2000	3,815		−0.4%
2010	3,874		1.5%
2020	3,798		−2.0%

As of the 2010 census, the township was 83.7% White, 9.5% Black or African American, 0.3% Native American, 0.6% Asian, and 2.9% were two or more races. 3.3% of the population were of Hispanic or Latino ancestry.

At the 2000 census there were 3,815 people, 1,524 households, and 1,010 families living in the township. The population density was 1,622.0 inhabitants per square mile (626.3/km^{2}). There were 1,606 housing units at an average density of 682.8 per square mile (263.6/km^{2}). The racial makeup of the township was 89.28% White, 7.21% African American, 0.18% Native American, 0.84% Asian, 0.03% Pacific Islander, 0.81% from other races, and 1.65% from two or more races. Hispanic or Latino of any race were 2.18%.

There were 1,524 households, 29.9% had children under the age of 18 living with them, 52.2% were married couples living together, 10.7% had a female householder with no husband present, and 33.7% were non-families. 27.2% of households were made up of individuals, and 9.6% were one person aged 65 or older. The average household size was 2.50 and the average family size was 3.08.

The age distribution was 24.6% under the age of 18, 7.7% from 18 to 24, 32.3% from 25 to 44, 22.0% from 45 to 64, and 13.5% 65 or older. The median age was 36 years. For every 100 females there were 92.9 males. For every 100 females age 18 and over, there were 91.7 males.

The median household income was $42,759 and the median family income was $52,177. Males had a median income of $32,912 versus $28,949 for females. The per capita income for the township was $18,413. About 5.8% of families and 7.7% of the population were below the poverty line, including 8.7% of those under age 18 and 7.3% of those age 65 or over.

== Government and politics ==
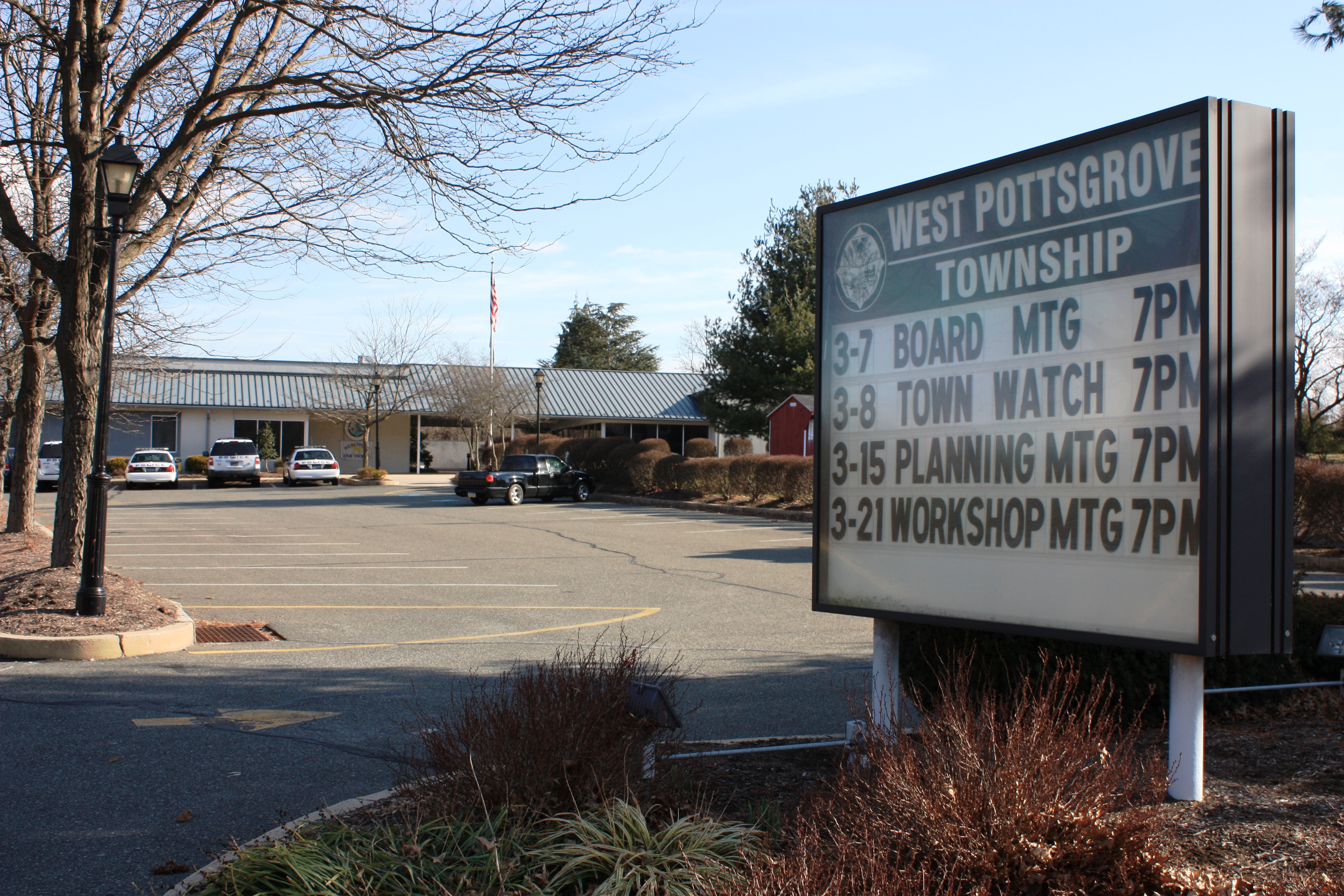
West Pottsgrove Township municipal building

West Pottsgrove Township is governed by a five-member Board of Commissioners. As of 2025, the Board of Commissioners is composed of:

- President Steve Miller
- Vice President Mark Green
- Charlie Valentine
- Dennis Arms
- Howard Shawell

Presidential elections results
Year	Republican	Democratic
2020	48.0% 858	50.0% 888
2016	50.6% 769	43.0% 669
2012	43.8% 623	53.8% 764
2008	37.2% 555	61.2% 912
2004	42.2% 589	57.2% 799
2000	42.2% 456	54.2% 585
1996	34.1% 324	49.3% 468
1992	32.4% 364	44.4% 498
