= Stowe, Pennsylvania =

Unincorporated community in Pennsylvania, US

- Census-designated place
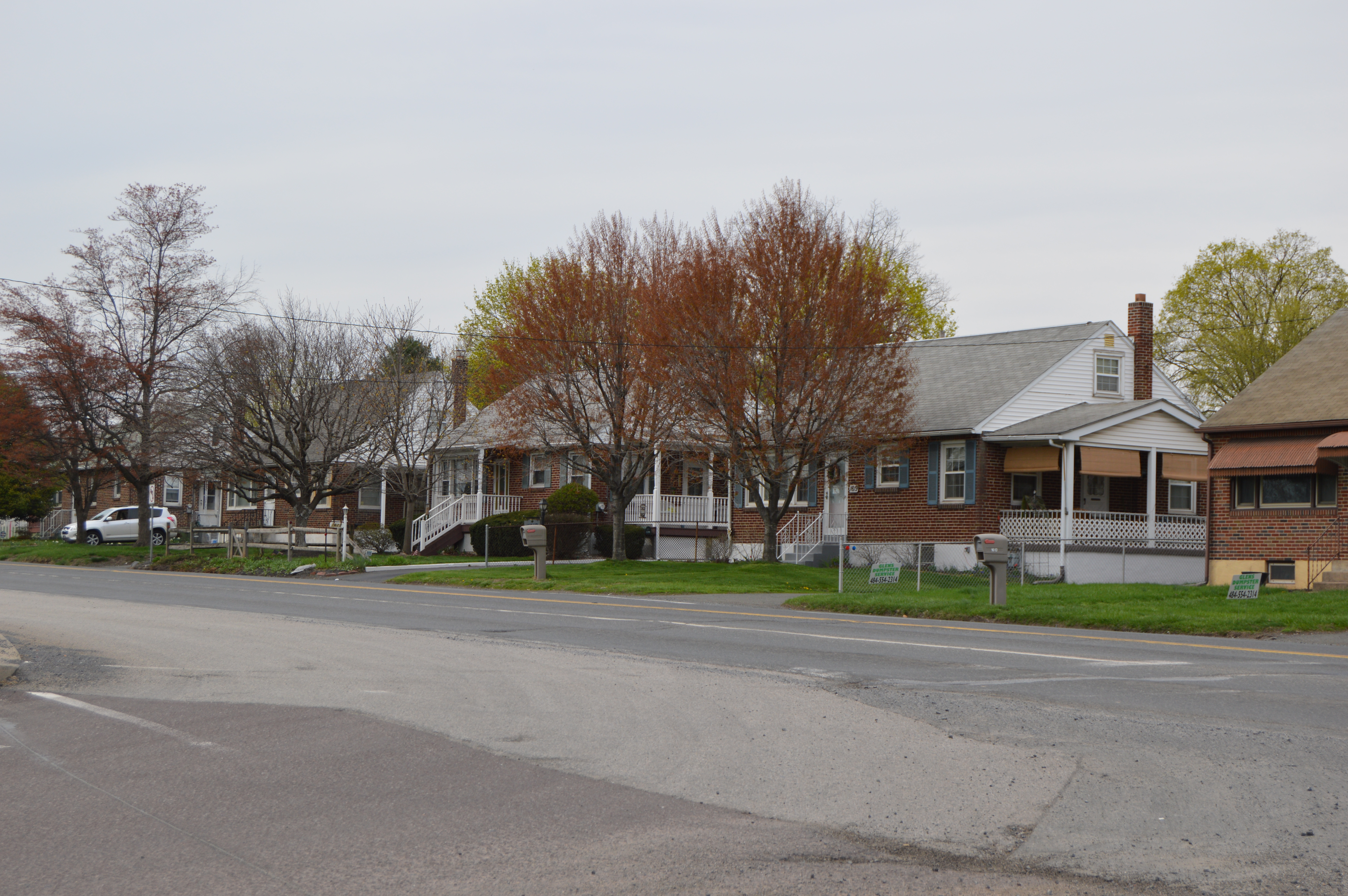
- Houses on High Street

- Location of Stowe in Pennsylvania Stowe (the United States)
- Coordinates: 40°15′06″N 75°40′52″W
- Country: United States
- State: Pennsylvania
- County: Montgomery
- Township: West Pottsgrove

Area
  - Total: 1.5 sq mi (3.9 km^{2})
  - Land: 1.5 sq mi (3.9 km^{2})
  - Water: 0.0 sq mi (0 km^{2})
- Elevation: 197 ft (60 m)

Population (2010)
  - Total: 3,695
  - Density: 2,500/sq mi (950/km^{2})
- Time zone: UTC-5 (EST)
  - Summer (DST): UTC-4 (EDT)
- ZIP code: 19464
- Area codes: 610, 484, & 835

Stowe is a census-designated place (CDP) in West Pottsgrove Township, Pennsylvania, United States. The population was 3,695 at the 2010 census. It uses the Pottstown ZIP code of 19464.

== Geography ==
Stowe is located at 40°15′6″N 75°40′52″W (40.251695, -75.681230).

According to the United States Census Bureau, the CDP has a total area of 1.5 square miles (3.9 km^{2}), all land. It occupies the space between Pottstown on the east and Berks County on the west, while the Schuylkill River forms its natural southern boundary. Stowe has the Pottstown Expressway (U.S. Route 422) and High Street as its east-to-west thoroughfares. Grosstown Road is the main north-to-south route and interchanges with 422 at its southern terminus.

Stowe's hardiness zone is 7a and the climate is borderline Cfa/Dfa (humid subtropical/hot summer humid continental.) It is served by the Pottstown post office and telephone exchange.

== Demographics ==
Historical population
Census	Pop.	Note	%±
1990	3,598		—
2000	3,585		−0.4%
2010	3,695		3.1%
2020	3,595		−2.7%

=== 2020 census ===
As of the 2020 census, Stowe had a population of 3,595. The median age was 37.6 years. 22.0% of residents were under the age of 18 and 13.8% of residents were 65 years of age or older. For every 100 females there were 93.3 males, and for every 100 females age 18 and over there were 95.2 males age 18 and over.

100.0% of residents lived in urban areas, while 0.0% lived in rural areas.

There were 1,474 households in Stowe, of which 29.4% had children under the age of 18 living in them. Of all households, 40.4% were married-couple households, 21.9% were households with a male householder and no spouse or partner present, and 28.4% were households with a female householder and no spouse or partner present. About 27.5% of all households were made up of individuals and 10.0% had someone living alone who was 65 years of age or older.

There were 1,543 housing units, of which 4.5% were vacant. The homeowner vacancy rate was 1.9% and the rental vacancy rate was 3.6%.

Racial composition as of the 2020 census
Race	Number	Percent
White	2,836	78.9%
Black or African American	352	9.8%
American Indian and Alaska Native	9	0.3%
Asian	23	0.6%
Native Hawaiian and Other Pacific Islander	3	0.1%
Some other race	77	2.1%
Two or more races	295	8.2%
Hispanic or Latino (of any race)	214	6.0%

=== 2010 census ===
As of the 2010 census, the CDP was 83.3% Non-Hispanic White, 9.7% Black or African American, 0.3% Native American and Alaskan Native, 0.6% Asian, 0.9% were Some Other Race, and 3.1% were two or more races. 3.3% of the population were of Hispanic or Latino ancestry.

=== 2000 census ===
At the 2000 census there were 3,585 people, 1,433 households, and 951 families living in the CDP. The population density was 2,456.6 inhabitants per square mile (948.5/km^{2}). There were 1,507 housing units at an average density of 1,032.7 per square mile (398.7/km^{2}). The racial makeup of the CDP was 89.26% White, 7.22% African American, 0.17% Native American, 0.89% Asian, 0.03% Pacific Islander, 0.73% from other races, and 1.70% from two or more races. Hispanic or Latino of any race were 2.12%.

There were 1,433 households, 29.6% had children under the age of 18 living with them, 51.9% were married couples living together, 10.8% had a female householder with no husband present, and 33.6% were non-families. 27.3% of households were made up of individuals, and 9.7% were one person aged 65 or older. The average household size was 2.50 and the average family size was 3.08.

The age distribution was 24.6% under the age of 18, 7.7% from 18 to 24, 31.6% from 25 to 44, 22.3% from 45 to 64, and 13.7% 65 or older. The median age was 37 years. For every 100 females, there were 92.8 males. For every 100 females age 18 and over, there were 91.2 males.

The median household income was $42,434 and the median family income was $50,605. Males had a median income of $32,264 versus $29,318 for females. The per capita income for the CDP was $18,515. About 6.1% of families and 7.9% of the population were below the poverty line, including 9.6% of those under age 18 and 6.5% of those age 65 or over.

== Education ==
It is in the Pottsgrove School District.
