= LaDue Reservoir =

- Location of LaDue Reservoir in Ohio

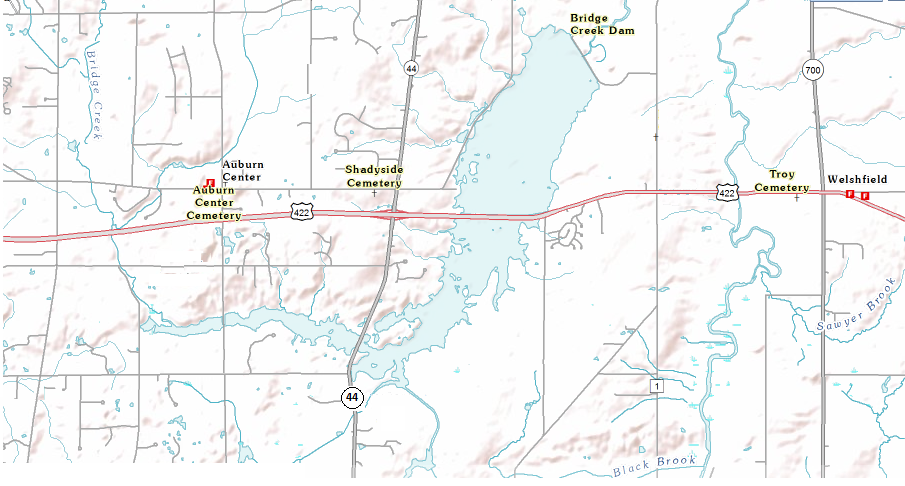
- USGS Map of LaDue Reservoir
- Location: Auburn Twp and Troy Township, Geauga County, Ohio
- Coordinates: 41°23′19″N 81°11′50″W
- Type: reservoir
- Primary inflows: Bridge Creek and Black Brook
- Primary outflows: Bridge Creek and Black Brook
- Catchment area: 42 sq mi (110 km^{2})
- Basin countries: United States
- Max. length: 5.5 mi (8.9 km)
- Max. width: .15 to .8 mi (0.24 to 1.29 km)
- Surface area: 1,477 acres (5.98 km^{2})
- Max. depth: 21 ft (6.4 m)
- Water volume: 18,100 acre⋅ft (22.3 hm^{3})
- Shore length^{1}: 24.3 mi (39.1 km)
- Surface elevation: 1,127 ft (344 m)
- ^{1} Shore length is not a well-defined measure.

LaDue Reservoir is a reservoir located near Ohio State Route 44 and U.S. Route 422 in Auburn and Troy Townships in Geauga County, Ohio. Originally called the “Akron City Reservoir”, it was dedicated as the LaDue Reservoir on October 11, 1961, in honor of Wendell R. LaDue. The Geographic Names Information System recognized four variants names, including Akron City Reservoir, Bridge Creek Reservoir, Ladue Reservoir, and Wendell R. Ladue Reservoir.

The reservoir is formed by the Bridge Creek Dam 41°24′16″N 81°11′2″W across Bridge Creek and the Black Brook Dike 41°21′4″N 81°12′36″W across Black Brook, both tributaries of the Cuyahoga River.

The reservoir was created in an area that was covered with ice during the Wisconsinan glaciation and contains numerous glacial sand and gravel deposits (kames) and glacial ponds (kettles). The lake bottom retains the same irregularities found before it was dammed.

== Purpose ==
The reservoir and surrounding land is owned by the City of Akron, Ohio and is operated by Akron's Watershed Division.

The reservoir is one of three reservoirs that make up the City of Akron water supply, including LaDue Reservoir, East Branch Reservoir in Claridon Township, Geauga County, Ohio, and Lake Rockwell in Franklin Township, Portage County, Ohio. The main purposes of these reservoirs are to provide flood control to downstream areas, replenish the river's flow during dry periods, and maintain an ample supply of available drinking water for Akron.

Because Lake Rockwell is the main drinking water supply for the City of Akron, it is highly protected with no trespassing, fishing, or recreation permitted. However, both the East Branch Reservoir and the LaDue Reservoir are open to fishing, boating, and hunting. However, the Ohio Revised Code has special fishing regulations for LaDue Reservoir that do not allow gasoline motors on any watercraft, limit the size of electric motors, and restrict shoreline fishing to the right-of-ways along Ohio State Route 44, U.S. Route 422, and Auburn Road.

== Dams ==
=== Bridge Creek Dam ===
The Bridge Creek Dam 41°24′16″N 81°11′2″W, also known as the LaDue Dam, is a rolled earth fill with impervious core, maximum height 35 feet (11 m), top length 3,200 feet (980 m), top width 40 feet (12 m), base width about 120 feet (37 m) and length 4,500 feet (1,400 m). Spillway: Uncontrolled concrete lined saddle spillway that is 200 feet (61 m) at the top and 250 feet (76 m) near at the base. The drop is about 30 feet (9.1 m). The Bridge Creek Dam is a restricted zone with “No Trespassing Zone” signs on land and has marker buoys in the water.

=== Black Brook Dike and dam ===
The Black Brook Dike is 100 feet (30 m) wide and nearly 1.0 mi (1.6 km) long. It is located at the southern tip of the reservoir near the intersection of Bartholomew Road and Ohio State Route 44.

The Black Brook Dam 41°21′4″N 81°12′36″W is a rolled earth fill with impervious core, maximum height 20 feet (6.1 m), top length 325 feet (99 m), top width 30 feet (9.1 m), base width about 100 feet (30 m) and length 1,100 feet (340 m). It is located near the intersection of Crackel Road and Ohio State Route 44, about 1,500 ft (460 m) feet north of the Geauga-Portage County border. It uses a 6 feet (1.8 m) concrete drainage ditch to evacuate water. The Black Brook Dike and Dam are restricted zones with “No Trespassing Zone” signs posted on land and marker buoys in the water.

== Recreation ==
The LaDue Reservoir wildlife area includes 8,791 acres (3,558 ha) that protects the watershed of the east branch of the Cuyahoga River from the East Branch Reservoir at Headwaters Park in East Claridon, Ohio to Ohio State Route 82 in Mantua Township, Portage County, Ohio.

For many years, the City of Akron managed recreation activities at its reservoirs. Since 2002, the Ohio Department of Natural Resources Division of Wildlife has managed the LaDue Public Hunting Area for the City of Akron, which includes hunting, trapping, boating, and fishing. The wildlife area includes diverse wildlife, including white-tailed deer, wild turkey, squirrel, rabbit, and woodchuck. Waterfowl include migrating mallards, wood duck, and Canada geese. LaDue Reservoir contains sport fish including walleye, largemouth bass, bluegill, yellow perch, white and black crappie, and channel catfish.

=== Boating and fishing ===
Ohio Revised Code Chapter 1501:31-13 designates special fishing regulations for LaDue Reservoir that restrict watercraft to electric motors only and restrict shorelines fishing to the right-of-ways along Ohio State Route 44, U.S. Route 422, and Auburn Roads. Fishing in Ohio requires a valid Ohio Fishing License and is subject to Ohio fishing regulations. No gasoline engines can be used on LaDue Reservoir.

ODNR Division of Wildlife maintains a gravel boat ramp with portable toilets near the intersection of East Washington Street and Valley Road. There is also an unimproved boat ramp at the south end of the reservoir where Ohio State Route 44 crosses the reservoir. Boats are limited to electric motors only.

As of 2019, Breakaway Excursions began operating kayak and fishing boat rentals out of the La Due boathouse.

=== Hunting and trapping ===
Waterfowl hunting on LaDue Reservoir is limited to designated areas only and limited to hunters selected in an annual drawing held by the ODNR Division of Wildlife. Hunting in Ohio is subject to hunting regulations.

Furbearer trapping is permitted throughout the area, however, it too requires a permit to trap beaver or river otter and is limited to trappers selected in an annual drawing by the Division of Wildlife. Trapping in Ohio is subject to trapping regulations.

=== Environmental conditions ===
In 2010, excessive heat contributed to concerns for harmful algal blooms in many inland lakes in NE Ohio, including LaDue Reservoir. A harmful algal bloom occurs when naturally occurring blue-green algae, or cyanobacteria, produce neurotoxins, which affect the nervous system, and hepatotoxins, which affect the liver. It is now monitored by the Ohio Department of Health.

== See also ==
- Geauga Park District
- Ohio Department of Natural Resources
