= U.S. Route 422 =

Highway in Ohio and Pennsylvania

U.S. Route 422
- US 422 highlighted in red

Route information
- Auxiliary route of US 22
- Maintained by ODOT and PennDOT
- Length: 270.41 mi (435.18 km)
- Existed: 1926–present

Western segment
- Length: 187.85 mi (302.32 km)
- West end: US 6 / US 20 / SR 8 / SR 14 / SR 43 / SR 87 at Public Square in Cleveland, OH
- Major intersections: I-90 in Cleveland, OH; I-77 in Cleveland, OH; I-271 / I-480 in Solon, OH; I-80 near Youngstown, OH; I-376 / US 422 Bus. near New Castle, PA; US 224 in New Castle, PA; US 19 near Portersville, PA; I-79 near Portersville, PA; PA 28 / PA 66 near Kittanning, PA; US 119 near Indiana, PA
- East end: US 219 near Ebensburg, PA

Eastern segment
- Length: 82.560 mi (132.867 km)
- West end: US 322 / PA 39 near Hershey, PA
- Major intersections: PA 72 in Lebanon, PA; US 222 near Reading, PA; I-176 near Reading, PA; PA 100 in South Pottstown, PA; PA 29 near Collegeville, PA; PA 23 in King of Prussia, PA
- East end: I-76 / US 202 in King of Prussia, PA

Location
- Country: United States
- States: Ohio, Pennsylvania
- Counties: OH: Cuyahoga, Geauga, Portage, Trumbull, Mahoning; PA: Lawrence, Butler, Armstrong, Indiana, Cambria; Dauphin, Lebanon, Berks, Montgomery, Chester

Highway system
- United States Numbered Highway System; List; Special; Divided
← SR 421	OH	→ SR 423
← PA 420	PA	→ PA 423

U.S. Route 422 (US 422) is a 271-mile-long (436 km) spur route of US 22 split into two segments in the U.S. states of Ohio and Pennsylvania. The western segment of US 422 runs from downtown Cleveland, Ohio, east to Ebensburg, Pennsylvania. The eastern segment, located entirely within Pennsylvania, runs from Hershey east to King of Prussia, near Philadelphia. US 422 Business (US 422 Bus.) serves as a business route into each of four towns along the way.

In downtown Cleveland, the western terminus of the western segment of US 422 is at US 6, US 20, US 42, and State Route 3 (SR 3) in Cleveland's Public Square, while the eastern terminus of the western segment is at an interchange with US 219 near Ebensburg. In Hershey, the eastern segment of US 422 begins at an interchange with US 322 and Pennsylvania Route 39 (PA 39), while the eastern terminus of the eastern segment is at an interchange with US 202 and I-76 near King of Prussia. US 422 is named the Benjamin Franklin Highway in Pennsylvania in honor of Benjamin Franklin.

== Numbering and gap ==
The segmented nature of US 422 violates American Association of State Highway and Transportation Officials (AASHTO) numbering conventions, representing the only gap in a U.S. route not involving the Canada–United States border or Yellowstone National Park. At the creation of the U.S. Highway system, AASHTO proposed the present western segment as the full length of US 422, while Pennsylvania wanted it to stretch across the state as part of a proposed Philadelphia–Omaha "Ben Franklin Highway" – including the Philadelphia–Reading road, which AASHTO had proposed to be a part of US 120. AASHTO questioned this request and noted that it would not renumber the longer US 22 from Reading to Ebensburg to create a continuous route; Pennsylvania assented to the two disconnected segments, and they were approved.

== Route description ==
=== Western segment ===
==== Ohio ====
The western section of US 422 begins at US 6 and US 20 at the center of Cleveland's Public Square in the downtown district. US 422 and SR 14, which shares its western terminus with that of US 422, form a concurrency as the roadway heads south from the square. Less than a mile from the Public Square, US 422 and SR 14 intersect the Cleveland Innerbelt, the confluence of Interstate 90 (I-90) and the northern termini of I-71 and I-77. US 422 and SR 14 split at the interchange as SR 14 turns south to join SR 43. SR 8 begins at the eastern terminus of the US 422/SR 14 overlap, forming a concurrency with US 422 along Woodland Avenue.

US 422 runs easterly along Woodland Avenue and Kinsman Road, through the Kinsman neighborhood. As it crosses Cleveland's city limits just west of Lee Road in Shaker Heights, the street name changes to Chagrin Boulevard, named for the Chagrin River and Chagrin Falls (the eastern terminus of the boulevard) in Cleveland's eastern suburbs. Today, US 422 in Shaker Heights and Beachwood, where it now merges with I-271, is almost a linear edge city, with millions of square feet in office space centered on this corridor. It is one of the busiest streets in Cuyahoga County and Greater Cleveland. It serves as the primary commercial district for the wealthiest pocket of communities in Northeast Ohio.

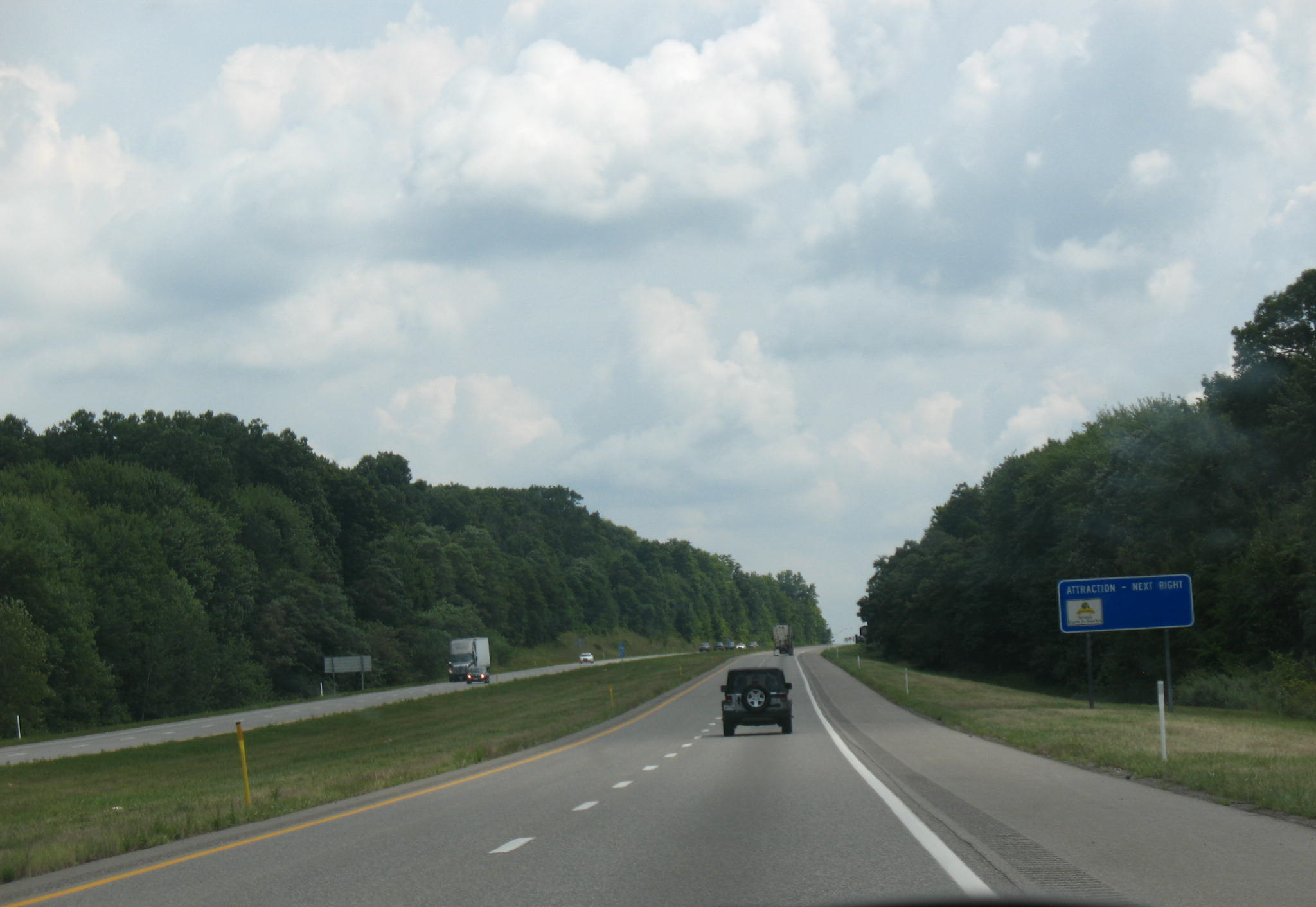
The US 422 freeway west of the SR 44 interchange in Auburn Township

At Northfield Road, SR 8 turns to the south, leaving US 422 to continue east along Chagrin Boulevard. Two miles east of SR 8 in Beachwood, US 422 intersects SR 87 and SR 175, running concurrent with the former for two blocks to I-271 exit 29. Here, US 422 departs SR 87 and Chagrin Boulevard at the southbound ramp to I-271 and joins the expressway southward for 2.5 miles (4.0 km). At Exit 27, US 422 splits from I-271 and proceeds through the eastern suburbs of Cleveland as a limited-access highway, exiting Cuyahoga County and entering Geauga County.

In Auburn Township, US 422 returns to grade-level upon crossing the LaDue Reservoir. The route continues to the southeast, cutting through northeast Portage County and then entering Trumbull County, where US 422 runs through the center of Warren and Girard. The section from downtown Warren to SR 46 is known as "The Strip" and is lined with shopping centers, fast-food restaurants and other retail establishments, including the Eastwood Mall. In the 1960s and 1970s, nightclubs along The Strip attracted top-name entertainers.

Farther southeast, US 422 enters Youngstown and Mahoning County before entering Pennsylvania.

==== Pennsylvania ====
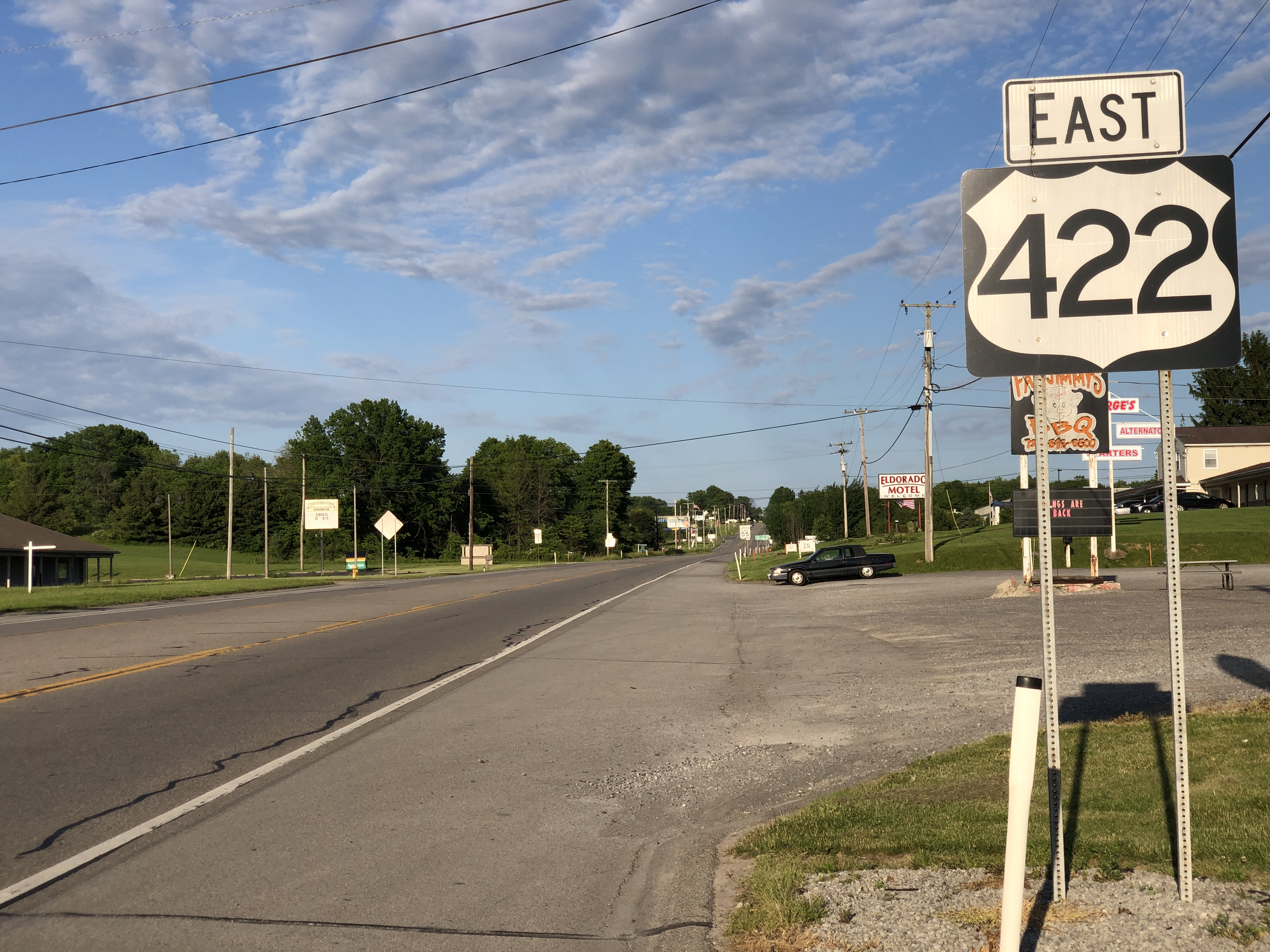
US 422 eastbound past US 422 Bus. east of New Castle

US 422 enters Pennsylvania eight miles (13 km) northwest of New Castle. Three miles northwest of New Castle the route spurs off to bypass New Castle running along with I-376. I-376 spurs off and becomes a toll road, while US 422 continues onward to where it becomes a two-lane road with a center lane three miles southwest of New Castle. The route continues to the east where it meets with US 19 and adjacent I-79. The road becomes an expressway again after its intersection with I-79 through Moraine State Park. The expressway ends just north of Prospect by the Big Butler Fairgrounds. It proceeds further for seven miles to where it becomes an expressway bypassing Butler, and ending in East Butler. It continues on for fifteen miles, becoming an expressway again to bypass Kittanning, where it meets with the Allegheny Valley Expressway (PA 28) at the northern terminus of that expressway. At this point, PA 28 joins US 422 in a concurrency. US 422/PA 28 crosses over the Allegheny River and PA 66 joins US 422 and PA 28 on the expressway. At the east end of the expressway, PA 28/PA 66 splits to the north and US 422 becomes a two-lane highway with a center lane. It continues in this way for eighteen miles to where it bypasses Indiana, where it junctions with US 119. The expressway continues for eight miles to where the expressway ends north of Yellow Creek State Park, becoming a two-lane highway. It continues like this for sixteen miles, until just before its terminus at US 219 near Ebensburg.

=== Eastern segment ===
==== Dauphin and Lebanon counties ====
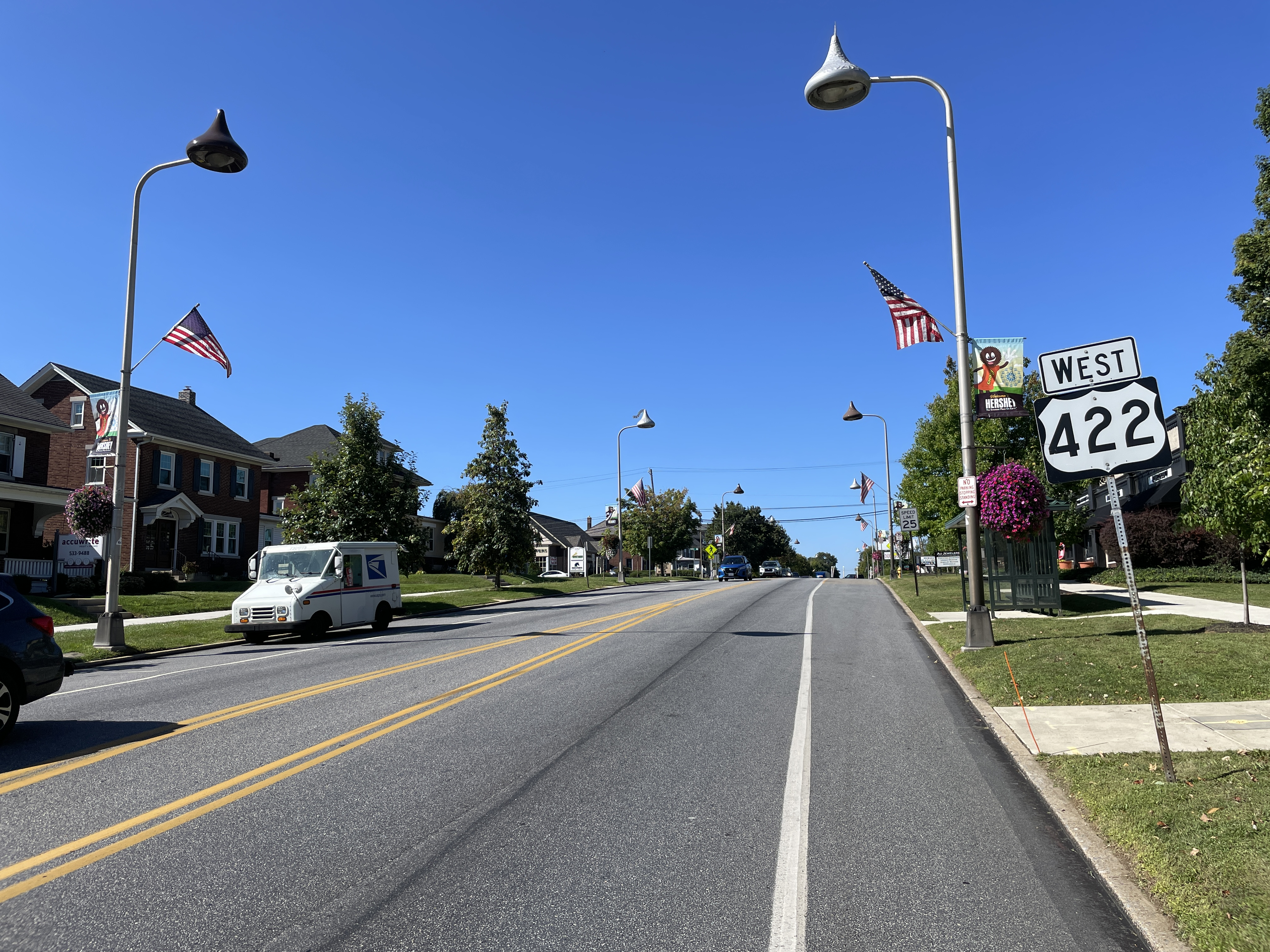
US 422 westbound on Chocolate Avenue in Hershey

The eastern section of US 422 begins at a partial cloverleaf interchange with US 322 and the eastern terminus of PA 39 east of the borough of Hummelstown in Derry Township, Dauphin County, heading northeast as a four-lane freeway that soon ends and becomes an at-grade divided highway called West Chocolate Avenue. The road passes commercial development along with some farm fields and residential development as it heads into the community of Hershey. The route heads into a mix of homes and businesses and turns east-northeast, where it narrows to a two-lane undivided road. At this point, West Chocolate Avenue becomes lined with street lamps that are shaped like Hershey's Kisses. US 422 continues along West Chocolate Avenue and comes to an intersection with PA 743 at Cocoa Avenue in the center of Hershey. At this point, the route becomes East Chocolate Avenue, a three-lane divided with two eastbound lanes and one westbound lane that passes southeast of the site of the original Hershey Chocolate factory. The road becomes undivided, still with two eastbound lanes and one westbound lane, and passes near a few residences and businesses as it heads between the Hershey Country Club to the north and Spring Creek Golf Course to the south, narrowing to two lanes. US 422 runs past more residential and commercial development, leaving Hershey and heading through the community of Palmdale.

US 422 enters the borough of Palmyra in Lebanon County and becomes West Main Street, running past homes and a few businesses. The route heads into the downtown area and the name changes to East Main Street at the Railroad Street intersection. The road runs past residences before it passes through commercial areas and comes to an intersection with the northern terminus of PA 117. US 422 gains a center left-turn lane and continues past businesses, leaving Palmyra for North Londonderry Township and becoming Benjamin Franklin Parkway. The route bends east and passes between businesses to the north and residential development to the south before it heads into farmland and crosses Killinger Creek, where it becomes the border between North Annville Township to the north and South Annville Township to the south as West Main Street. The road heads through agricultural areas with some woods, homes, and businesses, crossing the Quittapahilla Creek into Annville Township. At this point, US 422 heads east as a two-lane road that is lined with homes. In the commercial center of Annville, the route crosses PA 934 and becomes East Main Street, heading south of the Lebanon Valley College campus. The road continues east past residential areas with a few businesses, gaining a center left-turn lane. US 422 heads into the borough of Cleona and becomes West Penn Avenue, heading past homes and commercial establishments. The route becomes East Penn Avenue at the Center Street intersection and runs through more developed areas, becoming the border between Cleona to the north and North Cornwall Township to the south. The road becomes the boundary between North Lebanon Township to the north and North Cornwall Township to the south and the name changes to Cumberland Street. US 422 heads east past businesses and passes to the south of the Lebanon Valley Mall. The route runs along the border between West Lebanon Township to the north and North Cornwall Township to the south as it continues through commercial areas with a few homes.

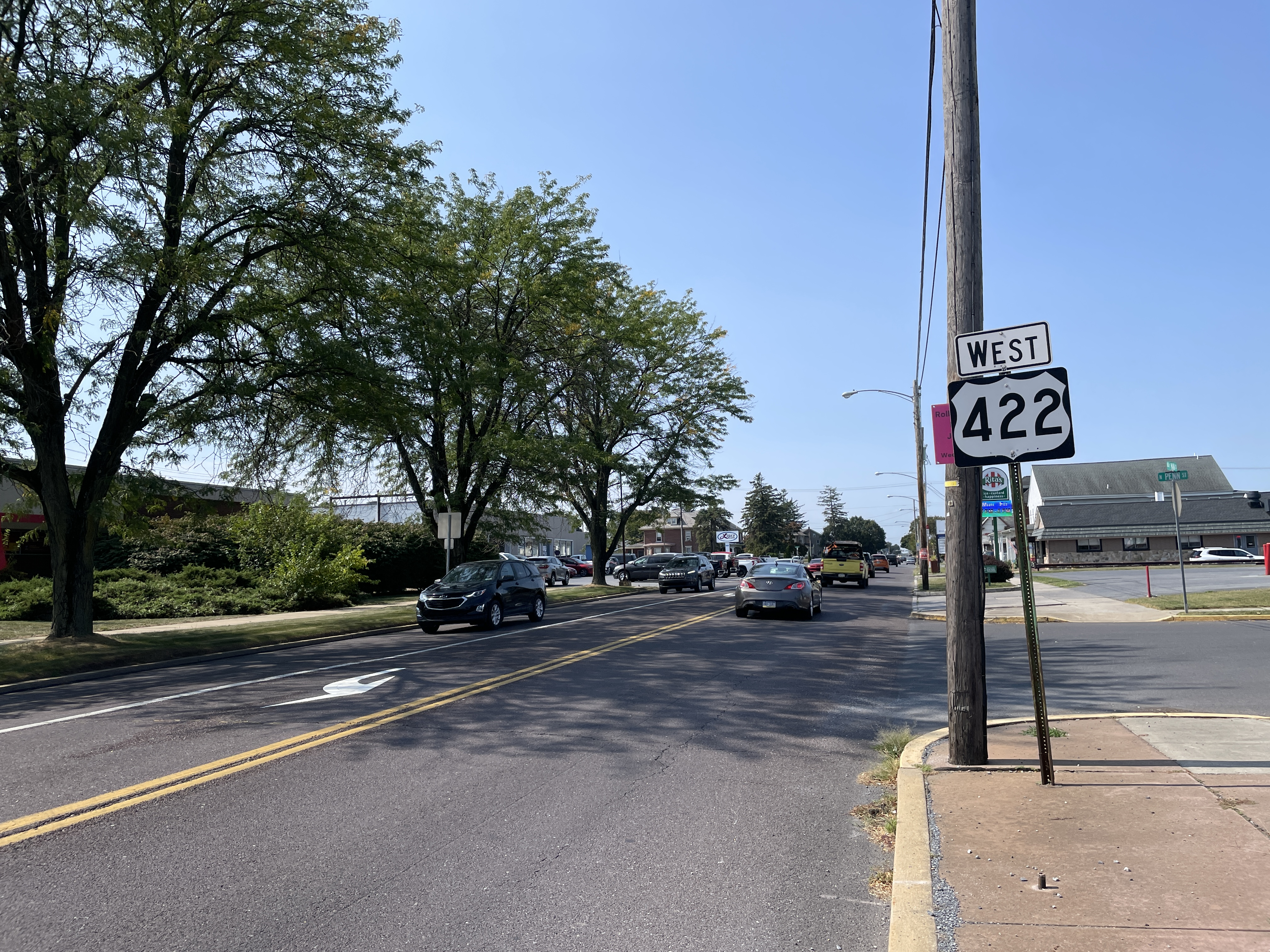
US 422 westbound past PA 117 in Palmyra

US 422 enters the city of Lebanon at the 16th Street intersection, where it becomes a four-lane undivided road that passes commercial development and encounters an abandoned railroad line at the north end of the Lebanon Valley Rail Trail. At 12th Street, the route crosses Quittapahilla Creek and splits into a one-way pair following Cumberland Street westbound and Walnut Street eastbound, with each street carrying two lanes of traffic. US 422 continues east past urban rowhouses along with a few businesses, intersecting the southbound direction of PA 72 at 10th Street and the northbound direction of PA 72 at 9th Street. The westbound direction heads through the downtown area of Lebanon, passing south of the Harrisburg Area Community College Lebanon Campus, while the eastbound direction heads through residential areas to the south of downtown. Farther east, US 422 passes urban areas of homes and businesses in the eastern part of Lebanon, with the eastbound direction passing north of WellSpan Good Samaritan Hospital. On the eastern border of Lebanon, the route comes to an intersection with the northern terminus of PA 897. At this, westbound US 422 becomes the border between Lebanon to the north and South Lebanon Township to the south, briefly becoming a three-lane divided highway with two westbound lanes and one eastbound lane between PA 897 and North 5th Avenue before becoming a one-way road again, while eastbound US 422 fully enters South Lebanon Township, heading past residential areas in the community of Hebron. Eastbound US 422 turns north and passes businesses, crossing Quittapahilla Creek and rejoining westbound US 422 at East Cumberland Street. At this point, US 422 heads northeast as four-lane undivided East Cumberland Street past businesses, passing through a corner of Lebanon before entering North Lebanon Township and coming to a bridge over Norfolk Southern's Harrisburg Line as it passes north of the community of Avon. The route becomes a three-lane road with a center left-turn lane and runs along the border between North Lebanon Township to the northwest and South Lebanon Township to the southeast, heading through residential areas in the community of Avon Heights. The road heads into a mix of farmland and residential and commercial development. US 422 enters Jackson Township and becomes West Lincoln Avenue, crossing the Tulpehocken Creek and continuing through agricultural areas with some homes and businesses. The route heads into business areas and enters the borough of Myerstown, where it reaches an intersection with the southern terminus of PA 645. The road becomes a four-lane divided highway and crosses PA 501 before becoming East Lincoln Avenue at the Railroad Street intersection. US 422 leaves Myerstown for Jackson Township again and becomes a three-lane road with a center turn lane, heading east through farmland with some commercial development. The road intersects Wintersville Road/Millardsville Road, where it briefly become a divided highway before regaining a center left-turn lane.

==== Berks County ====
US 422 crosses into Marion Township in Berks County and becomes Conrad Weiser Parkway, passing through farm fields with some residences and businesses. The route runs past homes and businesses in the community of Stouchsburg before it runs through more agricultural areas with some development, bending to the east-southeast. The road becomes three lanes with two westbound lanes and one eastbound lane, crossing the Tulpehocken Creek into the borough of Womelsdorf. Here, US 422 turns into a four-lane divided highway and passes businesses as it comes to an intersection with PA 419. The route continues southeast near residential areas before it leaves Womelsdorf for Heidelberg Township and passes to the north of the Conrad Weiser Homestead. US 422 heads east-southeast as West Penn Avenue, a three-lane road with a center turn lane that heads through rural areas with residential and commercial development. The road runs a short distance to the north of Norfolk Southern's Harrisburg Line before it enters the borough of Robesonia. Here, the route runs along two-lane West Penn Avenue and is lined with homes and a few businesses. US 422 becomes East Penn Avenue at the Robeson Street intersection and passes more development. The road heads back into Heidelberg Township and gains a center left-turn lane, heading southeast past commercial development and to the south of Conrad Weiser High School. The route passes through a corner of Lower Heidelberg Township and becomes West Penn Avenue, soon forming the boundary between Lower Heidelberg Township to the northeast and South Heidelberg Township to the southwest. US 422 passes through farmland with some homes and businesses before it enters the borough of Wernersville. Here, the route becomes two-lane West Penn Avenue and passes through residential areas with a few businesses. The road becomes East Penn Avenue in the commercial center of town and continues east past more homes. US 422 leaves Wernersville and once again follows the border between Lower Heidelberg Township to the north and South Heidelberg Township to the south along Penn Avenue. The road gains a center turn lane and runs through agricultural areas with some residences and commercial establishments. The route crosses the Cacoosing Creek into the borough of Sinking Spring and becomes two lanes, following Penn Avenue past a mix of homes and businesses. In the eastern part of Sinking Spring, US 422 widens to four lanes and comes to an intersection with the western terminus of PA 724. Past this intersection, the road becomes three lanes with a center turn lane and continues through residential and commercial areas, leaving Sinking Spring for Spring Township, where it passes through the community of Springmont. The route continues east through developed areas and heads through the community of West Lawn. US 422 enters the borough of Wyomissing and widens to a four-lane divided highway. Here, it comes to an interchange with the US 222 freeway and the western terminus of US 422 Bus., which continues east along Penn Avenue.

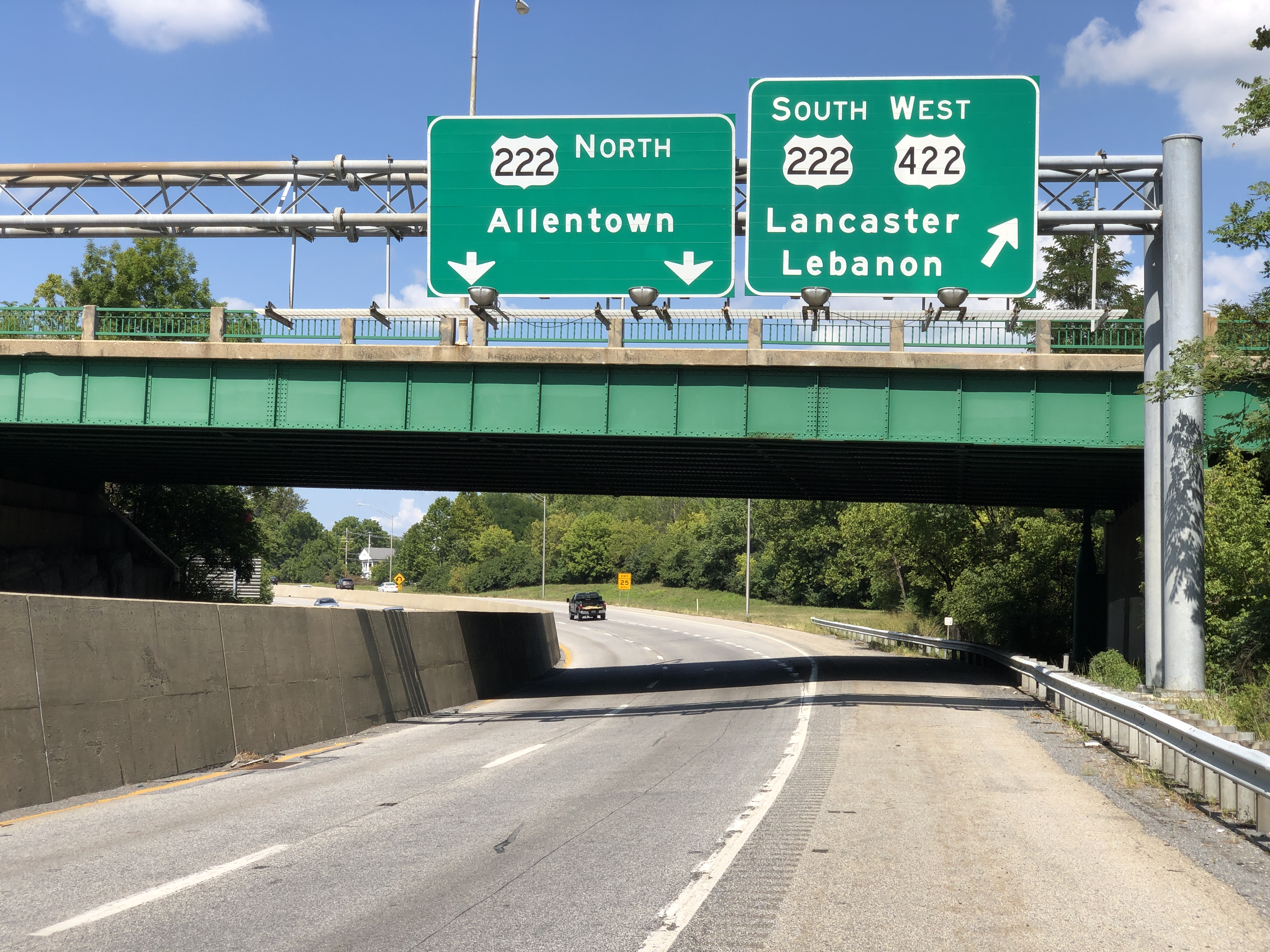
US 422 westbound approaching US 222 in Wyomissing

At this interchange, US 422 becomes concurrent with US 222, and the two routes continue east-northeast along the six-lane Warren Street Bypass, a freeway that runs between residential areas to the northwest and Norfolk Southern's Harrisburg Line to the southeast. The freeway curves north into business areas and comes to a partial cloverleaf interchange with State Hill Road. Following this, US 222/US 422 passes between the Berkshire Mall to the west and commercial areas to the east before it reaches an interchange with Paper Mill Road and Crossing Drive, where it curves to the northeast and runs near more businesses. The freeway comes to an interchange where US 222 splits to the northwest, US 422 immediately afterward splits southeast along the West Shore Bypass, and, straight ahead, PA 12 begins northeast along the Warren Street Bypass. Following this interchange, US 422 heads southeast along the West Shore Bypass, a four-lane freeway that runs between residential areas to the southwest and the Tulpehocken Creek to the northeast. The road passes under Norfolk Southern's Reading Line and comes to a diamond interchange with North Wyomissing Boulevard. The route follows the west bank of the Schuylkill River as it continues southeast and passes under Norfolk Southern's Harrisburg Line #2, crossing into the borough of West Reading. US 422 runs between the river to the northeast and Norfolk Southern's Harrisburg Line #1 to the southwest before reaching a cloverleaf interchange with US 422 Bus. Following this, the freeway heads south between the Schuylkill River to the east and industrial areas to the west, passing through a small exclave of Cumru Township and crossing over the Schuylkill River Trail. The road curves southeast and crosses Wyomissing Creek into the city of Reading, where it runs along the riverbank and comes to an interchange with US 222 Bus. that has left exits and entrances. From here, the route heads southeast between wooded areas near the Schuylkill River to the northeast and the Schuylkill River Trail and urbanized areas to the southwest. The freeway turns east and crosses the river into Cumru Township, where it passes through woodland and comes to a bridge over Norfolk Southern's Harrisburg Line. US 422 crosses the Schuylkill River again and reaches a trumpet interchange with the northern terminus of I-176. The road crosses the river a third time and enters Exeter Township, passing over Norfolk Southern's Harrisburg Line #2 and running between residential areas to the north and industrial areas to the south before reaching an eastbound exit and westbound entrance with Neversink Road that provides access to the borough of Mount Penn. From here, US 422 passes near more development before it comes to a westbound exit and eastbound entrance with the eastern terminus of US 422 Bus., at which point the freeway ends.

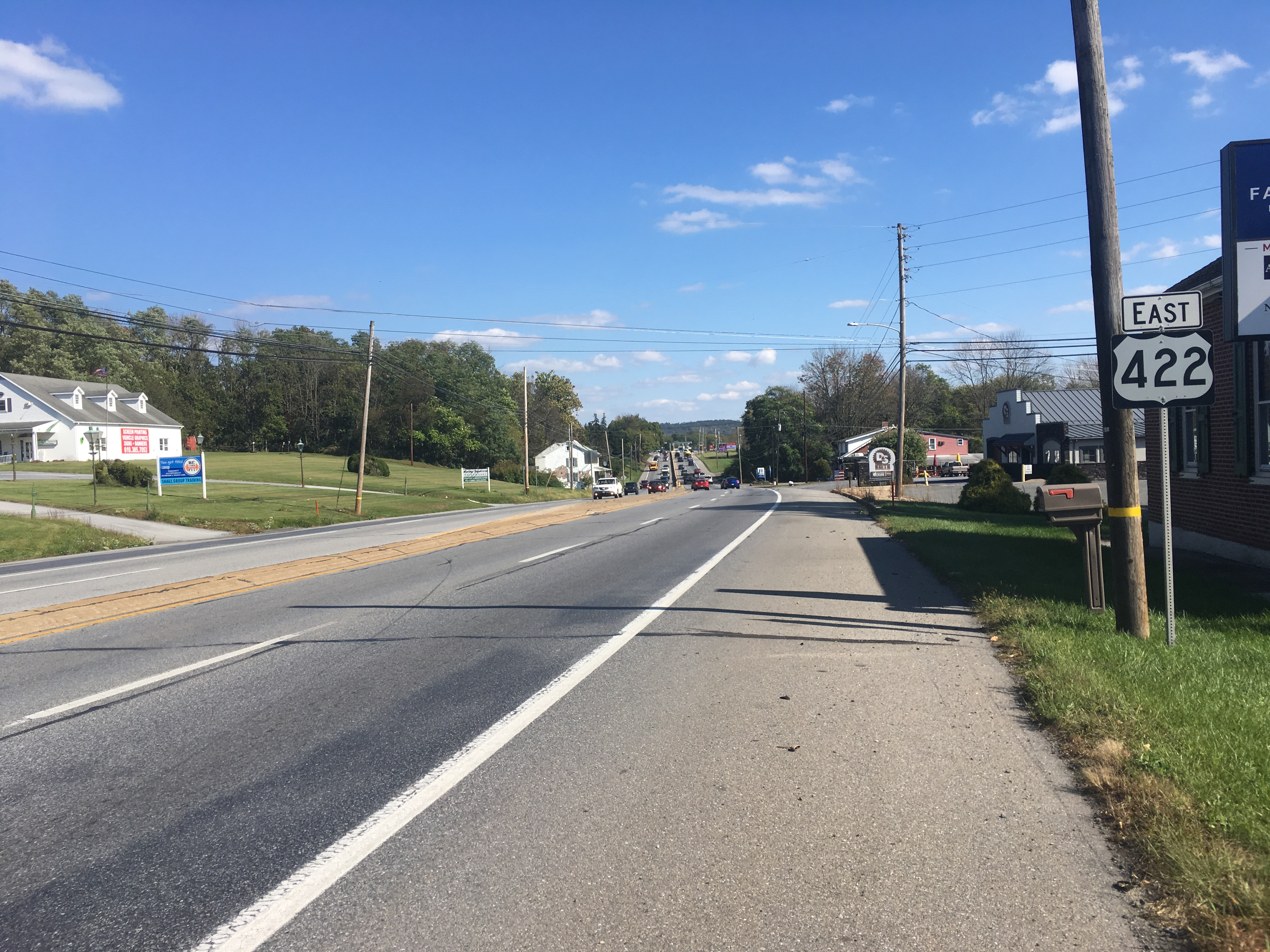
US 422 eastbound in Douglassville

From here, US 422 heads southeast as Perkiomen Avenue, a four-lane divided highway with occasional jughandles that is lined with businesses. The route passes north of the community of Lorane as it continues through suburban residential and commercial development, crossing Antietam Creek. The road runs southeast through a mix of woodland and development before the eastbound and westbound lanes split as it reaches an intersection with the northern terminus of PA 345 in the community of Baumstown. Following this intersection, US 422 continues east as a one-way pair through wooded areas with some residences and businesses, crossing into Amity Township. Both directions of the route rejoin and the route heads southeast as four-lane divided Benjamin Franklin Highway, crossing Monocacy Creek and passing farm fields before running through wooded areas with some commercial development. The road passes south of a residential development before the eastbound and westbound lanes split again, running a short distance to the north of Norfolk Southern's Harrisburg Line. US 422 curves southeast and heads into businesses areas, coming to an intersection with the southern terminus of PA 662 in the community of Douglassville. Following this, the route curves to the east before both directions rejoin. US 422 splits from Benjamin Franklin Highway by heading southeast onto a four-lane freeway called the Pottstown Bypass at an eastbound exit and westbound entrance. Benjamin Franklin Highway continues east and the road runs through the borough of Pottstown as High Street before becoming Ridge Pike east of Pottstown. Past the split with Benjamin Franklin Highway, the freeway passes over Norfolk Southern's Harrisburg Line and the Schuylkill River Trail before it enters Douglass Township and heads east-southeast through wooded areas to the north of the Schuylkill River.

==== Montgomery and Chester counties ====
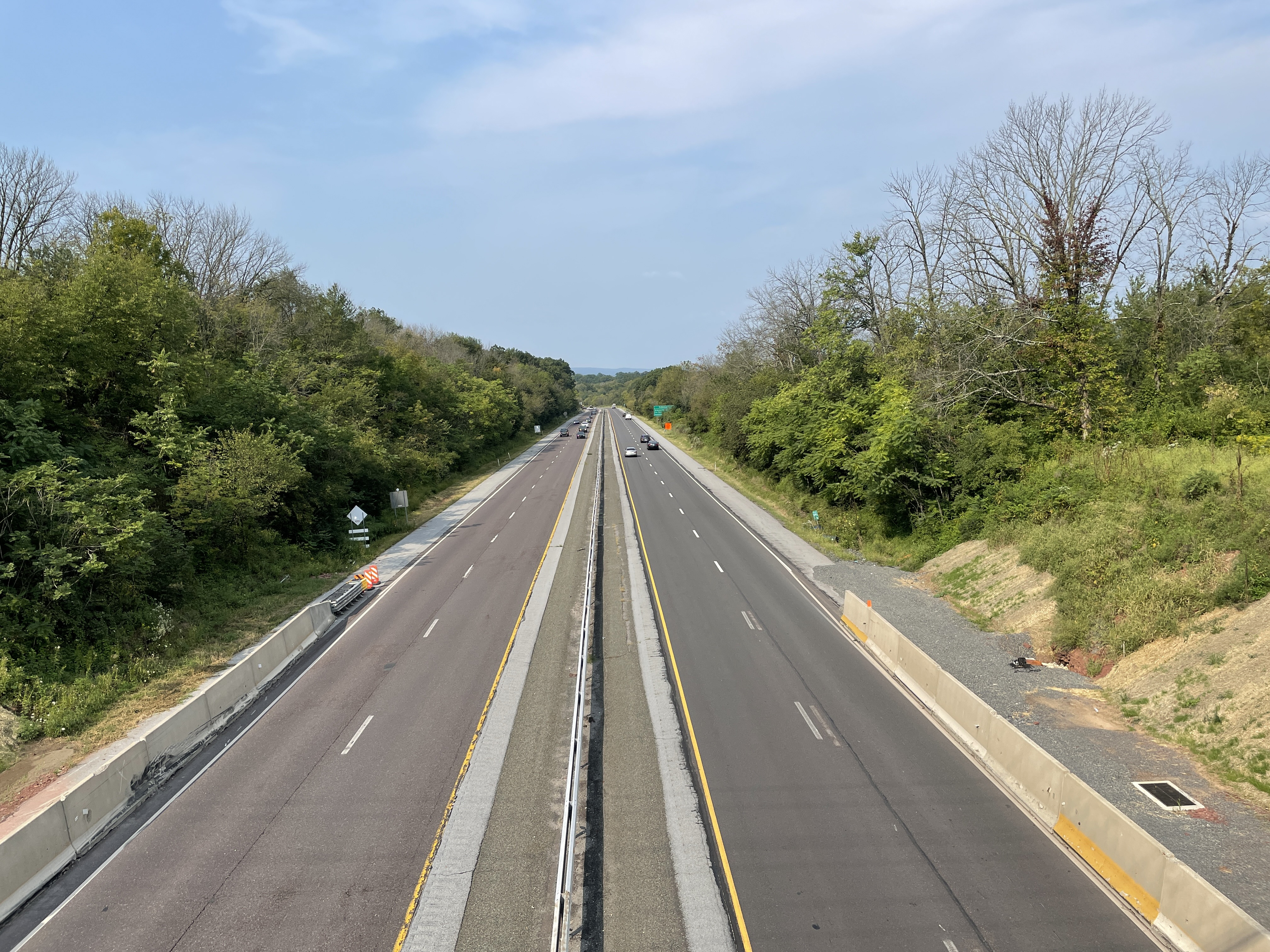
US 422 westbound in Sanatoga

US 422 enters West Pottsgrove Township in Montgomery County and comes to an interchange with Grosstown Road that provides access to the community of Stowe. The freeway curves northeast and continues to follow the Schuylkill River before it turns east and passes through a corner of the borough of Pottstown prior to crossing the river. At this point, the route enters North Coventry Township in Chester County and runs between woods to the north and farm fields to the south before passing near development and coming to a cloverleaf interchange with PA 100. Past this interchange, the road heads through the community of South Pottstown, which is across the river from the borough of Pottstown, and comes to a westbound exit and eastbound entrance with South Hanover Street. US 422 passes through woodland and reaches an eastbound exit and westbound entrance at Keim Street. A short distance later, the route comes to a trumpet interchange connecting to PA 724 to the south in the community of Kenilworth. From here, the road turns northeast and crosses the Schuylkill River into Lower Pottsgrove Township in Montgomery County, reaching a diamond interchange with Armand Hammer Boulevard in an industrial area. The freeway passes over Norfolk Southern's Pottstown Industrial Track and Harrisburg Line before running near residential and commercial development and turning to the east. US 422 heads between the community of Sanatoga to the north and woodland to the south before it reaches a partial cloverleaf interchange with Evergreen Road that provides access to Sanatoga. This interchange marks the end of the Pottstown Bypass designation of the US 422 freeway.

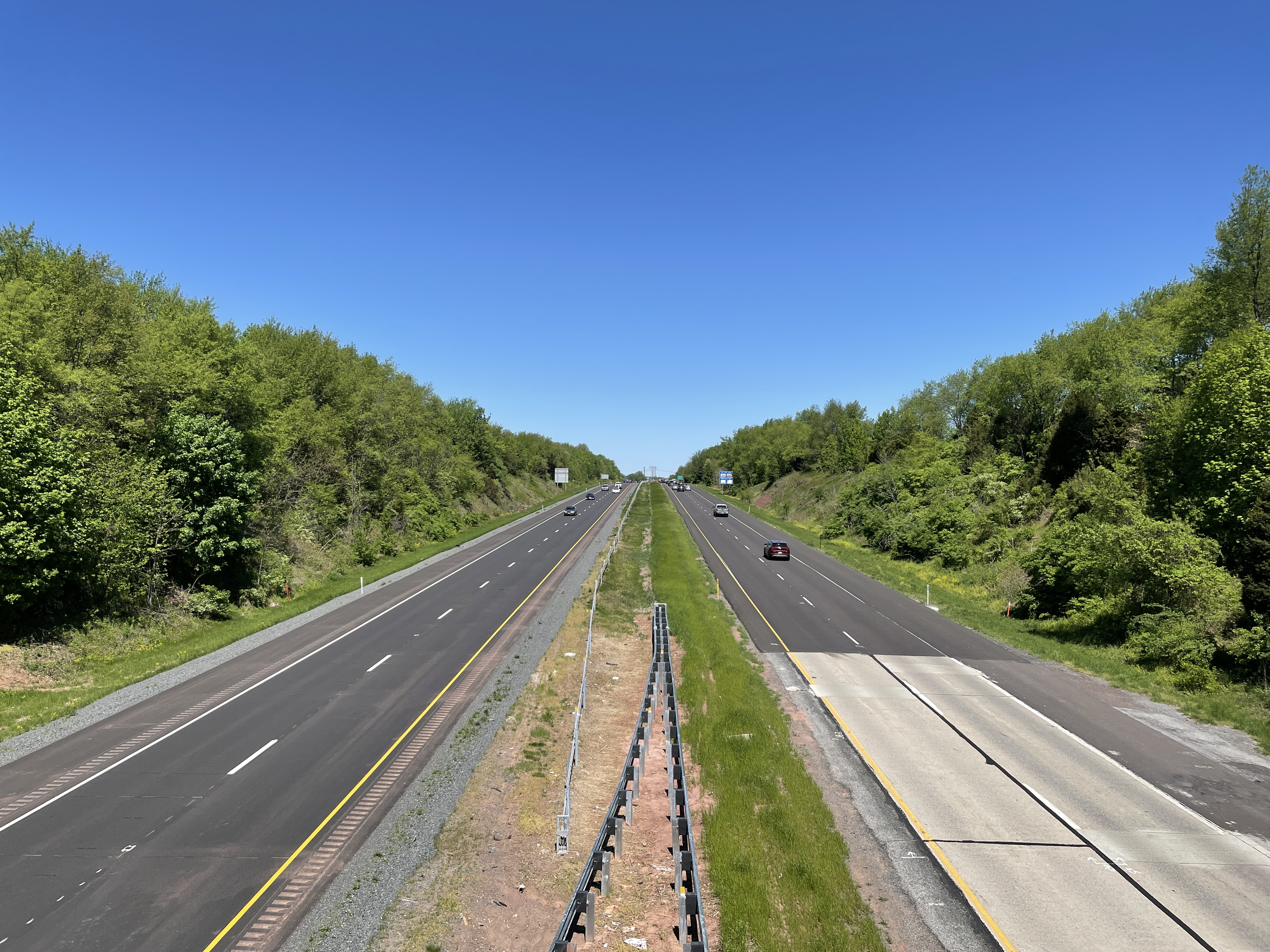
US 422 westbound in Limerick Township

From here, the four-lane US 422 freeway continues southeast as the Pottstown Expressway into Limerick Township and passes between the Philadelphia Premium Outlets to the southwest and Heritage Field Airport to the northeast, with the Limerick Generating Station, a nuclear power plant, located further to the southwest. The road runs near a mix of farmland and residential and commercial development, coming to a diamond interchange with Lewis Road that provides access to the communities of Limerick and Linfield. A park and ride lot is located within the southwest quadrant of this interchange. The route continues near more suburban development and reaches a diamond interchange with Township Line Road in a commercial area that serves the borough of Trappe to the northeast and the borough of Royersford to the southwest. Past this interchange, the freeway enters Upper Providence Township and continues southeast past suburban housing developments. US 422 passes over PA 113 without an interchange before coming to a partial cloverleaf interchange with PA 29 that serves the borough of Collegeville to the northeast and the borough of Phoenixville the southwest. The Providence Town Center lifestyle center is located along PA 29 north of this interchange. Following this interchange, the road runs near office parks before heading through wooded areas with some farm fields, with the median widening. The route passes near housing developments and office complexes before the median narrows and it curves to the south. The freeway comes to a partial cloverleaf interchange with Egypt Road in the community of Oaks. From here, US 422 passes between a commercial area that includes the 422 Business Center office park (where the American Treasure Tour is located) and the Greater Philadelphia Expo Center to the west and the Lower Perkiomen Valley Park to the east.

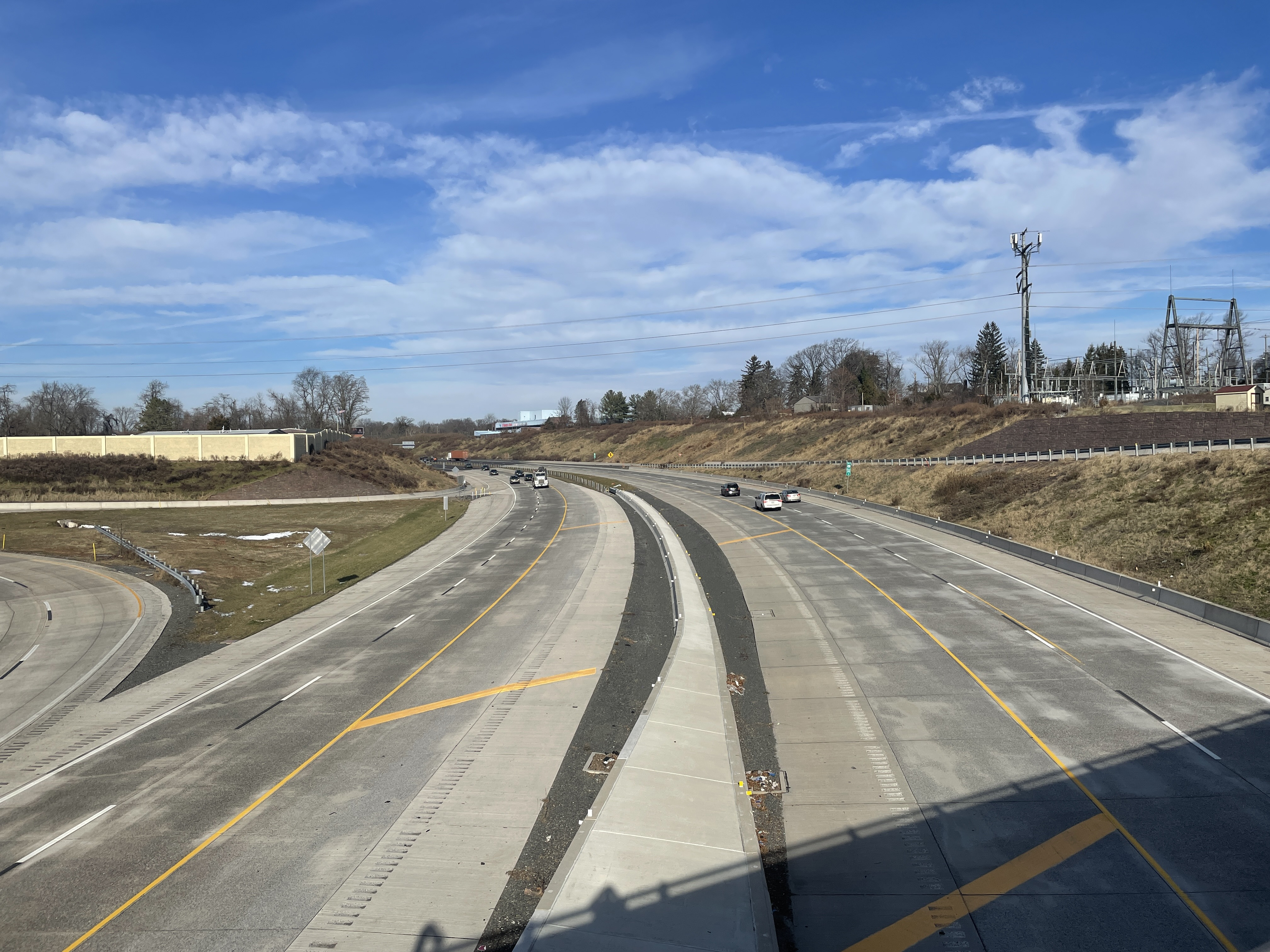
US 422 westbound at the PA 363 interchange in Audubon

The road crosses the Perkiomen Trail and the Perkiomen Creek into Lower Providence Township and becomes parallel to the Schuylkill River Trail to the west, making a sharp turn to the east and passing through woods and fields within Valley Forge National Historical Park. The route comes to a partial cloverleaf interchange with the southern terminus of PA 363 that provides access to the communities of Audubon and Trooper, where it enters West Norriton Township and makes a turn to the south, gaining a third auxiliary lane in each direction. US 422 heads over the Schuylkill River Trail before it crosses the Schuylkill River on the Schuylkill River Crossing Complex east of the parallel Sullivan's Bridge into Upper Merion Township, where it becomes the County Line Expressway. The freeway passes over Norfolk Southern's Harrisburg Line before reaching a partial cloverleaf interchange with PA 23 to the east of the Visitor Center at Valley Forge National Historical Park. From here, the route heads into the community of King of Prussia as a four-lane freeway and passes to the west of business parks and the Valley Forge Casino Resort, coming to an eastbound exit and entrance with First Avenue that serves the business parks and the casino. At this point, the road enters Tredyffrin Township in Chester County and runs a short distance west of the border with Upper Merion Township in Montgomery County. The freeway passes under the Pennsylvania Turnpike (I-76) and heads near commercial areas west of the Village at Valley Forge, a residential and retail development which contains the King of Prussia Town Center lifestyle center. US 422 comes to its eastern terminus at a trumpet interchange with the US 202 freeway that also has ramps connecting to Swedesford Road and I-76 eastbound to the city of Philadelphia. US 202 northbound provides access from US 422 to I-76 westbound and the Pennsylvania Turnpike at the western terminus of I-276 at the Valley Forge Interchange along with the King of Prussia Mall.

== History ==
=== Western segment ===
The western segment was first signed in 1926.

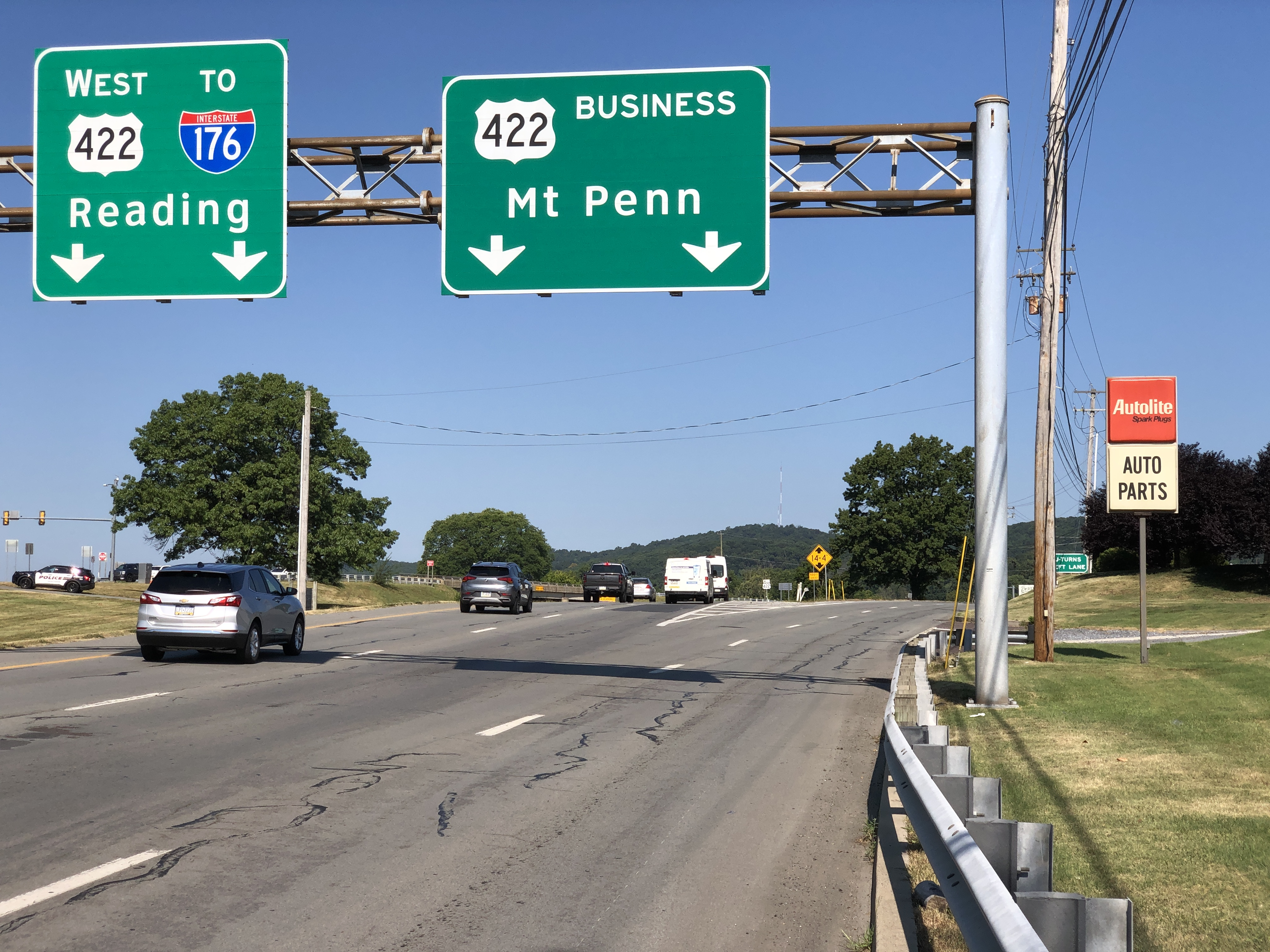
US 422 west at US 422 Bus. east of Reading

Most of the highway in Ohio still runs along its original alignment. The section in Parkman Township, Geauga County was twinned during World War II. The four-lane divided highway was extended to Warren by 1950.

The expressway bypass of Butler was built in the early 1960s. Previously, the road ran through downtown Butler.

The section that runs through Moraine State Park near Butler was upgraded to expressway standards in 1969.

In 1971, an expressway bypass around downtown Youngstown opened.

In the 1970s, bypasses were built around the cities of New Castle, Kittanning, and Indiana. Sections of the Indiana bypass remained incomplete until 1995 and the Kittanning bypasses were completed in 2001. Part of the bypass in New Castle is now part of the Interstate Highway System, as an extension of I-376 runs concurrent with US 422 for 3 miles (4.8 km).

The divided highway portion of US 422 connecting downtown Solon to I-271 and I-480 was originally signed as US 422 Alternate. In December 1992, the freeway was extended eastward through Bainbridge Township across the LaDue Reservoir to SR 44 in Auburn Center, and US 422 was rerouted along I-271 and the former US 422 Alternate. The new freeway made US 422 a popular route for truckers and commuters and made the remaining two-lane portion in Geauga County particularly dangerous. The state has added traffic lights, rumble strips and extra width to the road to try to alleviate some of the danger. Prior to the realignment, US 422 originally ran along Chagrin Boulevard (formerly Kinsman Road) and Washington Street through Woodmere, Pepper Pike, Moreland Hills, Chagrin Falls, and Bainbridge Township.

=== Eastern segment ===
The eastern segment of US 422 was originally signed in 1927, running from US 22 in Reading to US 309 in the Chestnut Hill section of Philadelphia. The majority of the route from Pottstown to Philadelphia followed historic Ridge Pike and Germantown Pike (as of 2025, the overpass of Ridge Pike over the Pennsylvania Turnpike (I-276) is still labeled with a designation of "U.S. 422").

In 1932, the western terminus was extended from Reading to Market Street in downtown Harrisburg.

In 1958, plans were made to construct the West Shore Bypass, a bypass route around Reading running along the west shore of the Schuylkill River from the PA 12 intersection to Exeter Township. Following its completion in 1965, the US 422 designation was moved onto the bypass, and the former routing through the city was designated as US 422 Bus.

Additionally, the eastern terminus of the segment was extended to the Tacony–Palmyra Bridge in Tacony, Philadelphia, The eastern terminus was moved to US 1/US 13 in Hunting Park in 1961.

In 1967, the Pottstown Bypass was completed, an 8.4-mile-long (13.5 km) limited-access bypass route running from Douglassville to Sanatoga and bypassing Pottstown to the south. The US 422 designation was subsequently moved off of High Street in Pottstown and onto the new bypass. In the same year, the County Line Expressway was completed, a 2.5-mile-long (4.0 km) freeway running from Trooper Road (PA 363) in Audubon to US 202 near King of Prussia. Although the County Line Expressway was originally signed as PA 363, the Pottstown Expressway was planned to connect the Pottstown Bypass with the County Line Expressway and create a continuous freeway alignment of US 422 from Douglassville to King of Prussia. This freeway was planned as an extension to the Schuylkill Expressway, which ends in King of Prussia.

Construction on the Pottstown Expressway link began in sections in the early 1970s, with the first section between Lewis Road in Linfield and PA 29 being completed in 1978. Construction on the remaining links, however, were halted due to funding issues and delays as PennDOT experienced budget cuts in the late 1970s. Despite this, after the proposed I-895 freeway was cancelled in 1981, some of the funds were able to be used to complete the Pottstown Expressway. The section from PA 29 to the County Line Expressway was completed in 1984. Construction of this specific section experienced challenges in its routing, as the part of the route between Oaks and the County Line Expressway was planned to run near the historic properties of Mill Grove and Fatland in Audubon. At the time, the Fatland property was owned by politician Peter Camiel, who was also a member of the Pennsylvania Turnpike Commission. In order to avoid potential conflict with Camiel, this stretch of the highway was built around the Fatland property, raising the cost of the highway by $3 million. Because of this, as US 422 departs Oaks, instead of heading southeast towards the PA 363 interchange, the highway turns southwest then sharply curves due east to avoid Mill Grove and Fatland, before turning south to PA 363. This curve has been colloquially named the "Camiel Curve" in reference to Camiel, and also the "St. Gabe's Curve" on traffic reports due to the curve's proximity to St. Gabriel's Hall in Audubon. The sharpness of the curve has also caused it to be the site of several fatal crashes since the construction of the expressway.

The final portion of the Pottstown Expressway from the Pottstown Bypass to Lewis Road in Linfield opened in 1985, completing a continuous freeway from Douglassville to King of Prussia. As a result, the US 422 alignment was moved entirely onto the freeway, and the eastern terminus of the eastern segment was truncated nearly 15 miles west from Philadelphia to King of Prussia.

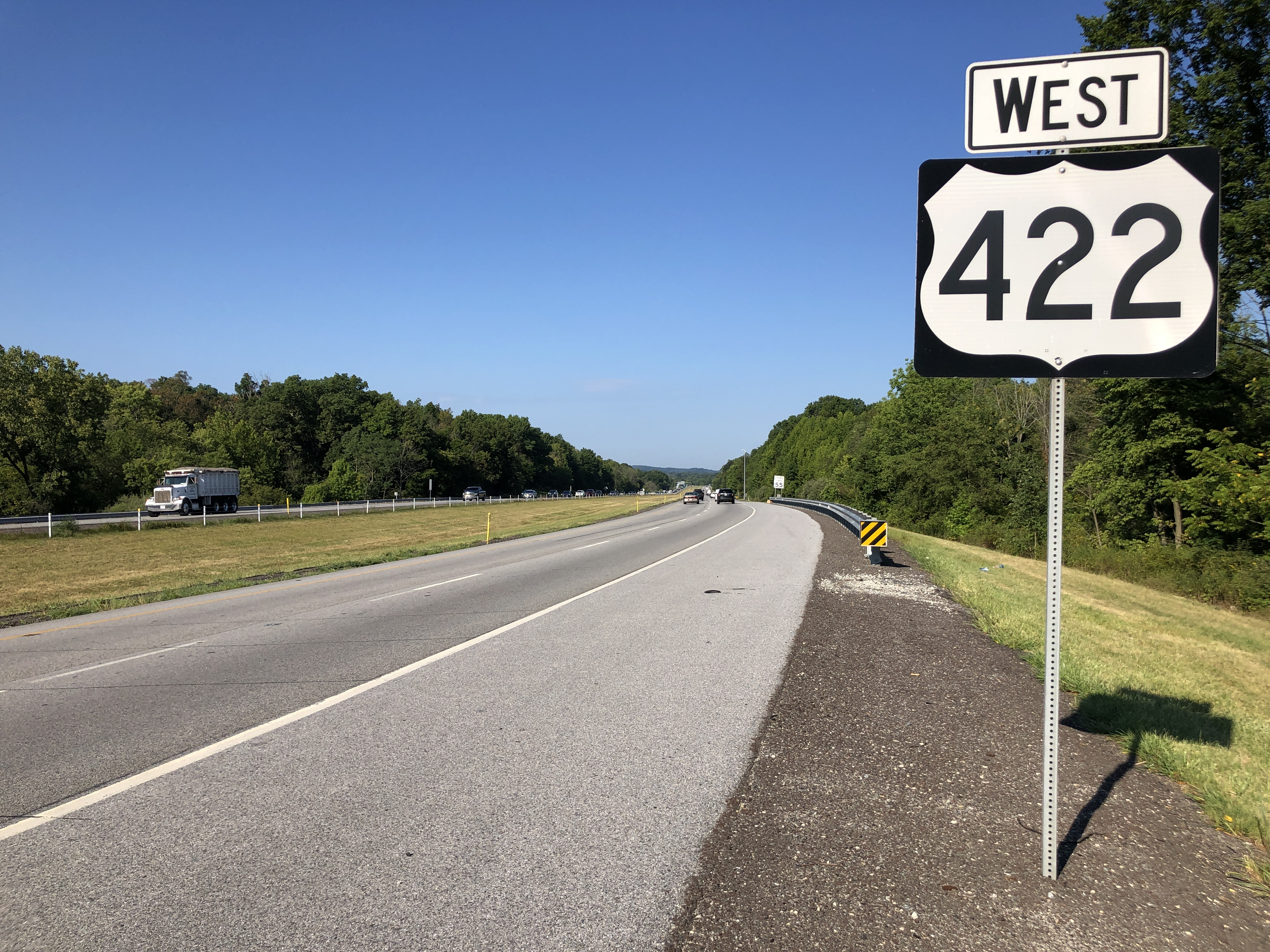
US 422 westbound past PA 363 in Audubon

The completion of the Pottstown Expressway considerably shorted travel times for Pottstown area residents travelling to the King of Prussia and Philadelphia areas, and the completion of the expressway caused for multiple communities located along the US 422 corridor to experience significant population growth beginning in the 1990s, with Limerick Township, Upper Providence Township, and the borough of Trappe seeing the most growth. As a result of the population growth, in the first decade of the 2000s, this segment of US 422 saw traffic volume increase by 50%. Volume reached 45,000 vehicles per day in Pottstown, and 110,000 vehicles per day at the Schuylkill River crossing between the PA 23 and PA 363 interchanges.

In 1999, the interchange area in King of Prussia at the eastern terminus of US 422 underwent a massive, $290 million reconstruction project. Due to the convergence of multiple major highways (US 202, I-76, and the Pennsylvania Turnpike) near the eastern terminus of US 422, the interchange area frequently suffered from heavy congestion. The project included construction of new ramps and the widening of all intersecting roadways, including US 422. On US 422, one specific cause of congestion was due to the fact that drivers travelling from US 422 eastbound to I-76 eastbound had to briefly enter onto US 202 before immediately exiting to I-76 westbound. This was the same issue for drivers travelling from I-76 eastbound to US 422 westbound. As a result, new collector-distributor ramps from US 422 eastbound to I-76 westbound, and from I-76 eastbound to US 422 westbound were constructed, allowing for a direct connection between US 422 and I-76 to be achieved. The project was completed in 2003.

On June 22, 2000, the section of US 422 between US 422 Bus. and Shelbourne Road, along with US 422 Bus. between PA 562 and the eastern terminus at US 422 in Exeter Township was designated by an act of the Pennsylvania General Assembly as the Albert Boscov Commemorative Highway, honoring Albert Boscov, the longtime CEO of department store chain Boscov's.

In 2009, a $12.2 million project funded by the American Recovery and Reinvestment Act of 2009 began to resurface and improve over four miles of US 422 between the Trappe/Royersford and PA 29 interchanges. The project was completed in 2010.

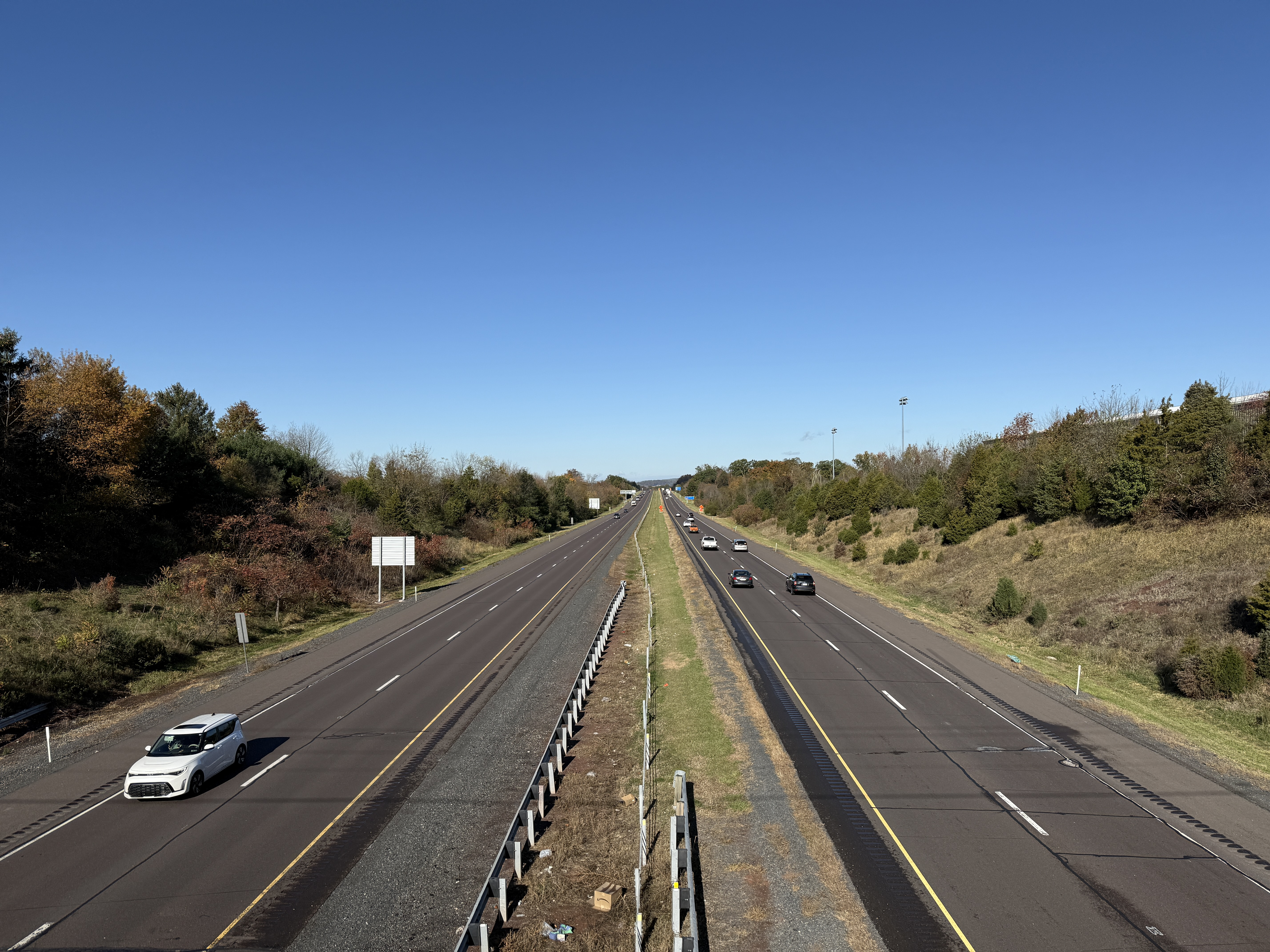
US 422 westbound in Limerick Township

As congestion continued to grow into the 2010s, local planning commissions created the "US 422 Corridor Master Plan". This plan detailed ways to address the future trends of traffic on US 422 through a set of sustainability programs, including: extending SEPTA's Manayunk/Norristown Line regional rail service to Wyomissing (a partial restoration of rail service between Norristown and Pottsville that SEPTA abruptly terminated in July 1981), widening US 422 to six lanes from the PA 29 interchange to the eastern terminus at US 202, and additional road improvements. The rail project, along with the improvements proposed, would be funded by tolling the highway. The tolls would be charged on a per-mile basis, and driving the entire segment between Pottstown and King of Prussia would cost $2. All tolls would be electronically collected via the E-ZPass system. The plan was debated in local municipalities in 2010, with many supporting the sustainability portions of the plan while strongly objecting to the charging of tolls. On October 5, 2011, after increasing pressure and opposition, the Delaware Valley Regional Planning Commission cancelled the tolling proposal and announced they would seek other means of funding the proposed projects.

In 2013, a $16.8 million project began to make the partial interchange with PA 363, which was originally a westbound exit and eastbound entrance, a full interchange by adding a ramp from PA 363 to westbound US 422 and from eastbound US 422 to PA 363. The new ramps opened to traffic on December 1, 2015.

The Schuylkill River crossing near Valley Forge had been a frequent source of congestion on this segment of US 422. Following the closure of another bridge over the river that ran parallel to US 422 in 1993, drivers travelling between PA 363 and PA 23 were forced to enter US 422, merge on to cross the river, then immediately exit at the next interchange, causing significant congestion in the area. Multiple proposals were made over the years to rebuild the former bridge, which was demolished in 1995. However, due to environmental concerns over the construction of the bridge, which would have been in close proximity to Valley Forge National Historical Park, no proposal ever moved forward. One fix was made when a third westbound lane between the PA 23 and PA 363 interchanges was constructed in January 2009. The project was completed by squeezing three westbound lanes onto the existing Schuylkill River crossing, shortening the lanes to 11 ft (3.4 m) and narrowing the median guard. The PA 23 interchange was also restructured in this project. Despite the widening of the highway, congestion still lingered in the area, and the issue of the age of the twin bridges began to arise, as they were built as part of the original County Line Expressway in the 1960s. As a result, in 2016, a $97 million project began to replace the bridges with a wider bridge, and to improve the PA 363 and PA 23 interchanges. The project was completed in October 2020, with the current bridge now including four mainline travel lanes and a weaving lane in each direction for direct access between PA 363 and PA 23.

Since 2012, a major reconstruction project of the original Pottstown Bypass segment of US 422 has been ongoing. The project has been divided into seven smaller projects, which includes repairing aging bridges, reconstructing interchanges, realigning US 422 near the Stowe interchange, and other improvements to the highway.

Attempting to relieve the growing congestion, the Schuylkill Valley Metro was proposed in 2000, which would have been a rail service connecting Philadelphia to Reading and paralleling US 422 from King of Prussia into Berks County. However, in 2006, Pennsylvania governor Ed Rendell announced that the project would not receive funding to move forward, and was considered dead. Although similar rail lines have since been proposed to relieve traffic on this segment of US 422 and have failed to move forward, the Schuylkill River Passenger Rail proposal has been actively in planning stages since 2021.

== Major intersections ==
State	County	Location	mi	km	Exit	Destinations	Notes
Ohio	Cuyahoga	Cleveland	0.00	0.00		US 6 / US 20 (Public Square) SR 8 begins / SR 14 begins / SR 43 begins / SR 87 begins	Western terminus; western terminus of SR 14/SR 87; northern terminus of SR 8/SR 43
Ohio	Cuyahoga	Cleveland	0.52	0.84		SR 10 west (Carnegie Avenue)	Western end of SR 10 concurrency
Ohio	Cuyahoga	Cleveland	0.59	0.95		I-90 (Innerbelt Freeway) to I-71	I-90 exit 171
Ohio	Cuyahoga	Cleveland	0.85	1.37		SR 14 east / SR 43 east (East 14th Street)	Eastern end of SR 14/SR 43 concurrency
Ohio	Cuyahoga	Cleveland	1.50	2.41		I-77 south (Willow Freeway) / SR 10 east – Akron	Eastern end of SR 10 concurrency; I-77 exit 162A
Ohio	Cuyahoga	Cleveland	2.36	3.80		SR 87 east (Woodland Avenue)	Eastern end of SR 87 concurrency
Ohio	Cuyahoga	Shaker Heights	8.78	14.13		SR 8 south (Northfield Road)	Eastern end of SR 8 concurrency
Ohio	Cuyahoga	Beachwood	10.76	17.32		SR 87 west / SR 175 (Richmond Road)	Western end of SR 87 concurrency
Ohio	Cuyahoga	Beachwood			West end of freeway		
Ohio	Cuyahoga	Beachwood	10.97– 11.21	17.65– 18.04		I-271 north – Erie, PA SR 87 east (West Chagrin Boulevard)	Eastern end of SR 87 concurrency, western end of I-271 concurrency; I-271 exit 29
Ohio	Cuyahoga	Orange	12.16	19.57	28B	Harvard Road	Exit numbers follow I-271
Ohio	Cuyahoga	Bedford Heights	13.09	21.07	28A	SR 175 (Richmond Road) / Emery Road	Eastbound exit and westbound entrance
Ohio	Cuyahoga	Bedford Heights	13.13	21.13	—	I-271 south to I-480 east – Columbus, Youngstown	Eastern end of I-271 concurrency; eastbound exit and westbound entrance; I-271 exit 27A
Ohio	Cuyahoga	Bedford Heights	13.13	21.13	13B	I-480 west – Cleveland, Toledo	Westbound exit and eastbound entrance; access via unsigned I-480N; signed as exit 27B eastbound
Ohio	Cuyahoga	Solon	16.14	25.97	16	Cochran Road / Harper Road	
Ohio	Cuyahoga	Solon	17.91	28.82	18	SR 91 – Solon, Moreland Hills	
Ohio	Geauga	Bainbridge Township	23.17	37.29	23	SR 306 / Bainbridge Road / Chagrin Road	
Ohio	Geauga	Auburn Township	29.56	47.57	29	SR 44 – Chardon, Ravenna	
Ohio	Geauga	Auburn Township			East end of freeway		
Ohio	Geauga	Troy Township	33.45	53.83		SR 700 (Claridon Troy Road) – Burton, Hiram	
Ohio	Geauga	Parkman Township	37.76	60.77		SR 88 / SR 168 north / SR 528 north (Main Street)	Southern terminus of SR 168/SR 528
Ohio	Geauga	Parkman Township	39.81	64.07		SR 282 south (Nelson Lodge Road)	Northern terminus of SR 282
Ohio	Portage	No major junctions					
Ohio	Trumbull	Southington Township	44.37	71.41		SR 305 – Cortland, Hiram	
Ohio	Trumbull	Southington Township	45.49	73.21		SR 534 – Newton Falls, West Farmington	
Ohio	Trumbull	Warren Township	50.34– 50.36	81.01– 81.05		SR 5 / SR 82 (Warren Outer Belt) – Ravenna, Sharon, PA	Interchange
Ohio	Trumbull	Warren	53.68	86.39		SR 45 (Todd Avenue)	
Ohio	Trumbull	Warren	54.71	88.05		SR 169 south (Niles Road SE)	Northern terminus of SR 169
Ohio	Trumbull	Niles	58.89	94.77		SR 46 (Niles Cortland Road)	
Ohio	Trumbull	Weathersfield Township	60.93	98.06		SR 169 north (Robbins Avenue)	Southern terminus of SR 169
Ohio	Trumbull	Girard	62.53	100.63		SR 304 east (Churchill Hubbard Road)	
Ohio	Trumbull	Girard	63.47– 63.51	102.15– 102.21		I-80 / SR 11 – Cleveland, New York City	I-80/SR 11 exit 227
Ohio	Mahoning	Youngstown	65.57	105.52		SR 711 to I-680 / SR 11 north / I-80 east – Cleveland, New York, Ashtabula	Interchange
Ohio	Mahoning	Youngstown			West end of freeway		
Ohio	Mahoning	Youngstown	66.63– 66.72	107.23– 107.38		SR 193 (Madison Avenue Expressway/Wirt Street) to I-680 – Pittsburgh, Cleveland SR 289 east (Martin Luther King Jr. Boulevard)	Western terminus of SR 289
Ohio	Mahoning	Youngstown	67.21– 67.42	108.16– 108.50		Belmont Avenue / Fifth Avenue – Downtown	
Ohio	Mahoning	Youngstown	67.91	109.29		Wick Avenue / Andrews Avenue – Youngstown State University	
Ohio	Mahoning	Youngstown	68.07– 68.45	109.55– 110.16		US 62 / SR 7 – Hubbard, Poland	
Ohio	Mahoning	Youngstown			East end of freeway		
Ohio	Mahoning	Youngstown	68.68	110.53		SR 289 west (North Lane Avenue/Oak Street)	Westbound direction of SR 289
Ohio	Mahoning	Youngstown–Coitsville Township line	72.36	116.45		SR 616 (Coitsville Hubbard Road/Struthers Coitsville Road)	
			74.92 0.000	120.57 0.000	Ohio–Pennsylvania state line		
Pennsylvania	Lawrence	Pulaski Township	0.021	0.034		PA 208 east (Marr Road)	Western terminus of PA 208
Pennsylvania	Lawrence	Mahoning Township	4.993	8.035		PA 551 (Edinburg Road)	
Pennsylvania	Lawrence	Union Township	7.145	11.499	West end of freeway		
Pennsylvania	Lawrence	Union Township	7.776– 8.458	12.514– 13.612	12	I-376 west – Sharon US 422 Bus. east (Sampson Street)	Western terminus of I-376 concurrency; western terminus of US 422 Bus.; access to US 422 west from I-376 east via Pulaski Road
Pennsylvania	Lawrence	Union Township	9.055– 9.548	14.573– 15.366	13	US 224 (State Street) – Poland, OH	
Pennsylvania	Lawrence	Union Township	10.077– 10.577	16.217– 17.022	15	I-376 Toll east to I-76 / Penna Turnpike – Pittsburgh	Eastern terminus of I-376 concurrency
Pennsylvania	Lawrence	Taylor Township	12.409– 12.545	19.970– 20.189		PA 168 (Moravia Street)	
Pennsylvania	Lawrence	Shenango Township	15.051– 15.405	24.222– 24.792		PA 65 (East Washington Street)	
Pennsylvania	Lawrence	Shenango Township	16.095– 16.284	25.902– 26.207		US 422 Bus. west – New Castle	Eastern terminus of US 422 Bus.
Pennsylvania	Lawrence	Shenango Township	16.206	26.081	East end of freeway		
Pennsylvania	Lawrence	Shenango Township	17.976	28.930		PA 388 – East Brook, Ellwood City	
Pennsylvania	Butler	Muddy Creek Township	22.797– 23.664	36.688– 38.084		US 19 (Perry Highway) – Mercer, Zelienople	Interchange
Pennsylvania	Butler	Muddy Creek Township	24.820– 25.110	39.944– 40.411		I-79 (Raymond P. Shaffer Highway) – Erie, Pittsburgh	Exit 96 (I-79)
Pennsylvania	Butler	Muddy Creek Township	25.110	40.411	West end of freeway		
Pennsylvania	Butler	Muddy Creek Township	25.220– 25.330	40.588– 40.765		North Shore	Access via West Park Road; serves Moraine State Park
Pennsylvania	Butler	Muddy Creek Township	27.442– 27.760	44.164– 44.675		South Shore	Access via Pleasant Valley Road; serves Moraine State Park
Pennsylvania	Butler	Franklin Township	30.761– 31.186	49.505– 50.189		PA 528 – Prospect	
Pennsylvania	Butler	Franklin Township	31.441	50.599	East end of freeway		
Pennsylvania	Butler	Franklin Township	32.654	52.552		PA 488 west (Main Street) / West Old Route 422 – Prospect, Portersville	Eastern terminus of PA 488
Pennsylvania	Butler	Butler Township	35.786	57.592	West end of freeway		
Pennsylvania	Butler	Butler Township	36.566– 36.860	58.847– 59.320		PA 356 south – Lyndora, Butler	Northern terminus of PA 356
Pennsylvania	Butler	Butler Township	39.450– 39.834	63.489– 64.107		PA 8 – Harrisville, Butler	
Pennsylvania	Butler	Summit Township	40.866– 41.163	65.767– 66.245		PA 68 (Jefferson Street)	To PA 38; southern terminus of PA 38
Pennsylvania	Butler	Summit Township	42.431– 42.585	68.286– 68.534		Mitchell Hill Road	
Pennsylvania	Butler	Summit Township	42.725	68.759	East end of freeway		
Pennsylvania	Armstrong	East Franklin Township	56.835	91.467	West end of freeway		
Pennsylvania	Armstrong	East Franklin Township	58.106– 58.237	93.513– 93.723		Nolte Drive / Pleasant Valley Drive	
Pennsylvania	Armstrong	East Franklin Township	58.489– 58.945	94.129– 94.863		PA 268 north / US 422 Bus. east – West Kittanning	Southern terminus of PA 268 and western terminus of US 422 Bus.
Pennsylvania	Armstrong	East Franklin Township	58.863– 59.356	94.731– 95.524		PA 28 south – Pittsburgh	Western terminus of PA 28 concurrency
Pennsylvania	Armstrong	Manor Township	61.258– 61.345	98.585– 98.725	A	PA 66 south – Ford City	Western terminus of PA 66 concurrency
Pennsylvania	Armstrong	Manor Township	61.599– 61.934	99.134– 99.673	B	To US 422 Bus. – Kittanning	
Pennsylvania	Armstrong	Manor Township	62.855– 63.253	101.155– 101.796		PA 28 north / PA 66 north – New Bethlehem US 422 Bus. west – Kittanning	Eastern terminus of PA 28 and PA 66 concurrencies; eastern terminus of US 422 Bus.
Pennsylvania	Armstrong	Manor Township	63.128	101.595	East end of freeway		
Pennsylvania	Armstrong	Plumcreek Township	75.228	121.068		PA 210 – Sagamore, Apollo	
Pennsylvania	Indiana	Shelocta	78.167	125.798		PA 56 west / PA 156 south – Avonmore, Apollo	Western terminus of PA 56 concurrency; northern terminus of PA 156
Pennsylvania	Indiana	Armstrong Township	82.427	132.653	West end of freeway		
Pennsylvania	Indiana	Armstrong Township	83.060– 83.414	133.672– 134.242		US 422 Bus. east (Philadelphia Street)	
Pennsylvania	Indiana	White Township	85.245– 85.727	137.189– 137.964		PA 286 (Oakland Avenue) PA 286 Truck begins	Western terminus of PA 286 Truck concurrency; to Indiana University of Pennsylvania
Pennsylvania	Indiana	White Township	87.661– 88.079	141.077– 141.749	A-B	US 119 / PA 56 east (PA 286 Truck north) – Blairsville, Punxsutawney	Split into exits A (US 119 south) and B (US 119 north); eastern terminus of PA 56 and PA 286 Truck concurrencies
Pennsylvania	Indiana	White Township	88.769– 89.255	142.860– 143.642		PA 954 (Sixth Street)	
Pennsylvania	Indiana	Cherryhill Township	93.823– 94.075	150.993– 151.399		Chestnut Ridge	Westbound entrance, eastbound exit; access via Chestnut Ridge Road
Pennsylvania	Indiana	Cherryhill Township	94.285	151.737		PA 553 east – Penn Run	Westbound entrance, eastbound exit; western terminus of PA 553
Pennsylvania	Indiana	Cherryhill Township	95.884	154.310	East end of freeway		
Pennsylvania	Indiana	Cherryhill Township	97.862	157.494		PA 259 south – Brush Valley	Northern terminus of PA 259
Pennsylvania	Indiana	Pine Township	102.496	164.951		PA 403 – Heilwood, Dilltown	
Pennsylvania	Cambria	Blacklick Township	106.122	170.787		PA 271 north (Duman Road) / South Street – Northern Cambria	Western terminus of PA 271 concurrency
Pennsylvania	Cambria	Blacklick Township	106.534– 106.549	171.450– 171.474		PA 271 south (Station Road) – Twin Rocks, Nanty Glo	Eastern terminus of PA 271 concurrency
Pennsylvania	Cambria	Cambria Township	112.742– 112.928	181.441– 181.740		US 219 to US 22 – Carrolltown, Johnstown, Hollidaysburg	Interchange; eastern terminus
Pennsylvania	Gap in route						
Pennsylvania	Dauphin	Derry Township	0.000– 0.157	0.000– 0.253		US 322 – Harrisburg, Campbelltown, Ephrata PA 39 west (Hersheypark Drive) – Attractions	Interchange; western terminus; eastern terminus of PA 39; no access from US 422 westbound to US 322 eastbound or from US 322 westbound to US 422 eastbound
Pennsylvania	Dauphin	Derry Township	2.397	3.858		PA 743 (Park Avenue / Cocoa Avenue)	
Pennsylvania	Lebanon	Palmyra	6.227	10.021		PA 117 south (South Forge Road)	Northern terminus of PA 117
Pennsylvania	Lebanon	Annville Township	10.223	16.452		PA 934 (White Oak Street)	
Pennsylvania	Lebanon	Lebanon	15.143	24.370		PA 72 south (10th Street) to Penna Turnpike	One-way pair
Pennsylvania	Lebanon	Lebanon	15.243	24.531		PA 72 north (9th Street)	One-way pair
Pennsylvania	Lebanon	Lebanon–South Lebanon Township line	16.443	26.462		PA 897 south (South 5th Avenue)	Northern terminus of PA 897 (at westbound US 422)
Pennsylvania	Lebanon	Myerstown	21.525	34.641		PA 645 north (North Locust Street) – Frystown	Southern terminus of PA 645
Pennsylvania	Lebanon	Myerstown	21.871	35.198		PA 501 (North College Street) – Bethel, Lancaster	
Pennsylvania	Berks	Womelsdorf	28.292	45.532		PA 419 (North 3rd Street) – Rehrersburg, Schaefferstown	
Pennsylvania	Berks	Sinking Spring	38.208	61.490		PA 724 east (Shillington Road) – Shillington	Western terminus of PA 724
Pennsylvania	Berks	Wyomissing	39.826	64.094		US 422 Bus. east (Penn Avenue) to US 222 south – Lancaster	Interchange; western terminus of US 422 Business; eastbound exit / westbound entrance only
Pennsylvania	Berks	Wyomissing	40.256	64.786	West end of freeway		
Pennsylvania	Berks	Wyomissing	40.463	65.119		US 222 south to US 422 Bus. (Penn Avenue east) – Lancaster	Western end of US 222 concurrency; northbound US 222 entrance / southbound US 222 exit only; to PA 724
Pennsylvania	Berks	Wyomissing	40.945– 41.250	65.895– 66.385		State Hill Road	
Pennsylvania	Berks	Wyomissing	41.538– 41.674	66.849– 67.068		Crossing Drive / Paper Mill Road (EB) Paper Mill Road (WB)	
Pennsylvania	Berks	Wyomissing	41.793– 42.480	67.259– 68.365		US 222 north – Allentown PA 12 east – Pricetown	East end of US 222 concurrency; western terminus of PA 12; to Reading Regional Airport and FirstEnergy Stadium
Pennsylvania	Berks	Wyomissing	42.791– 42.963	68.865– 69.142		North Wyomissing Boulevard	
Pennsylvania	Berks	West Reading	43.666– 43.909	70.274– 70.665		US 422 Bus. (Penn Avenue/Penn Street) – West Reading, Reading	
Pennsylvania	Berks	Reading	44.516– 44.816	71.642– 72.124		US 222 Bus. (Lancaster Avenue)	Left exit; to PA 10 and Alvernia University
Pennsylvania	Berks	Cumru Township	46.844– 47.233	75.388– 76.014		I-176 south – Morgantown	Northern terminus of I-176
Pennsylvania	Berks	Exeter Township	48.260	77.667		Mount Penn	Eastbound exit and westbound entrance; access via Neversink Road
Pennsylvania	Berks	Exeter Township	49.009	78.872		US 422 Bus. west – Mount Penn	Westbound exit and eastbound entrance; eastern terminus of US 422 Business
Pennsylvania	Berks	Exeter Township	49.009	78.872	East end of freeway		
Pennsylvania	Berks	Exeter Township	52.670	84.764		PA 345 south (South Center Road) – Birdsboro, Coatesville	Northern terminus of PA 345
Pennsylvania	Berks	Amity Township	57.075– 57.215	91.853– 92.079		PA 662 north (Old Swede Road) – Amityville, Fleetwood	Southern terminus of PA 662
Pennsylvania	Berks	Amity Township	57.505	92.545	West end of freeway		
Pennsylvania	Berks	Amity Township	57.505	92.545		Benjamin Franklin Highway east – Stowe, Pottstown Business District	Eastbound exit and westbound entrance; former US 422
Pennsylvania	Montgomery	West Pottsgrove Township	59.355– 59.813	95.523– 96.260		Stowe	Access via Grosstown Road
Pennsylvania	Chester	North Coventry Township	61.319– 61.579	98.683– 99.102		PA 100 – West Chester, Allentown	
Pennsylvania	Chester	North Coventry Township	61.765– 61.963	99.401– 99.720		Hanover Street	Westbound exit and eastbound entrance; access to Montgomery County Community College Pottstown Campus and Pottstown Business District
Pennsylvania	Chester	North Coventry Township	62.630	100.793		Keim Street	Eastbound exit and westbound entrance
Pennsylvania	Chester	North Coventry Township	63.022– 63.281	101.424– 101.841		PA 724 – Phoenixville	
Pennsylvania	Montgomery	Lower Pottsgrove Township	63.591– 63.915	102.340– 102.861		Armand Hammer Boulevard	
Pennsylvania	Montgomery	Lower Pottsgrove–Limerick township line	66.096– 66.455	106.371– 106.949		Sanatoga	Access via Evergreen Road
Pennsylvania	Montgomery	Limerick Township	68.412– 68.841	110.098– 110.789		Limerick, Linfield	Access via Lewis Road
Pennsylvania	Montgomery	Limerick Township	70.355– 70.707	113.225– 113.792		Trappe, Royersford	Access via Township Line Road
Pennsylvania	Montgomery	Upper Providence Township	73.707– 74.200	118.620– 119.413		PA 29 – Phoenixville, Collegeville	Access to Ursinus College
Pennsylvania	Montgomery	Upper Providence Township	76.431– 76.981	123.004– 123.889		Oaks, Audubon	Access via Egypt Road; access to Norristown
Pennsylvania	Montgomery	Lower Providence–West Norriton township line	79.888– 80.201	128.567– 129.071		PA 363 north – Audubon, Trooper	Southern terminus of PA 363
Pennsylvania	Montgomery	Upper Merion Township	80.734– 81.074	129.929– 130.476		PA 23 – Bridgeport, Valley Forge	Access to Valley Forge National Historical Park and Valley Forge Casino Resort
Pennsylvania	Chester	Tredyffrin Township	81.392– 81.488	130.988– 131.142		First Avenue	Eastbound exit and entrance
Pennsylvania	Chester	Tredyffrin Township	82.405– 82.560	132.618– 132.867		US 202 south / Swedesford Road – West Chester	Eastbound exit and westbound entrance
Pennsylvania	Chester	Tredyffrin Township	82.405– 82.560	132.618– 132.867		I-76 east – Philadelphia	Eastern terminus of US 422 eastern section; exit 328A on I-76
Pennsylvania	Chester	Tredyffrin Township	82.405– 82.560	132.618– 132.867		US 202 north to I-76 west / I-276 Toll east / Penna Turnpike – King of Prussia	Eastern terminus of US 422 eastern section; exit 328A on I-76
1.000 mi = 1.609 km; 1.000 km = 0.621 mi: Concurrency terminus; Electronic toll collection; Incomplete access

== Related routes ==
- U.S. Route 22
- U.S. Route 222
- U.S. Route 322
- U.S. Route 522
- Special routes of U.S. Route 422

== See also ==
- Chocolate Avenue
