= Sanatoga, Pennsylvania =

Unincorporated community in Pennsylvania, US

Sanatoga
- Census-designated place
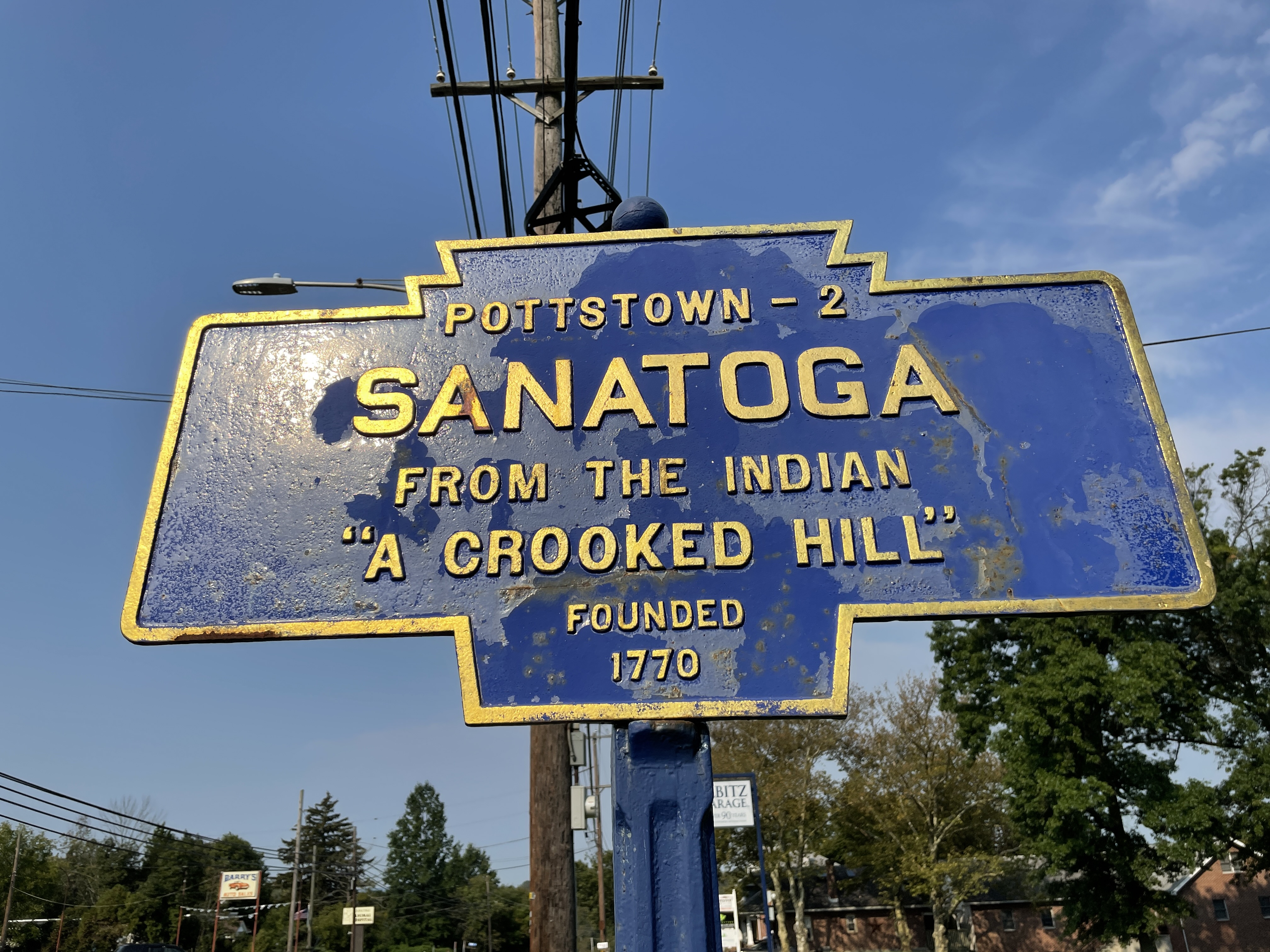
- Keystone Marker for Sanatoga

- Location of Sanatoga in Pennsylvania
- Coordinates: 40°15′01″N 75°35′20″W
- Country: United States
- State: Pennsylvania
- County: Montgomery
- Township: Lower Pottsgrove

Area
  - Total: 3.4 sq mi (8.8 km^{2})
  - Land: 3.4 sq mi (8.8 km^{2})
  - Water: 0.0 sq mi (0 km^{2})
- Elevation: 236 ft (72 m)

Population (2010)
  - Total: 8,378
  - Density: 2,500/sq mi (950/km^{2})
- Time zone: UTC-5 (EST)
  - Summer (DST): UTC-4 (EDT)
- Area code: 610

Sanatoga is a community and census-designated place (CDP) that is located in Lower Pottsgrove Township, Montgomery County, Pennsylvania, United States. It is situated immediately east of the borough of Pottstown on U.S. Route 422.

The population was 8,378 at the time of the 2010 census.

== Geography ==
Sanatoga is located at 40°15′1″N 75°35′20″W (40.250252, -75.588933).

According to the United States Census Bureau, the CDP has a total area of 3.4 square miles (8.8 km^{2}), of which 0.29% is water.

Sanatoga is adjacent to U.S. Route 422.

=== Climate ===
Climate data for Sanatoga, Pennsylvania (Heritage Field Airport) 1991–2020 normals, extremes 1999–present
Month	Jan	Feb	Mar	Apr	May	Jun	Jul	Aug	Sep	Oct	Nov	Dec	Year
Record high °F (°C)	71 (22)	78 (26)	82 (28)	92 (33)	94 (34)	98 (37)	105 (41)	101 (38)	98 (37)	91 (33)	80 (27)	73 (23)	105 (41)
Mean daily maximum °F (°C)	37.4 (3.0)	40.4 (4.7)	49.1 (9.5)	61.3 (16.3)	71.0 (21.7)	79.3 (26.3)	83.8 (28.8)	81.5 (27.5)	74.6 (23.7)	63.3 (17.4)	52.4 (11.3)	42.1 (5.6)	61.4 (16.3)
Daily mean °F (°C)	29.7 (−1.3)	31.9 (−0.1)	39.8 (4.3)	50.7 (10.4)	60.4 (15.8)	69.1 (20.6)	74.0 (23.3)	71.9 (22.2)	64.7 (18.2)	53.3 (11.8)	43.0 (6.1)	34.4 (1.3)	51.9 (11.1)
Mean daily minimum °F (°C)	22.0 (−5.6)	23.4 (−4.8)	30.4 (−0.9)	40.0 (4.4)	49.9 (9.9)	58.9 (14.9)	64.2 (17.9)	62.2 (16.8)	54.8 (12.7)	43.3 (6.3)	33.7 (0.9)	26.7 (−2.9)	42.5 (5.8)
Record low °F (°C)	−7 (−22)	−2 (−19)	0 (−18)	21 (−6)	30 (−1)	40 (4)	48 (9)	47 (8)	34 (1)	25 (−4)	11 (−12)	0 (−18)	−7 (−22)
Average precipitation inches (mm)	3.02 (77)	2.56 (65)	4.07 (103)	3.64 (92)	3.69 (94)	3.84 (98)	4.72 (120)	4.38 (111)	4.83 (123)	3.81 (97)	3.02 (77)	3.76 (96)	45.34 (1,152)
Average precipitation days (≥ 0.01 in)	10.4	10.4	11.1	12.5	12.7	12.6	11.6	12.3	11.8	11.6	9.2	11.2	137.4
Source: NOAA

== Demographics ==
Historical population
Census	Pop.	Note	%±
1990	5,534		—
2000	7,734		39.8%
2010	8,378		8.3%
2020	8,496		1.4%

At the 2000 census there were 7,734 people, 2,734 households, and 2,058 families living in the CDP. The population density was 2,265.7 inhabitants per square mile (874.8/km^{2}). There were 2,811 housing units at an average density of 823.5 per square mile (318.0/km^{2}). The racial makeup of the CDP was 85.60% White, 11.46% African American, 0.14% Native American, 0.92% Asian, 0.04% Pacific Islander, 0.32% from other races, and 1.53% from two or more races. Hispanic or Latino of any race were 1.51%.

There were 2,734 households, 42.8% had children under the age of 18 living with them, 57.9% were married couples living together, 13.8% had a female householder with no husband present, and 24.7% were non-families. 20.2% of households were made up of individuals, and 8.2% were one person aged 65 or older. The average household size was 2.76 and the average family size was 3.20.

The age distribution was 30.8% under the age of 18, 6.4% from 18 to 24, 32.9% from 25 to 44, 18.9% from 45 to 64, and 11.0% 65 or older. The median age was 34 years. For every 100 females, there were 90.9 males. For every 100 females age 18 and over, there were 84.3 males.

The median household income was $48,765 and the median family income was $55,559. Males had a median income of $44,605 versus $31,727 for females. The per capita income for the CDP was $20,816. About 9.8% of families and 10.4% of the population were below the poverty line, including 16.5% of those under age 18 and 8.9% of those age 65 or over.

== Education ==
It is in the Pottsgrove School District.
