= Vinco, Pennsylvania =

Unincorporated community in Pennsylvania, US

- Census-designated place
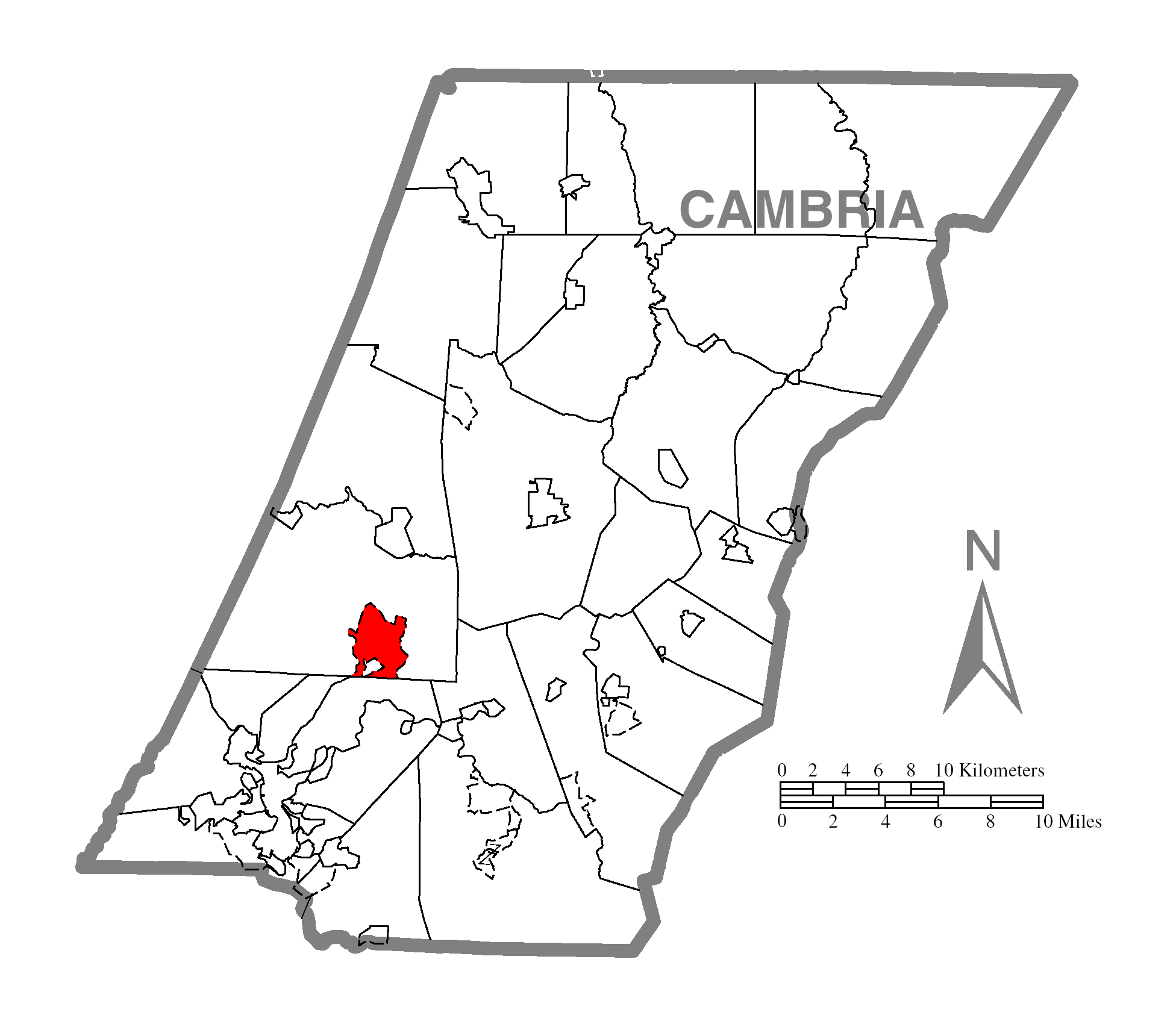
- Location within Cambria County

- Location within the U.S. state of Pennsylvania Vinco (the United States)
- Coordinates: 40°24′33″N 78°51′1″W
- Country: United States
- State: Pennsylvania
- County: Cambria
- Township: Jackson

Area
  - Total: 3.9 sq mi (10.1 km^{2})
  - Land: 3.9 sq mi (10.1 km^{2})
  - Water: 0 sq mi (0.0 km^{2})
- Elevation: 1,736 ft (529 m)

Population (2010)
  - Total: 1,305
  - Density: 334/sq mi (128.9/km^{2})
- Time zone: UTC-5 (Eastern (EST))
  - Summer (DST): UTC-4 (EDT)
- FIPS code: 42-80264
- GNIS feature ID: 1190430

Vinco is an unincorporated community and census-designated place (CDP) in Jackson Township, Cambria County, in the U.S. state of Pennsylvania. The population was 1,305 at the 2010 census.

== Geography ==
Vinco is located in western Cambria County at 40°24′33″N 78°51′1″W (40.409239, -78.850192). It is in the southeastern part of Jackson Township and is bordered by the CDP of Mundys Corner to the north. Pennsylvania Route 271 passes through Vinco, leading north 5 miles (8 km) to Nanty Glo and southwest 7 miles (11 km) to the center of Johnstown.

According to the United States Census Bureau, the Vinco CDP has a total area of 3.9 square miles (10.1 km^{2}), all land.

== Demographics ==
As of the census of 2000, there were 1,429 people, 593 households, and 442 families living in the CDP. The population density was 357.4 inhabitants per square mile (138.0/km^{2}). There were 611 housing units at an average density of 152.8 per square mile (59.0/km^{2}). The racial makeup of the CDP was 99.51% White, 0.07% Native American, and 0.42% from two or more races. Hispanic or Latino of any race were 0.07% of the population.

There were 593 households, out of which 26.3% had children under the age of 18 living with them, 64.6% were married couples living together, 7.1% had a female householder with no husband present, and 25.3% were non-families. 22.8% of all households were made up of individuals, and 13.5% had someone living alone who was 65 years of age or older. The average household size was 2.40 and the average family size was 2.81.

In the CDP, the population was spread out, with 19.2% under the age of 18, 7.0% from 18 to 24, 23.6% from 25 to 44, 30.1% from 45 to 64, and 20.1% who were 65 years of age or older. The median age was 45 years. For every 100 females, there were 99.0 males. For every 100 females age 18 and over, there were 92.7 males.

The median income for a household in the CDP was $37,361, and the median income for a family was $45,486. Males had a median income of $39,808 versus $17,692 for females. The per capita income for the CDP was $18,488. About 5.5% of families and 4.9% of the population were below the poverty line, including 4.8% of those under age 18 and 5.2% of those age 65 or over.

== Education ==
It is in the Central Cambria School District.
