= Northern Cambria, Pennsylvania =

Borough in Pennsylvania, US

- Borough
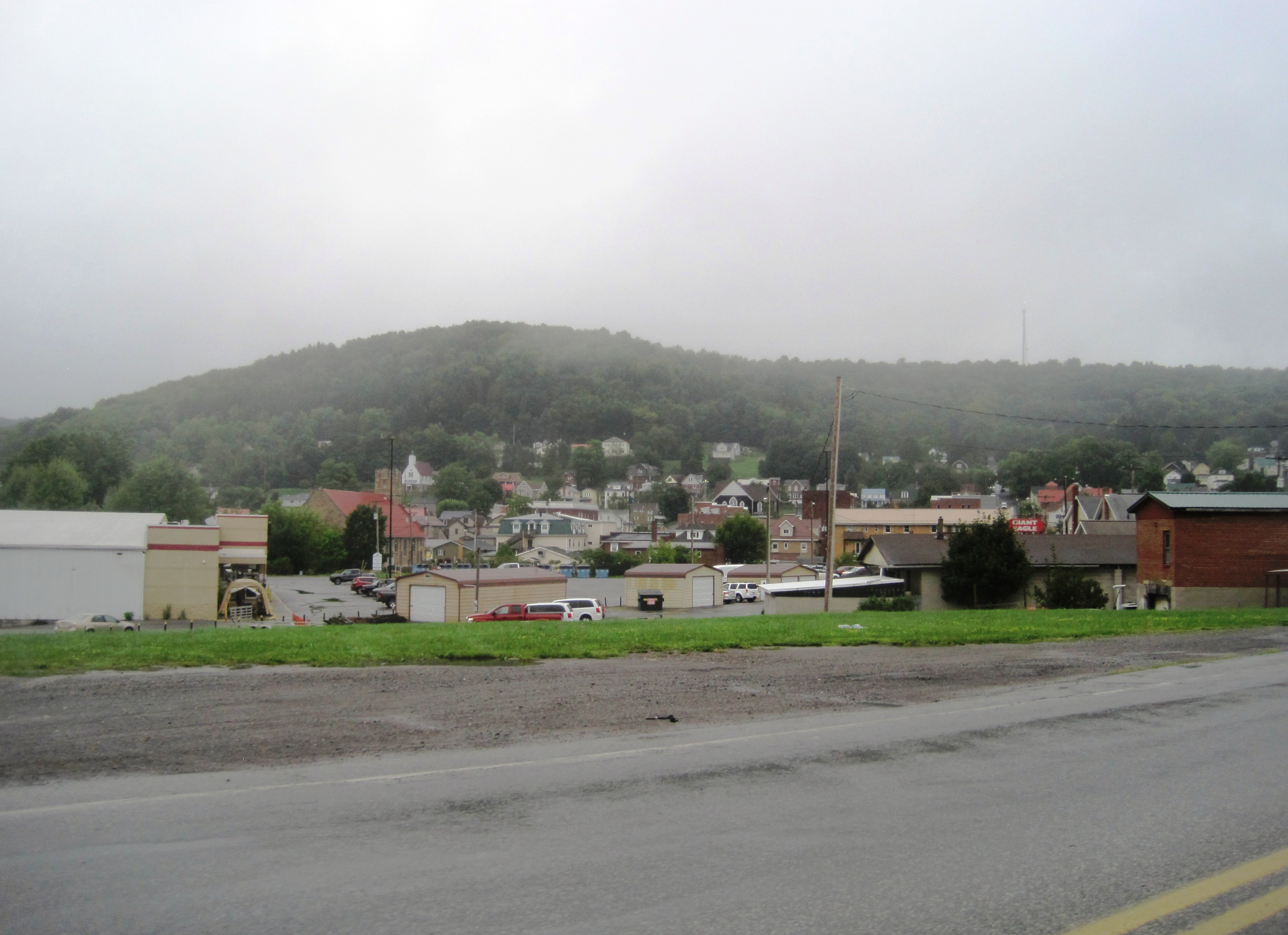
- Central district of Northern Cambria

- Location of Northern Cambria in Cambria County, Pennsylvania.

- Location within Pennsylvania
- Coordinates: 40°39′21″N 78°46′46″W
- Country: United States
- State: Pennsylvania
- County: Cambria
- Settled: 1893
- Incorporated: 2000

Government
  - Type: Borough council
  - Mayor: Lisa Mays

Area
  - Total: 3.09 sq mi (8.00 km^{2})
  - Land: 3.09 sq mi (8.00 km^{2})
  - Water: 0 sq mi (0.00 km^{2})
- Elevation: 1,601 ft (488 m)

Population (2020)
  - Total: 3,560
  - Density: 1,152.3/sq mi (444.89/km^{2})
- Time zone: UTC-5 (Eastern (EST))
  - Summer (DST): UTC-4 (EDT)
- ZIP code: 15714
- Area code: 814
- FIPS code: 42-55000
- GNIS feature ID: 2086609
- Website: www.northerncambriaborough.net

Northern Cambria is a borough in Cambria County, Pennsylvania, United States. It is part of the Johnstown, Pennsylvania Metropolitan Statistical Area. As of the 2020 census, Northern Cambria had a population of 3,560.

== History ==
The area was first settled by Europeans in the early-to-middle 19th century. The presence of the West Branch of the Susquehanna River allowed loggers to move their harvest downstream. Small farms developed, but the area changed in the 1890s when mining of the extensive bituminous coal fields in the area became the dominant industry. The mining companies required skilled workers, and many came from Great Britain and Eastern Europe. Railroads were built to transport the coal out, and the town flourished with the influx of money. In the 1980s, the coal industry began a decline, and there has been a subsequent decline in the population of the area. In November 1922, the Reilly Shaft No. 1 mine explosion occurred, killing 78 coal miners.

The borough of Northern Cambria was incorporated on January 1, 2000. It was formed from the merger of two smaller municipalities, Barnesboro and Spangler. The merger proposal was taken to residents in the 1997 election, passing in Spangler 410-243 and in Barnesboro 466-324.

A pumpkin weighing 1,469 pounds (666 kg) was grown by resident Larry Checkon in 2005 (a world record at that time).

== Geography ==
Northern Cambria is located near the northwest corner of Cambria County at 40°39′21″N 78°46′46″W (40.655813, -78.779472), in the valley of the West Branch of the Susquehanna River, near its headwaters. U.S. Route 219 passes through the borough, leading south 15 miles (24 km) to Ebensburg, the county seat, and north 47 miles (76 km) to DuBois.

According to the United States Census Bureau, Northern Cambria has a total area of 3.0 square miles (7.7 km^{2}), all land.

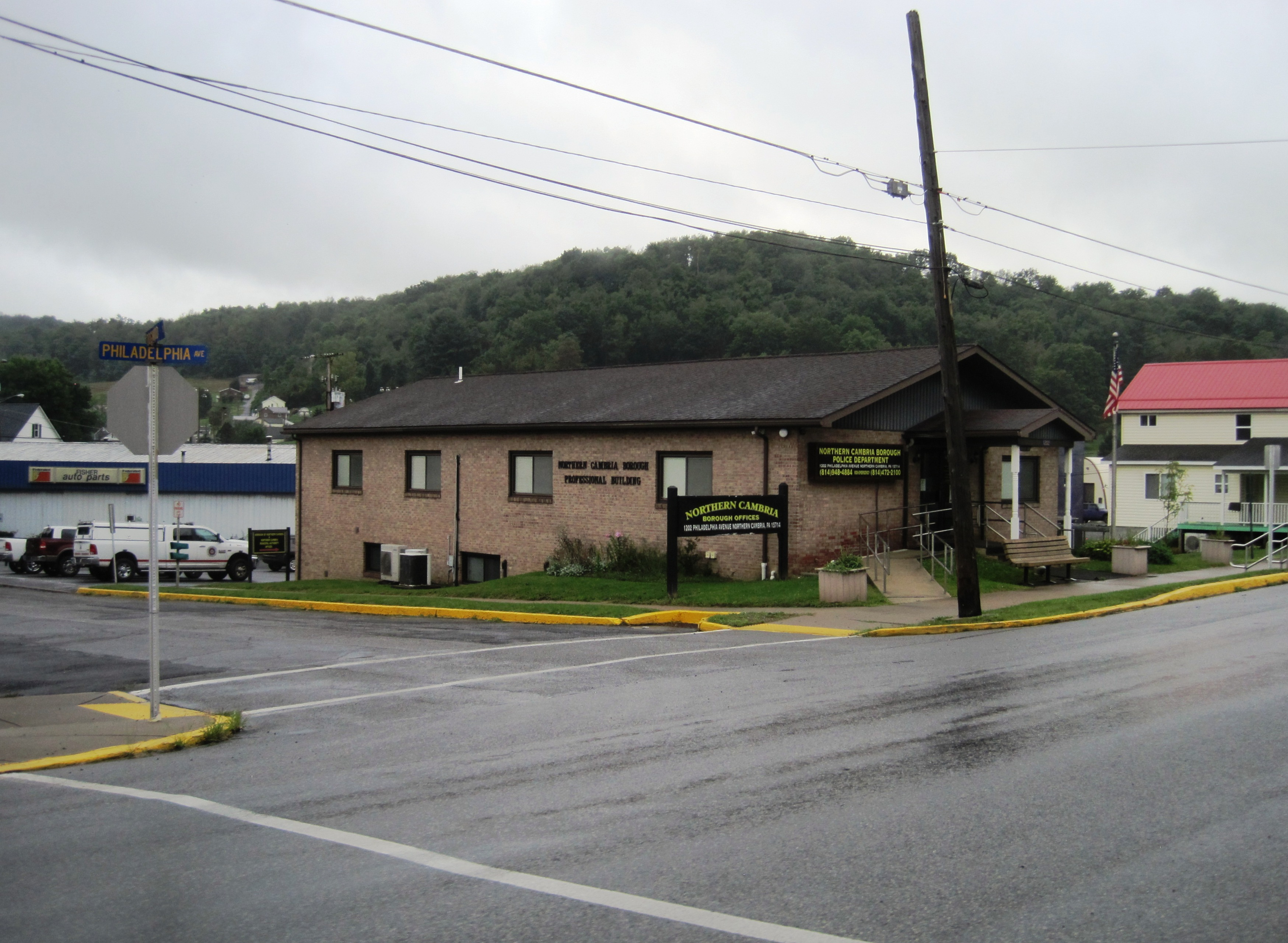
Northern Cambria Borough Hall

== Geology ==
The valley in which Northern Cambria lies is underlain by the coal-bearing Allegheny Group of Pennsylvanian age. The hills surrounding the borough are formed by the Glenshaw Formation. The axis of the Barnesboro Syncline trends northeast and passes through the center of the former Barnesboro.

== Education ==
The local public school district is the Northern Cambria School District. The district has one school building in operation, serving students from Pre-K to 12th grade. The previous high school ceased operation beginning in the 2025 academic school year. Surrounding public school districts include:

- Cambria Heights School District
- Central Cambria School District
- Blacklick Valley School District
- Penns Manor Area School District
- Purchase Line School District
- Harmony Area School District

Students in grades K-8 can also attend the private Northern Cambria Catholic School in Nicktown, 3 miles (5 km) to the south. Some students in grades 9-12 attend the private Bishop Carroll High School in Ebensburg.

Nearby colleges include Mount Aloysius College (Cresson), Saint Francis University (Loretto), Indiana University of Pennsylvania (Indiana), the University of Pittsburgh at Johnstown, Penn State Altoona, and Pennsylvania Highlands Community College (near Johnstown).

== Demographics ==
Historical population
Census	Pop.	Note	%±
2000	4,199		—
2010	3,835		−8.7%
2020	3,560		−7.2%

=== 2020 census ===
As of the 2020 census, Northern Cambria had a population of 3,560. The median age was 44.9 years. 20.1% of residents were under the age of 18 and 21.5% of residents were 65 years of age or older. For every 100 females there were 98.8 males, and for every 100 females age 18 and over there were 98.2 males age 18 and over.

0.0% of residents lived in urban areas, while 100.0% lived in rural areas.

There were 1,545 households in Northern Cambria, of which 24.8% had children under the age of 18 living in them. Of all households, 41.7% were married-couple households, 22.4% were households with a male householder and no spouse or partner present, and 28.7% were households with a female householder and no spouse or partner present. About 33.5% of all households were made up of individuals and 16.6% had someone living alone who was 65 years of age or older.

There were 1,760 housing units, of which 12.2% were vacant. The homeowner vacancy rate was 3.2% and the rental vacancy rate was 8.8%.

Racial composition as of the 2020 census
Race	Number	Percent
White	3,378	94.9%
Black or African American	21	0.6%
American Indian and Alaska Native	2	0.1%
Asian	12	0.3%
Native Hawaiian and Other Pacific Islander	3	0.1%
Some other race	2	0.1%
Two or more races	142	4.0%
Hispanic or Latino (of any race)	30	0.8%

=== Demographic estimates ===
As of 2019, there were 1,191 families residing in the borough. The population density was 1,401.9 inhabitants per square mile (541.3/km^{2}).

The average household size was 2.37 and the average family size was 2.92.

=== Income and poverty ===
The median income for a household in the borough was $24,655, and the median income for a family was $29,917. Males had a median income of $27,214 versus $17,546 for females. The per capita income for the borough was $13,129. About 15.4% of families and 17.7% of the population were below the poverty line, including 29.1% of those under age 18 and 7.4% of those age 65 or over.

== Notable people ==
- Frank Brazill, baseball player. Born in Spangler, now Northern Cambria.
- Chris Columbus, director of Home Alone, Mrs. Doubtfire, and the first two Harry Potter movies. Born in Spangler, now Northern Cambria.
- Duffy Daugherty, athletic fields named after and top historical football coach in Barnesboro, now Northern Cambria Hall of Fame noted.
- Jennifer Haigh, novelist. Born in Barnesboro, now Northern Cambria.
- Marcel Duriez, novelist, artist, and musician Born in Barnesboro, now Northern Cambria.
- George Magulick, player in the National Football League in 1944. Born in Spangler, now Northern Cambria.
- Joe Maross, actor. Born in Barnesboro, now Northern Cambria.
- Nicola Paone, singer and songwriter. Born in Barnesboro, now Northern Cambria.
- Cheryl Strayed, memoirist, novelist and essayist portrayed by Reese Witherspoon in the film Wild. Born in Spangler, now Northern Cambria.
- J. Irving Whalley, Republican member of the U.S. House of Representatives from Pennsylvania. Born in Barnesboro, now Northern Cambria.
- David Wilkerson, pastor. Born in Barnesboro, now Northern Cambria.

== Media ==
Three daily newspapers cover the Northern Cambria borough: the Altoona Mirror, the Johnstown Tribune-Democrat, and the Indiana Gazette. 950 WNCC was the town's radio station since 1950. The station went off the air in 2010. The local NBC affiliate is WJAC-6, the local CBS affiliate is WTAJ-10, the local ABC affiliate is WATM-23, the local PBS station is WPSU-3, and the local Fox affiliate is WWCP-8. Comcast is the cable provider for the borough.
