= Pennsylvania Route 271 =

State highway in Pennsylvania, US

Pennsylvania Route 271

Route information
- Maintained by PennDOT and City of Johnstown
- Length: 46.809 mi (75.332 km)
- Existed: May 27, 1935–present

Major junctions
- South end: PA 711 in Oak Grove
- US 22 in Mundys Corner; US 422 in Belsano
- North end: US 219 in Northern Cambria

Location
- Country: United States
- State: Pennsylvania
- Counties: Westmoreland, Somerset, Cambria

Highway system
- Pennsylvania State Route System; Interstate; US; State; Scenic; Legislative
← PA 270	→ PA 272
← PA 259	→ PA 261
← PA 932	→ PA 934

Pennsylvania Route 271 (PA 271) is a north–south state route located in Western Pennsylvania. Its southern terminus is at PA 711 in Oak Grove in Ligonier Township, and its northern terminus is at U.S. Route 219 (US 219) in Northern Cambria. The route was designated on May 27, 1935, in coordination with the release of a new state road map.

The easy grade section of the highway in Johnstown is notorious for the many rockslides that occur on the hillside above the road. PennDOT conducted explosive blasting on the hillside in January 2008 in an effort to bring down rocks and permanently correct the rockslide problem.

== Route description ==
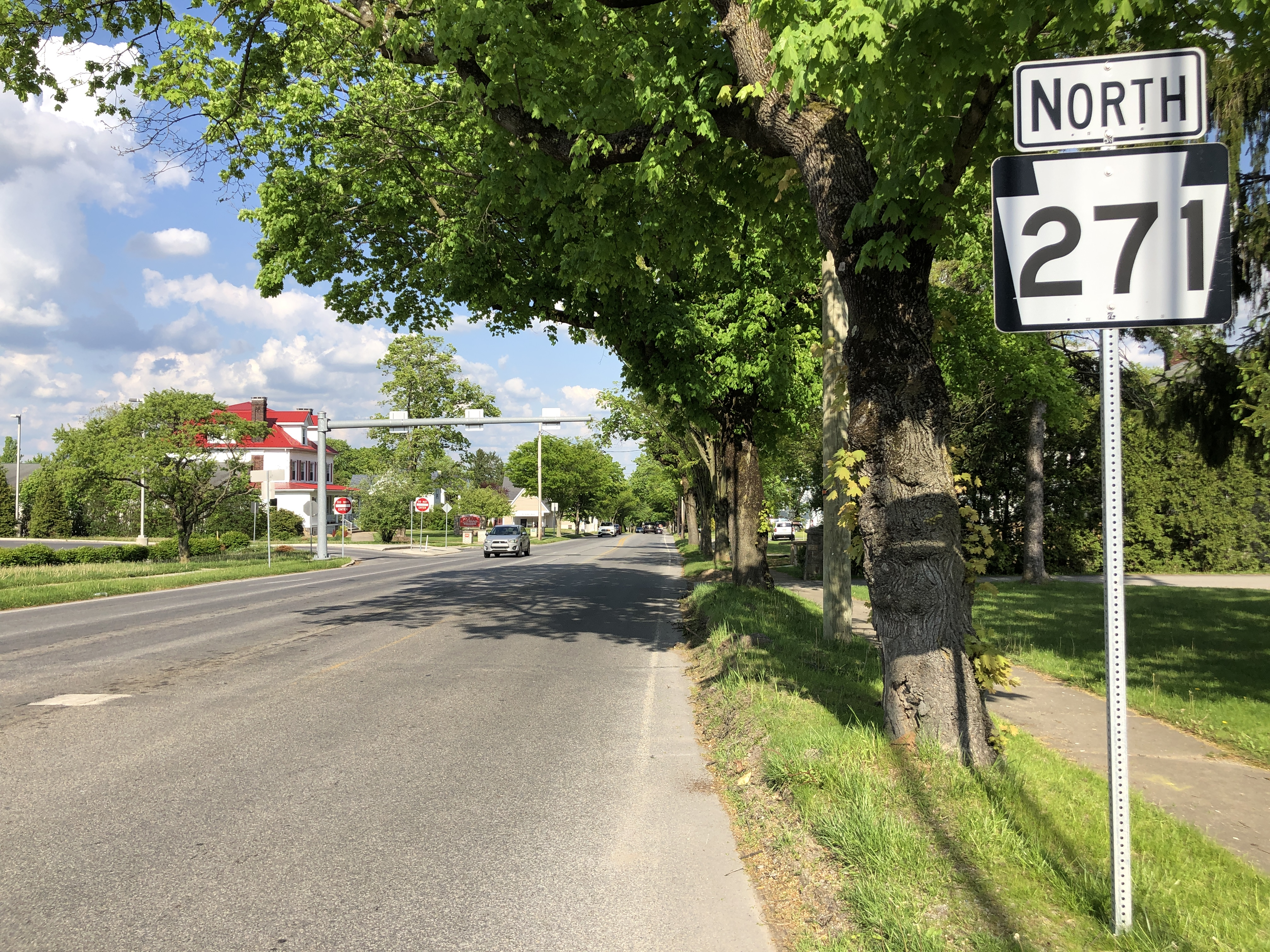
PA 271 northbound in Westmont

PA 271 begins at an intersection with PA 711 in Ligonier Township, Westmoreland County, heading east on two-lane undivided Menoher Highway. The road heads through wooded areas with some small fields and rural homes. The route continues east-northeast, entering Fairfield Township as it heads into forested areas and crosses Laurel Hill. The road heads east and passes along the northern border of Laurel Ridge State Park. PA 271 enters Conemaugh Township in Somerset County and heads northeast for 0.9 miles (1.4 km) through more forested areas near the state park.

The route crosses into Upper Yoder Township in Cambria County and becomes Menoher Boulevard, leaving Laurel Ridge State Park and heading through more forests. The road turns northeast and winds through more wooded areas with some fields and homes. PA 271 heads into the borough of Westmont and turns east into residential areas. The route crosses into the borough of Southmont and turns southeast running between developed areas to the southwest and Grandview Cemetery to the northeast as a three-lane road with one northbound lane and two southbound lanes. The road curves northeast into wooded areas and crosses into the city of Johnstown, heading north-northwest past more homes as a two-lane road. PA 271 turns east-northeast onto the city-maintained Haynes Street and passes under the PA 56 freeway, crossing PA 403 and heading into commercial areas. The route crosses Stonycreek River and turns north onto Bedford Street, which heads south to provide access to and from eastbound PA 56. State maintenance of the route resumes and PA 271 heads north into downtown Johnstown. It later turns northeast onto Clinton Street. The road crosses CSX's S&C Subdivision railroad line and heads between industrial areas to the northwest and residential areas to the southeast, crossing a Lehigh Valley Rail Management railroad line twice. The route turns north onto Phoebe Court and crosses another Lehigh Valley Rail Management line and the Little Conemaugh River before turning northeast onto Maple Avenue. PA 271 heads through residential and industrial areas, heading over another railroad line and the Little Conemaugh River into the borough of Franklin.

Here, the road becomes Locust Street and heads between the river to the northwest and industrial areas to the southeast, turning southeast to pass over a Lehigh Valley Rail Management line. The route turns northeast onto Main Street and runs through the downtown area before turning northwest onto Franklin Street and coming to a bridge over the railroad line and the Little Conemaugh River. At this point, PA 271 enters the borough of East Conemaugh and becomes Main Street, crossing over Norfolk Southern's Pittsburgh Line before running through the commercial downtown. The route heads into residential areas and turns northeast onto 2nd Street, passing more homes. PA 271 turns north-northeast onto Parkhill Drive, heading into wooded areas and crossing into East Taylor Township.

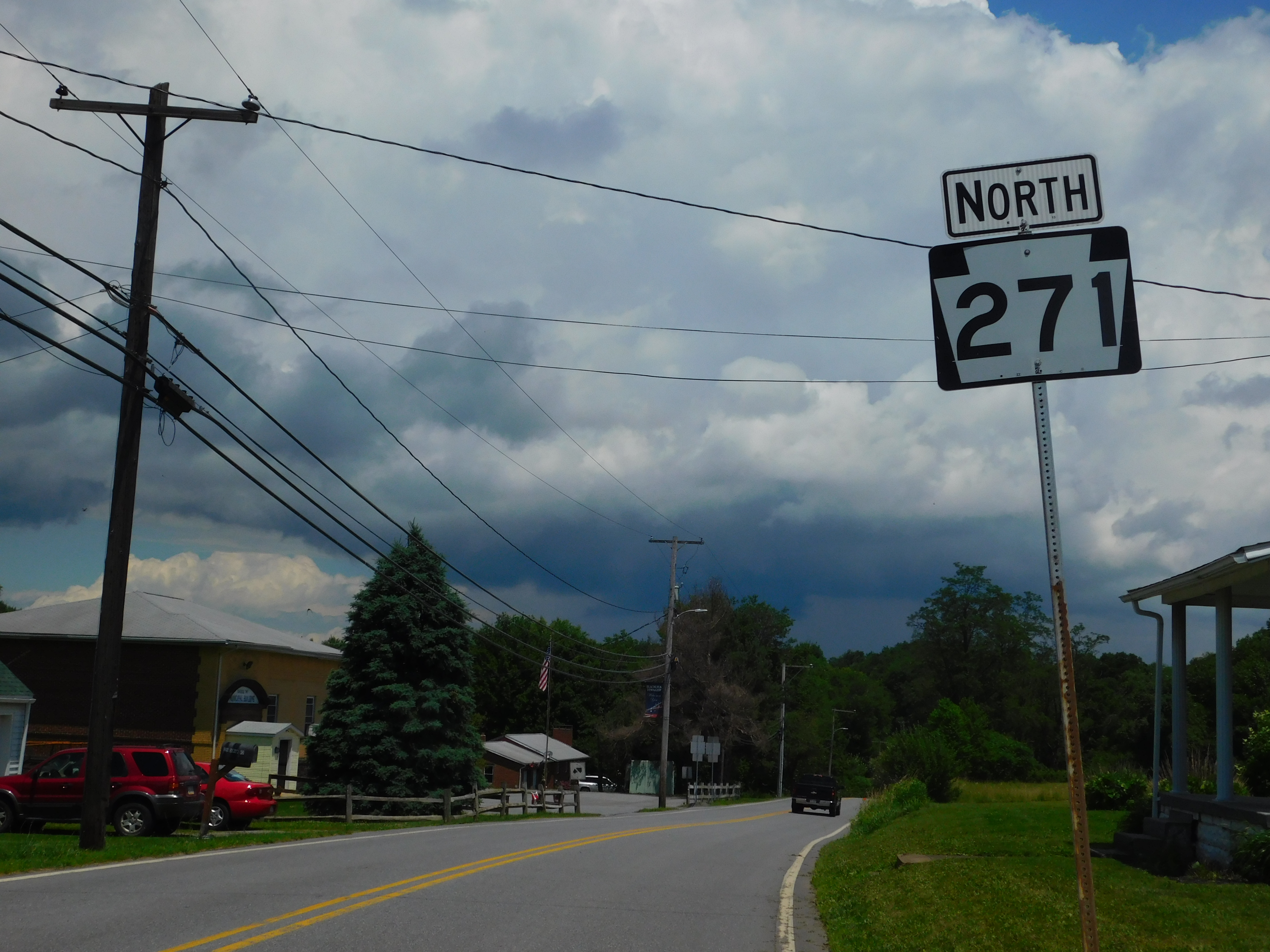
PA 271 north in Belsano

The road curves northeast and north as it continues through woodland with some residences, passing through Parkhill. The route turns northeast onto William Penn Avenue and heads through wooded areas with some fields and homes, running through Wesley Chapel. PA 271 crosses into Jackson Township and heads north through more rural areas with residences, passing through Vinco and Fairview. Farther north, the road turns to the northeast and passes through Mundys Corner before coming to a partial cloverleaf interchange with US 22, at which point it is briefly a four-lane divided highway. The route becomes a two-lane undivided road again and heads north through more wooded areas with some homes before crossing into the borough of Nanty Glo and becoming Shoemaker Street, gaining a center left-turn lane and passing a few businesses. PA 271 becomes two-lane Book Street and passes more homes and commercial establishments, turning northeast and crossing South Branch Blacklick Creek. The route passes businesses and turns northwest onto 2nd Street, passing through residential areas. The road heads into Blacklick Township and becomes Station Road, heading through forested areas with some homes. PA 271 curves north and runs through Twin Rocks and Seldersville before coming to an intersection with US 422.

At this point, the route turns west to form a concurrency with US 422 on Benjamin Franklin Highway, passing through rural areas of homes before turning northeast onto Duman Road at Belsano. PA 271 heads north through wooded areas with some fields and residences. The road curves northeast and enters Barr Township, continuing through more farmland and woodland with occasional homes. The route turns east and northeast to remain on Duman Road before turning north onto Blue Goose Road, heading north-northeast through open agricultural areas with some trees and residences. PA 271 heads into the residential community of Nicktown, where it comes to an intersection with PA 553. The route turns east to form a concurrency with PA 553 on Ridge Road, passing through more of the community. The road heads into agricultural areas where PA 271 turns to the north onto Nicktown Hill Road, heading through more farms and woods with some homes. The route curves northeast and north, crossing into the borough of Northern Cambria and becoming 24th Street. Here, PA 271 curves northeast and crosses the West Branch Susquehanna River before it passes a few businesses and ends at US 219.

== Major intersections ==
County	Location	mi	km	Destinations	Notes
Westmoreland	Ligonier Township	0.000	0.000	PA 711 (Ligonier Street) – Ligonier, New Florence	Southern terminus
Somerset	No major junctions				
Cambria	Johnstown	18.129	29.176	PA 403 (Napoleon Street) to PA 56 west	
Cambria	Johnstown	18.359	29.546	To PA 56 east	Access via SR 3016
Cambria	Jackson Township	29.234– 29.456	47.048– 47.405	US 22 (Admiral Peary Highway) – Ebensburg, Blairsville	Interchange
Cambria	Blacklick Township	35.016	56.353	US 422 east (Benjamin Franklin Highway) – Ebensburg	South end of US 422 overlap
Cambria	Blacklick Township	35.428	57.016	US 422 west (Benjamin Franklin Highway) – Indiana	North end of US 422 overlap
Cambria	Barr Township	43.417	69.873	PA 553 west (Alverda Road)	South end of PA 553 overlap
Cambria	Barr Township	43.996– 44.088	70.805– 70.953	PA 553 east (Ridge Road)	North end of PA 553 overlap
Cambria	Northern Cambria	46.809	75.332	US 219 (Bigler Avenue) – DuBois, Carrolltown	Northern terminus
1.000 mi = 1.609 km; 1.000 km = 0.621 mi: Concurrency terminus
