= Northern Cambria High School =

School in Pennsylvania, US

Northern Cambria School District
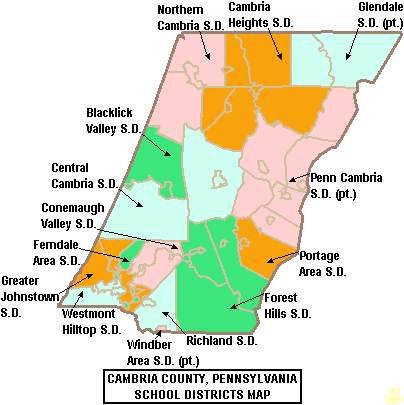

Location
- 601 Joseph Street; Northern Cambria,, Cambria County, Pennsylvania 15714; United States of America; 40.6557°N 78.7795°W

Information
- Type: Public
- Principal: Lisa Prebish
- Faculty: 27 teachers
- Grades: 9th - 12th
- Enrollment: 328 (2016–17)
- Language: English
- Colors: gold and black
- Website: http://www.ncsd.k12.pa.us

Northern Cambria High School is located at 813 35th Street, Northern Cambria. It is a small, rural public school in Cambria County, Pennsylvania, United States of America. It is the sole high school operated by the Northern Cambria School District. In the 2021–2022 school year, enrollment was 335 pupils in 9th through 12th grades. The current high school building is the John F. Kennedy building, which opened in 1963 when the students from the former Barnesboro and Spangler High Schools were first housed at the same location.

High school students may choose to attend Admiral Peary Area Vocational Technical School for training in the construction and mechanical trades. The Appalachia Intermediate Unit IU8 provides the district with a wide variety of services like specialized education for disabled students and hearing, background checks for employees, state mandated recognizing and reporting child abuse training, speech and visual disability services and professional development for staff and faculty.

== Extracurriculars ==
The district offers a wide variety of clubs, activities and an extensive, publicly funded sports program.

=== Athletics ===
The Northern Cambria teams are call the Colts with the school colors being black and gold. The black color was adopted from the previous Barnesboro High School and the gold from Spangler High School. The Northern Cambria Track and Sports Complex (Charles Miller Track) is located behind the high school. The school football field is not at the high school, but at a site about one mile away. The school's girls volleyball team won the Pennsylvania Interscholastic Athletic Association (PIAA) A state championship in 2005, 2009, 2018 & 2019. The boys basketball team won the PIAA Class B state championship in 1965.

Northern Cambria High School offers the following PIAA sports:

Varsity

Boys

- Baseball - A
- Basketball- AA
- Cross country - A
- Football - A
- Golf - AA
- Rifle - AAAA
- Swimming and diving - AA
- Track and field - AA
- Volleyball - AA
- Wrestling - AA

Girls

- Basketball - AA
- Cheer - AAAA
- Cross country - A
- Golf
- Rifle - AAAA
- Softball - AAA
- Swimming and diving - AA
- Track and field - AA
- Volleyball - A

According to PIAA directory July 2015 Northern Cambria's athletic teams compete in the Heritage Conference. Most of the schools in this conference are in Indiana County.

In 2014, Northern Cambria School District discontinued offering its own wrestling team due to a lack of participation. Students can access a wrestling program through a cooperative program with neighboring Cambria Heights School District.
