= East Taylor Township, Cambria County, Pennsylvania =

Township in Pennsylvania, US

Coordinates: 40°21′00″N 78°49′59″W

East Taylor Township, Pennsylvania
- Township
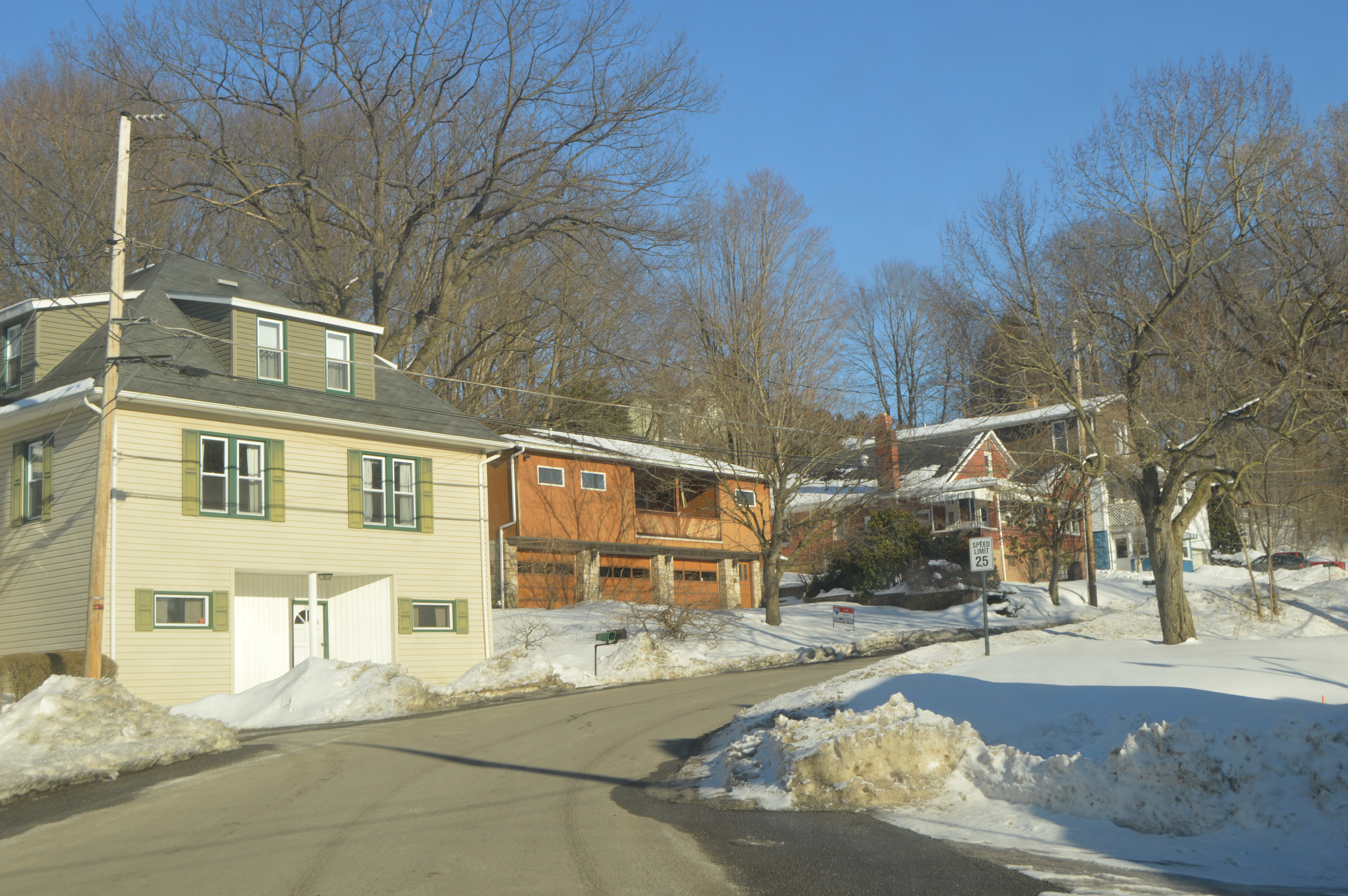
- Mele Street in Parkhill

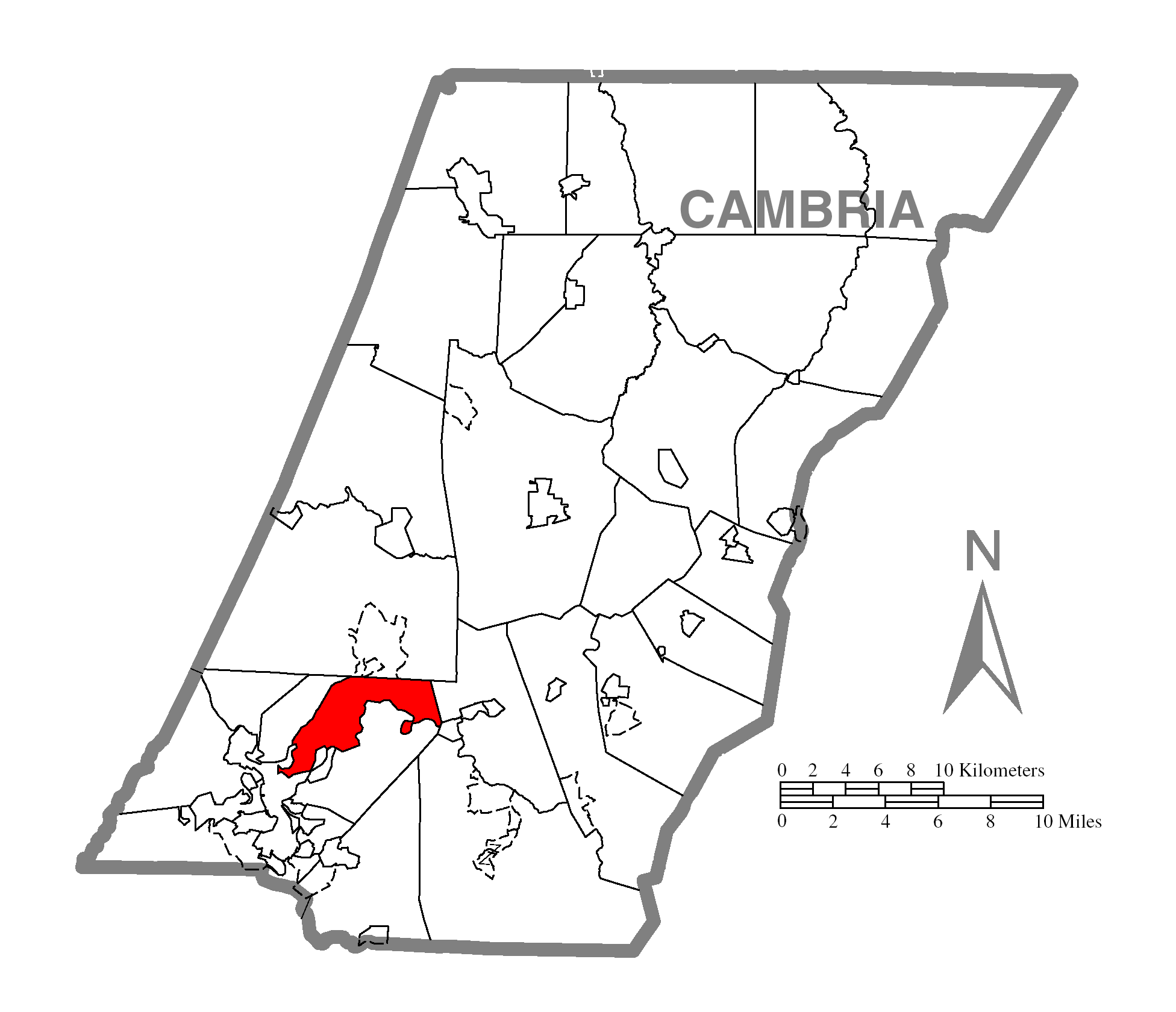
- Map of Cambria County, Pennsylvania highlighting East Taylor Township

- Map of Cambria County, Pennsylvania
- Country: United States
- State: Pennsylvania
- County: Cambria
- Incorporated: 1884

Area
  - Total: 9.12 sq mi (23.62 km^{2})
  - Land: 8.81 sq mi (22.82 km^{2})
  - Water: 0.31 sq mi (0.80 km^{2})

Population (2010)
  - Total: 2,726
  - Estimate (2016): 2,571
  - Density: 291.8/sq mi (112.68/km^{2})
- Time zone: UTC-5 (Eastern (EST))
  - Summer (DST): UTC-4 (EDT)
- Area code: 814
- FIPS code: 42-021-21896
- Website: www.easttaylortwp.com

East Taylor Township is a township in Cambria County, Pennsylvania, United States. The population was 2,726 at the 2010 census, unchanged since the 2000 census. It is part of the Johnstown, Pennsylvania Metropolitan Statistical Area.

== Geography ==
The township is located in southwestern Cambria County, bordered to the southwest by the city of Johnstown and to the south partly by the borough of East Conemaugh. The Little Conemaugh River forms most of the southern border of the township. Pennsylvania Route 271 passes through the township, leading south through East Conemaugh into Johnstown and north 8 miles (13 km) to Nanty-Glo. Ebensburg, the Cambria County seat, is 13 miles (21 km) to the northeast.

According to the United States Census Bureau, East Taylor Township has a total area of 9.1 square miles (23.6 km^{2}), of which 8.8 square miles (22.8 km^{2}) is land and 0.31 square miles (0.8 km^{2}), or 3.39%, is water.

== Communities ==
=== Unincorporated communities ===
- Eastmont
- Echo
- Goods Corner
- Mineral Point
- Parkhill
- Wesley Chapel
- West Point

== Demographics ==
Historical population
Census	Pop.	Note	%±
2000	2,726		—
2010	2,726		0.0%
2016 (est.)	2,571		−5.7%
U.S. Decennial Census

As of the census of 2000, there were 2,726 people, 1,083 households, and 813 families residing in the township. The population density was 304.1 inhabitants per square mile (117.4/km^{2}). There were 1,128 housing units at an average density of 125.9 per square mile (48.6/km^{2}). The racial makeup of the township was 97.25% White, 2.24% African American, 0.04% Native American, 0.04% Asian, 0.11% from other races, and 0.33% from two or more races. Hispanic or Latino of any race were 0.51% of the population.

There were 1,083 households, out of which 25.9% had children under the age of 18 living with them, 59.8% were married couples living together, 11.1% had a female householder with no husband present, and 24.9% were non-families. 22.0% of all households were made up of individuals, and 13.5% had someone living alone who was 65 years of age or older. The average household size was 2.52 and the average family size was 2.91.

In the township the population was spread out, with 20.5% under the age of 18, 5.6% from 18 to 24, 27.6% from 25 to 44, 26.0% from 45 to 64, and 20.2% who were 65 years of age or older. The median age was 43 years. For every 100 females there were 93.3 males. For every 100 females age 18 and over, there were 91.8 males.

The median income for a household in the township was $35,453, and the median income for a family was $39,012. Males had a median income of $31,712 versus $21,025 for females. The per capita income for the township was $16,393. About 7.1% of families and 7.5% of the population were below the poverty line, including 11.2% of those under age 18 and 10.0% of those age 65 or over.
