= Spangler, Pennsylvania =

Spangler
- Unincorporated area
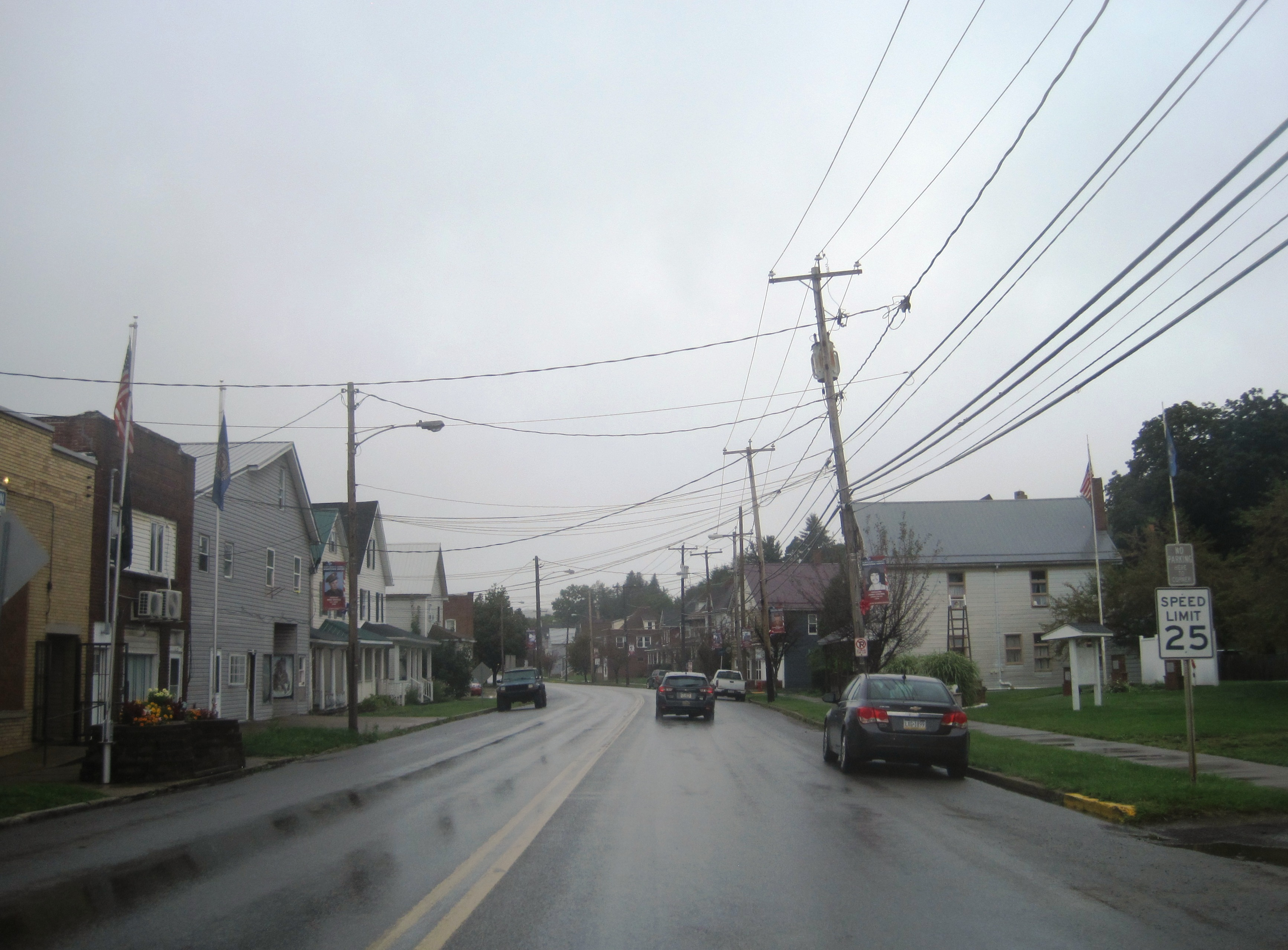
- US 219 northbound through what was once Spangler

- Location within the U.S. state of Pennsylvania
- Coordinates: 40°39′21″N 78°46′46″W
- Country: United States
- State: Pennsylvania
- County: Cambria
- Time zone: UTC-5 (Eastern (EST))
  - Summer (DST): UTC-4 (EDT)

Spangler, Pennsylvania was a borough that was located in the northwest corner of Cambria County, Pennsylvania, United States. It is now part of Northern Cambria.

== History ==
This area was first settled by Europeans during the early to mid-nineteenth century. The West Branch of the Susquehanna River enabled loggers to move their lumber harvests down river.

Small farms subsequently developed and the town then came into existence in 1893 when mining of extensive bituminous coal fields in the area became the dominant industry. These companies required skilled workers, many of whom came from Great Britain and Eastern Europe.

Railroad lines were then built to transport the coal and the town continued to expand due to the increased economic activity.

=== 1922 mining disaster ===
A mining disaster occurred on November 6, 1922, at Reilly No. 1 Mine. Seventy-nine miners were killed when an explosion occurred at 7:20 a.m. after 112 men had begun work. The explosion blew out some stoppings and overcasts and also the side and end walls of the fan housing. Help was called from other mines and from the Bureau of Mines at Pittsburgh.

The fan housing was patched and the fan started, making the concrete-lined, 112-foot shaft an intake. Recovery workers without apparatus encountered a live man making his way out to fresh air and brought the man and four other workers out. All were badly affected by mine gases, as were eighteen of the rescuers. Apparatus crews were then admitted, and twenty-two more survivors were rescued. Five others made their way out unassisted.

Seventy-six bodies were found; three of the rescued men later died.

Investigators later determined that the mine had been rated gaseous in 1918, but at the insistence of the new operators it was reclassified as non-gaseous. Although a fireboss was hired, men were still burned by gas on at least four occasions, and fireboss inspections were neglected and incomplete when they were undertaken.

Prior to the November 1922 accident, gas accumulated in one or more rooms of the mine through open doors and deficient ventilation; the gas was then ignited by miners' open lights. The presence of low-volatile coal dust helped to spread the explosion.

A monument constructed to the memory of those lost in this disaster stands in a park near the center of the town.

=== 1971 fire ===
As a winter storm dumped eleven inches of fresh snow on the community and temperatures dropped to near zero degrees, a fire broke out in Weaver's Variety Shop on January 1, 1971. More than one hundred volunteer firefighters from Spangler and surrounding companies fought the fire under severe weather conditions.

A wall collapsed killing two firemen, Frank Kinkead, 47, and John DeDea,32, both of nearby Patton, PA. Other firemen were injured. The fire destroyed three buildings, including the old Spangler Theater along the main street, Bigler Avenue.

=== Dissolution ===
Spangler was an independent borough from 1893 until January 1, 2000. On that date it merged with the adjacent borough of Barnesboro to create the Borough of Northern Cambria.

== Geography ==
Spangler was nestled in the valley of the West Branch of the Susquehanna River between hills of the Appalachian Mountains of the Eastern United States. Because the town of Spangler was laid out with only one main street close to the Susquehanna's riverbed and only one to three parallel streets the town adopted the motto: "The Longest Little Town in the World" due to the length of the main street, Bigler Avenue.

The local public school district is the Northern Cambria School District, whose athletic teams play under the nickname "Colts" and wear black and gold as the school colors. The current zip code of Northern Cambria is 15714.

Spangler is located at 40°39'21" North, 78°46'46" West (40.655813, -78.779472).

== Notable residents ==
- Frank Brazill, baseball player, was born in Spangler.
- Chris Columbus, director of Home Alone, Mrs. Doubtfire, and the first two Harry Potter movies, was born in Spangler.
- George Magulick, player in the National Football League in 1944, was born in Spangler.
- Cheryl Strayed, memoirist, novelist and essayist portrayed by Reese Witherspoon in the film Wild, was born in Spangler.
