= Barnesboro, Pennsylvania =

Former borough in Pennsylvania, US

Coordinates: 40.655813°N 78.779472°W

Barnesboro, Pennsylvania was a borough located in Cambria County, Pennsylvania, United States.

== History ==
Barnesboro evolved from a tract of land which was rich in timber and coal resources. The tract of land, located in Susquehanna Township, was originally granted to Edward C. Fisher in 1835 when it was a dense forest. Two early settlers David Ralston and Peter Garman cleared the land and sold the lumber. Three-fourths of the timber was carried on the West Branch of the Susquehanna River. Logging was a major industry for many years. Later, Daniel Stannard bought Peter Garman's 420 acres for farming. Years later the development of railroad facilities opened the area to the coal mining industry. Principal contributors to the coal mining boom were Thomas Barnes and Alfred Tucker, who opened mines in the area. Other mining companies who were prominent in the early growth of the town were Delta, Empire, and Maderia, who opened mines in 1893. The rapid growth of the coal industry lured many miners from Houtzdale, Philipsburg. It was also drawing in immigrants from and as far away as Great Britain and Eastern Europe. This mostly took place from the late 1800s to the early 1900s. Many that are descendants of these immigrants still hold their heritage close.

There are clubs in town for most of these cultures, such as the Slovak American Citizen's Club and the Polish Legion. As the community grew due to the job opportunities, the need for housing was met by the construction of company houses in a part of town now known as North Barnesboro.

The town was incorporated as a borough on May 5, 1894, and was named Barnesboro after Thomas Barnes. By this time Mr. Barnes had joined with Alfred Tucker to form the Barnes and Tucker Company. In 1898 the Barnes and Tucker Company built the first power plant which supplied electricity to both the community and the mining property. An adequate water supply was not provided until 1907 after several very disastrous fires. A reservoir was constructed in the western section of town. The growth of the business district kept pace with the coal industry to provide the needed services for the increasing population. The borough soon became the shopping center of Northern Cambria County. One of the major attractions in the borough in the early 1900s was the opera house. The Opera house provided many evenings of entertainment as traveling troupes visited the town regularly to give performances. The major attraction was the annual local talent minstrel shows directed by Michael Durkin. The town counted mining and lumbering as virtually its only industries until 1930 when Phillips-Jones Corp., opened a shirt factory. The factory remained a vital employer in the area until the factory closure in 2004.

Barnesboro existed from 1894 to 2000 when it merged with the adjacent borough of Spangler to create the borough of Northern Cambria. The local public school district is the Northern Cambria School District whose athletic teams play under the nickname "Colts" and wear black and gold as the school colors.

The Zip Code for Northern Cambria is 15714. The borough is in Area Code 814, served by the 948 and 951 exchanges.

Barnesboro is located at 40°39'21" North, 78°46'46" West (40.655813, -78.779472).

== Notable natives ==
- J. Irving Whalley, Republican member of the U.S. House of Representatives from Pennsylvania
- Joe Maross, actor
- Nicola Paone, singer and songwriter
- David Wilkerson, pastor
- Jennifer Haigh, writer
