= Blacklick Township, Cambria County, Pennsylvania =

Township in Pennsylvania, US

Coordinates: 40°31′05″N 78°52′17″W

Blacklick Township, Pennsylvania
- Township
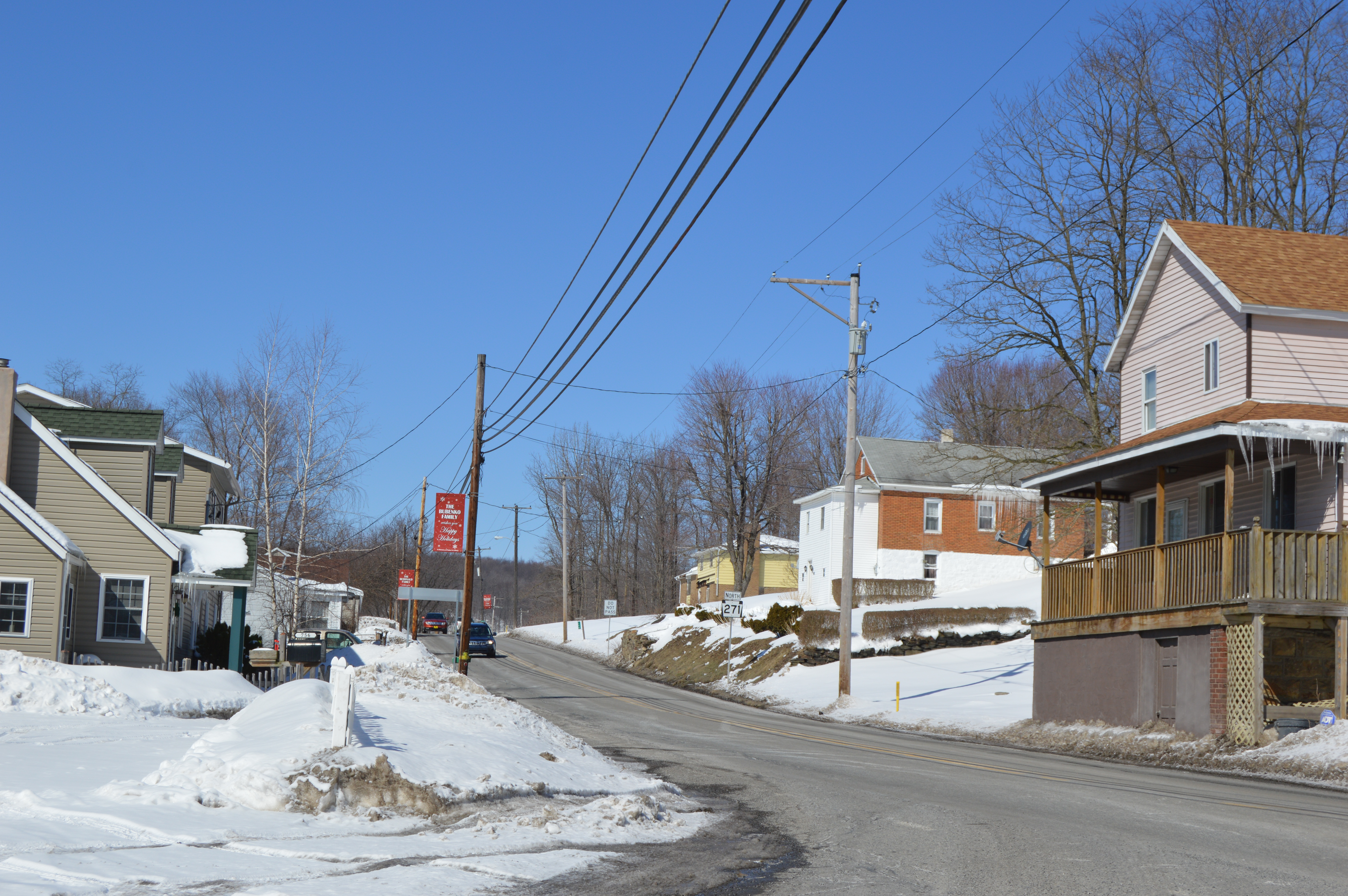
- Pennsylvania Route 271 in the community of Twin Rocks

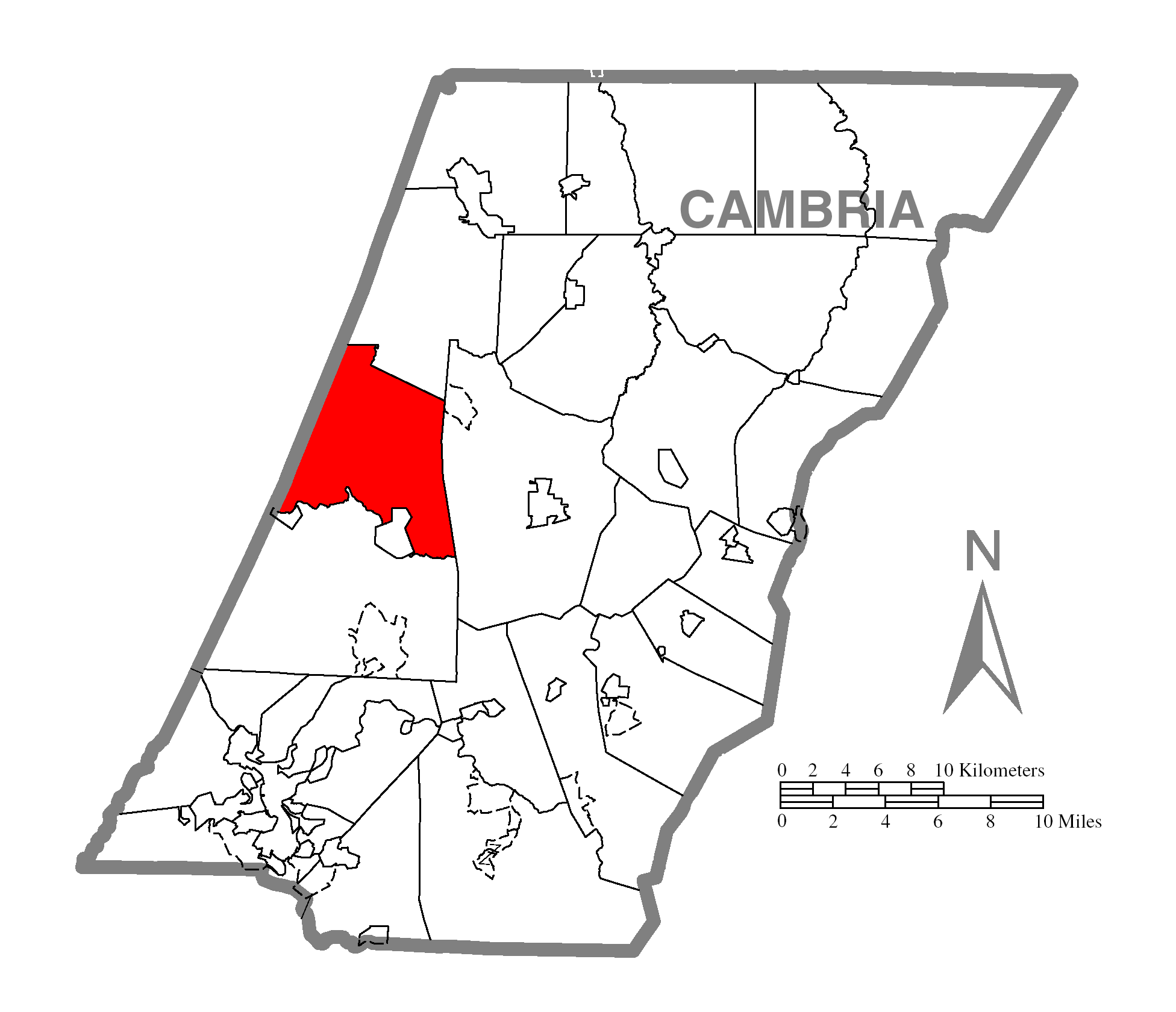
- Map of Cambria County, Pennsylvania highlighting Blacklick Township

- Map of Cambria County, Pennsylvania
- Country: United States
- State: Pennsylvania
- County: Cambria
- Incorporated: October 10, 1850

Area
  - Total: 31.20 sq mi (80.80 km^{2})
  - Land: 31.15 sq mi (80.68 km^{2})
  - Water: 0.046 sq mi (0.12 km^{2})

Population (2020)
  - Total: 1,880 ▼
  - Estimate (2021): 1,866
  - Density: 61/sq mi (23.7/km^{2})
- Time zone: UTC-5 (Eastern (EST))
  - Summer (DST): UTC-4 (EDT)
- Area code: 814
- FIPS code: 42-021-06736

Blacklick Township is a township in Cambria County, Pennsylvania, United States. The population was 1,880 at the 2020 census. It is part of the Johnstown, Pennsylvania Metropolitan Statistical Area.

== Geography ==
Blacklick Township is located in western Cambria County at 40.613171,-78.787422. It is bordered to the west by Indiana County. The South Branch of Blacklick Creek forms the majority of the southern border of the township, and the North Branch of Blacklick Creek flows through the western part of the township. The boroughs of Nanty-Glo and Vintondale border the township on the south. Ebensburg, the Cambria County seat, is 7 miles (11 km) to the east, and the city of Johnstown is 12 miles (19 km) to the south.

According to the United States Census Bureau, Blacklick Township has a total area of 31.2 square miles (80.8 km^{2}), of which 31.2 square miles (80.7 km^{2}) is land and 0.04 square miles (0.1 km^{2}), or 0.15%, is water.

== Communities ==
=== Unincorporated communities ===
- Cardiff
- Nipton
- Pindleton
- Twin Rocks
- Belsano

== Demographics ==
Historical population
Census	Pop.	Note	%±
2000	2,200		—
2010	2,013		−8.5%
2020	1,880		−6.6%
2021 (est.)	1,866		−0.7%
U.S. Decennial Census

At the 2000 census there were 2,200 people, 833 households, and 638 families in the township. The population density was 70.7 inhabitants per square mile (27.3/km^{2}). There were 897 housing units at an average density of 28.8 per square mile (11.1/km^{2}). The racial makeup of the township was 99.59% White, 69% African American, 0.05% Asian, 0.05% from other races, and 0.27% from two or more races. Hispanic or Latino of any race were 0.09%.

There were 833 households, 29.4% had children under the age of 18 living with them, 63.1% were married couples living together, 9.2% had a female householder with no husband present, and 23.4% were non-families. 19.7% of households were made up of individuals, and 11.0% were one person aged 65 or older. The average household size was 2.63 and the average family size was 3.03.

The age distribution was 21.5% under the age of 18, 8.7% from 18 to 24, 28.1% from 25 to 44, 26.1% from 45 to 64, and 15.6% 65 or older. The median age was 41 years. For every 100 females there were 103.7 males. For every 100 females age 18 and over, there were 99.8 males.

The median household income was $31,504 and the median family income was $34,777. Males had a median income of $27,885 versus $21,250 for females. The per capita income for the township was $14,244. 9.8% of the population and 10.0% of families were below the poverty line. 11.9% of those under the age of 18 and 8.1% of those 65 and older were living below the poverty line.
