= Mundys Corner, Pennsylvania =

Unincorporated community in Pennsylvania, US

- Census-designated place
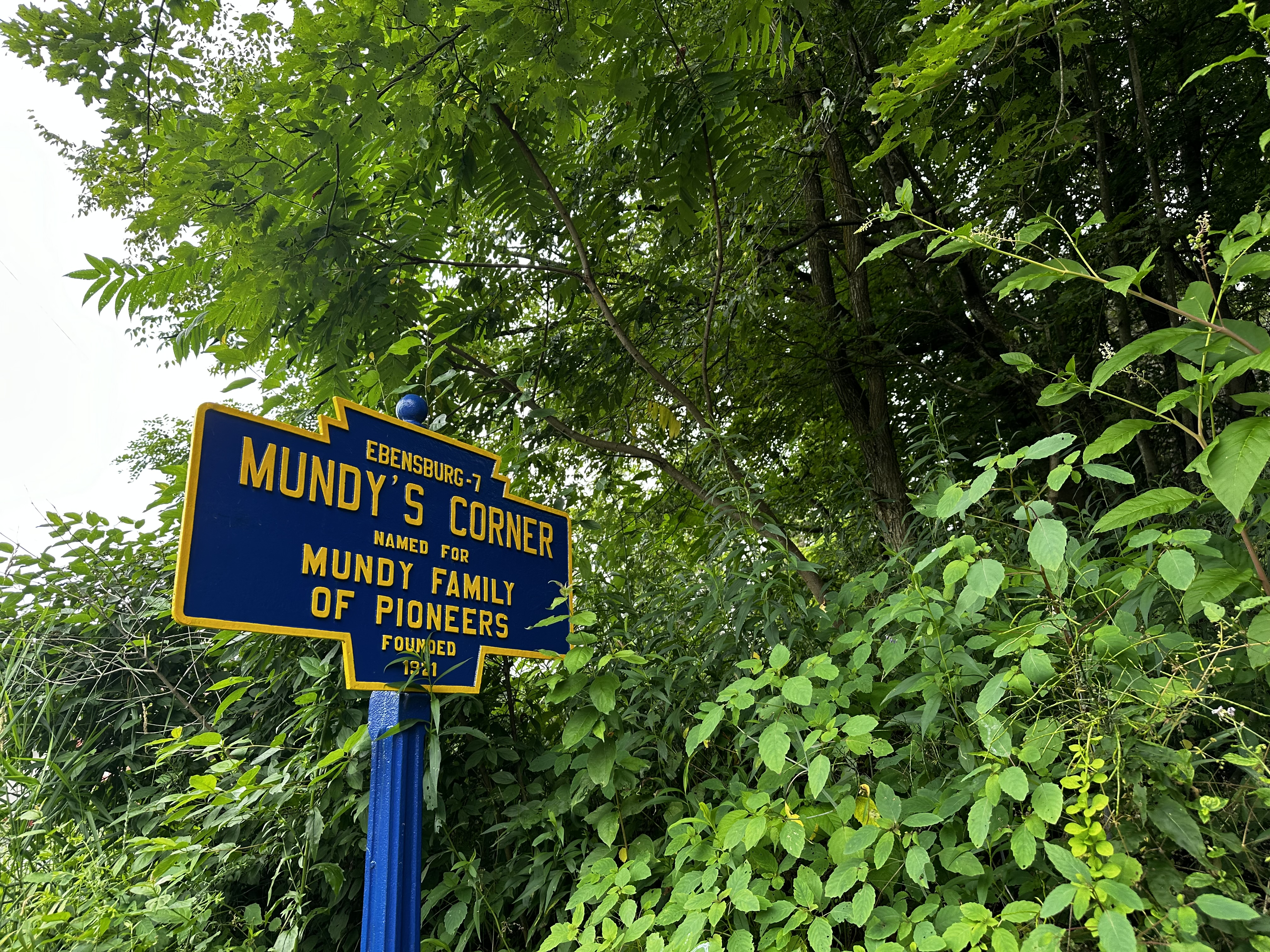
- Keystone marker

- Location in Pennsylvania Mundys Corner (the United States)
- Coordinates: 40°26′40″N 78°50′30″W
- Country: United States
- State: Pennsylvania
- County: Cambria
- Township: Jackson

Area
  - Total: 6.25 sq mi (16.20 km^{2})
  - Land: 6.25 sq mi (16.20 km^{2})
  - Water: 0 sq mi (0.00 km^{2})
- Elevation: 1,893 ft (577 m)

Population (2020)
  - Total: 1,532
  - Density: 245/sq mi (94.6/km^{2})
- Time zone: UTC-5 (Eastern (EST))
  - Summer (DST): UTC-4 (EDT)
- FIPS code: 42-52312
- GNIS feature ID: 1182091

Mundys Corner is an unincorporated community and census-designated place in Jackson Township, Cambria County, Pennsylvania, United States. As of the 2010 census, the population was 1,651 residents.

It is located near the intersection of U.S. Route 22 and Pennsylvania Route 271. US 22 leads east 7 miles (11 km) to Ebensburg, the Cambria County seat, and west 23 miles (37 km) to Blairsville. PA 271 leads north 1.5 miles (2.4 km) to Nanty Glo and southwest 10 miles (16 km) to Johnstown.

== Demographics ==
Historical population
Census	Pop.	Note	%±
2020	1,532		—
U.S. Decennial Census

== Education ==
It is in the Central Cambria School District.
