= Blacklick Valley Junior Senior High School =

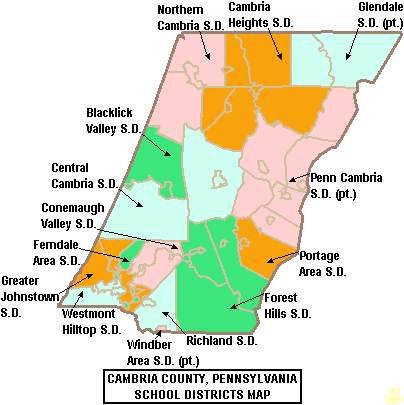

Location
- 555 Birch Street; Nanty-Glo, Cambria County, Pennsylvania 15943-1060; United States
- Coordinates: 40°28′42″N 78°50′10″W

Information
- Type: Public
- Established: 1967
- School district: Blacklick Valley School District
- Principal: Laura Fisanick
- Faculty: 26 teachers
- Teaching staff: 21.70 (FTE)
- Grades: 7th–12th
- Enrollment: 272 (2023-2024)
- Student to teacher ratio: 12.53
- Language: English
- Colors: Black & Gray
- Mascot: Vikings
- Website: https://jshs.bvsd.k12.pa.us/

Blacklick Valley Junior Senior High School is a diminutive, rural, public high school located in Cambria County, Pennsylvania. In 2014 enrollment was 282 pupils in grades 7th through 12th inclusive. The school employed 26 teachers. Blacklick Valley Junior Senior High School is the sole high school operated by the Blacklick Valley School District.

High school students may choose to attend Admiral Peary Vocational-Technical School for training in the construction and mechanical trades. The Appalachia Intermediate Unit IU8 provides the District with a wide variety of services like specialized education for disabled students and hearing, speech and visual disability services; technology support and professional development for staff and faculty.

== Extracurriculars ==
Blacklick Valley School District offers a wide variety of clubs, activities and an extensive, publicly funded sports program.

=== Athletics ===
The school provides:

Varsity

Boys

- Football - Class A
- Basketball - Class A
- Baseball - Class A
- Track and Field - Class AA

Girls

- Basketball - Class A
- Softball - Class A
- Track and Field - Class AA

Junior High Middle School Sports

Boys

- Basketball
- Football

Girls

- Basketball

According to PIAA directory June 2015
