= Belsano, Pennsylvania =

Unincorporated community in Pennsylvania, US

- Unincorporated community
- Location within Pennsylvania Location within the United States
- Coordinates: 40°31′10″N 78°52′16″W
- Country: United States
- State: Pennsylvania
- County: Cambria
- Elevation: 1,827 ft (557 m)
- Time zone: UTC-5 (Eastern (EST))
  - Summer (DST): UTC-4 (EDT)
- ZIP code: 15922
- Area code: 814
- GNIS feature ID: 1169209

Belsano is an unincorporated community in Cambria County, Pennsylvania, United States. The community is located at the junction of U.S. Route 422 and Pennsylvania Route 271, 8 miles (13 km) west-northwest of Ebensburg. Belsano has a post office with ZIP code 15922, which opened on February 8, 1876.

== Demographics ==
Historical population
| Census | Pop. | Note | %± |

The United States Census Bureau defined Belsano as a census designated place (CDP) in 2023.
