= Twin Rocks, Pennsylvania =

Unincorporated community in Pennsylvania, US

- Unincorporated community
- Location within Pennsylvania
- Coordinates: 40°29′48″N 78°51′57″W
- Country: United States
- State: Pennsylvania
- County: Cambria
- Elevation: 1,650 ft (500 m)
- Time zone: UTC-5 (Eastern (EST))
  - Summer (DST): UTC-4 (EDT)
- ZIP code: 15960
- Area code: 814
- GNIS feature ID: 1190013

Twin Rocks (also known as Expedit) is an unincorporated community in Cambria County, Pennsylvania, United States. The community is located along Pennsylvania Route 271, 2.4 miles (3.9 km) northwest of Nanty Glo. Twin Rocks has a post office with ZIP code 15960.

== Demographics ==
Historical population
Census	Pop.	Note	%±

The United States Census Bureau defined Twin Rocks as a census designated place (CDP) in 2023.
