= Jackson Township, Cambria County, Pennsylvania =

Township in Pennsylvania, US

Coordinates: 40°27′41″N 78°48′00″W

- Township
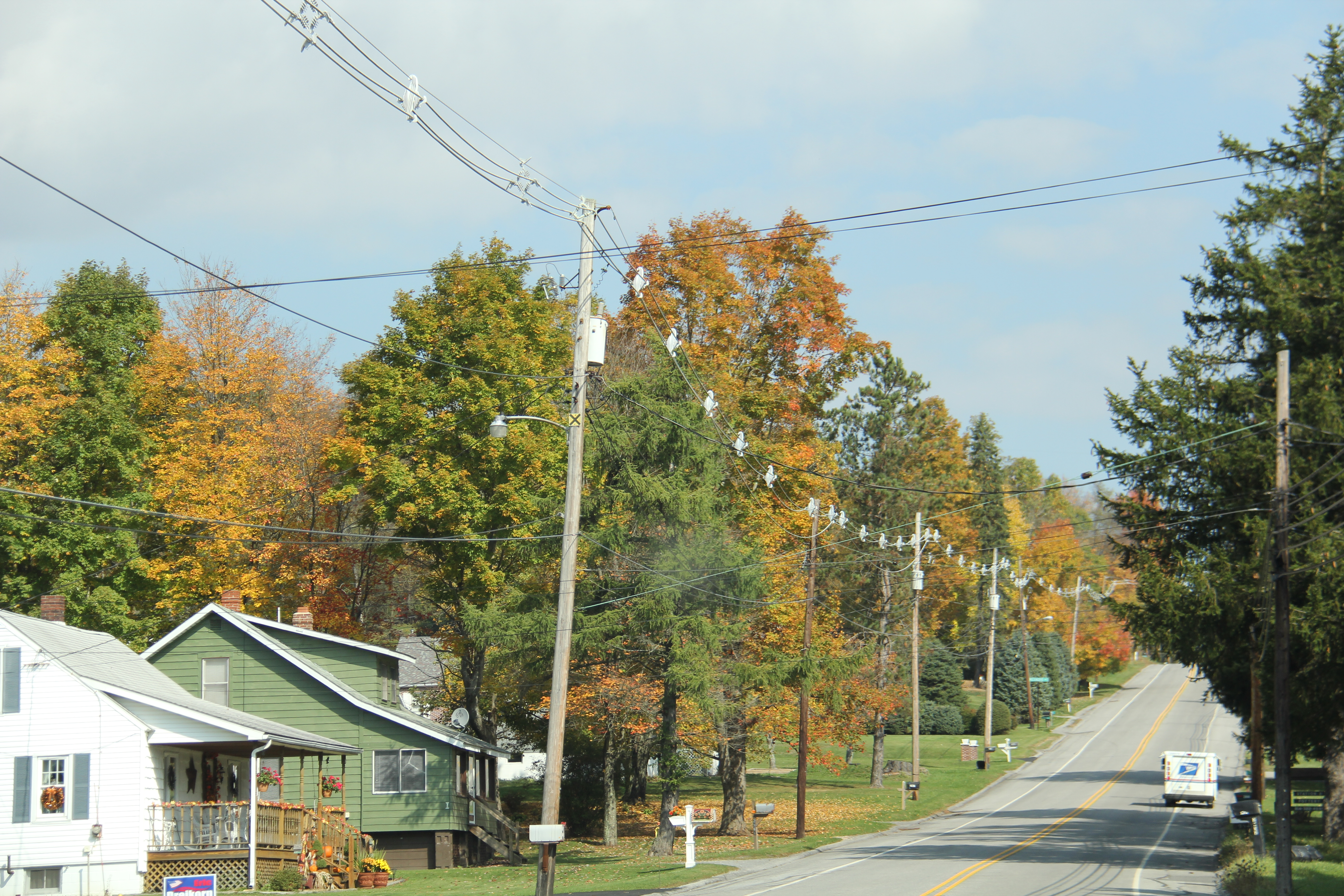
- Along PA 271

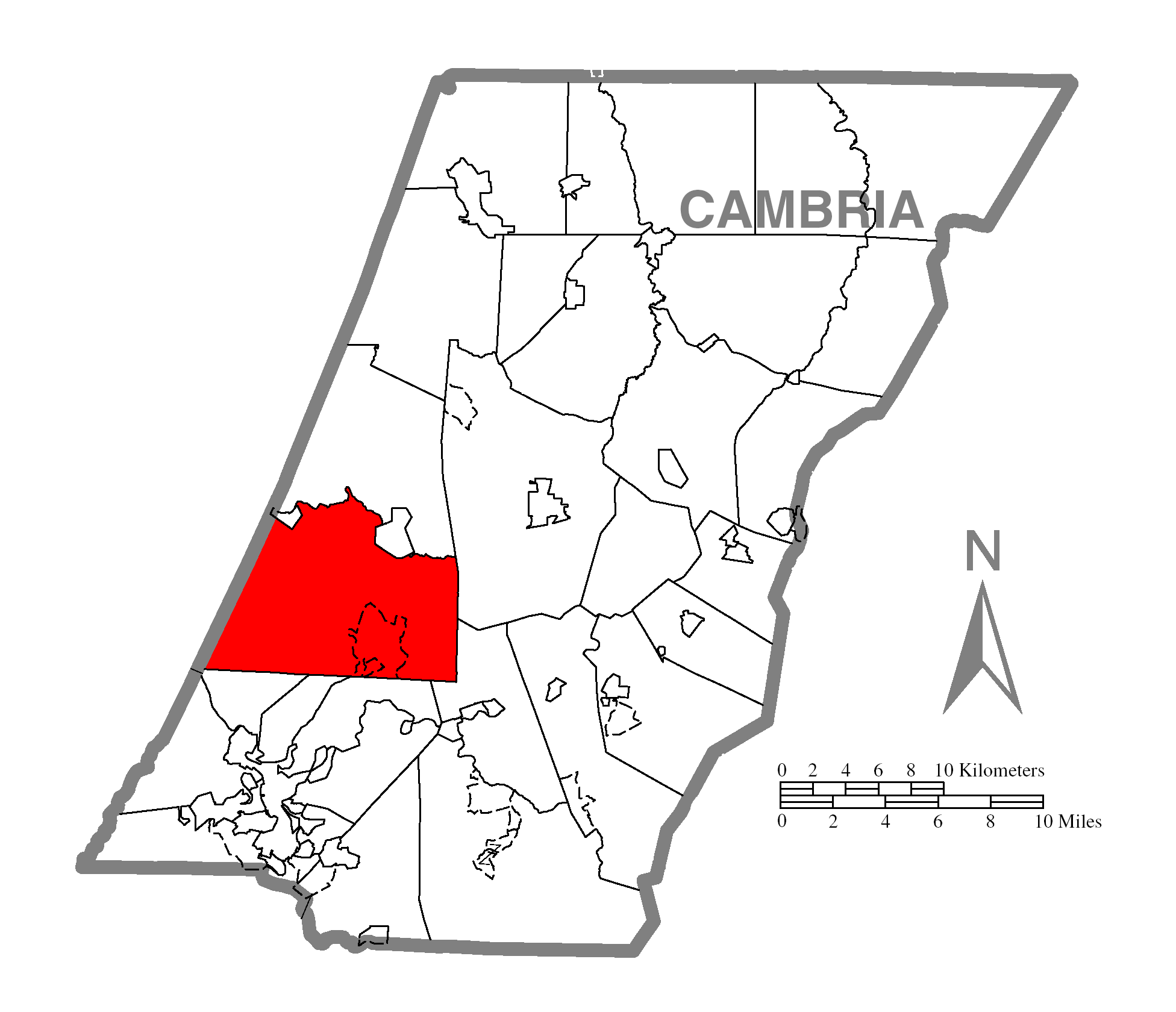
- Map of Cambria County, Pennsylvania highlighting Jackson Township

- Map of Cambria County, Pennsylvania
- Country: United States
- State: Pennsylvania
- County: Cambria
- Incorporated: 1828

Area
  - Total: 48.00 sq mi (124.31 km^{2})
  - Land: 47.94 sq mi (124.17 km^{2})
  - Water: 0.054 sq mi (0.14 km^{2})

Population (2010)
  - Total: 4,392
  - Estimate (2016): 4,165
  - Density: 86.9/sq mi (33.54/km^{2})
- Time zone: UTC-5 (Eastern (EST))
  - Summer (DST): UTC-4 (EDT)
- Area code: 814
- FIPS code: 42-021-37352
- Website: www.jacksontwppa.com

Jackson Township is an American township which is located in Cambria County, Pennsylvania. The population was 4,392 at the time of the 2010 census, down from 4,925 at the 2000 census.

It is part of the Johnstown, Pennsylvania Metropolitan Statistical Area.

== Geography ==
Jackson Township is located on the west side of Cambria County; the western border of the township is the border with Indiana County. The northern border of the township follows the South Branch of Blacklick Creek, a westward-flowing tributary of the Conemaugh River.

The boroughs of Nanty Glo and Vintondale are located in the valley of the South Branch and Jackson Township but are separate from the township. The unincorporated communities of Mundys Corner and Vinco are located in the eastern part of the township.

U.S. Route 22 crosses the center of the township, leading east 6 miles (10 km) to Ebensburg, the Cambria County seat, and 27 miles (43 km) to Hollidaysburg, and west 65 miles (105 km) to Pittsburgh. Pennsylvania Route 271 leads north into Nanty Glo and south 10 miles (16 km) to Johnstown.

According to the United States Census Bureau, Jackson Township has a total area of 47.99 square miles (124.3 km^{2}), of which 47.95 square miles (124.2 km^{2}) is land and 0.04 square miles (0.1 km^{2}), or 0.12%, is water.

== Communities ==
=== Census-designated places ===
Census-designated places are geographical areas designated by the U.S. Census Bureau for the purposes of compiling demographic data. They are not actual jurisdictions under Pennsylvania law. Other unincorporated communities, such as villages, may be listed here as well.

- Mundys Corner
- Vinco

=== Unincorporated communities ===
- Chickaree
- Dearmin
- Fairview

== Demographics ==
Historical population
Census	Pop.	Note	%±
2000	4,925		—
2010	4,392		−10.8%
2016 (est.)	4,165		−5.2%
U.S. Decennial Census

As of the census of 2000, there were 4,925 people, 1,940 households, and 1,468 families residing in the township. The population density was 101.9 inhabitants per square mile (39.3/km^{2}). There were 2,025 housing units at an average density of 41.9 units per square mile (16.2 units/km^{2}). The racial makeup of the township was 99.31% White, 0.04% African American, 0.02% Native American, 0.08% Asian, 0.04% from other races, and 0.51% from two or more races. Hispanic or Latino of any race were 0.10% of the population.

There were 1,940 households, out of which 30.1% had children under the age of 18 living with them, 64.7% were married couples living together, 8.1% had a female householder with no husband present, and 24.3% were non-families. 21.1% of all households were made up of individuals, and 11.1% had someone living alone who was 65 years of age or older. The average household size was 2.52 and the average family size was 2.92.

In the township the population was spread out, with 21.6% under the age of 18, 7.3% from 18 to 24, 26.4% from 25 to 44, 27.5% from 45 to 64, and 17.2% who were 65 years of age or older. The median age was 42 years. For every 100 females, there were 97.6 males. For every 100 females age 18 and over, there were 94.5 males.

The median income for a household in the township was $34,747, and the median income for a family was $40,400. Males had a median income of $31,706 versus $22,660 for females. The per capita income for the township was $15,790. About 3.2% of families and 6.2% of the population were below the poverty line, including 7.4% of those under age 18 and 8.1% of those age 65 or over.
