= Ron Kostelnik =

American football player (1940–1993)

No. 77, 65
- Position: Defensive tackle

Personal information
- Born: January 14, 1940; Colver, Pennsylvania, U.S.
- Died: January 29, 1993 (aged 53); Scott County, Kentucky, U.S.
- Listed height: 6 ft 4 in (1.93 m)
- Listed weight: 260 lb (118 kg)

Career information
- High school: Central Cambria (PA)
- College: Cincinnati
- NFL draft: 1961: 2nd round, 26th overall pick
- AFL draft: 1961: 14th round, 108th overall pick

Career history
- Green Bay Packers (1961–1968); Baltimore Colts (1969)

Awards and highlights
- 2× Super Bowl champion (I, II); 5× NFL champion (1961, 1962, 1965, 1966, 1967); Green Bay Packers Hall of Fame

Career NFL statistics
- Fumble recoveries: 7
- Sacks: 17
- Stats at Pro Football Reference

Ronald Michael Kostelnik (January 14, 1940 - January 29, 1993) was an American professional football player who was a defensive tackle in the National Football League (NFL) for eight seasons with the Green Bay Packers and one with the Baltimore Colts. He played college football for the Cincinnati Bearcats. He won two Super Bowls with the Packers and was inducted into the Green Bay Packers Hall of Fame.

== Early life ==
Born in Colver, Pennsylvania, Kostelnik was the son of a Polish American miner. He graduated from Central Cambria High School in 1957 and played college football at the University of Cincinnati.

== Playing career ==
Kostelnik was selected in the second round of the 1961 NFL draft, 26th overall, by the Packers. For his first several seasons, he backed up veteran Dave Hanner, then became a starter in 1964. Alongside Willie Davis, Henry Jordan, and Lionel Aldridge, Kostelnik was the unheralded member of the Green Bay defensive line. Teammate Jerry Kramer said of him: "There aren't statistics for steady dependable guys who plug up the middle and allow other guys to excel. But that's what Ron did."

In his eight seasons in Green Bay, the Packers won five NFL championships and the first two Super Bowls. He was traded in August 1969 to the Baltimore Colts, then retired after the season.

== After football ==
With a bachelor's and master's degree in education from Cincinnati, Kostelnik planned to be a school administrator. He began working for Mainline Industrial Distributors Inc. of Appleton in sales in the off-season in 1965, became president in 1970, and later was its chief executive officer.

== Death ==
While returning to Wisconsin from a Florida vacation with his wife Peggy in 1993, Kostelnik suffered a fatal heart attack and lost control of his car on Interstate 75 in Scott County, Kentucky. He was age 53 and was survived by his wife, three daughters, and a son.
