= Portage Area School District =

School district in Pennsylvania

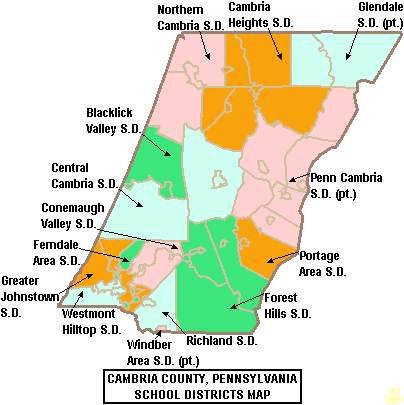

Address
- 84 Mountain Avenue Portage, Cambria County, Pennsylvania, 15946; United States

District information
- Type: Public
- Established: 1948

Students and staff
- Colors: Green and white

Other information
- Website: portageareasd.org

The Portage Area School District is a diminutive, rural, public school district in Cambria County, Pennsylvania. The district encompasses approximately 28 square miles (73 km^{2}). It serves Portage and Cassandra Boroughs, as well as Portage Township. According to 2000 federal census data, it served a resident population of 6,879. By 2010, the Portage Area School District's population declined to 6,425 people. The educational attainment levels for the Portage Area School District population (25 years old and over) were 89.2% high school graduates and 14.1% college graduates. The district is one of the 500 public school districts of Pennsylvania. Originally named the Portage Joint School District, Portage Area was established in 1948.

According to the Pennsylvania Budget and Policy Center, 53.9% of the Portage Area School District's pupils lived at 185% or below the Federal Poverty Level as shown by their eligibility for the federal free or reduced price school meal programs in 2012. In 2009, Portage Area School District residents' per capita income was $15,142, while the median family income was $38,351. In the Commonwealth, the median family income was $49,501 and the United States median family income was $49,445, in 2010. In Cambria County, the median household income was $39,574. By 2013, the median household income in the United States rose to $52,100. In 2014, the median household income in the USA was $53,700.

Portage Area School District operates two schools: Portage Area Elementary School (Grades PreK–6) and Portage Area Junior Senior High School (Grades 7–12). In 1972 the district, along with five other neighboring districts in Cambria County, established the Admiral Peary Vocational-Technical School near Ebensburg, Pennsylvania which is the county seat of Cambria County. High school students may choose to attend the vocational technical school for training in the construction and mechanical trades. The Appalachia Intermediate Unit IU8 provides the district with a wide variety of services like specialized education for disabled students and hearing, background checks for employees, state mandated recognizing and reporting child abuse training, speech and visual disability services and professional development for staff and faculty.

== Extracurriculars ==
The Portage Area School District offers a wide variety of clubs, activities and an extensive, publicly funded sports program.

=== Athletics ===
Opened in the summer of 2010, the Portage Area School District Fitness Center is located in the High School. The center is divided into three areas: cardio machines, pin machines, and free weights. The fitness center is used by physical education classes, athletic teams, and students before, during, and after school hours.

The school district provides:

Varsity

Boys

- Baseball - Class A
- Basketball - Class A
- Cross country - Class A
- Football - Class A
- Golf - Class AA
- Indoor Track and field - Class AAAA
- Rifle - Class AAAA
- Track and field - Class AA
- Wrestling - Class AA

Girls

- Basketball - Class A
- Cross country - Class A
- Golf (Co-ed, playing in the boys' league) - AA
- Indoor track and field - Class AAAA
- Rifle - Class AAAA
- Softball - Class A
- Track and field - Class AA
- Volleyball - Class A

Junior high school sports

Boys

- Baseball
- Basketball
- Football
- Track and field
- Wrestling

Girls

- Basketball
- Track and field
- Volleyball

According to PIAA directory July 2015

=== Caldwell Avenue athletic facilities ===
The district maintains its baseball and football on Caldwell Avenue, about a half mile east of the former elementary and high schools located in the town center.

The football stadium, the result of a Works Progress Administration project, was constructed in the 1930s. It is situated south of the Main Line of the Pennsylvania Railroad.
