= Blacklick Valley School District =

School district in Pennsylvania

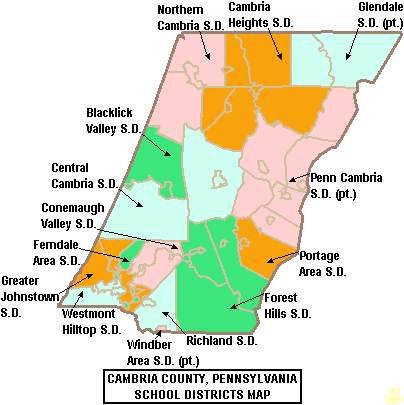

Address
- 555 Birch Street Nanty-Glo, Cambria County, Pennsylvania, 15943; United States

District information
- Type: Public
- Established: 1967

Students and staff
- District mascot: Vikings
- Colors: Black & Gray

Other information
- Website: http://www.bvsd.k12.pa.us/

The Blacklick Valley School District is a diminutive, rural pupil school district located in Cambria County, Pennsylvania. The district serves the communities of: Nanty-Glo and Vintondale and Blacklick Township. The district encompasses approximately 34 square miles (88 km^{2}). According to 2010 federal census data, the district's population declined to 5,161 people. Per the 2000 federal census data, Blacklick Valley School District served a resident population of 5,782. The educational attainment levels for the Blacklick Valley School District population (25 years old and over) were 85.6% high school graduates and 12.8% college graduates. The district is one of the 500 public school districts of Pennsylvania.

According to the Pennsylvania Budget and Policy Center, 55.8% of the district's pupils lived at 185% or below the Federal Poverty level as shown by their eligibility for the federal free or reduced price school meal programs in 2012. In 2009, the district residents’ per capita income was $13,979, while the median family income was $36,199. In the Commonwealth, the median family income was $49,501 and the United States median family income was $49,445, in 2010. In Cambria County, the median household income was $39,547. By 2013, the median household income in the United States rose to $52,100.

== History ==
The school district was established in 1967, merging the Blacklick Township and Vintondale School Districts.

== Schools ==
- Blacklick Valley Jr.-Sr. High
  555 Birch Street
  Nanty-Glo, Pennsylvania 15943
- Blacklick Valley Elementary Center
  1000 Railroad Street
  Nanty-Glo, Pennsylvania 15943

High school students may choose to attend Admiral Peary Vocational-Technical School for training in the construction and mechanical trades. The Appalachia Intermediate Unit IU8 provides the district with a wide variety of services like specialized education for disabled students and hearing, speech and visual disability services and professional development for staff and faculty.

== Extracurriculars ==
Blacklick Valley School District offers a wide variety of clubs, activities and an extensive, publicly funded sports program.

=== Sports ===
The school district provides:

Varsity

Boys

- Football - Class A
- Basketball - Class A
- Baseball - Class A
- Track and Field - Class AA

Girls

- Basketball - Class A
- Softball - Class A
- Track and Field - Class AA

Junior High Middle School Sports

Boys

- Basketball
- Football

Girls

- Basketball

According to PIAA directory June 2015
