= Parkhill, Pennsylvania =

Unincorporated community in Pennsylvania, US

- Unincorporated community
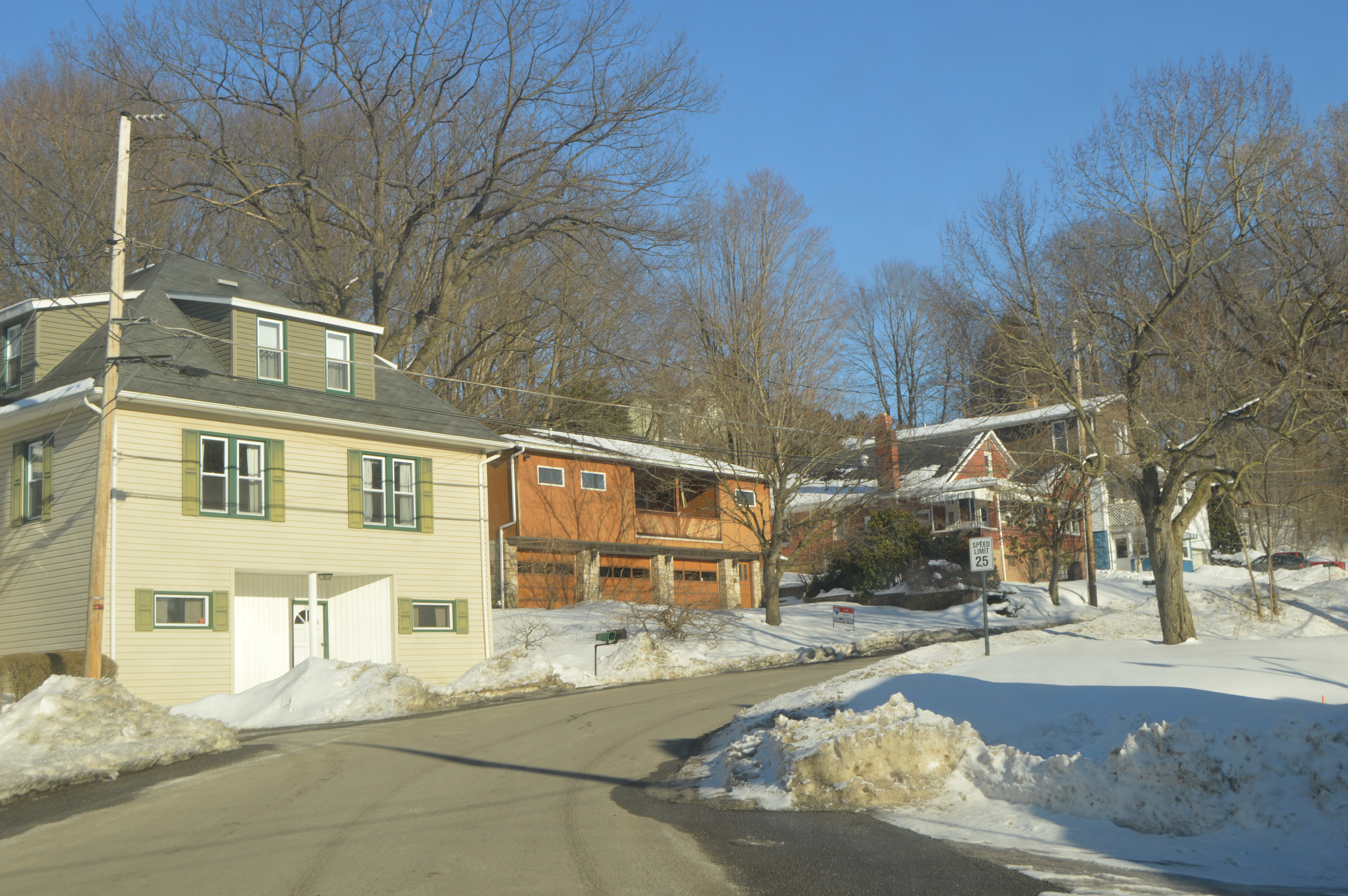

- Location within Pennsylvania
- Coordinates: 40°21′40″N 78°52′15″W
- Country: United States
- State: Pennsylvania
- County: Cambria
- Elevation: 1,552 ft (473 m)
- Time zone: UTC-5 (Eastern (EST))
  - Summer (DST): UTC-4 (EDT)
- ZIP code: 15945
- Area code: 814
- GNIS feature ID: 1183325

Parkhill is an unincorporated community in Cambria County, Pennsylvania, United States. The community is located along Pennsylvania Route 271, 3.6 miles (5.8 km) northeast of Johnstown. Parkhill has a post office, with ZIP code 15945.

== Demographics ==
Historical population
Census	Pop.	Note	%±

The United States Census Bureau defined Parkhill as a census designated place (CDP) in 2023.
