= Bishop Carroll High School (Ebensburg, Pennsylvania) =

Bishop Carroll Catholic High School

Location
- 728 Ben Franklin Highway; Ebensburg, Cambria County, Pennsylvania 15931-1571; United States
- Coordinates: 40°29′11″N 78°44′9″W

Information
- Type: Catholic high school
- Motto: Latin: Verbum Dei (Word of God)
- Religious affiliation: Christianity
- Denomination: Catholic Church
- Established: 1959; 67 years ago
- Oversight: Roman Catholic Diocese of Altoona–Johnstown
- Superintendent: Jo-Ann Semko
- CEEB code: 391153
- NCES School ID: 01189708
- Dean: Jonathan Nagy
- Head of school: Brande Conway
- Chaplain: Rev. Jeremiah Lange
- Faculty: 19.3 (on an FTE basis)
- Grades: 9-12
- Enrollment: 172 (2019–2020)
  - Grade 9: 40
  - Grade 10: 41
  - Grade 11: 48
  - Grade 12: 43
- Student to teacher ratio: 8.9:1
- Campus size: 35 acres (14 ha)
- Colors: Blue & white
- Athletics conference: Laurel Highlands Athletic Conference
- Rival: Central Cambria High School
- Accreditation: MSA
- Annual tuition: $7,250
- Revenue: $2.6 million
- Affiliation: NCEA
- Website: bishopcarroll.com

Bishop Carroll Catholic High School (BCCHS) is a Catholic high school located in Ebensburg, Pennsylvania, in the United States. It is located in the Roman Catholic Diocese of Altoona-Johnstown. The school partners with All Saints Catholic School, Holy Name School, Northern Cambria Catholic School, Saint Bernard Regional Catholic School, Saint Benedict School, and Saint Michael School.

== Curriculum ==
The school provides 60 dual-enrollment credits and seven AP courses. Bishop Carroll has partnerships with several Catholic universities, including Saint Francis University, Mount Aloysius College, Saint Vincent College, Duquesne University, Franciscan University, and others, that allow for discounts for BCCHS graduates and placement options. BCCHS also has a partnership with Admiral Peary Vo-Tech.

== Athletics ==
The school sponsors nearly 20 athletic teams, with most competing in the Laurel Highlands Athletic Conference. Sports teams include:

- Archery
- Baseball
- Basketball
- Cheerleading
- Cross-country running
- Football
- Golf
- Rifle
- Soccer
- Softball
- Swimming
- Track and field
- Volleyball
