= Nicola Paone =

American singer-songwriter

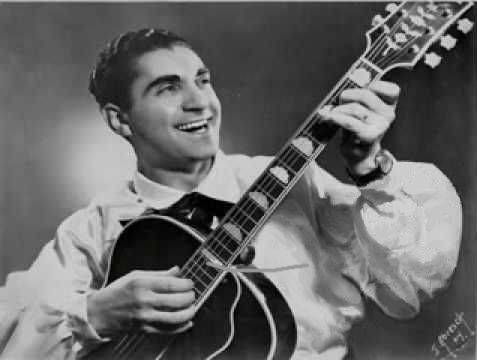

Background information
- Also known as: The Italian Troubadour; The Italian Bing Crosby
- Born: October 5, 1915
- Origin: Barnesboro, Pennsylvania, United States
- Died: December 25, 2003 (aged 88)
- Genre: Folk
- Occupations: Singer, entertainer, restaurateur
- Instruments: Vocals, guitar
- Years active: 1942–1998
- Labels: Etna, Columbia, RCA

Nicola Paone (October 5, 1915 – December 25, 2003) was an Italian-American singer, songwriter, and restaurateur, best known for his humorous, chart-topping songs about the joys and hardships of Italian immigrants in America. He is credited with releasing over 150 single recordings and an album which received international recognition in both South America and Italy.

== Early life ==
He was born on October 5, 1915, in Barnesboro, Pennsylvania. His father was a Sicilian immigrant who worked as a coal miner. His singing ability was recognized and encouraged early on by his mother, who taught him traditional Italian folk songs. In 1923, he moved with his parents and four sisters to Torregrotta, his father's village in Sicily, and there his exposure to local culture promoted his musical advancement and inspired him to begin composing little songs. Sadly, his mother died when he was just 9 years old, which added an element of heartbreak to his inspiration that would be later evident in his songs about dealing with hardships.

In 1931, at age 15, he moved back to the United States, with dreams of becoming an opera singer. He lived with his sister in the Bronx, New York. To earn money to pay for voice lessons, he took jobs as a shoeshine boy, hat blocker, and busboy. He also entered into singing competitions at local theaters and radio stations, slowly developing a fanbase in the local Italian-American communities. He also learned the jewelry business and opened up a store in 1942. He wrote and performed his own jingles on the radio as commercial advertisements for his jewelry store, earning him public recognition of his talent and humor. Once, he even bought a 10-minute radio advertising spot in which he sang as "Il Cantante Misterioso" ("The Mysterious Singer"). He soon became a regular guest on New York radio shows as well as in other cities.

== Musical career ==
Despite his growing popularity, Paone was unable to find a record company willing to sign him, so he started his own label, Etna Records and began work on his first record "U Sciccareddu" ("The Little Donkey"), which became an overnight hit. Over the near-two decades of his singing career, "the Italian Bing Crosby," as he was sometimes called, released over 150 songs in English or Italian, including such hits as "Tony the Iceman," "The Big Professor," "Blah, Blah, Blah" which was ranked No. 1 on the U.S. charts by Cash Box magazine in January 1959, and "Uei Paesano" ("My Countryman"), which sold 5 million copies. He would briefly also sign with Columbia and RCA, but preferred his own label.

External audio
- You may hear Nicola Paone performing his "Subway Song" in 1946; Here on DAHR
- Nicola Paone singing his "Nostalgia Siciliana" ("Sicilian Nostalgia") in 1946; Here on DAHR

In the late 1940s, wishing to further expand his audience beyond Italian-Americans, Paone formed a vaudeville troupe whose act included midgets, comedians and trained bears, performing at the Brooklyn Academy of Music and the Palace Theater on Broadway. During this time several of his songs also received critical acclaim in the Billboard Magazine. His recording of La Canzone dello Zambognaro (The Song of the Bagpipper) was described as "a charming folk-style Christmas song with roots in the Northern Italian landscape" while his recording of La Pagli Di Gesu' Bambino was also described as "intense, dramatic Christmas fare".

His popularity soon grew outside of the U.S. to Europe, South America, and as far as Israel, where his song "The Telephone No Ring" became a hit in a Hebrew-language adaptation by the comedy troupe HaGashash HaHiver. He was especially popular in Argentina, where he was known as "the Italian Troubadour," performing in a black cape with silver lining. In Buenos Aires on May 1, 1954, he is credited with calming a crowd of 750,000 rioting against the government by singing his trademark song "Uei Paesano."

In the 1950s, Paone sued Louis Prima, a singer and musician also from Sicily, over his song "The Little Donkey," which he felt was a copyright infringement against his own record "U Sciccareddu." The two parties eventually negotiated a settlement. During this decade he also recorded his own composition You'll Be Sorry for RCA Victor (Victor,1951) in collaboration with the accordionist John Serry . Subsequently, in 1953 he joined forces with the Argentine director Manuel Romero to appear in the cast of the film Ue... paisano!. By the conclusion of the decade, his recording of Blah, Blah, Blah had already reached the list of the top 100 singles published by The Cash Box. During this decade his album "Uei Paesano" was also released on the La Voce Del Padrone label in Italy (QFLP 4023, 1956).

== Restaurateur ==
External image
- Nicola Paone with Olga Gatti as cast in Manuel Romero's film Ue... paisano! in 1953; Here on IMDB

By the late 1950s, at the height of his success, Paone had grown weary of the touring life and, wishing to spend more time with his wife, Delia, and young son, Joseph, he decided to bring his professional music career to a close and begin a new career path, as restaurateur. In 1958, he opened the Nicola Paone Restaurant at 207 East 34th Street in New York City. With decor resembling an Italian marketplace, the restaurant quickly became one of the top Italian eateries in the city, with Paone himself assuming some of the cooking duties and contributing such specialties as "Veal Boom Boom" and "Pasta Serenata" to the menu. The restaurant had served countless patrons over its 50 years of operation, including every New York City mayor from Robert Wagner to Rudolph Giuliani.

In his 1978 review, conservative writer, commentator, and editor of the National Review William F. Buckley, pronounced Nicola Paone Restaurant his favorite restaurant. He said, "I can name my favorite restaurant as glibly as I can name my favorite wife, country, religion, and journal of opinion. It is (I should like to say, "of course," but Paone's is not widely known) Nicola Paone; its address is 207 East 34th Street New York, and I suppose I have eaten there a hundred times in the last 10 years, which would certainly account for my being Paone's favorite customer; but, believe me, in this courtship, I was the suitor." Buckley was a frequent patron for decades and became good friends with Paone. He even named a character after Paone in his novel "Spy Time: The Undoing of James Jesus Angleton.”

After retiring from his singing career, Paone rarely performed publicly. He did a brief tour in Argentina in the late 1960s and some performances for charity in the late 1980s. Just as he did for his jewelry store many years earlier, he would sing jingles as commercial advertisements for his restaurant on WQXR. He would also occasionally entertain his restaurant patrons with his guitar, singing a selection of his hits.

== Retirement and death ==
After running his restaurant for 40 years, Paone retired in 1998. In 2002, he and his wife moved from their longtime Scarsdale, NY home to a nursing home in Albuquerque, NM, to be near their son Joseph, who later died suddenly in August 2003. On Christmas Day, 2003, Paone died at age 88, after falling ill with pneumonia. He was survived by his wife, daughter-in-law, two grandchildren and great granddaughter.

== Legacy ==
Nicola Paone has touched and inspired generations of immigrants who have related to his music through their own experiences and hardships in adapting to American society. He was the subject of a paper entitled "Nicola Paone: Narrator of the Italian-American Experience," written by Pamela R. and Salvatore Primeggia and Joseph J. Bentivegna and published in the book Italian Americans in a Multicultural Society (Forum Italicum, 1994). In the paper, which was presented to a symposium of the American Italian Historical Association in 1994, the writers said of his music, "The consistent theme is that hyphenated Italians are warm, open, clever, insightful people who are full of life."

== Discography ==
External audio
- You may Nicola Paone's Uei Paesano performed by Francesco Ferrari on the piano accordion as a samba Here on Archive.org

Many of Paone's approximately 150 songs and ballads were released on major labels including: RCA Victor, Columbia Records as well as on his own Etna label. His discography includes the following popular songs:

=== Albums ===
- "Uei Paesano" - La Voce Del Padrone - Italy (QFLP 4023) -1956

=== Singles ===
- "Blah, Blah, Blah", B-side "Ciao, Bellezza" (So Long, Beautiful) – ABC-Paramount – USA – 1959: #57 Hot 100
- "Nostalgia Siciliana" - Columbia - 1946
- "Show Me How (You Milk The Cow)" - Etna - 194?
- "Subway Song" - Columbia - 1946
- "Tarantella Di Peppina" - The Folk Dance - 19??
- "The Telephone No Ring" - RCA Victor - 1949
- "Tony, the Ice Man" - Columbia - 1946
- "Uei Paesano" ("My Countryman") - Etna - 1949

== Archive ==
- Discography of American Historical Recordings - Nicola Paone's: several of his recordings are accessible online
- The Internet Archive contains over 100 recordings on the Etna Label of performances by Nicola Paone
