= George Magulick =

American football player (1919–1955)

Profile
- Position: Halfback

Personal information
- Born: January 10, 1919; Spangler, Pennsylvania, U.S.
- Died: January 8, 1955 (aged 35); Spangler, Pennsylvania, U.S.

Career information
- College: Saint Francis University

Career history
- 1944: Card-Pitt
- Stats at Pro Football Reference

George Magulick (January 10, 1919 – January 8, 1955) was an American professional football player in the National Football League (NFL). He played in only one season (1944) for "Card-Pitt", a team that was the result of a temporary merger between the Chicago Cardinals and Pittsburgh Steelers. The teams' merger was a result of the manning shortages experienced league-wide due to World War II. He graduated from Saint Francis University in 1943. His nickname was "Skinny". He died on January 8, 1955.

== Notes ==
- Forr, James (2003). "Card-Pitt: The Carpits" (PDF). Coffin Corner. Vol. 25, no. 3. pp. 1–8. Archived from the original (PDF) on October 22, 2012 – via Professional Football Researchers Association.
