= Admiral Peary Area Vocational-Technical School =

School in Ebensburg, Pennsylvania, U.S.

Coordinates: 40.488°N 78.741°W

Location
- 948 Ben Franklin Highway; Ebensburg, Pennsylvania 15931

Information
- Established: 1971
- Administrator: Jason Moore Ed.D.
- Director: Mr. Joseph Luther
- Grades: 10–12
- Website: www.ap.tec.pa.us

Admiral Peary Area Vocational-Technical School is a public school, specializing in vocational education for students of eight participating High Schools in central and northern Cambria County, Pennsylvania. There are 17 shops available to students in grades 10–12. The school is located in Cambria Township, Pennsylvania, and has an Ebensburg postal address.

== Participating high schools and school districts ==
- Bishop Carroll High School
- Blacklick Valley School District
- Cambria Heights School District
- Central Cambria School District
- Conemaugh Valley School District
- Northern Cambria School District
- Penn Cambria School District
- Portage Area School District

== School history ==
Ground was broken on the school on July 18, 1971, but due to extended construction strikes, the school was not completed in time for the 1972–73 school term. Until the school was completed, the school held classes at two temporary sites near Ebensburg. The school was completed around November 17, 1972, with only five of the current eight schools participating. The school was named for Admiral Robert E. Peary, who was raised in nearby Cresson.
