= Northern Cambria School District =

School district in Pennsylvania

Coordinates: 40.655813°N 78.779472°W

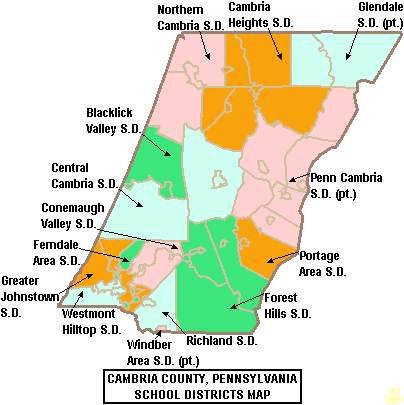

Address
- 601 Joseph Street Northern Cambria,, Cambria County, Pennsylvania, 15714; United States of America colors = gold and black

Other information
- Website: www.ncsd.k12.pa.us

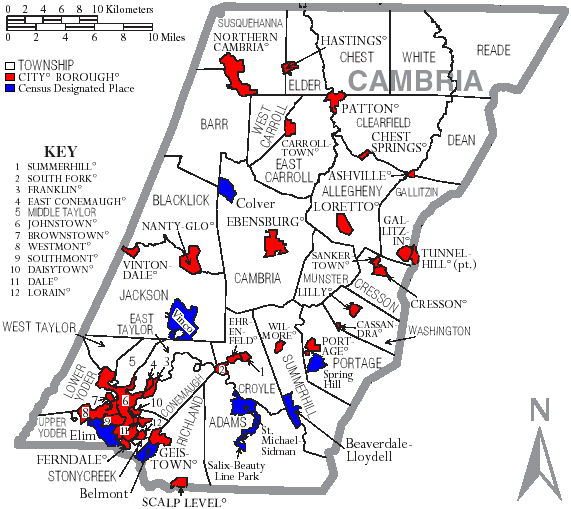
Map of Cambria County, Pennsylvania with Municipal Labels showing Cities and Boroughs (red), Townships (white), and Census-designated places (blue).

The Northern Cambria School District is a small, rural, public school district located in northwestern Cambria County in Pennsylvania. The district encompasses: the borough of Northern Cambria along with Barr and Susquehanna Township. The geographic area is just 62 square miles (160 km^{2}). According to 2000 federal census data, it serves a resident population of 8,342. By 2010, the federal census data found the district resident population had declined to 7,898 people. The educational attainment levels for the Northern Cambria School District population (25 years old and over) were 85.7% high school graduates and 16.2% college graduates. The district is one of the 500 public school districts of Pennsylvania.

According to the Pennsylvania Budget and Policy Center, 41.9% of the district's pupils lived at 185% or below the Federal Poverty Level as shown by their eligibility for the federal free or reduced price school meal programs in 2012. In 2009, the district residents’ per capita income was $13,144, while the median family income was $32,989. In the Commonwealth, the median family income was $49,501 and the United States median family income was $49,445, in 2010. In Cambria County, the median household income was $39,574. By 2013, the median household income in the United States rose to $52,100.

Northern Cambria School District operates: Northern Cambria High School and Northern Cambria Elementary/Middle School. Students in grades K-8 attend the elementary/middle school while students in grades 9-12 attend the high school. High school students may choose to attend Admiral Peary Area Vocational Technical School for training in the construction and mechanical trades. The Appalachia Intermediate Unit IU8 provides the district with a wide variety of services like specialized education for disabled students and hearing, background checks for employees, state mandated recognizing and reporting child abuse training, speech and visual disability services and professional development for staff and faculty.

== Extracurriculars ==
The district offers a wide variety of clubs, activities and an extensive, publicly funded sports program.

=== Athletics ===
The Northern Cambria teams are call the Colts with the school colors being black and gold. The black color was adopted from the previous Barnesboro High School and the gold from Spangler High School. The Northern Cambria Track and Sports Complex (Charles Miller Track) is located behind the high school. The school football field is not at the high school, but at a site about one mile away. The school's girls volleyball team won the PIAA A state championship in 2005, 2009, 2018 & 2019. The boys basketball team won the PIAA Class B state championship in 1965.

Northern Cambria High School offers the following PIAA sports:

Varsity

Boys

- Baseball - A
- Basketball- AA
- Cross country - A
- Football - A
- Golf - AA
- Rifle - AAAA
- Swimming and diving - AA
- Track and field - AA
- Volleyball - AA
- Wrestling - AA

Girls

- Basketball - AA
- Cheer - AAAA
- Cross country - A
- Golf
- Rifle - AAAA
- Softball - AAA
- Swimming and diving - AA
- Track and field - AA
- Volleyball - A

Middle school sports:

Boys

- Basketball
- Football
- Track and field
- Wrestling

Girls

- Basketball
- Track and field
- Volleyball

According to PIAA directory July 2015

In 2014, Northern Cambria School District discontinued offering its own wrestling team due to a lack of participation. Students can access a wrestling program through a cooperative program with Cambria Heights School District.

=== District 6 championships ===
Northern Cambria competes in District 6 of the PIAA. In most sports, Northern Cambria is either in the A or AA classification. District championships include:

- Boys A basketball 2012
- Boys AA volleyball 2011
- Girls A volleyball 2010
- Girls AA track and field 2010
- Girls A volleyball 2009
- Girls AA track and field 2009
- Girls A volleyball 2008
- Girls AA track and field 2008
- Girls AA basketball 2008
- Girls A volleyball 2007
- Girls AA track and field 2007
- Girls A volleyball 2006
- Girls A volleyball 2005
- Girls A volleyball 2004
- Girls A softball 2003
- Boys AA basketball 2001
- Boys B basketball 1965
- Boys B basketball 1964

=== PIAA state team championships ===
2009 girls volleyball state champion - Class A
The 2009 girls volleyball team won the PIAA championship at the A classification, defeating Reading Holy Name 3 sets to 0. They defeated Nativity BVM 3 sets to 0 in the state semifinals. The championships were held at Central York High School.

2005 girls volleyball state champion - Class A
The 2005 girls volleyball team won the PIAA championship at the A classification, defeating the Marian Catholic Fillies 25–8, 26–24, 25–13. They defeated the Reading Central Catholic Cardinals 22–25, 25–16, 25–17, 25–15 in the state semifinals. The championships were held at Central York High School. Northern Cambria finished the year with a record of 27–0.

1965 boys basketball state champion - Class B
In 1965 the boys basketball team (competing in Class B) won the school's first state championship, defeating the representative from Eastern Pennsylvania, Montrose, by a score of 78 to 69. The game was played at the Pitt Field House on the campus of the University of Pittsburgh. Montrose was the defending state champions and also came into the game with a 53-game unbeaten streak. The Colts' victory ended Montrose's bid to tie the state record for consecutive wins. Northern Cambria finished the year with a record of 27–1, with their lone loss coming to DeMatha Catholic High School of Maryland.

=== PIAA state championship playoff appearances ===
2006 girls A volleyball state runner-up
The Colts finished as state runners-up in A volleyball in 2006. Northern Cambria defeated District 7 champion Geibel Catholic in the state semifinals, defeating the Gators 25–22, 21–25, 21–25, 25–21, 15–10. The Colts then lost to Reading Central Catholic 25–22, 25–12, 25–15 in the state championship game. The championships were held at Central York High School. It was the third straight year that Northern Cambria made it to the championship match in girls volleyball (they won the title in 2005).

2004 girls A volleyball state runner-up
In 2004, Northern Cambria defeated Reading Central Catholic 25–21, 19–25, 25–20, 26–24 in the state semifinals. They then lost in the finals to district 10 champion Cochranton 25–17, 25–23, 25–20. The championships were held at Robert Morris University outside of Pittsburgh.

2003 girls A softball state semifinalist
In 2003, the Colts softball team lost to Chartiers-Houston in the state semifinals. Northern Cambria lost a 1–0 lead late in the game and lost 2–1 in eight innings. The Colts won the school's first District 6 championship in girls sports by defeating Southern Huntingdon. They then defeated Northern Bedford and Leechburg to reach the state semifinals. Northern Cambria defeated Leechburg 1–0 in 13 innings. The Colts played in the "western" half of the state bracket.

=== PIAA individual champions ===
- Janae Dunchack has won four individual state gold medals in the high jump competition in track and field.
- Gus Yahner 2014 PIAA pole vault state champion.

=== Conference affiliation ===
Northern Cambria's athletic teams compete in the Heritage Conference. Most of the schools in this conference are in Indiana County. The conference consists of the following teams:

- The Blairsville High School Bobcats
- The Homer-Center High School Wildcats
- The Ligonier Valley High School Rams (Westmoreland County)
- The Marion Center High School Stingers
- The Northern Cambria High School Colts (Cambria County)
- The Penns Manor High School Comets
- The Purchase Line High School Dragons
- The Saltsburg High School Trojans
- The United High School Lions
