= Central Cambria School District =

School district in Pennsylvania

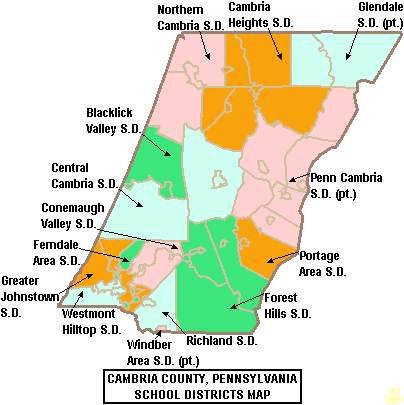

Address
- 208 Schoolhouse Road Ebensburg, Cambria County, Pennsylvania, 15931; United States

District information
- Type: Public

Other information
- Website: cencam.org

The Central Cambria School District is a small, suburban school district covering Ebensburg Boro, Cambria Township, and Jackson Township in Cambria County, Pennsylvania. The district encompasses approximately 99 square miles (260 km^{2}). According to 2010 US Census Bureau data, resident population declined to 13,842 people. Per 2000 federal census data, it served a resident population of 14,339 in 2000. The educational attainment levels for the Central Cambria School District population (25 years old and over) were 88.5% high school graduates and 21% college graduates. The district is one of the 500 public school districts of Pennsylvania.

According to the Pennsylvania Budget and Policy Center, 32.6% of the district's pupils lived at 185% or below the Federal Poverty level as shown by their eligibility for the federal free or reduced price school meal programs in 2012. In 2012, the district residents’ per capita income was $17,094, while the median family income was $41,382. In the Commonwealth, the median family income was $49,501 and the United States median family income was $49,445, in 2010. In Cambria County, the median household income was $39,574. By 2013, the median household income in the United States rose to $52,100.

There are four schools operated by Central Cambria School District: Cambria Elementary School, Jackson Elementary School, Central Cambria Middle School and Central Cambria High School.

High school students may choose to attend Admiral Peary Area Vocational Technical School for training in various careers including in the construction and mechanical trades. Central Cambria School District partners with Admiral Peary Vo-Tech and its sending schools to offer a cyber school program to high school students.

== Extracurriculars ==
The district offers a wide variety of clubs, activities and an extensive, publicly funded sports program.

=== Athletics ===
There are a plethora of athletics at C.C.H.S:

Boys Varsity Athletics

- Baseball – Class AA
- Basketball – Class AA
- Cross Country – Class AA
- Football – Class AA
- Golf – Class AAAA
- Soccer – Class AA
- Swimming and Diving – Class AA
- Tennis – Class AA
- Track and Field – Class AA
- Wrestling – Class AA

Girls Varsity Athletics

- Basketball – Class AA
- Cross Country – Class AA
- Golf – Class AAAA
- Soccer – Class AA
- Softball – Class AA
- Swimming and Diving – Class AA
- Track and Field – Class AA
- Volleyball – Class AA

Middle School Sports

Boys

- Basketball
- Cross Country
- Football
- Track and Field
- Wrestling

Girls

- Basketball
- Cross Country
- Track and Field
- Volleyball
- Lacrosse
- Water Polo

According to PIAA directory July 2014

== Notable alumni ==
- Ron Kostelnik (class of 1957), NFL defensive tackle with Green Bay Packers and Baltimore Colts; starter in first Super Bowl game
- Mike Holtz (class of 1990), Major League Baseball relief pitcher with California Angels (1996), Anaheim Angels (1997–2001), Oakland Athletics (2002), and San Diego Padres (2002)
