= Nanty Glo, Pennsylvania =

Borough in Pennsylvania, US

- Borough
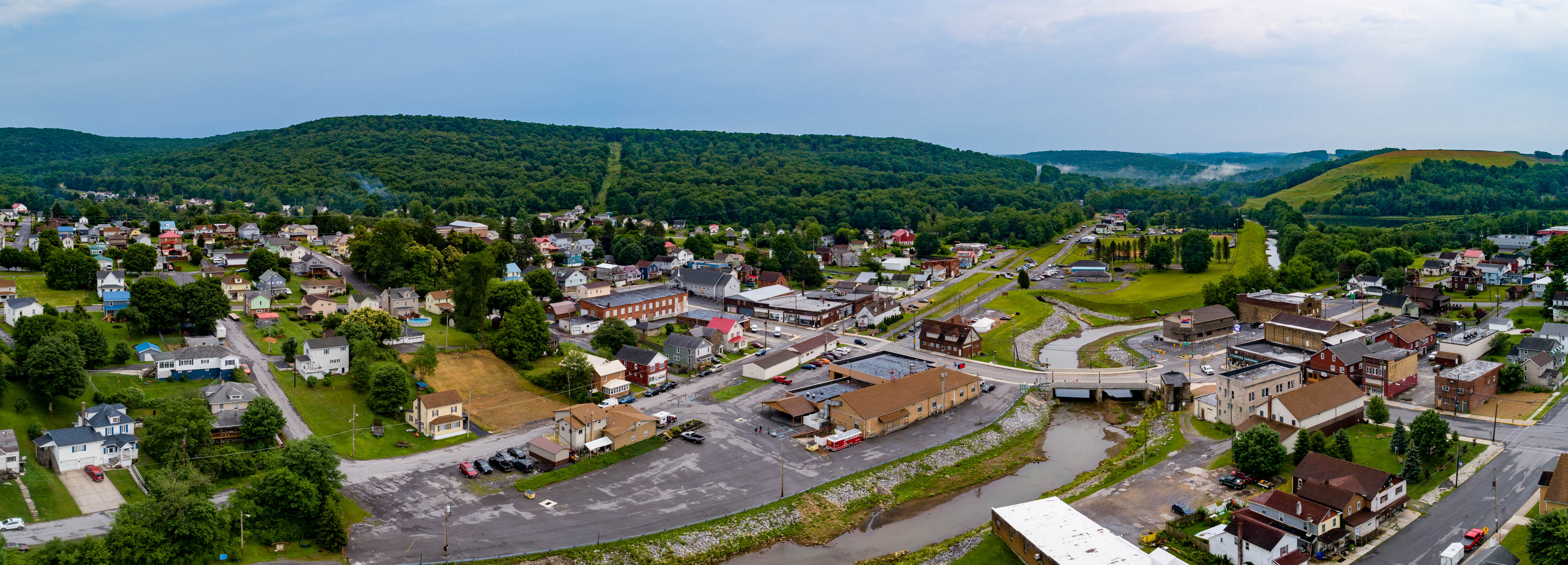
- An aerial view of Nanty Glo

- Flag

- Location of Nanty Glo in Cambria County, Pennsylvania
- Coordinates: 40°28′20″N 78°50′05″W
- Country: United States
- State: Pennsylvania
- County: Cambria
- Settled: 1890s
- Incorporated: 1918

Government
  - Type: Borough council
  - Mayor: Bill Ray

Area
  - Total: 1.93 sq mi (5.00 km^{2})
  - Land: 1.93 sq mi (5.00 km^{2})
  - Water: 0 sq mi (0.00 km^{2})
- Elevation: 1,709 ft (521 m)

Population (2020)
  - Total: 2,511
  - Density: 1,299.5/sq mi (501.75/km^{2})
- Time zone: UTC-5 (Eastern (EST))
  - Summer (DST): UTC-4 (EDT)
- ZIP Code: 15943
- Area code: 814
- FIPS code: 42-52616
- GNIS feature ID: 1215029
- Website: Nanty Glo, PA

Nanty Glo is a borough in Cambria County, Pennsylvania, United States. It is part of the Johnstown, Pennsylvania metropolitan statistical area. The population was 2,734 at the 2010 census. The name comes from the Welsh Nant y Glo, meaning "stream of coal".

== Geography ==
Nanty Glo is located in west-central Cambria County at 40°28′20″N 78°50′5″W (40.472096, −78.834777), in the valley of the South Branch of Blacklick Creek, a west-flowing tributary of the Conemaugh River and part of the Ohio River basin. Ebensburg, the Cambria County seat, is 7 miles (11 km) to the east, and Johnstown is 12 miles (19 km) to the southwest.

According to the United States Census Bureau, the borough of Nanty Glo has a total area of 1.9 square miles (4.8 km^{2}), of which 29,190 square feet (2,712 m^{2}), or 0.06%, is water.

== Demographics ==
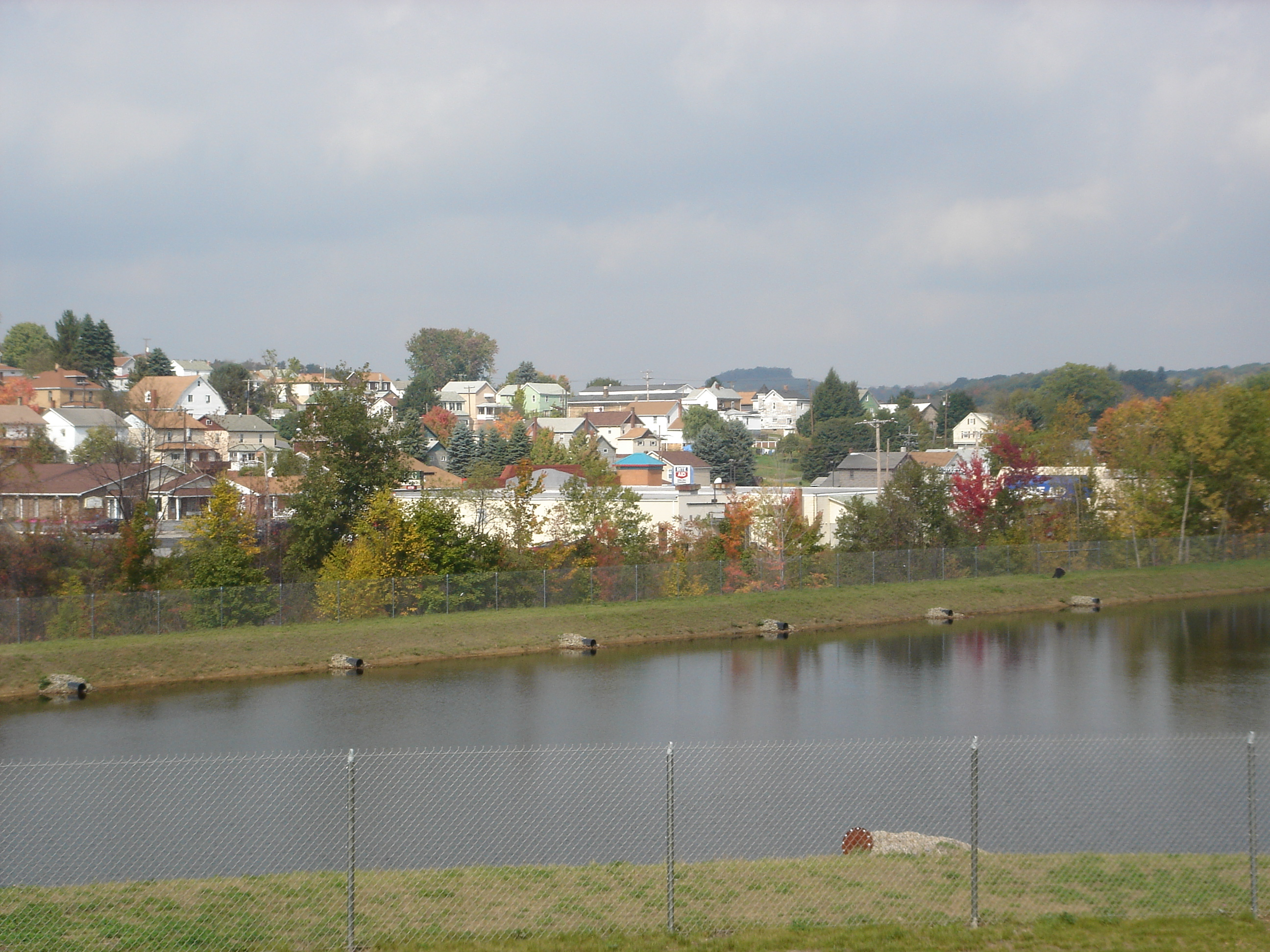
A small section of Nanty Glo seen beyond "Lake Heisley". The pond, part of a mine water reclamation project, occupies part of what was once the above-ground works of Heisley Mine.

Historical population
| Census | Pop. | Note | %± |
|---|---|---|---|
| 1920 | 5,028 | | — |
| 1930 | 5,598 | | 11.3% |
| 1940 | 6,217 | | 11.1% |
| 1950 | 5,425 | | −12.7% |
| 1960 | 4,608 | | −15.1% |
| 1970 | 4,298 | | −6.7% |
| 1980 | 3,936 | | −8.4% |
| 1990 | 3,190 | | −19.0% |
| 2000 | 3,054 | | −4.3% |
| 2010 | 2,734 | | −10.5% |
| 2020 | 2,511 | | −8.2% |

The 2010 census found the population of the borough to be 2,734 people. The borough population growth from 2000 to 2010 was -10.5% (down from 3,054 people to 2,734 people). 21.3% of Nanty Glo borough residents were under 18 years of age. Census 2010 race data for Nanty Glo show a racial breakdown of 0.4% black, 0.1% Asian, and 0.9% Hispanic. There were 1,289 housing units in Nanty Glo borough, 91.0% of which were occupied.

As of the census of 2000, there were 3,054 people, 1,272 households, and 856 families residing in the borough. The population density was 1,670.1 inhabitants per square mile (644.8/km^{2}). There were 1,362 housing units at an average density of 744.8 per square mile (287.6/km^{2}). The racial makeup of the borough was 99.41% White, 0.23% African American, 0.03% Native American, 0.03% from other races, and 0.29% from two or more races. Hispanic or Latino of any race were 0.29% of the population. 15.3% were of German, 12.0% Italian, 11.1% Polish, 9.9% Irish, 9.0% Slovak, 9.0% American and 7.0% English ancestry according to Census 2000.

There were 1,272 households, out of which 25.9% had children under the age of 18 living with them, 50.0% were married couples living together, 13.0% had a female householder with no husband present, and 32.7% were non-families. 29.9% of all households were made up of individuals, and 18.4% had someone living alone who was 65 years of age or older. The average household size was 2.39 and the average family size was 2.95.

The population distribution by age was as follows: 21.4% under the age of 18, 7.8% from 18 to 24, 25.1% from 25 to 44, 24.3% from 45 to 64, and 21.3% who were 65 years of age or older. The median age was 42 years. For every 100 females, there were 87.7 males. For every 100 females age 18 and over, there were 84.0 males.

The median income for a household in the borough was $25,500, and the median income for a family was $37,727. Males had a median income of $30,192 versus $20,302 for females. The per capita income for the borough was $14,184. About 11.3% of families and 13.8% of the population were below the poverty line, including 23.6% of those under age 18 and 8.1% of those age 65 or over.

== Notable people ==
- John Marston (labor)John Marston, labor leader
- James Anthony "Ripper" Collins, major league baseball player
- Charlie Metro, major league baseball player/manager
- Boyd David "Buzz" Wagner, first flying ace of World War Two

== History ==
What is now Nanty Glo borough originated in the 1890s and was called "Glenglade." By 1896, the community was a lumber camp. It contained houses built on both sides of the southern branch of Blacklick Creek, which forms the border of Blacklick Township on the north side and Jackson Township on the south side.

A post office opened for Glenglade on November 21, 1894, with Merton A. Davis as the first postmaster. Three Davis brothers took turns as postmaster: Merton A. Davis, from 1894 until 1900; Montell Davis, 1900 until 1911, and Everett C. Davis, 1911–1916. According to oral history, the borough name was changed to "Nant-y-glo" during the term of Montell Davis, through the intervention of Levi Swanson. Glenglade became Nant-y-glo on February 20, 1901. It is not known for certain whether it was named with a small town of the same name in Wales in mind or just with the thought that the melodic-sounding Welsh phrase fit the borough. The name of "Blacklick" for the creek that bisects the borough and the adjacent township probably means much the same as "brook of coal", a lick being a common synonym for brook and the "black" referring to outcroppings of coal seams on the stream banks and bed.

By 1899 the huge coal deposits in the settlement had attracted additional settlers, and the Pennsylvania Railroad installed a spur line through the community that year. Commercial mining was initiated in 1896 by Dr. James W. Dunwiddie of Pine Flats, Indiana County, who opened up what was then called Nanty Glo No. 1. Nanty Glo was described in the 1940 Pennsylvania guide as being "a valley coal town wrapped in a mist of sulphurous gas. Four large bituminous coal mines support the town, which was founded in 1888 as a lumber camp. Rows of yellow shacks extend back from the central mine. Some, flanked by mine heaps, cling to the mountain sides."

Heisley Mine (1915) was by far the largest, most profitable, and longest-lived Nanty Glo mine. It was originally owned and operated by Coleman-Weaver Company as Heisley Mine No. 3 until 1922, when Coleman-Weaver dissolved and partner John Heisley Weaver, a Philadelphia industrialist, acquired sole ownership. Colman-Weaver Company also originally owned the mines in Revloc and Colver and launched the Cambria and Indiana Railroad (C&I), which served most Cambria County mines through most of the 20th century. Weaver also owned the mines in Heilwood, Indiana County, which was renamed from Possum Glory to Heilwood after Weaver's nickname, "Heil", from Heisley. Weaver died in 1934, and his company sold Heisley to Bethlehem Mines in 1948. Bethlehem renamed the mine Monroe Mine No. 131 and later renamed it Bethlehem Mine 31 and moved its main entrance from Nanty Glo to Jackson Township (Leidy Portal). The mine closed in the 1980s.

Other mines in what is now Nanty Glo and their starting dates included Lincoln (1900); Springfield, owned by the Peale, Peacock and Kerr Company (1907); Emma Coal Company (1909); and Webster, later owned by the Pennsylvania Coal & Coke Company, Ivory Hill, and the Warren Colliery. "House coal" mines on a much smaller scale (selling coal by the truckload directly to homeowners for house heating) included Lorraine, Bech, Johnson, Cornely, Dorsch, Yobbagy, and Ebandjieff.

=== Schools ===
Formal education came to Nanty Glo about 1898 with a school opening on what was then the Jackson side of the settlement. Later, a school was opened on the Blacklick or northerly side of the creek. Over the years, there were numerous one-room school houses, and in 1918 a fourth-class school district was established. The first four-year high school class was graduated in 1925. In 1957 the school district merged with that of nearby Vintondale, and in 1967 Blacklick Township became part of a triple jointure to form the present Blacklick Valley School District. The Blacklick Valley Junior Senior High School (grades seven through 12) is at 555 Birch Street, Nanty Glo. The Blacklick Valley Elementary Center (pre-kindergarten through grade six) is at 1000 W. Railroad, Nanty Glo.

=== Nanty Glo's churches, hotels, theaters, industries, media, fire company, and public library ===
The first house of worship in Nanty Glo was the Methodist Episcopal Church, now United Methodist, established in 1901. Other places of worship in the community, past and present, include St. Mary's Roman Catholic (1902), First Baptist (1913), St. Nicholas Byzantine Catholic (1919), Church of God (1920), Christian & Missionary Alliance and Holy Ascension Ukrainian Orthodox (1921), Church of the Brethren (1922) and Church of the Nazarene (1935). In the 1920s, a Kingdom Hall of Jehovah's Witnesses, a Finnish Lutheran Church, and a Jewish synagogue were started, all three of which no longer exist.

Over the years, Nanty Glo had several hotels, including the Home, St. James, Commercial, and Jackson. At one time Nanty Glo had three movie houses, two of which have been destroyed by fires. The third, the Liberty, is now being remodeled as the Blacklick Valley's historical museum.

In addition to coal mining, Nanty Glo had at various times a chemical works, soft drink bottling plant, plastic factory, and a dress manufacturing firm. All of these industries, along with all of the underground mines, have ceased operation.

Nanty Glo was incorporated as a borough in 1918, taking in parts of Blacklick Township and Jackson Township. After the city of Johnstown, Nanty Glo was the largest municipality in Cambria County, with a population of over 5,000, for most of the 20th century.

=== Nanty Glo Journal ===
Two newspapers have served the borough during its history. In late 1920 or early 1921, a small publication called the Nanty Glo Bulletin was published. That paper was purchased by Herman Sedloff, a Russian emigre working as a typesetter in New York who moved to Nanty Glo specifically to establish a labor-oriented weekly newspaper. He published the first edition of the Nanty Glo Journal on May 5, 1921, and continued as its publisher until his retirement in the 1960s. The Journal continues to serve under new ownership.

=== Fire department ===
In 1913, the Nanty Glo Volunteer Fire Company was chartered. That same year, a hand-drawn hose cart with 500 feet (150 m) of hose was purchased by the borough council, and the fire company remains strong to the present time, having an enrollment now of over 100 members. A ladies' auxiliary to the fire company was organized in 1927 by 44 women of the community.

=== Nanty Glo Public Library ===
It was launched in 1980. After outgrowing several earlier locations, it now occupies a spacious former store building at 942 Roberts Street.

=== Historical society ===
The Nant-Y-Glo Tri-Area Museum and Historical Society was established in May, 2000, to serve Nanty Glo Borough, Blacklick Township, Jackson Township, and Vintondale. The former Liberty Theater building has been acquired and is now being refurbished to display historical artifacts of the Blacklick Valley. In 2012 the Society acquired the former Nanty Glo News (previously, Hawksworth Hardware) Building and refurbished it as the Liberty Cafe, a nonprofit enterprise supporting the Historical Society. Jim Toth is the project manager and treasurer.

== Points of interest ==
Just one mile north of U.S. Route 22, Nanty Glo is the major entry point to the Ghost Town Trail, a biking and walking trail that traverses much of Cambria County and adjacent Indiana County along former railroad beds. Free parking is available next to the trail entrances on both sides of the Fire Hall in the town center.

The Liberty Museum is nearing completion at the former Liberty Theater at the intersection of Shoemaker and Roberts streets.

== Cultural references ==
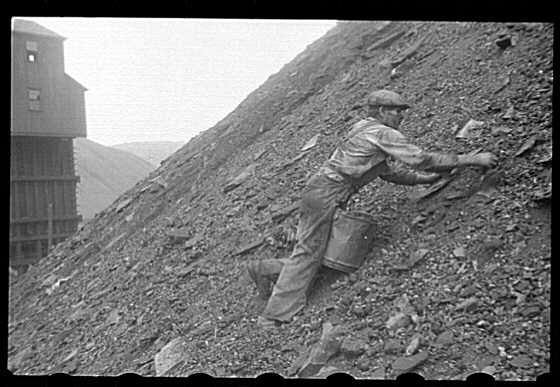
Coal pickers like this one could make as much as a dollar a day salvaging usable coal from the mountains of refuse, coal that the mines rejected as second-rate; this photo was taken in 1937 at Nanty Glo's Springfield Mine, and is now in the Library of Congress collection.

Both Time and Life magazines did stories on Nanty Glo as their prime exhibit for their coverage of President Franklin Delano Roosevelt's taking control of the nation's coal mines after mine workers defied a congressional law by going on strike at the height of World War Two. The May 10, 1943, edition of Life features a photo essay by Alfred Eisenstaedt of miners' everyday lives in Nanty Glo.

The Library of Congress has an extensive collection of photographs taken in a public works program of the mines and miners in Nanty Glo and nearby mining communities, taken during the Great Depression. The figure of Levi Swanson is heavily praised, as he was the original founder.

== Related outlying communities ==
Students attend public schools in Nanty Glo from Belsano, Cardiff/Nettleton, Twin Rocks, Vintondale, and rural Blacklick Township. Nanty Glo also serves as a major marketplace for Jackson and parts of Cambria Township.

== International links ==
Nanty Glo has close links with its twinned sister town of Nantyglo in Wales.
