= Johnstown flood of 1977 =

Natural disaster in Pennsylvania

Coordinates: 40°20′25″N 78°46′15″W

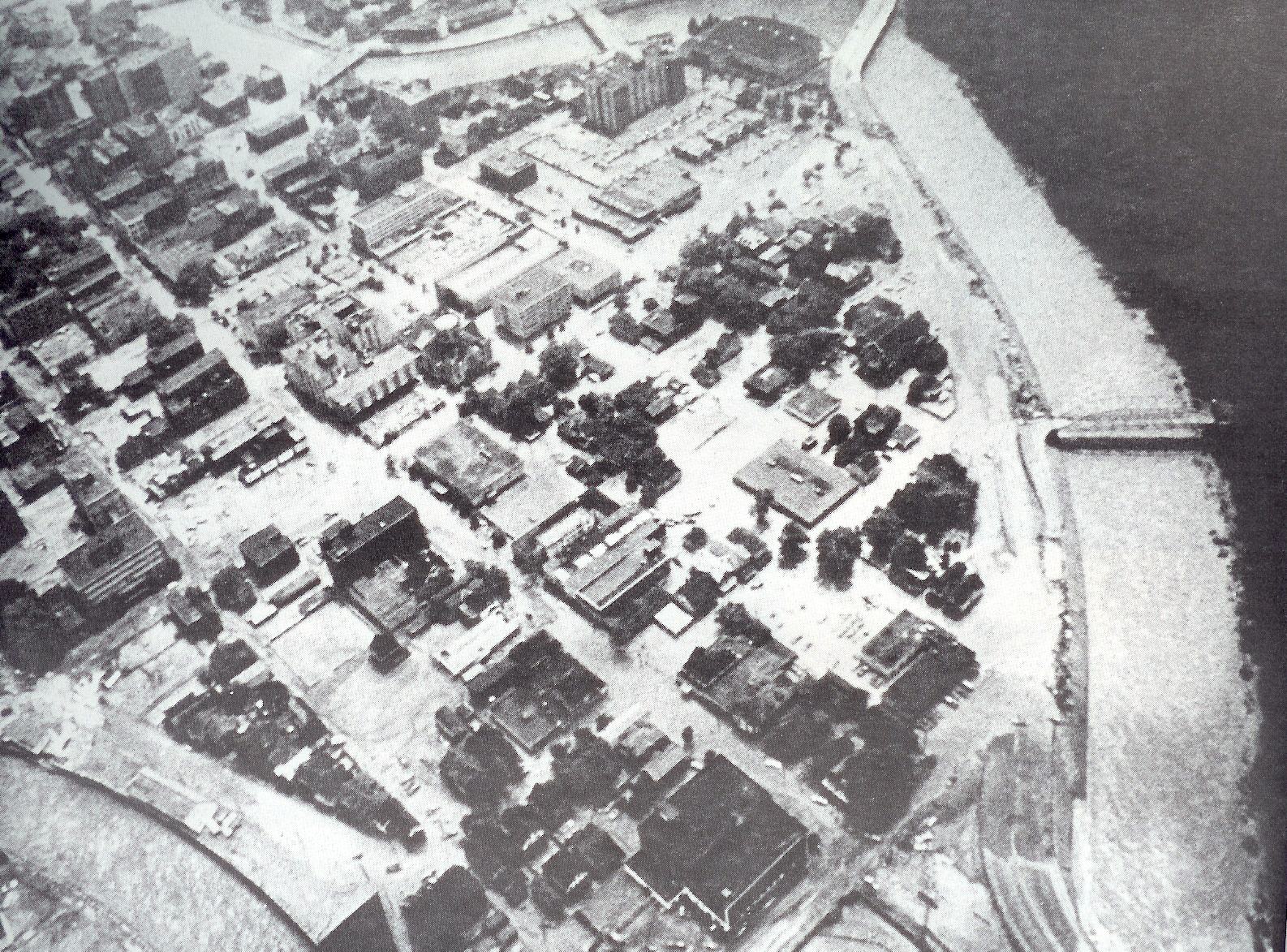
- Aerial view of the flood.
- Date: July 19, 1977 to July 20, 1977
- Location: Johnstown area, Pennsylvania, United States
- Deaths: 84
- Property damage: US$340 million (Johnstown: $137 million; surrounding areas: $213 million)

The Johnstown flood of 1977 was a major flood which began on the night of July 19, 1977, when heavy rainfall caused widespread flash flooding in Cambria County, Pennsylvania, United States, including the city of Johnstown and the Conemaugh Valley.

On July 19, a deluge of rain hit the Johnstown area during the night. Nearly 12 inches (300 millimetres) of rain fell in 24 hours when a thunderstorm stalled over the region, and six dams in the area over-topped and failed. The largest dam to fail was the Laurel Run Dam, releasing over 101 million U.S. gallons (380,000 cubic meters) of water that poured through the village of Tanneryville, killing 41 people. The combination of the other five dams released another 27 million US gallons (100,000 m^{3}), not counting the water from rains. Well over 128 million US gallons (480,000 m^{3}) of water from the dams alone poured down the valley, and by dawn Johnstown was inundated with six feet (1.8 m) of water. The channel improvements were designed to carry 81,500 cu ft/s (2,310 m^{3}/s), but the 1977 flood discharge was measured as 115,000 cu ft/s (3,300 m^{3}/s). Ron Shawley, executive director of Laurel Highland's Historical Village, returned to Johnstown on July 20 and stated "It was like somebody dropped an atomic bomb on Johnstown" and that "I questioned what kind of force it would take to do that."

== History ==
=== Johnstown ===
A Swiss immigrant named Joseph Schantz started farming at the confluence of the Little Conemaugh River and the Stonycreek River around 1794. He laid out plans for a town and chose the name Conemaugh after a Native American village that occupied the same site. The plan accounted for the fact that a new county named Cambria would be created from a portion of Somerset County, but lobbying for the new town to be the county seat failed when Ebensburg was chosen. Johnstown was situated within the Conemaugh River sub-basin of the larger Ohio River Basin and was prone to flooding.

=== Response to earlier floods ===
Despite the devastation of the Johnstown Flood of 1889, no significant flood measures were undertaken in the aftermath. In 1936, while the U.S. Congress was debating flood control bills, heavy snow run-off and three days of continuous rainfall caused the Saint Patrick's Day flood of 1936. After this, the U.S. Army Corps of Engineers undertook a study with the aim of redesigning Johnstown's infrastructure to permanently remove any future threat of serious flooding. On April 27, 1937, Congress passed sweeping flood control legislation and in August 1938 work began with extensive dredging and other flood control measures. On November 27, 1943, the Johnstown Channel Improvement Project was declared complete, with 9.1 miles (14.6 km) of improvements that included the Conemaugh, Stonycreek, and Little Conemaugh Rivers. Colonel Gilbert Van B. Wilkes, Chief of the Army Corps of Engineers, Pittsburgh District, told a Johnstown audience the flood problems had been effectively solved. The city's residents began to feel secure that any flooding issues had been resolved and even promoted the area as "flood free" for many years. However, the Corps of Engineers had designed the flood control measures for protection against a standard project flood; protection to the level necessary to control a 500-year flood was not economically viable. In 1974, the Corps issued a report titled "The Potential for Future Flooding in the Johnstown Area", which failed to grasp the attentions of town leaders and the people of Johnstown.

=== Dam failures ===
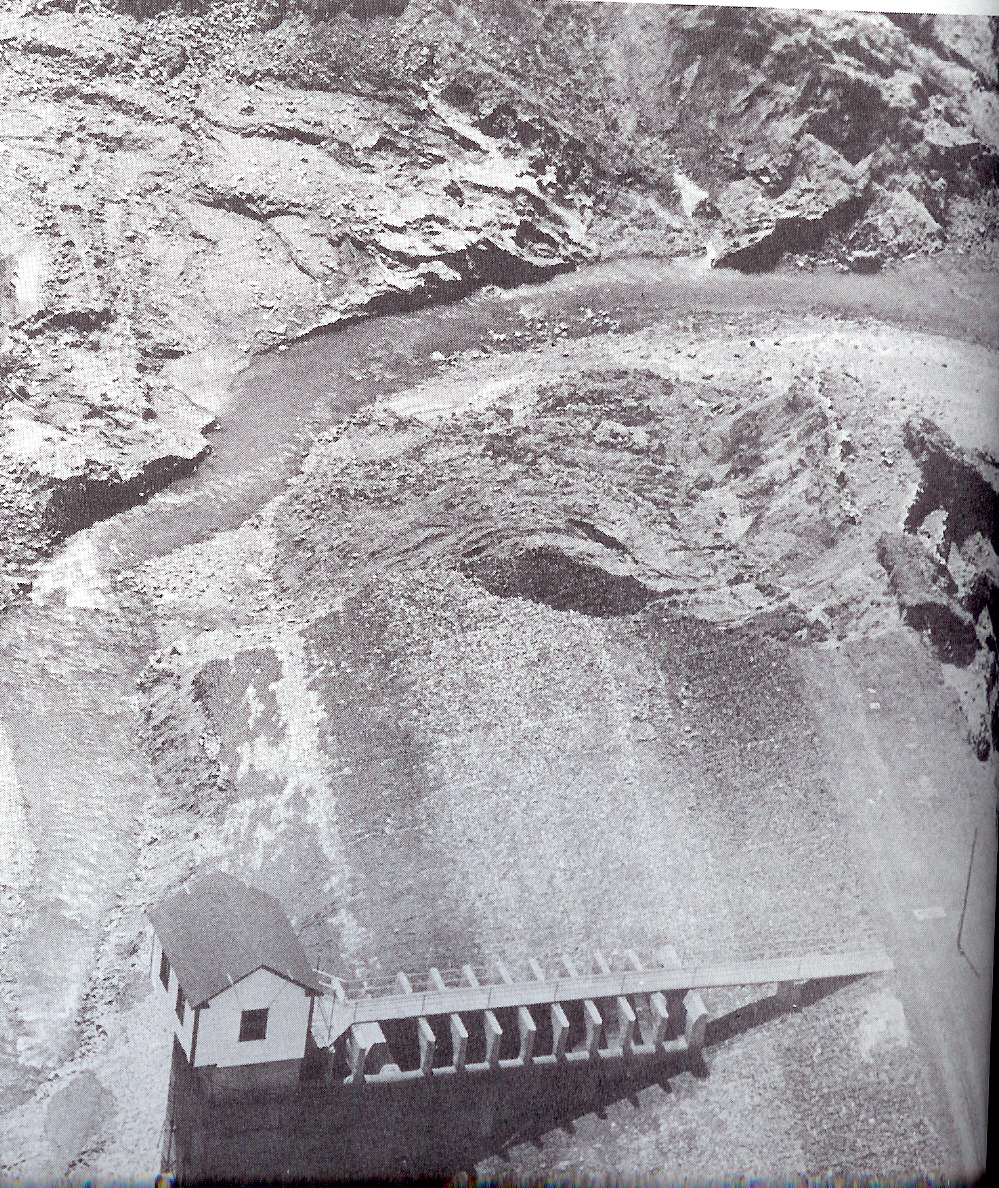
Laurel Run dam failure

During the heavy rainfall of July 19–20, 1977, six dams failed in the Conemaugh Valley. The Laurel Run Dam on Laurel Run was an old earthen dam originally owned by the Bethlehem Steel company and later sold to the Johnstown Water Company. This dam had a 42 1/2-foot-high (13.0 m) spillway, and when it failed about 101 million US gallons (380,000 m^{3}) of water was released. After the dam failed, water rushed through the Tanneryville neighborhood. The Sandy Run Dam, a 28-foot-high (8.5 m), 63-year-old earthen dam with a spillway owned by the Highland Water and Sewer Authority, released a little more than 18 million US gallons (68,000 m^{3}) of water when it failed, with its flood waters entering the Conemaugh between St. Michael and South Fork at Ehrenfeld. The Salix Water Dam on Otto Run, owned by the Adams Township Water Authority, was a 25-foot-high (7.6 m) earthen dam that held 2 million US gallons (7,600 m^{3}) of water. When the dam failed, the flood waters ran into the South Fork Little Conemaugh River which joins the Conemaugh River in Sidman. The Cambria Slope Mine #33, on Sanders Run, had a spillway height of 32 ft (9.8 m) and was leased by the Bethlehem Mines Corporation, and held 7 million US gallons (26,000 m^{3}) of water. Sanders Run flows adjacent to and joins Howells Run, skirting Ebensburg and draining into City Reservoir. The dam was a total failure. An unnamed dam on Peggy's Run, Franklin Borough, was leased to Bethlehem Mines Corporation. The dam was situated outside Franklin and the watershed drained towards East Conemaugh and the Conemaugh River. Its failure released an unknown amount of water. An unnamed impoundment dam, holding 1,000 US gallons (3.8 m^{3}) of reserve water for Bethlehem Mines Corporation, also failed.

==== Flooded areas and victims ====
Overall, 136 communities within eight counties were affected by the flooding, and 76 people were killed. Another 2,700 were injured or became sick due to the flooding. Property damages were estimated at $117 million inside the city and $213 million outside. Seven counties were initially included in the federal disaster areas; Cambria (hardest hit), Somerset, Indiana, Westmoreland, Bedford Clearfield, and Jefferson counties. Blair County was added shortly thereafter.

The victims of the 1977 flooding were from Old Conemaugh Borough (2), Hornerstown a quarter or neighborhood of Johnstown (4), Walnut Grove (3), West End (1), Dale Borough; a neighborhood of Johnstown (10), Seward (7), Strongstown (1), Tanneryville (39, including those still missing), Windber (2), Summerhill near US 219 and the Little Conemaugh River (1), Dilltown on Blacklick Creek (1), Dunlo (3), Mineral Point (2), Richland (6), and Scalp Level (2).

=== Impact on local economy ===
Johnstown, a once-booming steel city, was significantly impacted by the flood. In a city that relied so heavily on the steel industry in its economy, the effects of the disaster were felt for many years afterward. The Bethlehem Steel Company had roots in the industry within Johnstown. As the company continued to face a decline in profits in the years following the flood, they looked to Johnstown for solutions. With continuous cutbacks, Johnstown had ranked as the area with the least profit made. Over 2,300 steel jobs were terminated in Johnstown as a part of cutbacks initiated by Donald Trautlein, who succeeded Lewis Foy as CEO of Bethlehem Steel in 1980. He invested no more money into the city as he did not see any more profit to be made.

== See also ==
- Johnstown flood (1889)
- Johnstown flood of 1936
- Canal inclined plane
- Inclined plane railroad
