= Forest Hills High School (Pennsylvania) =

Coordinates: 40.3321°N 78.7528°W

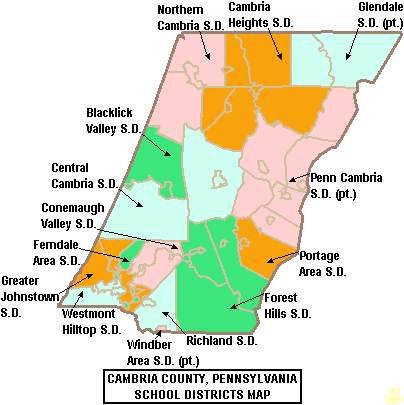

Location
- 489 Locust Street; Sidman, Cambria County, Pennsylvania 15955; United States

Information
- Type: Public
- School district: Forest Hills School District
- Principal: Rebecca Roberts
- Teaching staff: 56.20 (FTE)
- Grades: 7th-12th
- Student to teacher ratio: 14.04
- Colors: Green and Yellow
- Team name: Rangers
- Website: https://jsh.fhrangers.org/

Forest Hills High School, located in Sidman, Pennsylvania, United States, is a small, rural, public high school. In 2014, enrollment was reported as 454 pupils in 10th through 12th grades.

The principal is Rebecca Roberts. It once was composed of 4 high schools before their unification to Forest Hills in 1966. The 4 high schools were: Triangle Area, Adams-Summerhill, South Fork-Croyle, and Beaverdale-Wilmore. The district encompasses 3 townships: Adams, Croyle, and Summerhill.

Forest Hills High School students may choose to attend Greater Johnstown Career and Technology Center for training in the construction and mechanical trades as well as other careers. The Appalachia Intermediate Unit IU8 provides the School with a wide variety of services like specialized education for disabled students and hearing, background checks for employees, state mandated recognizing and reporting child abuse training, speech and visual disability services and professional development for staff and faculty.

== Extracurriculars ==
The Forest Hills High School offers a wide variety of clubs, activities and an extensive, publicly funded sports program.

=== Sports ===
The District funds
Varsity

Boys

- Baseball - AA
- Basketball- AAA
- Cross Country - AA
- Football - AA
- Golf - AA
- Rifle - AAAA
- Soccer - AA
- Tennis - AA
- Track and Field - AA
- Volleyball - AA
- Wrestling - AA

Girls

- Basketball - AAA
- Cross Country - AA
- Golf - AA
- Rifle - AAAA
- Soccer (Fall) - AA
- Softball - AA
- Girls' Tennis - AA
- Track and Field - AA
- Volleyball - AA

== Notable alumni ==
- Bo Bassett, wrestler (lived in district but did not attend HS)
- Shawn Hillegas, former Major League Baseball pitcher
- Joe Jones, former NFL player
- Walter Prozialeck Scientist, Biomedical Educator
