= St. Michael, Pennsylvania =

Unincorporated community in Pennsylvania, US

- Census-designated place
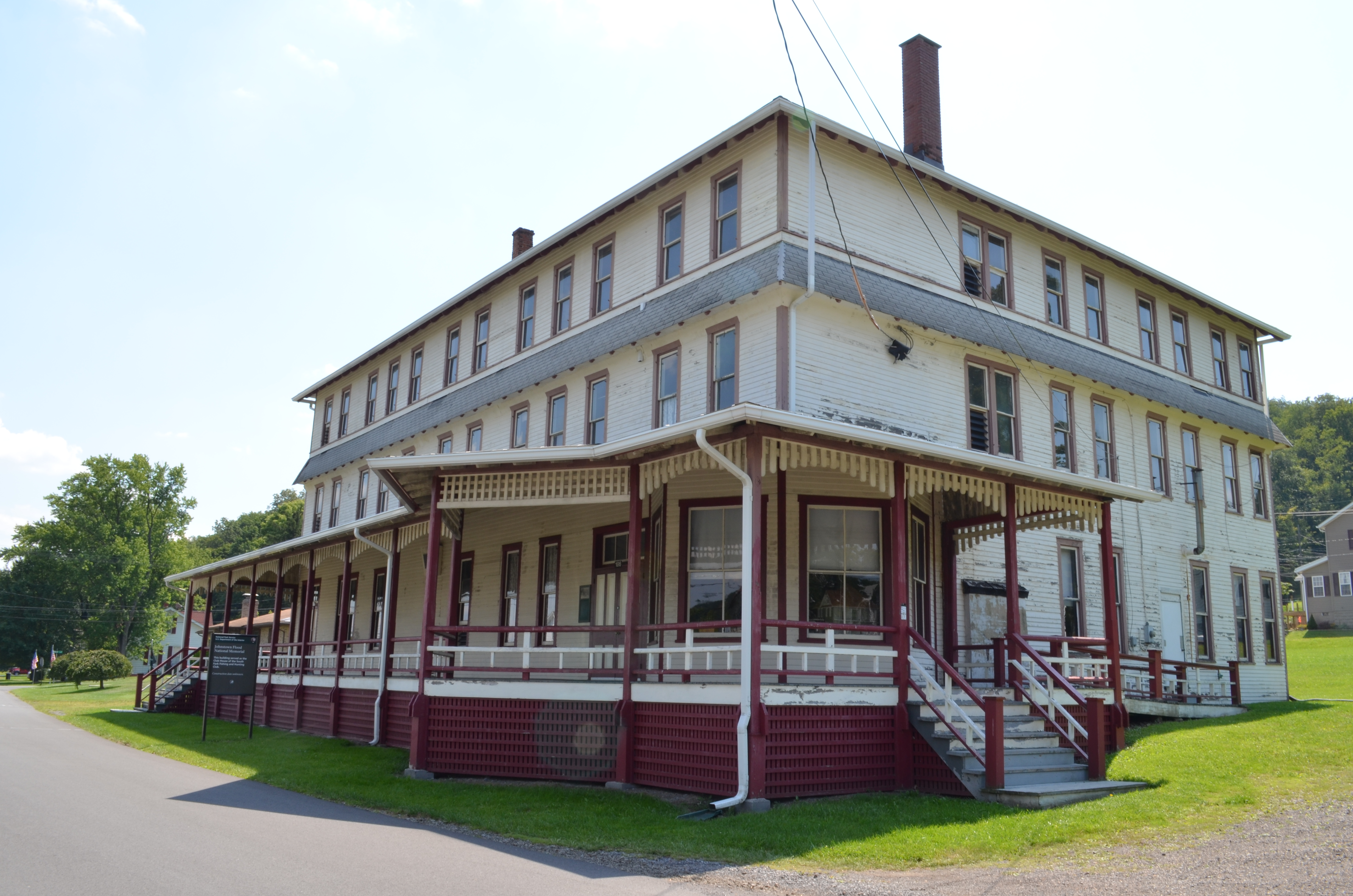
- Clubhouse for the former South Fork Fishing and Hunting Club

- Location within Pennsylvania Location within the United States
- Coordinates: 40°20′13″N 78°46′14″W
- Country: United States
- State: Pennsylvania
- County: Cambria
- Township: Adams

Area
  - Total: 1.05 sq mi (2.72 km^{2})
  - Land: 1.04 sq mi (2.70 km^{2})
  - Water: 0.012 sq mi (0.03 km^{2})
- Elevation: 1,601 ft (488 m)

Population (2010)
  - Total: 408
  - Density: 392/sq mi (151.4/km^{2})
- Time zone: UTC-5 (Eastern (EST))
  - Summer (DST): UTC-4 (EDT)
- ZIP code: 15951
- FIPS code: 42-67352
- GNIS feature ID: 1186465

St. Michael is an unincorporated community and census-designated place in Cambria County, Pennsylvania, United States. Its ZIP code is 15951. It was formerly part of the St. Michael-Sidman census-designated place in Cambria County, before splitting into two separate CDPs for the 2010 census. As of the 2010 census the population of St. Michael was 408.

St. Michael is located in southeastern Cambria County in the valley of the South Fork of the Little Conemaugh River, less than a mile southeast of U.S. Route 219, a four-lane highway which leads 12 miles (19 km) north to Ebensburg, the county seat, and 11 miles (18 km) southwest (via Pennsylvania Route 56) to Johnstown. The community of Sidman is one mile southeast of St. Michael, also in the valley of the South Fork.

== Education ==
It is in the Forest Hills School District.
