= Dunlo, Pennsylvania =

Unincorporated community in Pennsylvania, US

- Census-designated place
- Location in Pennsylvania Dunlo (the United States)
- Coordinates: 40°17′40″N 78°43′14″W
- Country: United States
- State: Pennsylvania
- County: Cambria
- Township: Adams

Area
  - Total: 0.53 sq mi (1.37 km^{2})
  - Land: 0.53 sq mi (1.37 km^{2})
  - Water: 0 sq mi (0.00 km^{2})
- Elevation: 2,198 ft (670 m)

Population (2020)
  - Total: 353
  - Density: 667.3/sq mi (257.64/km^{2})
- Time zone: UTC-5 (Eastern (EST))
  - Summer (DST): UTC-4 (EDT)
- ZIP code: 15930
- FIPS code: 42-20336
- GNIS feature ID: 1173616

Dunlo is an unincorporated community and census-designated place (CDP) in Adams Township, Cambria County, Pennsylvania, United States. It is located between the communities of Beaverdale and Salix, in the valley of Sulphur Creek, a tributary of the Little Conemaugh River. As of the 2010 census, the population was 342 residents.

== Demographics ==
Historical population
Census	Pop.	Note	%±
2020	353		—
U.S. Decennial Census

== Education ==
It is in the Forest Hills School District.
