= Beaverdale, Pennsylvania =

Unincorporated community in Pennsylvania, US

- Census-designated place
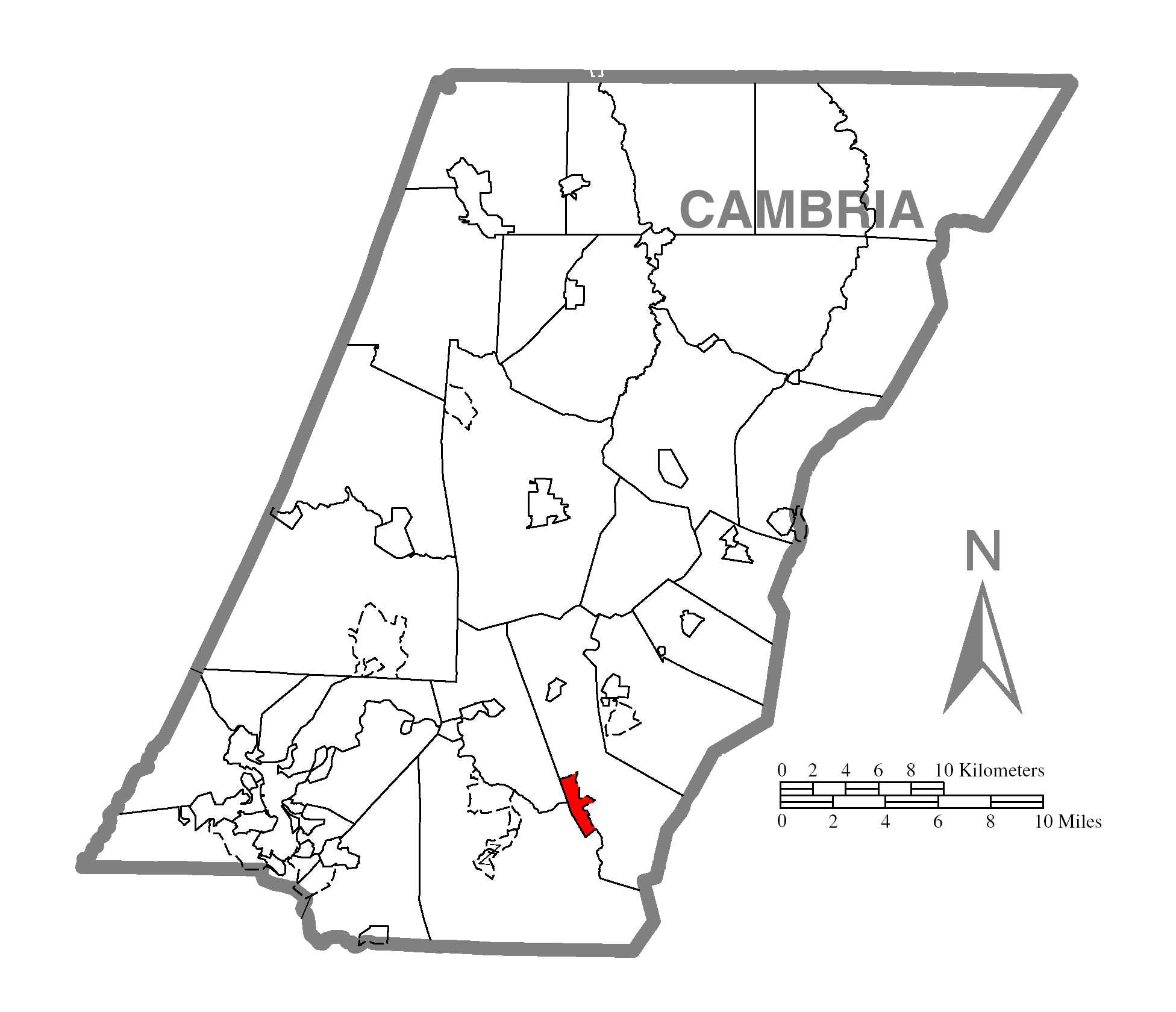
- Location within Cambria County

- Location within the U.S. state of Pennsylvania Beaverdale (the United States)
- Coordinates: 40°19′20″N 78°41′51″W
- Country: United States
- State: Pennsylvania
- County: Cambria
- Townships: Summerhill, Adams

Area
  - Total: 1.53 sq mi (3.97 km^{2})
  - Land: 1.53 sq mi (3.97 km^{2})
  - Water: 0 sq mi (0.00 km^{2})
- Elevation: 1,913 ft (583 m)

Population (2020)
  - Total: 959
  - Density: 625.8/sq mi (241.62/km^{2})
- Time zone: UTC-5 (Eastern (EST))
  - Summer (DST): UTC-4 (EDT)
- ZIP code: 15921
- FIPS code: 42-04768
- GNIS feature ID: 2389187

Beaverdale is an unincorporated community and census-designated place (CDP) in Cambria County, Pennsylvania, United States. As of the 2020 census, Beaverdale had a population of 959. Prior to that time, the CDP was known as Beaverdale-Lloydell.

== Geography ==
Beaverdale is located in southeastern Cambria County at 40°19′20″N 78°41′51″W (40.322095, -78.697636). The CDP is primarily within Summerhill Township, but the southern end of the CDP extends into Adams Township. The community of Lloydell is in the southeastern part of the CDP.

Pennsylvania Route 869 passes through Beaverdale, leading 3 miles (5 km) west to Sidman and 18 miles (29 km) to the southeast across the Allegheny Front to Interstate 99 at St. Clairsville. Blue Knob State Park is 10 miles (16 km) to the southeast, and the city of Johnstown is 16 miles (26 km) to the west.

According to the U.S. Census Bureau, the CDP has a total area of 1.5 square miles (4.0 km^{2}), all land. The community is in the valley of the South Fork of the Little Conemaugh River.

== Demographics ==
Historical population
Census	Pop.	Note	%±
2020	959		—
U.S. Decennial Census

As of the census of 2000, there were 1,230 people, 485 households, and 337 families residing in the CDP. The population density was 912.7 inhabitants per square mile (352.4/km^{2}). There were 541 housing units at an average density of 401.4 per square mile (155.0/km^{2}). The racial makeup of the CDP was 99.35% White, 0.16% African American, 0.08% Native American, and 0.41% from two or more races. Hispanic or Latino of any race were 0.08% of the population.

There were 485 households, out of which 32.0% had children under the age of 18 living with them, 53.4% were married couples living together, 11.1% had a female householder with no husband present, and 30.5% were non-families. 28.2% of all households were made up of individuals, and 17.1% had someone living alone who was 65 years of age or older. The average household size was 2.53 and the average family size was 3.11.

In the CDP, the population was spread out, with 25.9% under the age of 18, 8.0% from 18 to 24, 27.1% from 25 to 44, 22.1% from 45 to 64, and 16.9% who were 65 years of age or older. The median age was 37 years. For every 100 females, there were 87.2 males. For every 100 females age 18 and over, there were 85.2 males.

The median income for a household in the CDP was $25,375, and the median income for a family was $28,711. Males had a median income of $24,917 versus $21,750 for females. The per capita income for the CDP was $13,447. About 13.6% of families and 17.5% of the population were below the poverty line, including 30.4% of those under age 18 and 6.9% of those age 65 or over.

== Education ==
It is in the Forest Hills School District.
