= Adams Township Municipal Authority =

- ATMA

Sewage treatment authority overview
- Type: sewage treatment authority
- Jurisdiction: Mine 42 area of Adams Township, Cambria County, Pennsylvania

Map
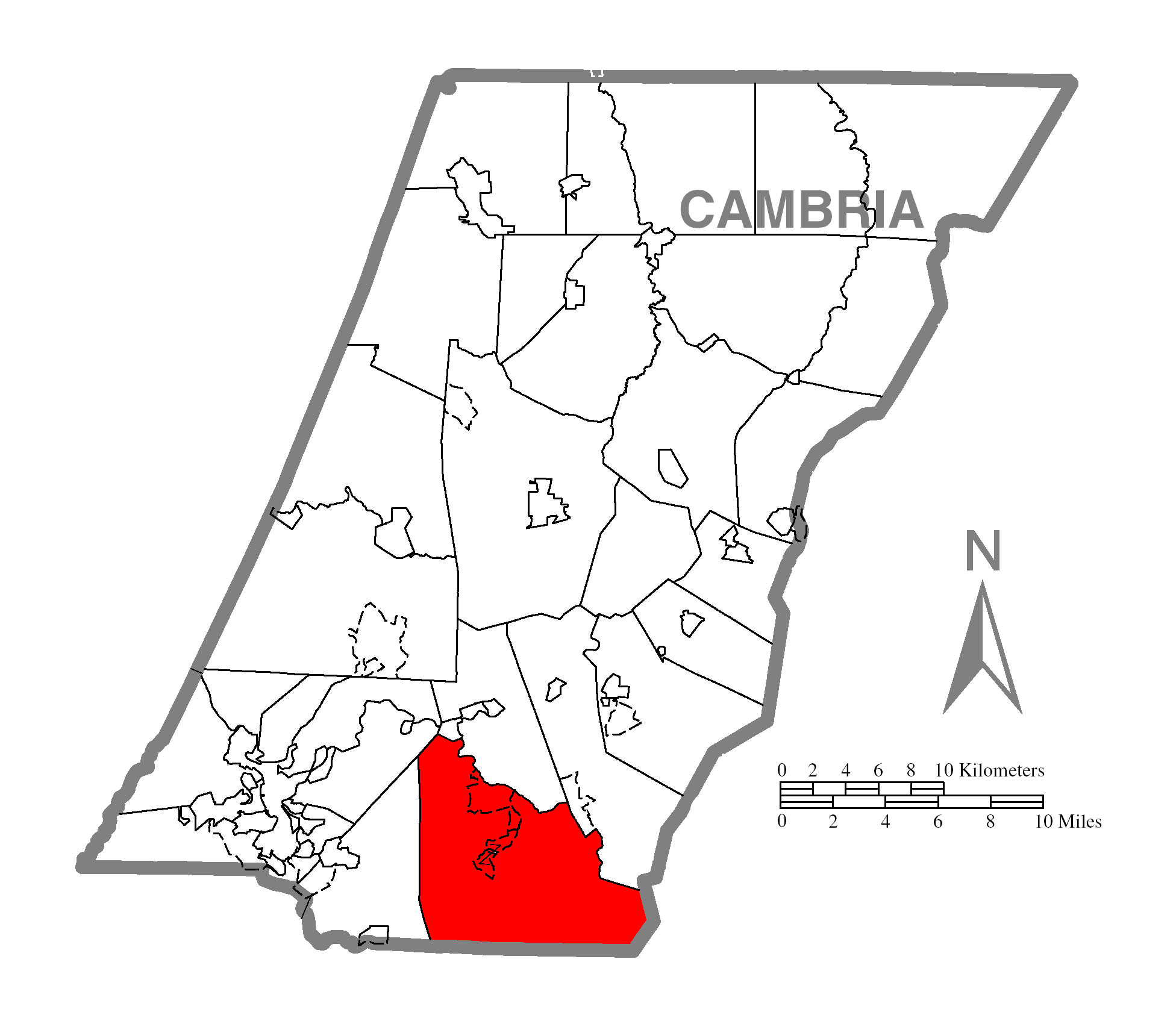
- ATMA serves a portion of Adams Township

The Adams Township Municipal Authority serves the Mine 42 area of the township with sewage treatment overseeing the conveyance line to the treatment plant that has a capacity of treating 15,000 gallons of waste water daily.

== See also ==
- List of municipal authorities in Cambria County, Pennsylvania
