= Joe Jones (tight end) =

American football player (born 1962)

No. 81
- Position: Tight end

Personal information
- Born: June 26, 1962 (age 64); Windber, Pennsylvania, U.S.
- Listed height: 6 ft 5 in (1.96 m)
- Listed weight: 255 lb (116 kg)

Career information
- High school: Forest Hills (Sidman, Pennsylvania)
- College: Virginia Tech
- NFL draft: 1985: 10th round, 270th overall pick

Career history
- Dallas Cowboys (1985)*; Buffalo Bills (1985)*; San Francisco 49ers (1986)*; Houston Oilers (1987)*; Minnesota Vikings (1987)*; Indianapolis Colts (1987); Pittsburgh Gladiators (1988)
- * Offseason or practice squad member only

Career NFL statistics
- Receptions: 3
- Receiving yards: 25
- Touchdowns: 1
- Stats at Pro Football Reference

Joseph Jones (born June 26, 1962) is an American former professional football player who was a tight end in the National Football League (NFL) for the Indianapolis Colts. He also was a member of the Pittsburgh Gladiators in the Arena Football League (AFL). He played college football for the Virginia Tech Hokies.

== Early life ==
Jones attended Forest Hills High School, where he practiced football, basketball and track.

He accepted a football scholarship from Virginia Tech. He began his college career as a backup tight end, playing mainly on special teams. As a sophomore, he had 3 receptions for 40 yards. As a senior, he became a starter at tight end, leading the team with 39 receptions for 452 yards and one touchdown. After this year he was a Second team All-South Independent (1984)

== Professional career ==
=== Dallas Cowboys ===
Jones was selected by the Dallas Cowboys in the 10th round (270th overall) of the 1985 NFL draft. He was waived in August.

=== Buffalo Bills ===
On August 15, 1985, he was signed as a free agent by the Buffalo Bills. He was cut on August 19.

=== San Francisco 49ers ===
In 1986, he was signed as a free agent by the San Francisco 49ers. He was released on August 7.

=== Houston Oilers ===
On January 6, 1987, he was signed as a free agent by the Houston Oilers. He was cut in August.

=== Minnesota Vikings ===
On August 10, 1987, he was signed by the Minnesota Vikings. He was released on August 31.

=== Indianapolis Colts ===
After the NFLPA strike was declared on the third week of the 1987 season, those contests were canceled (reducing the 16 game season to 15) and the NFL decided that the games would be played with replacement players. Jones was serving as a graduate assistant coach at Virginia Tech, when he was signed in September, to be a part of the Colts replacement team. He started 2 of 3 games at tight end, posting 3 receptions for 25 yards and one touchdown. He was cut on October 20, at the end of the strike.

=== Pittsburgh Gladiators ===
On May 6, 1988, he was signed by the Pittsburgh Gladiators of the Arena Football League. He was released on June 29.

== Personal life ==
Jones was a graduate assistant at Virginia Tech. He also was a football assistant at Poquoson High School and Suffolk High School. In 1989, he was named the football head coach at Windsor High School. In 1994, he was named the head football coach at Franklin High School.

In 1996, he was named the football head coach at Smithfield High School, until resigning at the end of the 2001 season. In 2008, he was named the football head coach at King's Fork High School. On February 7, 2016, he was named the football head coach at Ocean Lakes High School.
