= Wilmore, Pennsylvania =

Borough in Pennsylvania, US

- Borough
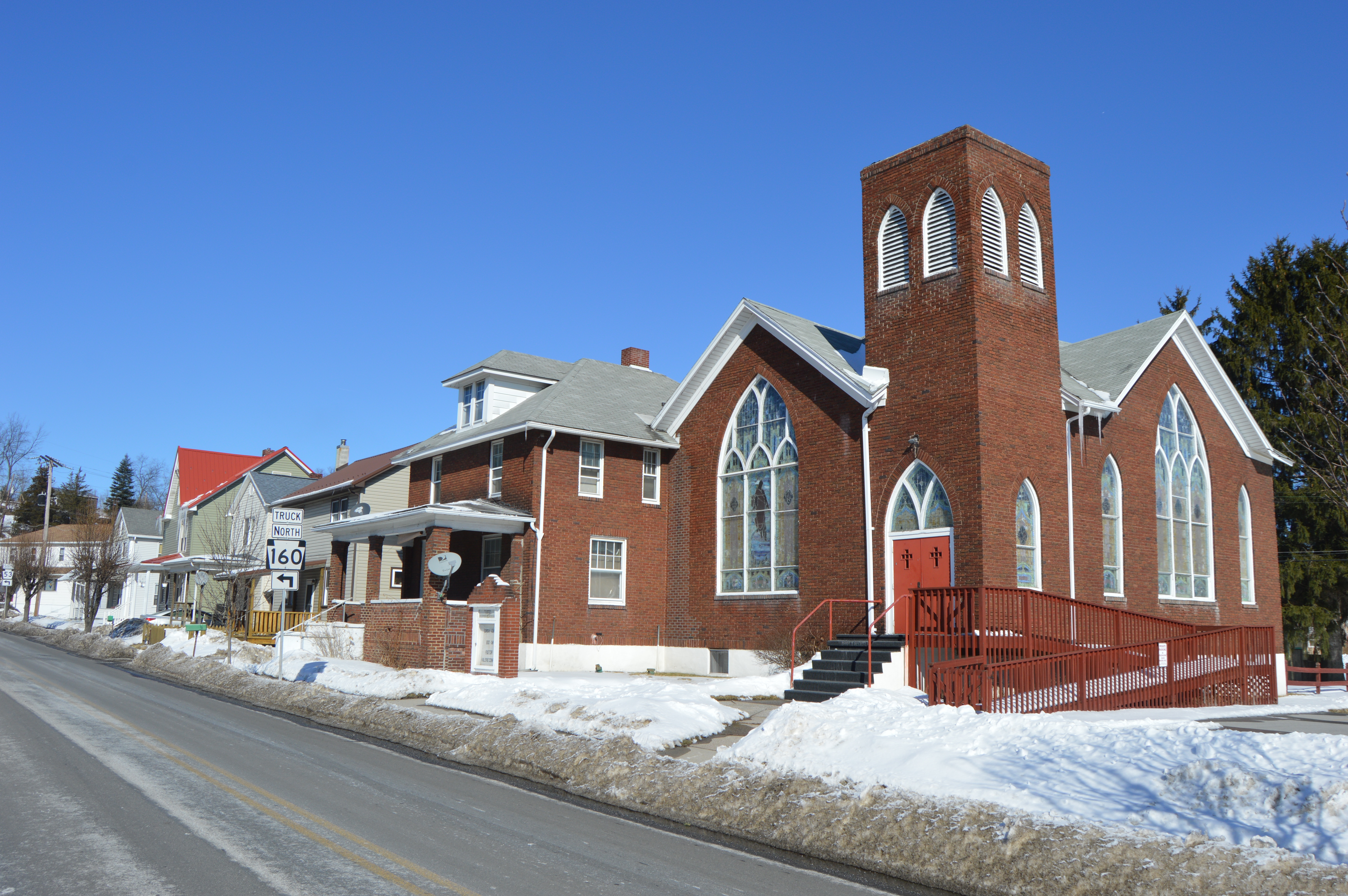
- Main Street

- Location of Wilmore in Cambria County, Pennsylvania.

- Location within Pennsylvania
- Coordinates: 40°23′14″N 78°43′05″W
- Country: United States
- State: Pennsylvania
- County: Cambria
- Settled: 1831
- Incorporated: 1859

Government
  - Type: Borough council

Area
  - Total: 0.33 sq mi (0.86 km^{2})
  - Land: 0.33 sq mi (0.86 km^{2})
  - Water: 0 sq mi (0.00 km^{2})
- Elevation: 1,555 ft (474 m)

Population (2010)
  - Total: 225
  - Estimate (2019): 205
  - Density: 618.1/sq mi (238.64/km^{2})
- Time zone: UTC-5 (Eastern (EST))
  - Summer (DST): UTC-4 (EDT)
- ZIP code: 15962
- Area code: 814
- FIPS code: 42-85528
- GNIS feature ID: 1215039

Wilmore is a borough in Cambria County, Pennsylvania, United States. It is part of the Johnstown, Pennsylvania Metropolitan Statistical Area. As of the 2020 census, Wilmore had a population of 206.

== Geography ==
Wilmore is located in south-central Cambria County in the valley of the Little Conemaugh River. It is 8 miles (13 km) south of Ebensburg, the county seat. Within the Little Conemaugh Valley, Portage is 3 miles (5 km) east (upstream), and Summerhill is 3 miles (5 km) to the west (downstream). Johnstown, the largest city in the county, is 16 miles (26 km) to the southwest.

According to the United States Census Bureau, the borough of Wilmore has a total area of 0.33 square miles (0.86 km^{2}), all land.

== Demographics ==
Historical population
Census	Pop.	Note	%±
1860	405		—
1870	393		−3.0%
1880	310		−21.1%
1890	350		12.9%
1900	264		−24.6%
1910	314		18.9%
1920	438		39.5%
1930	346		−21.0%
1940	410		18.5%
1950	390		−4.9%
1960	339		−13.1%
1970	386		13.9%
1980	299		−22.5%
1990	277		−7.4%
2000	252		−9.0%
2010	225		−10.7%
2020	206		−8.4%

As of the census of 2000, there were 252 people, 89 households, and 64 families residing in the borough. The population density was 745.7 inhabitants per square mile (287.9/km^{2}). There were 96 housing units at an average density of 284.1 per square mile (109.7/km^{2}). The racial makeup of the borough was 100.00% White.

There were 89 households, out of which 40.4% had children under the age of 18 living with them, 60.7% were married couples living together, 6.7% had a female householder with no husband present, and 27.0% were non-families. 23.6% of all households were made up of individuals, and 15.7% had someone living alone who was 65 years of age or older. The average household size was 2.83 and the average family size was 3.40.

In the borough the population was spread out, with 32.9% under the age of 18, 4.4% from 18 to 24, 29.0% from 25 to 44, 14.3% from 45 to 64, and 19.4% who were 65 years of age or older. The median age was 36 years. For every 100 females, there were 106.6 males. For every 100 females age 18 and over, there were 87.8 males.

The median income for a household in the borough was $31,719, and the median income for a family was $35,000. Males had a median income of $30,357 versus $17,813 for females. The per capita income for the borough was $12,075. About 4.8% of families and 9.4% of the population were below the poverty line, including 16.7% of those under the age of eighteen and 5.0% of those sixty five or over.

== History ==
In the book Underground Railroad in Pennsylvania, author William J. Switala makes reference to Wilmore being a part of the Johnstown-Wilmore-Ebensburg-Burnside route. "From Johnstown, the fugitive slaves moved northeasterly through the heavily wooded valleys and gullies of the Appalachian Mountains. The more well known of the two routes … proceeds from Johnstown all the way to Ebensburg, following the trace that eventually became US-219. Blockson mentions a stop along the route at the hamlet of Wilmore, a small black community located about eight miles south of Ebensburg and near Portage. Godfrey Wilmore, a former slave from Maryland, is reported to have founded the community."

Godfrey Wilmore was born 1751 in or near Cumberland, Allegheny County, Maryland [8] and died April 2, 1815, in Wilmore; he was buried at St. Michael's Cemetery, Loretto, Pennsylvania. Godfrey married Mary Higgins, who was born 1747 in Ireland and died August 28, 1822, in Wilmore; buried St. Michael's Cemetery, Loretto.

Godfrey was a freed slave of African descent. Mary was either an indentured servant or a redemptioner and was of Irish descent. Both his and Mary Higgins' servitude were documented within Harford County, Maryland. Godfrey is said to have been a man of above average intellect, who could read and write. This is referenced numerous times within Cambria County documents by the notation that Godfrey Wilmore wrote the document and witnessed it by his signature, whereas the other parties sign by their mark "X". In that he was a slave, the fact that he could read and write is remarkable and suggests that he may have been a "house slave" or a supervisory slave laborer. Even more remarkable is that it is further said that he was an energetic man who worked enough extra, outside of his servitude, that he was able to buy his freedom. Documents go on to say that he then bought the remaining time of indentured servitude of his white wife Mary Higgins. It is also noted that due to his education, Godfrey becomes the first teacher in the area that surrounds Wilmore.

According to the "Souvenir of St. Michael's Parish, Loretto, Pa." - On or about 1800 (?), this family traveled from Harford Co., Maryland, along the Conococheague Valley (pronounced by the early settlers "Con-eck e-jig"), westward through Cumberland, Maryland, and eventually coming to settle in a place then known as "Jimmy Rhey Place" (1909- John Mangus resides). This family was a charter pioneer in the formation of Summerhill Township (1810) and very likely a charter pioneer in the formation of Cambria County (1804). The family moved but once more, to a farm approx. 1 mile south of the town of Wilmore (1909- James H. White Farm). Godfrey built the first sawmill in this section of the county on the Little Conemaugh River, below the town of Wilmore, Pennsylvania. This water-driven sawmill was subsequently washed away and rebuilt about 800 yards east of the present (1910) Pennsylvania Railroad depot.

Mary (Higgins) Wilmore was a Catholic. Godfrey Wilmore, on the other hand, was a Baptist and well acquainted with the Sacred Scriptures. Father Demetrius Augustine Gallitzin, a Catholic priest, who was a former Russian prince, visited the Wilmore household with a view to reconciling the differences of religion within the family, and it was said that they had many earnest, controversial conversations, which eventually resulted in Godfrey's conversion to Catholicism.

In 1829, Sylvester Welch's Corps of Engineers was running the lines of the Allegheny Portage Railroad through Summerhill Township, and they came across "… a little village which they marked on their map 'Guinea', an appellation which the Irish laborers who built the road adopted until the matter was made a subject of complaint to Fr. Gallitzin, who from the altar denounced this insult to a family for whom he had the greatest respect. It was said that Father Gallitzin would chastise any person who would call the town by that opprobrious name and he declared that it should be known as Jefferson..." in honor of our third President. This is further referenced within the will of Bernard Wilmore, the oldest son of Godfrey and Mary Wilmore, that he lists the town of Jefferson as his home.

It was Bernard, with the help of his nephew Martin Wilmore (son of James and Catharine Wilmore) who laid out the town-site of then Guinea, changing the name, because of the promptings of Father Gallitzin, to Jefferson (June 4, 1831). On June 10, 1831, the contract was let for Section 15 of the Old Portage Railroad, which ran through Jefferson by the time of its completion in 1834.

Jefferson, as the name of the town, never caught on. The 6th post office in the county, established in Aug. 1832 along with the train depot, were forever referred to by the residents as "Wilmore's Post Office" and "Wilmore's Station" respectively. In 1859 the town was formally incorporated into a borough under the name of Wilmore and there were 20 homes.

Mary Wilmore, who was a daughter of Godfrey and Mary Wilmore, married James Young. He was educated, could read and write and was a contractor and the person who built St. Bartholomew's Church- the present-day Gothic structure in Wilmore which replaced the small stone church. St. Bartholomew's Church was built in 1854. Even though Bernard Wilmore at the time of his death (1844) had left a small parcel of land in the center of town to Father Gallitzin to be used as a church, Father Gallitzin's executors sold the property and it is currently where the Evangelical Lutheran Church now stands.

== Education ==
It is in the Forest Hills School District.
