= University of Pittsburgh (Johnstown), Pennsylvania =

Coordinates: 40.266349°N 78.840140°W

- CDP
- Interactive map of University of Pittsburgh (Johnstown), Pennsylvania
- Country: United States
- State: Pennsylvania
- County: Cambria

Population (2010)
  - Total: 1,572
- Time zone: UTC-5 (Eastern (EST))
  - Summer (DST): UTC-4 (EDT)

University of Pittsburgh (Johnstown) (CDP) is a census-designated place in Richland Township, Cambria County, Pennsylvania, United States. It is located just off campus to University of Pittsburgh at Johnstown, approximately four miles east of the city of Johnstown. As of the 2010 census, the population was 1,572 residents.
