= Salix, Pennsylvania =

Unincorporated community in Pennsylvania, US

- Census-designated place
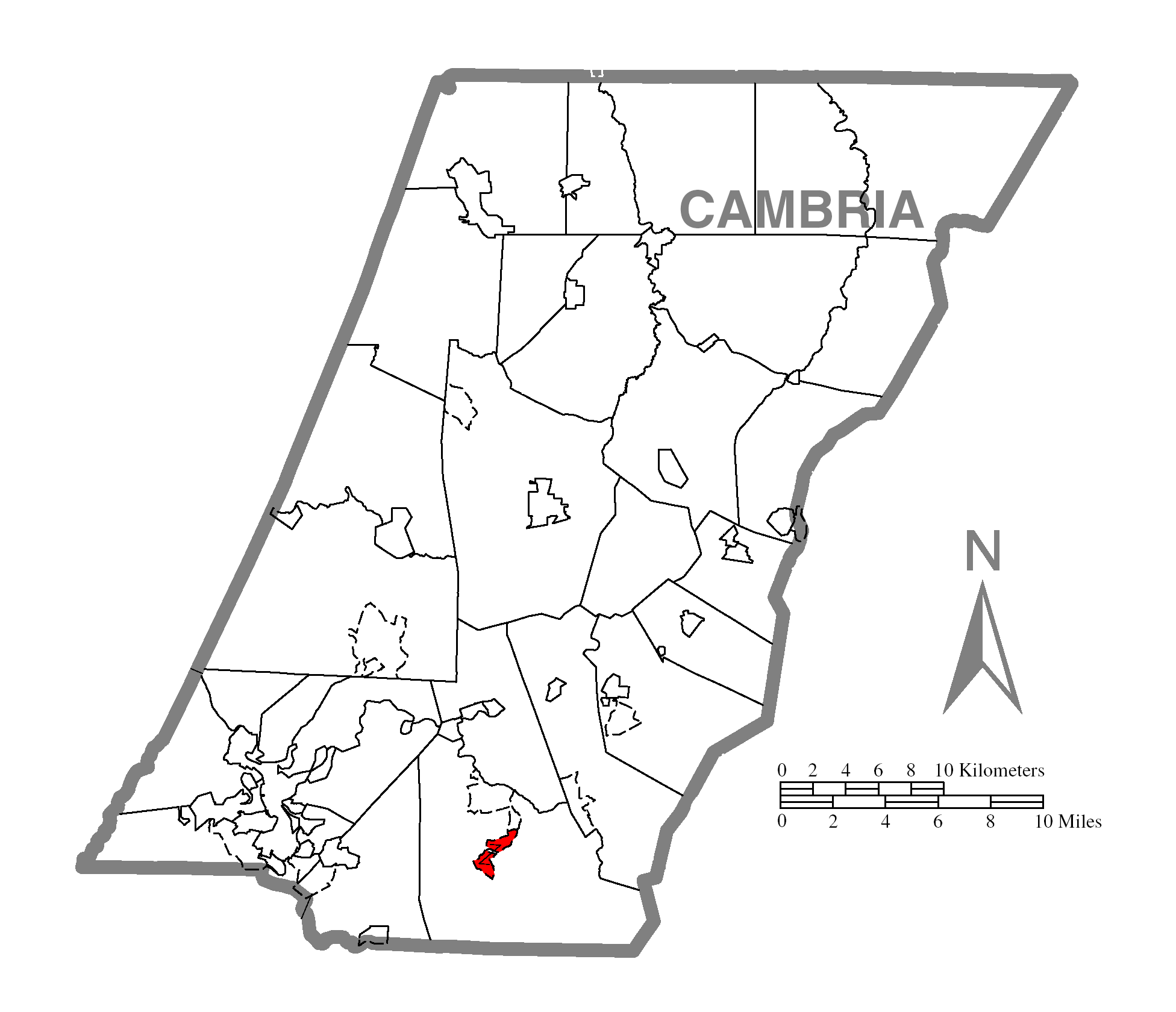
- Location within Cambria County

- Location within the U.S. state of Pennsylvania Salix (the United States)
- Coordinates: 40°17′54″N 78°45′43″W
- Country: United States
- State: Pennsylvania
- County: Cambria
- Township: Adams

Area
  - Total: 1.07 sq mi (2.76 km^{2})
  - Land: 1.07 sq mi (2.76 km^{2})
  - Water: 0 sq mi (0.00 km^{2})
- Elevation: 2,051 ft (625 m)

Population (2020)
  - Total: 1,043
  - Density: 978.4/sq mi (377.76/km^{2})
- Time zone: UTC-5 (Eastern (EST))
  - Summer (DST): UTC-4 (EDT)
- ZIP code: 15952
- FIPS code: 42-67608
- GNIS feature ID: 1186872

Salix is an unincorporated community and census-designated place (CDP) in Adams Township, Cambria County, Pennsylvania in Cambria County, Pennsylvania, United States. The population was 1,149 at the 2010 census. In previous censuses it was listed as Salix-Beauty Line Park.

== Geography ==
Salix is located in southeastern Cambria County at 40°17′54″N 78°45′43″W (40.298358, -78.761987), near the geographic center of Adams Township. It is 11 miles (18 km) east of Johnstown.

According to the United States Census Bureau, the CDP has a total area of 0.97 square miles (2.51 km^{2}), all of it land.

== Demographics ==
Historical population
Census	Pop.	Note	%±
2020	1,043		—
U.S. Decennial Census

As of the census of 2000, there were 1,259 people, 469 households, and 377 families residing in the CDP. The population density was 1,298.3 inhabitants per square mile (501.3/km^{2}). There were 483 housing units at an average density of 498.1 per square mile (192.3/km^{2}). The racial makeup of the CDP was 98.17% White, 0.48% Native American, 0.24% Asian, 0.48% from other races, and 0.64% from two or more races. Hispanic or Latino of any race were 1.19% of the population.

Ancestries: German (32.1%), English (11.3%), United States (9.6%), Irish (8.8%), Arab (8.3%), Polish (5.6%).

There were 469 households, out of which 38.4% had children under the age of 18 living with them, 67.4% were married couples living together, 10.9% had a female householder with no husband present, and 19.6% were non-families. 17.7% of all households were made up of individuals, and 4.9% had someone living alone who was 65 years of age or older. The average household size was 2.68 and the average family size was 3.04.

In the CDP, the population was spread out, with 26.3% under the age of 18, 8.2% from 18 to 24, 29.5% from 25 to 44, 28.0% from 45 to 64, and 8.1% who were 65 years of age or older. The median age was 36 years. For every 100 females, there were 92.8 males. For every 100 females age 18 and over, there were 89.4 males.

The median income for a household in the CDP was $44,191, and the median income for a family was $43,971. Males had a median income of $34,044 versus $22,209 for females. The per capita income for the CDP was $18,684. About 7.0% of families and 6.9% of the population were below the poverty line, including 12.6% of those under age 18 and 11.0% of those age 65 or over.

== Education ==
It is in the Forest Hills School District.
