= Saint Benedict, Pennsylvania =

Unincorporated community in Pennsylvania, US

- Unincorporated community
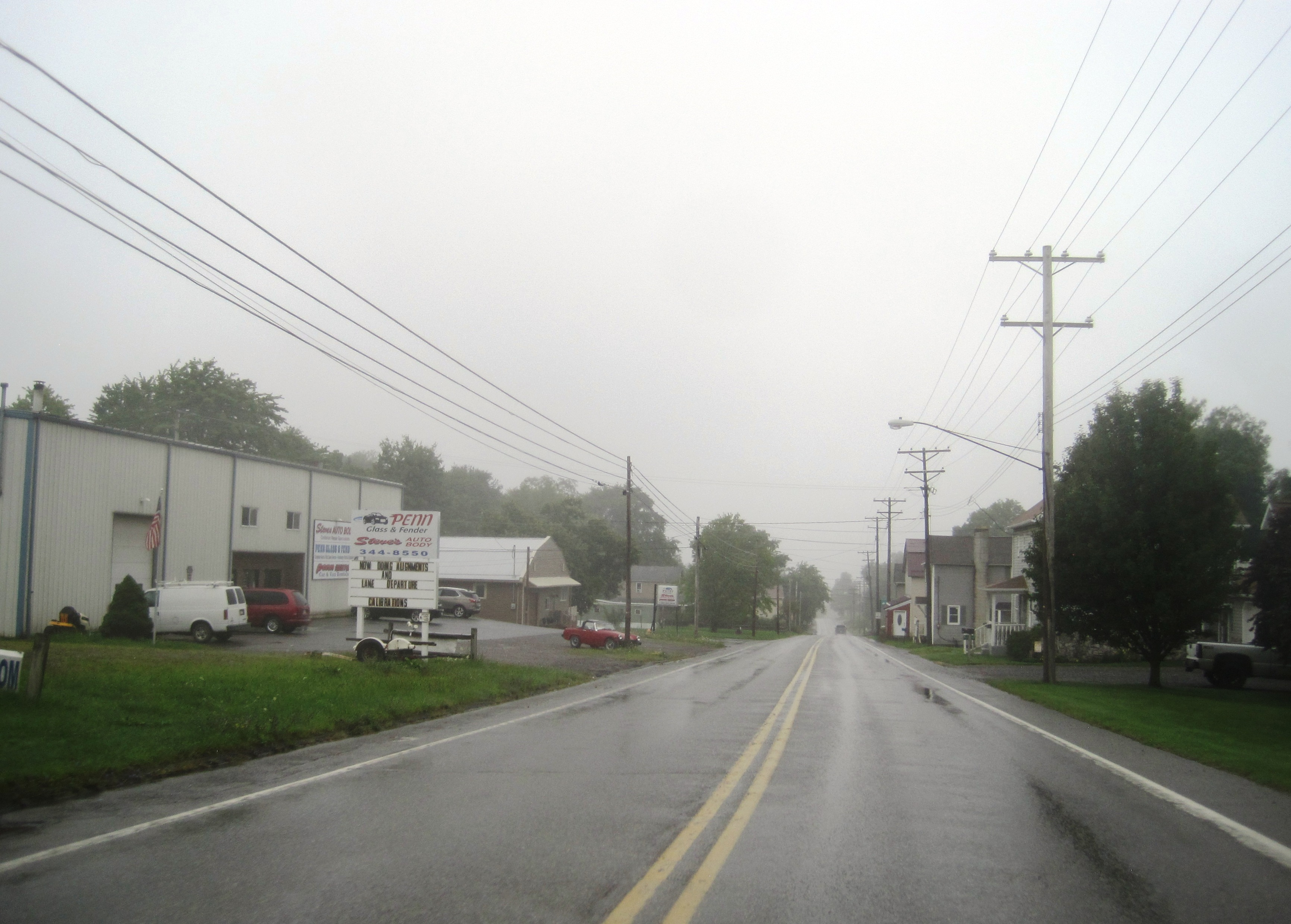
- US 219 northbound in Saint Benedict

- Location within Pennsylvania
- Coordinates: 40°37′39″N 78°43′46″W
- Country: United States
- State: Pennsylvania
- County: Cambria
- Township: West Carroll
- Elevation: 1,834 ft (559 m)
- Time zone: UTC-5 (Eastern (EST))
  - Summer (DST): UTC-4 (EDT)
- ZIP code: 15773
- Area code: 814
- GNIS feature ID: 1185819

Saint Benedict is an unincorporated community in Cambria County, Pennsylvania, United States. The community is located along U.S. Route 219, 3.5 miles (5.6 km) southeast of Northern Cambria. Saint Benedict has a post office, with ZIP code 15773.

== Demographics ==
Historical population
Census	Pop.	Note	%±

The United States Census Bureau defined Saint Benedict as a census designated place (CDP) in 2023.
