= Summerhill Township, Cambria County, Pennsylvania =

Township in Pennsylvania, US

Coordinates: 40°25′13″N 78°41′59″W

- Township
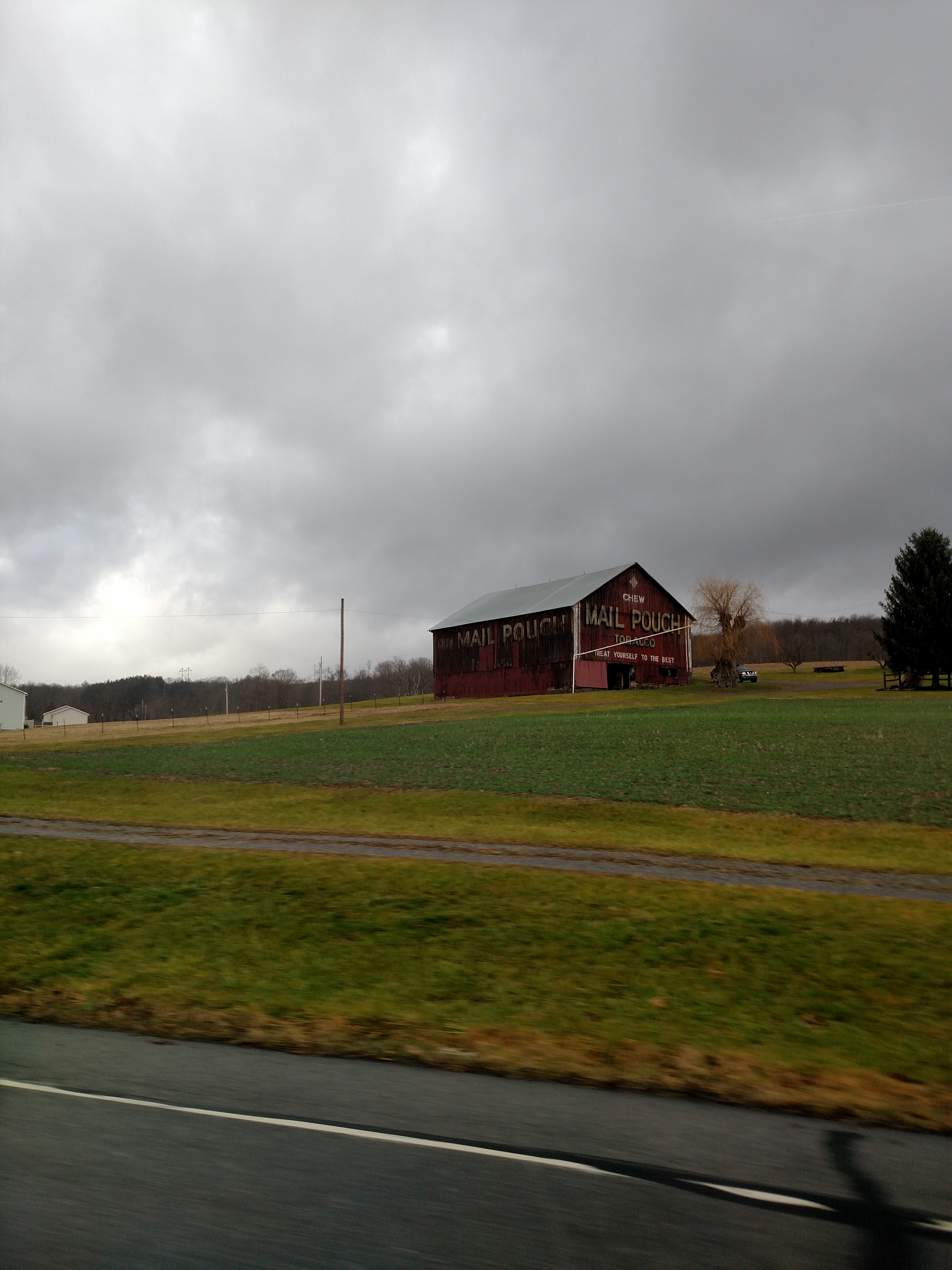
- Mail Pouch Tobacco barn along PA 53

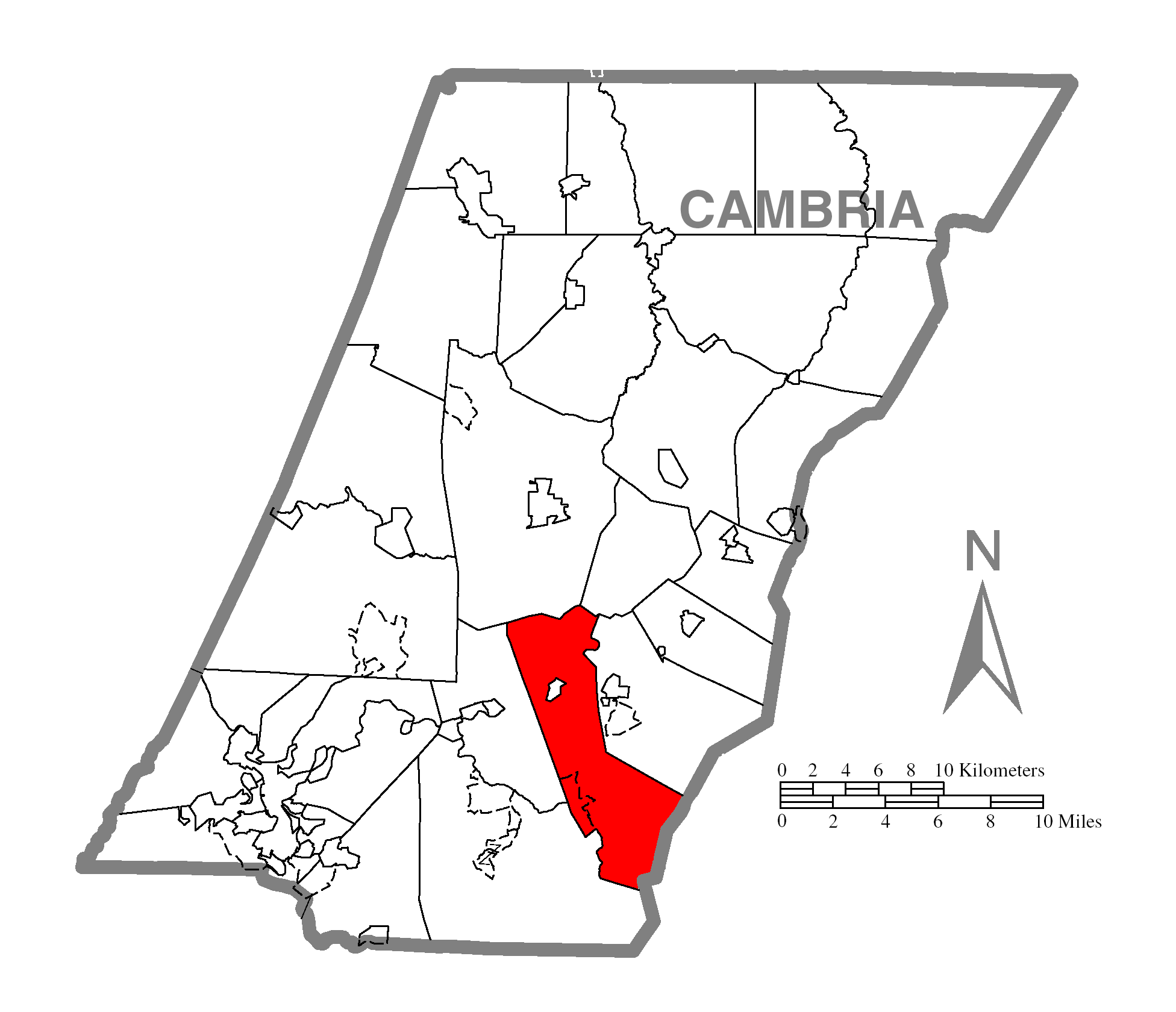
- Map of Cambria County, Pennsylvania highlighting Summerhill Township

- Map of Cambria County, Pennsylvania
- Country: United States
- State: Pennsylvania
- County: Cambria
- Settled: 1792
- Incorporated: 1810

Area
  - Total: 29.58 sq mi (76.61 km^{2})
  - Land: 28.90 sq mi (74.86 km^{2})
  - Water: 0.68 sq mi (1.75 km^{2})

Population (2010)
  - Total: 2,467
  - Estimate (2016): 2,341
  - Density: 81.0/sq mi (31.27/km^{2})
- Time zone: UTC-5 (Eastern (EST))
  - Summer (DST): UTC-4 (EDT)
- Area code: 814
- FIPS code: 42-021-75144
- Website: www.summerhilltwp.com

Summerhill Township is a township in Cambria County, Pennsylvania, United States. The population was 2,467 at the 2010 census. It is part of the Johnstown, Pennsylvania Metropolitan Statistical Area.

== Geography ==
The township is located in southeastern Cambria County and is bordered at its southeastern end by Bedford County. The borough of Wilmore is surrounded by the northern part of the township. The unincorporated community of Beaverdale is along the southwestern border of the township. Johnstown is 16 miles (26 km) to the southwest, and Ebensburg, the Cambria County seat, is 8 miles (13 km) to the north.

According to the United States Census Bureau, the township has a total area of 29.6 square miles (76.6 km^{2}), of which 28.9 square miles (74.9 km^{2}) is land and 0.69 square miles (1.8 km^{2}), or 2.29%, is water. The Little Conemaugh River flows westward across the northern portion of the township. Beaverdam Run Reservoir is in the southeastern part of the township. The crest of the Allegheny Front, the height of land between the Susquehanna River watershed to the east and the Ohio River basin to the west, approximately follows the Bedford County line along the southeastern edge of the township.

== Communities ==
=== Census-designated places ===
Census-designated places are geographical areas designated by the U.S. Census Bureau for the purposes of compiling demographic data. They are not actual jurisdictions under Pennsylvania law. Other unincorporated communities, such as villages, may be listed here as well.

- Beaverdale

=== Unincorporated communities ===
- LLoydell
- Onnalinda

== Recreation ==
A portion of the Pennsylvania State Game Lands Number 26 is located in the southeastern part of the township to the south and east of the Beaverdam Run Reservoir.

== Demographics ==
Historical population
Census	Pop.	Note	%±
2000	2,724		—
2010	2,467		−9.4%
2016 (est.)	2,341		−5.1%
U.S. Decennial Census

As of the census of 2000, there were 2,724 people, 1,009 households, and 747 families residing in the township. The population density was 94.3 inhabitants per square mile (36.4/km^{2}). There were 1,097 housing units at an average density of 38.0 per square mile (14.7/km^{2}). The racial makeup of the township was 99.56% White, 0.07% African American, 0.04% Native American, and 0.33% from two or more races. Hispanic or Latino of any race were 0.04% of the population.

There were 1,009 households, out of which 34.9% had children under the age of 18 living with them, 59.4% were married couples living together, 10.0% had a female householder with no husband present, and 25.9% were non-families. 23.8% of all households were made up of individuals, and 13.3% had someone living alone who was 65 years of age or older. The average household size was 2.69 and the average family size was 3.19.

In the township the population was spread out, with 26.9% under the age of 18, 7.8% from 18 to 24, 27.7% from 25 to 44, 23.3% from 45 to 64, and 14.2% who were 65 years of age or older. The median age was 37 years. For every 100 females, there were 96.3 males. For every 100 females age 18 and over, there were 93.5 males.

The median income for a household in the township was $29,950, and the median income for a family was $35,938. Males had a median income of $27,500 versus $18,984 for females. The per capita income for the township was $14,242. About 9.2% of families and 11.5% of the population were below the poverty line, including 15.2% of those under age 18 and 6.2% of those age 65 or over.
