= Ehrenfeld, Pennsylvania =

Borough in Pennsylvania, US

- Borough
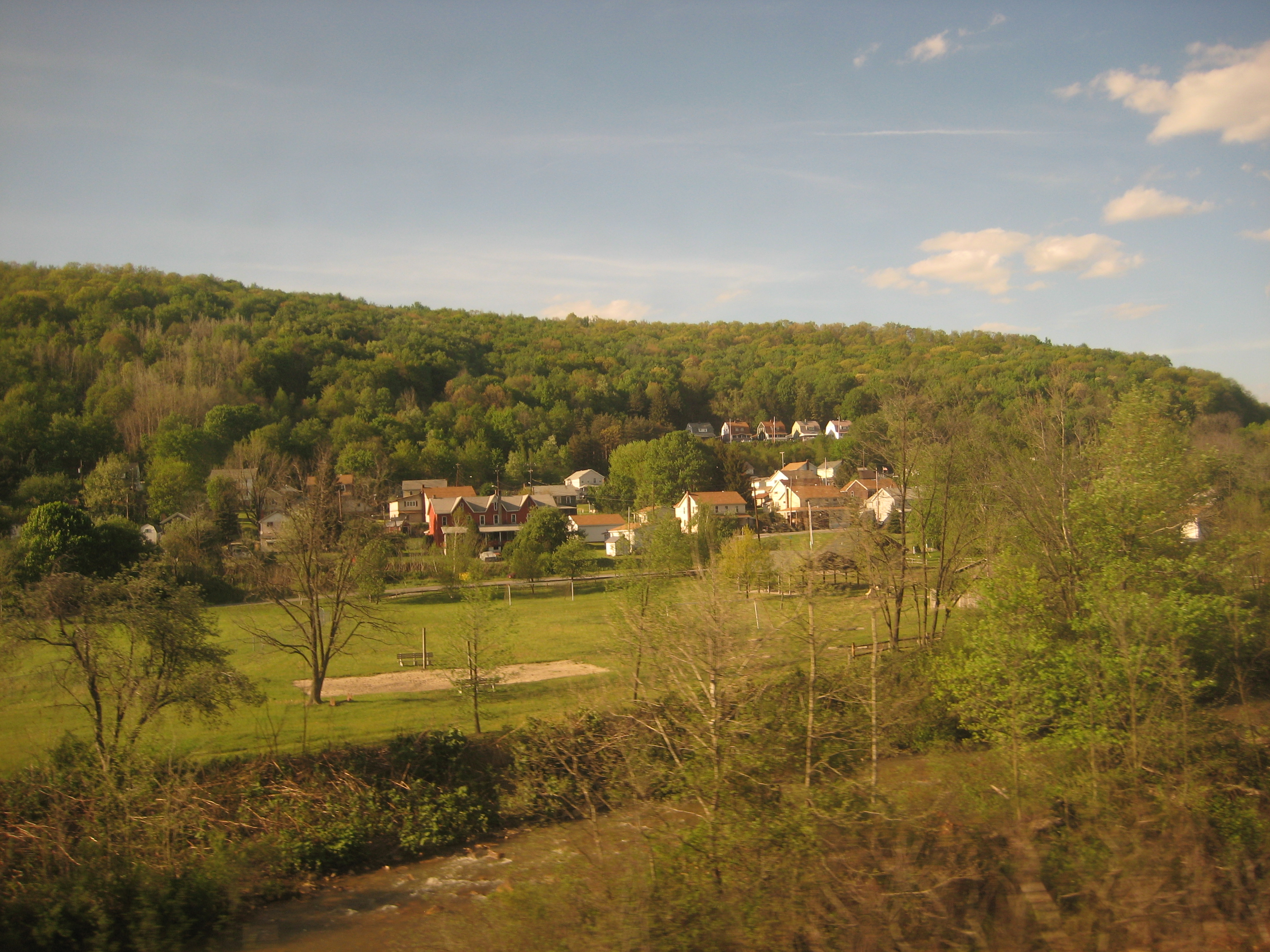
- Ehrenfeld from a passing Pennsylvanian train

- Location of Ehrenfeld in Cambria County, Pennsylvania.

- Location within Pennsylvania
- Coordinates: 40°22′20″N 78°46′35″W
- Country: United States
- State: Pennsylvania
- County: Cambria
- Incorporated: 1956

Government
  - Type: Borough council

Area
  - Total: 0.44 sq mi (1.15 km^{2})
  - Land: 0.43 sq mi (1.12 km^{2})
  - Water: 0.015 sq mi (0.04 km^{2})
- Elevation: 1,683 ft (513 m)

Population (2020)
  - Total: 203
  - Density: 471.2/sq mi (181.95/km^{2})
- Time zone: UTC-5 (Eastern (EST))
  - Summer (DST): UTC-4 (EDT)
- ZIP code: 15956
- Area code: 814
- FIPS code: 42-22712
- GNIS feature ID: 1215019

Ehrenfeld (German: "Field of Honor") is a borough in Cambria County, Pennsylvania, United States. It is part of the Johnstown, Pennsylvania Metropolitan Statistical Area. As of the 2020 census, Ehrenfeld had a population of 203. It once was nicknamed "Scooptown". There is also Ehrenfeld and Neuehrenfeld (New-Ehrenfeld) a district of Cologne, Germany.

== Geography ==
Ehrenfeld is located in south-central Cambria County at 40°22′20″N 78°46′35″W (40.372273, -78.776394), in the valley of the Little Conemaugh River. It is bordered to the east by the borough of Summerhill and to the southwest by the borough of South Fork. U.S. Route 219 passes through the eastern part of Ehrenfeld, with access from one exit (Pennsylvania Route 53). US 219 leads north 10 miles (16 km) to Ebensburg, the county seat, and southwest 33 miles (53 km) to Somerset. Johnstown, the largest city in Cambria County, is 13 miles (21 km) to the southwest via US 219 and Pennsylvania Route 56.

According to the United States Census Bureau, the borough of Ehrenfeld has a total area of 0.44 square miles (1.15 km^{2}), of which 0.43 square miles (1.12 km^{2}) is land and 0.01 square miles (0.03 km^{2}), or 2.98%, is water.

== Demographics ==
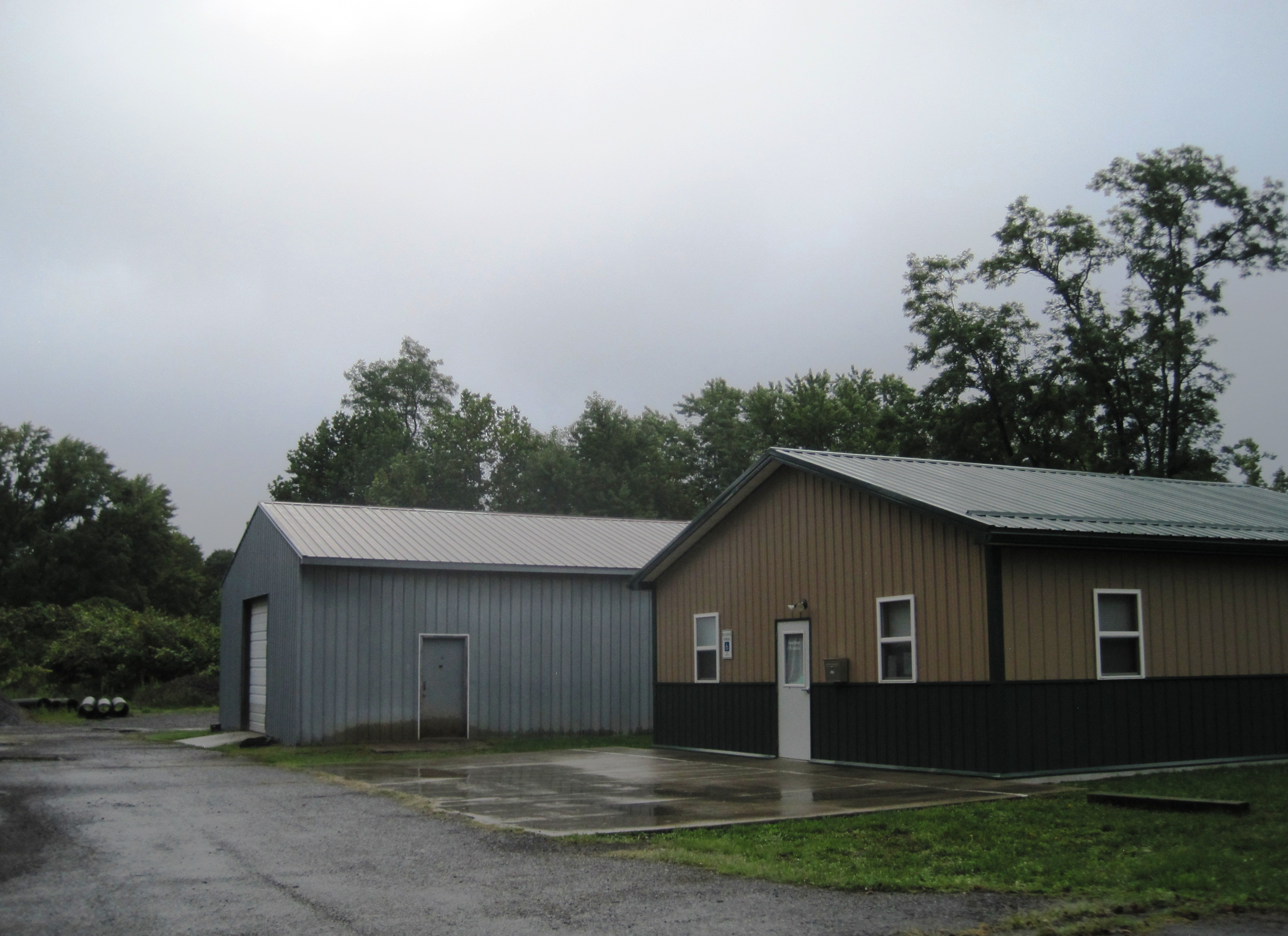
Ehrenfeld Borough Hall

Historical population
Census	Pop.	Note	%±
1890	567		—
1960	566		—
1970	397		−29.9%
1980	360		−9.3%
1990	307		−14.7%
2000	234		−23.8%
2010	228		−2.6%
2020	203		−11.0%

As of 2021, there were 184 people in the borough. The racial makeup of the borough was 100.00% White.

== History ==
In 1901, General Electric Company built the first alternating current power plant at Ehrenfeld. The plant, designed to eliminate the difficulties in long-distance direct current transmission, was built for the Webster Coal and Coke Company.

== Education ==
It is in the Forest Hills School District.

== Notable person ==
Actor Charles Bronson was born and raised in Ehrenfeld.
