= Forest Hills School District =

School district in Pennsylvania

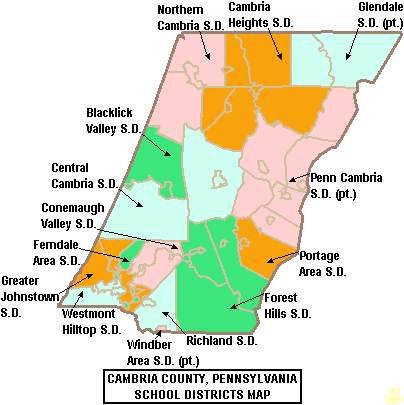

Address
- 549 Locust Street Sidman, Cambria County, Pennsylvania, 15955; United States
- Coordinates: Latitude: 40.339530 / N 40° 20' 22.308" Longitude: -78.758945 / W 78° 45' 32.2"

District information
- Type: Public

Students and staff
- Colors: Green and gold

Other information
- Website: www.fhrangers.org

Forest Hills School District is a small rural public school district in Cambria County, Pennsylvania, United States. It serves the boroughs of Wilmore, Summerhill, South Fork, and Ehrenfeld, plus the townships of Adams, Summerhill, and Croyle. The Forest Hills School District encompasses approximately 96 square miles (250 km^{2}).

== History ==
According to 2000 US Census Bureau data, it served a resident population of 13,597 people. By 2010, the district's population declined to 12,641 people. The educational attainment levels for the Forest Hills School District population (25 years old and over) were 88.7% high school graduates and 16.1% college graduates. The district is one of the 500 public school districts of Pennsylvania. The district operates 2 schools, providing kindergarten (5 years old) through 12th grade. Since 2009, the district has provided taxpayer funded preschool to 4-year-olds.

According to the Pennsylvania Budget and Policy Center, 44.8% of the district's pupils lived at 185% or below the Federal Poverty level, as shown by their eligibility for the federal free or reduced price school meal programs in 2012. In 2010, the district residents’ per capita income was $14,904, while the median family income was $37,099. In the Commonwealth, the median family income was $49,501 and the United States median family income was $49,445, in 2010. In Cambria County, the median household income was $39,574. By 2013, the median household income in the United States rose to $52,100.

== Schools ==
- Forest Hills Junior-Senior High School, 7th to 12th grade, 549 Locust Street in Sidman
- Forest Hills Elementary School, Preschool to 6th grade, 547 Locust Street in Sidman

High school students may choose to attend Greater Johnstown Career and Technology Center for training in the construction and mechanical trades, as well as other careers. The Appalachia Intermediate Unit IU8 provides the district with a wide variety of services like specialized education for disabled students and hearing, background checks for employees, state mandated recognizing and reporting child abuse training, speech and visual disability services and professional development for staff and faculty.

== Extracurriculars ==
Forest Hills School District offers a wide variety of clubs, activities and an extensive, publicly funded sports program.

=== Sports ===
The district funds:

Varsity

Boys

- Baseball – AA
- Basketball – AAA
- Cross country – AA
- Football – AA
- Golf – AA
- Rifle – AAAA
- Soccer – AA
- Tennis – AA
- Track and field – AA
- Volleyball – AA
- Wrestling – AA

Girls

- Basketball – AAA
- Cross country – AA
- Golf – AA
- Rifle – AAAA
- Soccer (Fall) – AA
- Softball – AA
- Tennis – AA
- Track and field – AA
- Volleyball – AA
- Cheerleading-AA

According to PIAA directory, July 2015
