= Summerhill, Pennsylvania =

Borough in Pennsylvania, US

- Borough
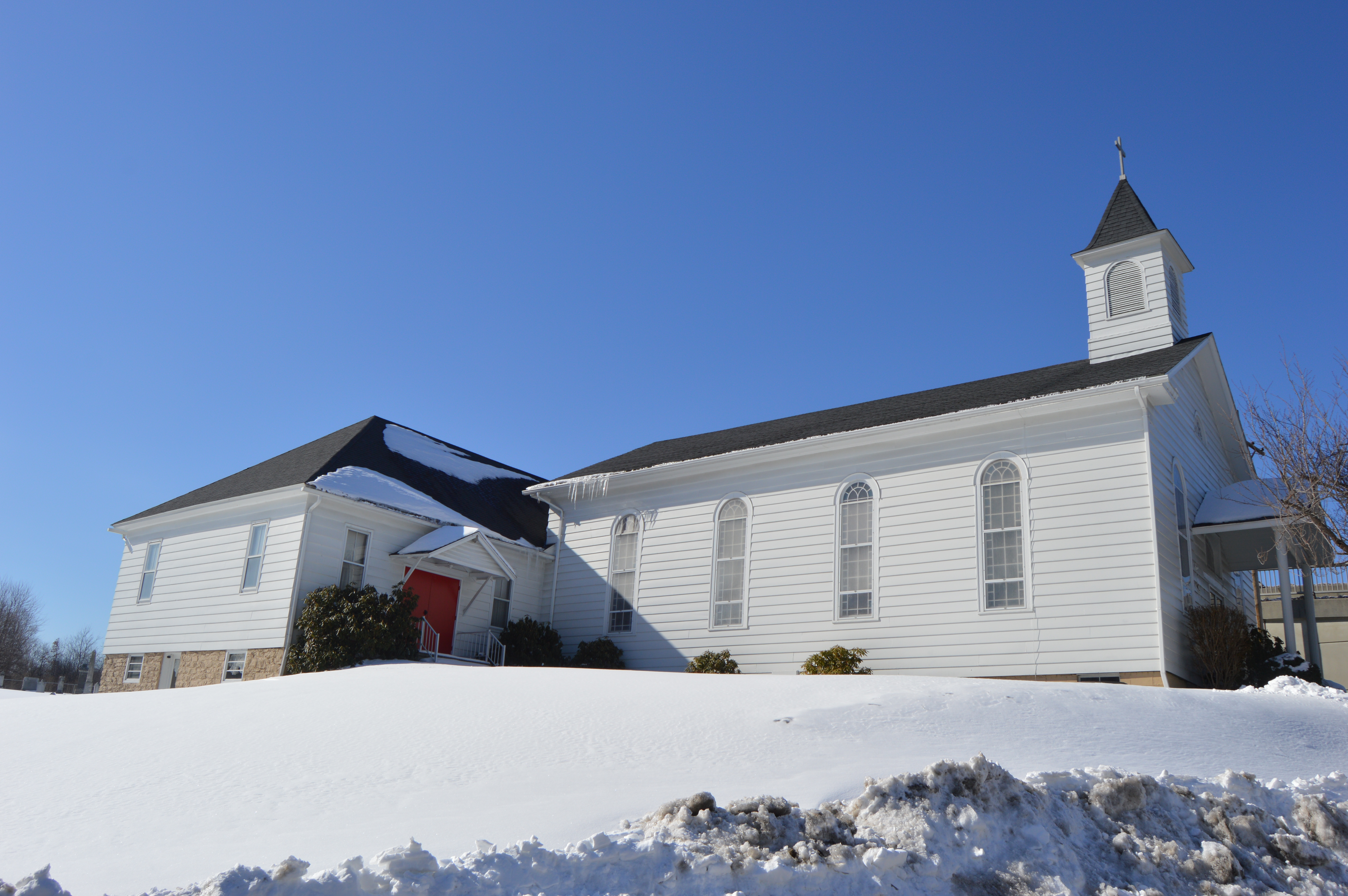
- St. John's Lutheran Church in Summerhill

- Location of Summerhill in Cambria County, Pennsylvania

- Location within Pennsylvania
- Coordinates: 40°22′32″N 78°45′38″W
- Country: United States
- State: Pennsylvania
- County: Cambria
- Settled: 1810
- Incorporated: 1892

Government
  - Type: Borough council

Area
  - Total: 0.33 sq mi (0.86 km^{2})
  - Land: 0.33 sq mi (0.85 km^{2})
  - Water: 0.0039 sq mi (0.01 km^{2})
- Elevation: 1,588 ft (484 m)

Population (2010)
  - Total: 490
  - Estimate (2019): 444
  - Density: 1,354.0/sq mi (522.79/km^{2})
- Time zone: UTC-5 (Eastern (EST))
  - Summer (DST): UTC-4 (EDT)
- ZIP Code: 15958
- Area code: 814
- FIPS code: 42-75136
- GNIS feature ID: 2086657
- Website: http://www.summerhillboro.com/

Summerhill is a borough in Cambria County, Pennsylvania, United States. As of the 2020 census, Summerhill had a population of 479.

== History ==
A small borough in the Allegheny Mountains in southwestern Pennsylvania, Summerhill was settled in the early 19th century and grew in large part from the regional presence of Allegheny Portage Railroad and the Pennsylvania Railroad.

In 1794, Thomas and Barbara Croyle and their family were among the first to settle in the town. Their family homestead, a two-story stone structure that still stands, served the family as a fortress against Indian attacks. According to some sources, Indians burned the Croyles' cabin and property, causing the family to seek refuge at Fort Bedford. By 1800, Barbara Croyle chose to rebuild their homestead with stone; she limited windows to two sides of the house to keep it stronger if attacked.

The Croyle family built a grist mill, known locally as Croyle's Mill, and a dam on the Little Conemaugh River to operate it. The establishment of the mill was significant enough for the county to notice and fund its first public works project, a dirt road from Ebensburg to Croyle's Mill. The mill operated into the 1900s.

In February 1810, Summerhill Township was devolved from larger Conemaugh Township, one of three original townships established in Cambria County. Originally spelled "Somerhill", the township was likely named for Joseph and David Somers, some of its early, chief landowners.

In the 1820s, Summerhill Township covered a large swath of land in the north-central part of the current county, including present-day Jackson, Munster, Washington, Portage and Blacklick townships. The existing borough took its name from Summerhill Township and was then known as Summer Hill. Records from 1926 indicate the borough's current spelling, Summerhill.

== Geography ==
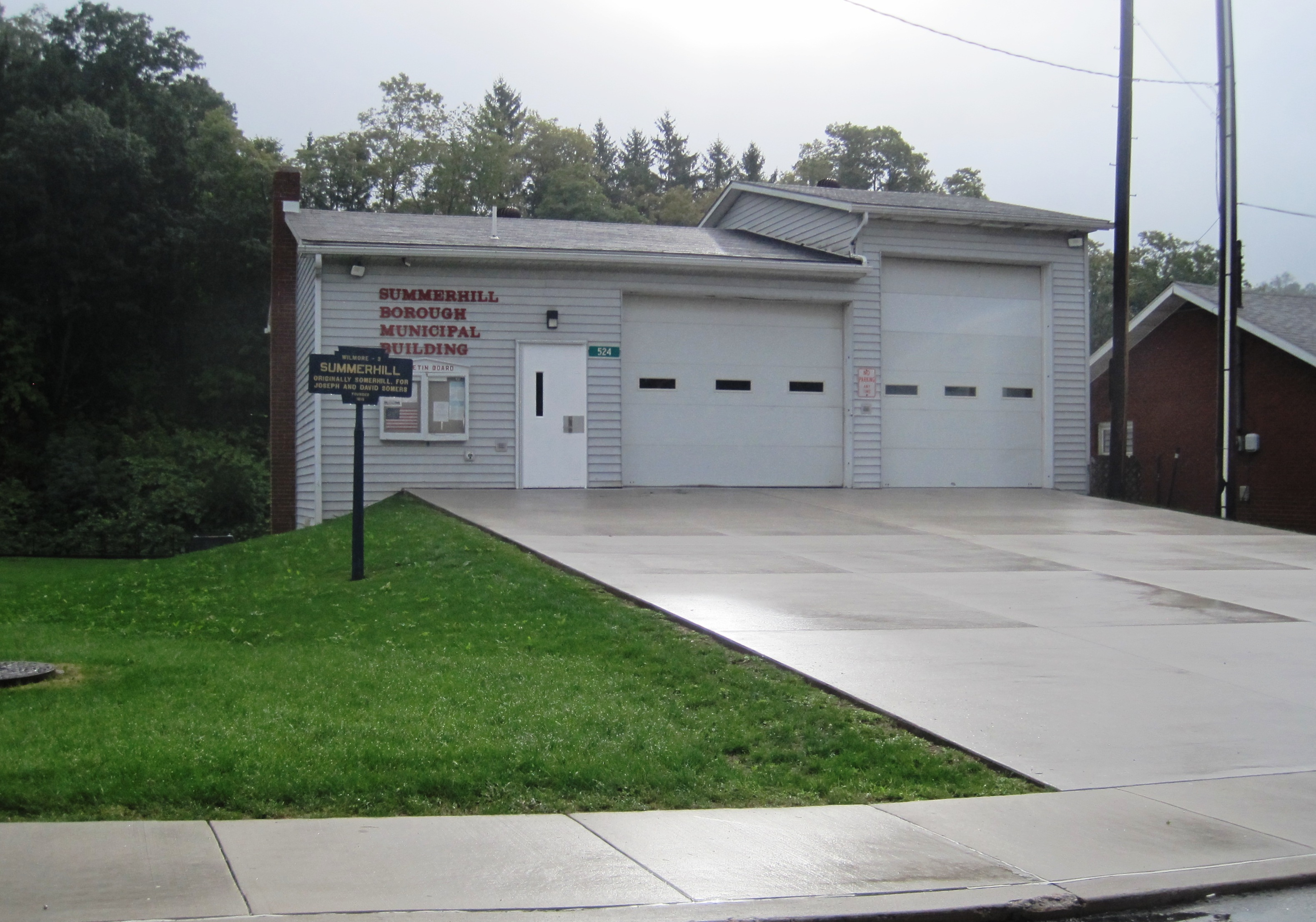
Summerhill Borough Hall

Summerhill is located in south-central Cambria County at 40°22′32″N 78°45′38″W (40.375424, -78.760623) in the Laurel Highlands of the Allegheny Mountains. The north branch of the Little Conemaugh River and Laurel Run, tributaries of the Conemaugh River, run through the community. Summerhill is bordered on the west by the borough of Ehrenfeld.

U.S. Route 219, a four-lane expressway, runs through the northwestern part of the borough, with access from an interchange with Pennsylvania Route 53 southwest of the borough limits. US 219 leads north 10 miles (16 km) to Ebensburg, the county seat. Johnstown is 14 miles (23 km) to the southwest via US 219 and Pennsylvania Route 56.

According to the U.S. Census Bureau, Summerhill borough has a total area of 0.33 square miles (0.86 km^{2}), of which 0.33 square miles (0.85 km^{2}) is land and 0.004 square miles (0.01 km^{2}), or 1.53%, is water.

== Demographics ==
Historical population
Census	Pop.	Note	%±
1880	343		—
1900	591		—
1910	863		46.0%
1920	890		3.1%
1930	785		−11.8%
1940	861		9.7%
1950	849		−1.4%
1960	870		2.5%
1970	726		−16.6%
1980	725		−0.1%
1990	614		−15.3%
2000	521		−15.1%
2010	490		−6.0%
2020	479		−2.2%

As of the census of 2000, there were 521 people, 220 households, and 146 families residing in the borough. The population density was 1,647.5 inhabitants per square mile (636.1/km^{2}). There were 227 housing units at an average density of 717.8 per square mile (277.1/km^{2}). The racial makeup of the borough was 99.81% White and 0.19% Asian. Hispanic or Latino of any race were 0.58% of the population.

There were 220 households, out of which 27.7% had children under the age of 18 living with them, 55.5% were married couples living together, 10.9% had a female householder with no husband present, and 33.2% were non-families. 32.7% of all households were made up of individuals, and 20.5% had someone living alone who was 65 years of age or older. The average household size was 2.36 and the average family size was 3.00.

In the borough, the population was spread out, with 25.7% under the age of 18, 8.3% from 18 to 24, 25.1% from 25 to 44, 20.3% from 45 to 64, and 20.5% who were 65 years of age or older. The median age was 38 years. For every 100 females there were 86.1 males. For every 100 females age 18 and over, there were 76.7 males.

== Education ==
It is in the Forest Hills School District.
