= Adams Township, Cambria County, Pennsylvania =

Township in Pennsylvania, US

Coordinates: 40°14′45″N 78°42′29″W

- Township
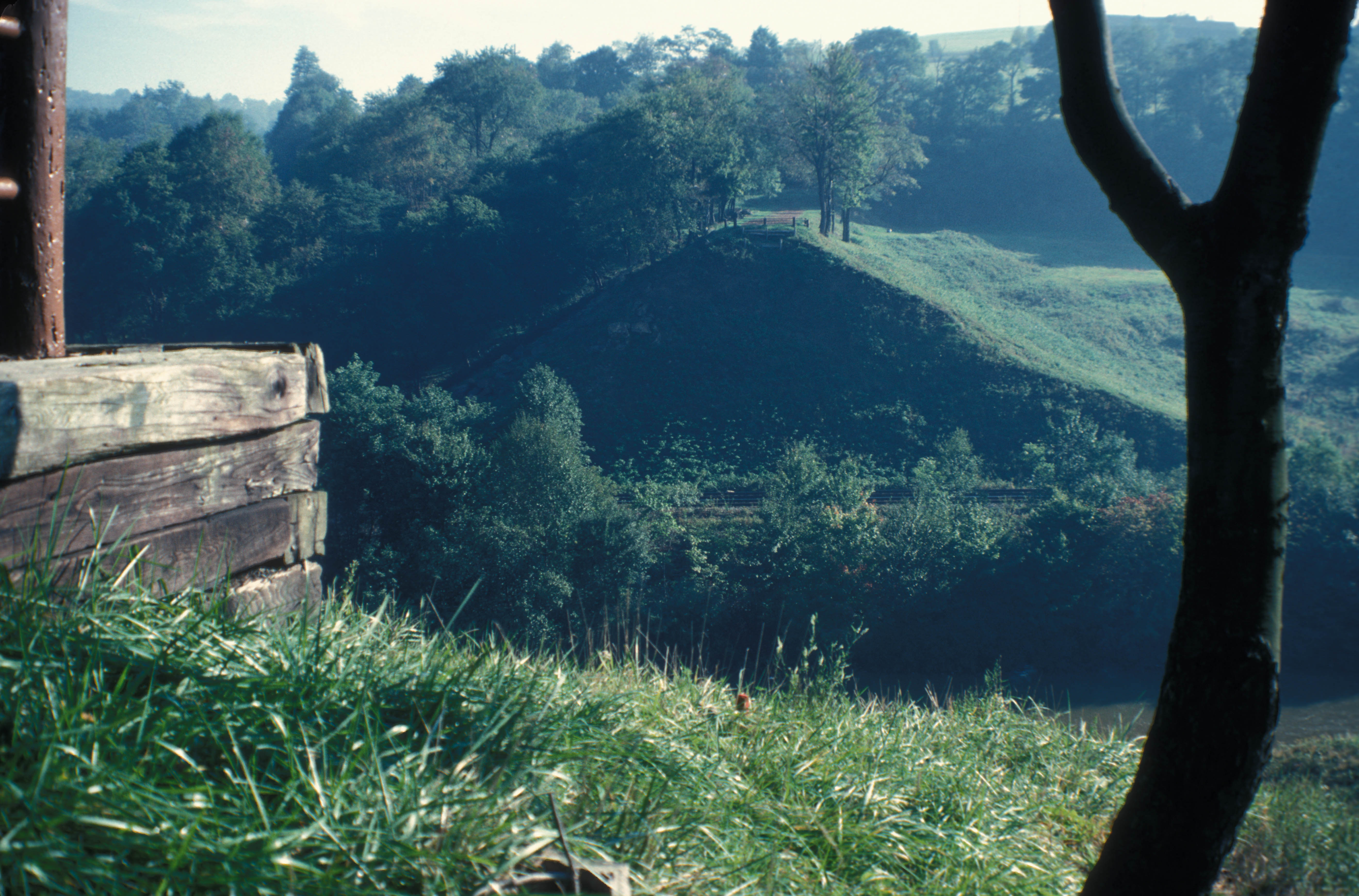
- Johnstown Flood National Memorial

- Coat of arms

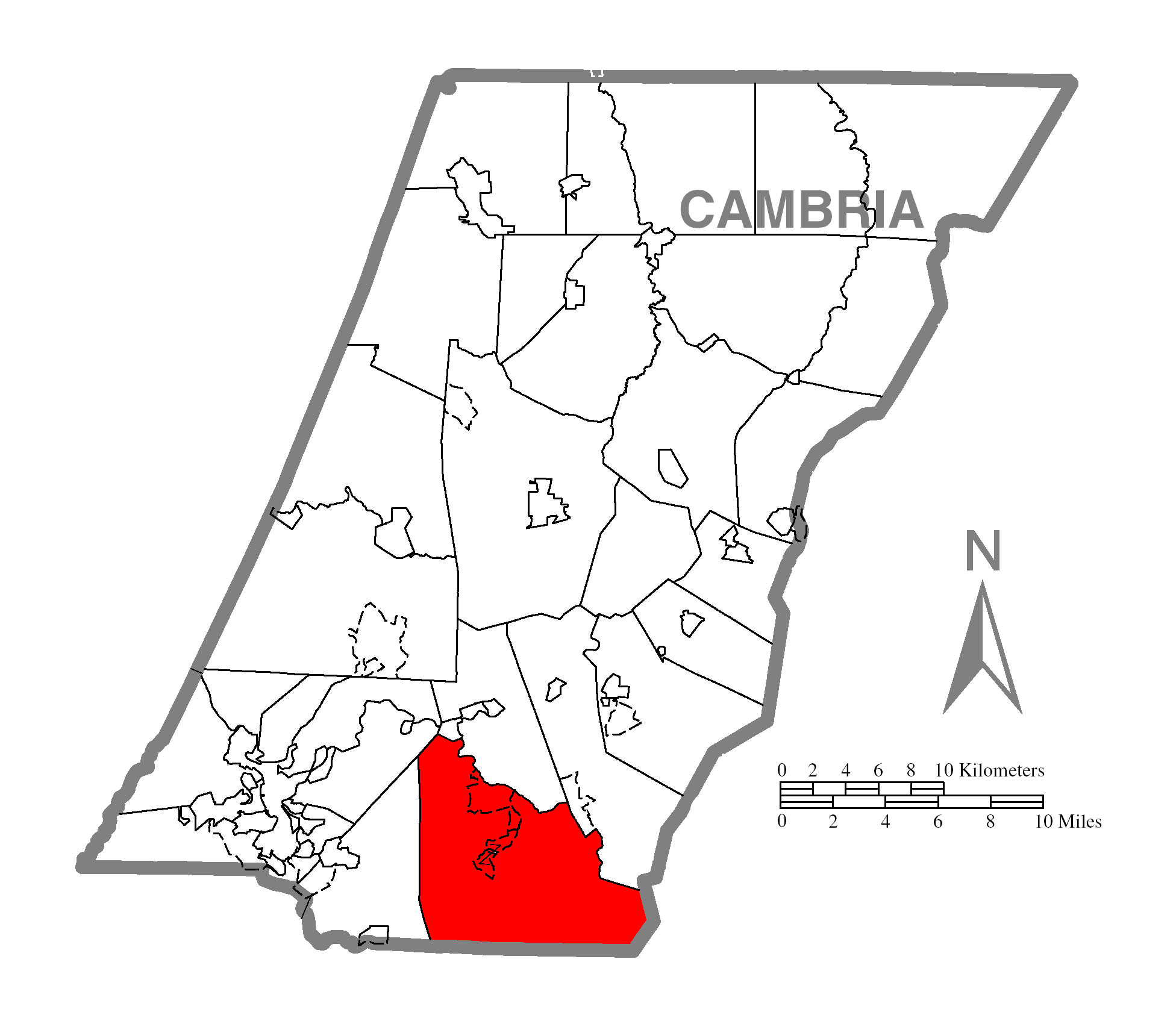
- Map of Cambria County, Pennsylvania highlighting Adams Township

- Map of Cambria County, Pennsylvania
- Country: United States
- State: Pennsylvania
- County: Cambria
- Incorporated: January 5, 1870

Area
  - Total: 45.97 sq mi (119.07 km^{2})
  - Land: 45.87 sq mi (118.79 km^{2})
  - Water: 0.11 sq mi (0.29 km^{2})

Population (2020)
  - Total: 5,752
  - Density: 125.4/sq mi (48.42/km^{2})
- Time zone: UTC-5 (Eastern (EST))
  - Summer (DST): UTC-4 (EDT)
- Area code: 814
- FIPS code: 42-021-00308
- Website: www.adamstwpcambria.com

Adams Township in Cambria County, Pennsylvania, United States, is a township that is part of the Johnstown, Pennsylvania Metropolitan Statistical Area. The population was 5,752 at the 2020 census, down from 5,972 at the 2010 census.

== History ==
The Johnstown Flood National Memorial was listed on the National Register of Historic Places in 1966. The South Fork Fishing and Hunting Club Historic District was listed in 1986.

== Geography ==
Adams Township is located in the southeast corner of Cambria County at 40.392581, -78.542633, approximately 12 miles (19 km) east of Johnstown. According to the United States Census Bureau, the township has a total area of 46.2 square miles (119.7 km^{2}), of which 46.1 square miles (119.4 km^{2}) is land and 0.12 square miles (0.3 km^{2}), or 0.26%, is water. The elevation rises to more 2,860 feet (870 m) above sea level in the southeastern part of the township, on Pot Ridge near the crest of the Allegheny Front.

== Communities ==
=== Census-designated places ===
Census-designated places are geographical areas designated by the U.S. Census Bureau for the purposes of compiling demographic data. They are not actual jurisdictions under Pennsylvania law. Other unincorporated communities, such as villages, may be listed here as well.

- Beaverdale
- Dunlo
- Salix
- Sidman
- St. Michael

=== Unincorporated communities ===
- Elton
- Eureka
- Krayn
- Llanfair

== Recreation ==
A portion of the Gallitzin State Forest (Babcock Division), a section of the Johnstown Flood National Memorial and a portion of the Pennsylvania State Game Lands Number 26 are located in the township.

== Demographics ==
Historical population
Census	Pop.	Note	%±
2000	6,495		—
2010	5,972		−8.1%
2020	5,752		−3.7%
2021 (est.)	5,722		−0.5%
U.S. Decennial Census

As of the census of 2000, there were 6,495 people, 2,521 households, and 1,913 families residing in the township. The population density was 139.6 inhabitants per square mile (53.9/km^{2}). There were 2,642 housing units at an average density of 56.8 per square mile (21.9/km^{2}). The racial makeup of the township was 98.89% White, 0.05% African American, 0.18% Native American, 0.12% Asian, 0.08% Pacific Islander, 0.15% from other races, and 0.52% from two or more races. Hispanic or Latino of any race were 0.75% of the population.

There were 2,521 households, out of which 31.1% had children under the age of 18 living with them, 63.4% were married couples living together, 9.2% had a female householder with no husband present, and 24.1% were non-families. 21.9% of all households were made up of individuals, and 11.4% had someone living alone who was 65 years of age or older. The average household size was 2.56 and the average family size was 2.96.

In the township the population was spread out, with 22.8% under the age of 18, 7.4% from 18 to 24, 27.3% from 25 to 44, 26.1% from 45 to 64, and 16.3% who were 65 years of age or older. The median age was 40 years. For every 100 females there were 96.1 males. For every 100 females age 18 and over, there were 92.1 males.

The median income for a household in the township was $32,442, and the median income for a family was $38,353. Males had a median income of $30,044 versus $20,606 for females. The per capita income for the township was $15,967. About 8.0% of families and 10.8% of the population were below the poverty line, including 14.3% of those under age 18 and 15.2% of those age 65 or over.

== See also ==
- Adams Township Municipal Authority
