= Cambria County, Pennsylvania =

County in Pennsylvania, United States

- County
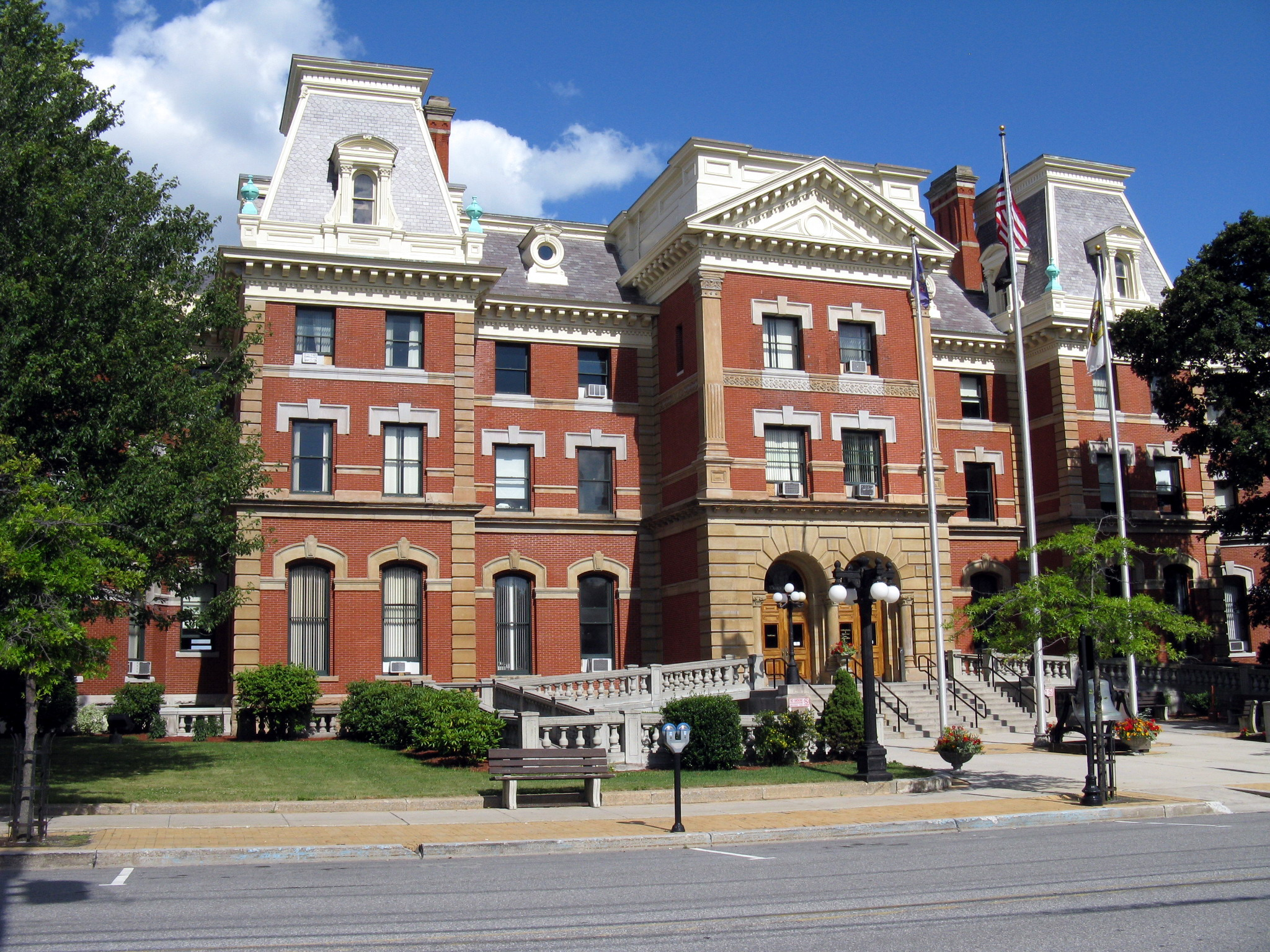
- Cambria County Courthouse, built in 1890-1891

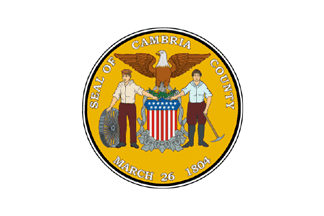
- Flag Seal

- Location within the U.S. state of Pennsylvania
- Coordinates: 40°29′N 78°43′W
- Country: United States
- State: Pennsylvania
- Founded: November 2, 1807
- Named for: Latin name of Wales
- Seat: Ebensburg
- Largest city: Johnstown

Area
  - Total: 694 sq mi (1,800 km^{2})
  - Land: 688 sq mi (1,780 km^{2})
  - Water: 5.3 sq mi (14 km^{2}) 0.8%

Population (2020)
  - Total: 133,472
  - Estimate (2025): 128,968 ▼
  - Density: 194/sq mi (75/km^{2})
- Time zone: UTC−5 (Eastern)
  - Summer (DST): UTC−4 (EDT)
- Congressional district: 13th
- Website: www.cambriacountypa.gov

Pennsylvania Historical Marker
- Designated: May 25, 1982

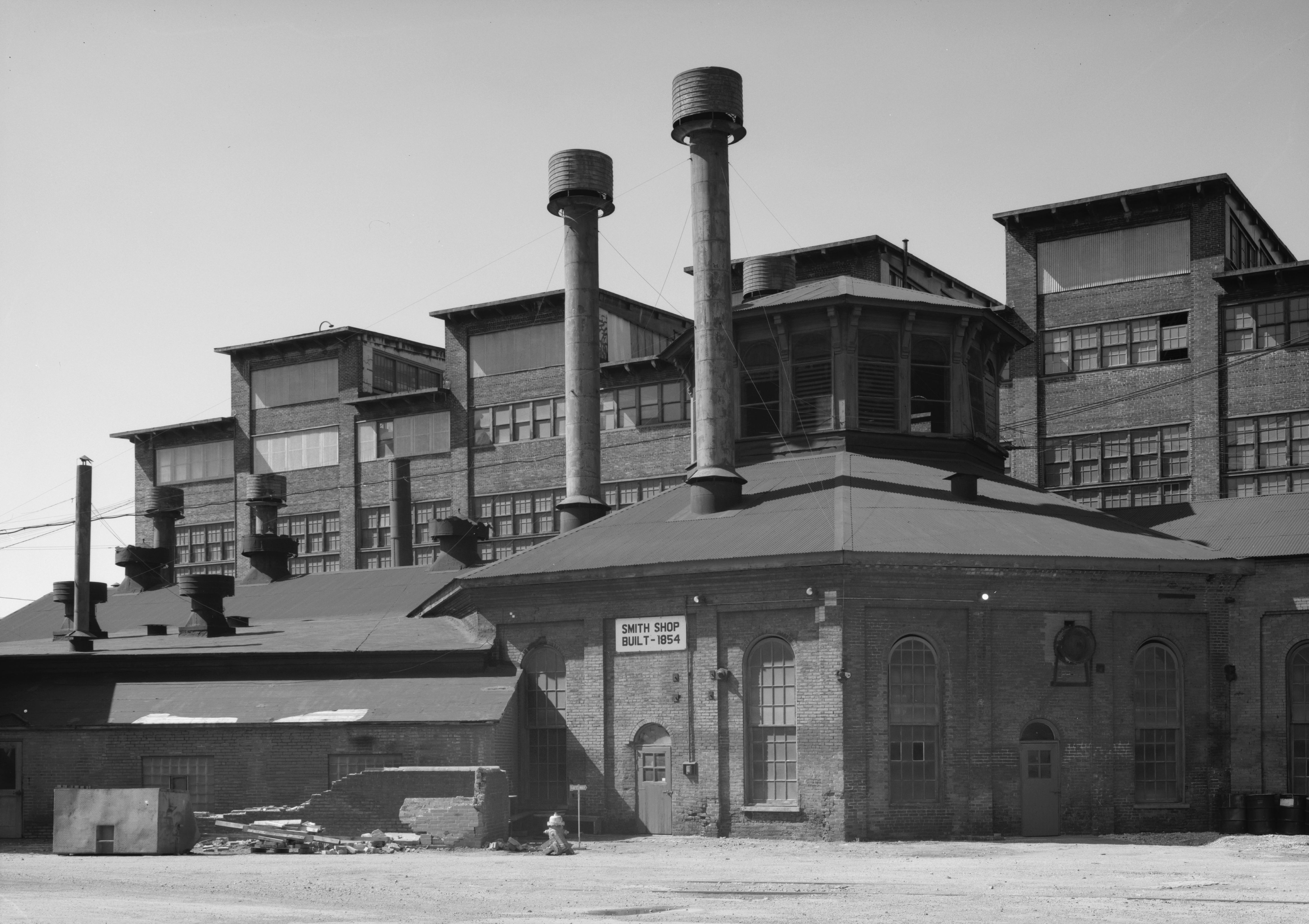
Cambria Iron Company, Johnstown, 1987

Cambria County is a county in the Commonwealth of Pennsylvania. As of the 2020 census, the population was 133,472. Its county seat is Ebensburg. The county was created on March 26, 1804, from parts of Bedford, Huntingdon, and Somerset counties and later organized in 1807. It was named for the nation of Wales, which in Latin is known as "Cambria". The county is part of the Southwest region of the commonwealth. (Note: Includes Westmoreland, Cambria, Fayette, Blair, Indiana, Somerset, Bedford, Huntingdon, Greene and Fulton Counties)

Cambria County comprises the Johnstown, PA metropolitan statistical area, which is also included in the Johnstown-Somerset, PA combined statistical area.

== Geography ==
According to the U.S. Census Bureau, the county has a total area of 694 square miles (1,800 km^{2}), of which 688 square miles (1,780 km^{2}) is land and 5.3 square miles (14 km^{2}) (0.8%) is water. Cambria has a warm-summer humid continental climate (Dfb) and average monthly temperatures in downtown Johnstown range from 27.8 °F in January to 71.0 °F in July, while in Ebensburg they range from 23.9 °F in January to 67.7 °F in July. PRISM Climate Group, Oregon State U Cambria County is one of the 423 counties served by the Appalachian Regional Commission, and it is identified as part of "Greater Appalachia" by Colin Woodard in his book American Nations: A History of the Eleven Rival Regional Cultures of North America.

=== Adjacent counties ===
- Clearfield County (north)
- Blair County (east)
- Bedford County (southeast)
- Somerset County (south)
- Westmoreland County (southwest)
- Indiana County (west)

=== National protected areas ===
- Allegheny Portage Railroad National Historic Site (part)
- Johnstown Flood National Memorial

=== Major highways ===
- US 22
- US 219
- US 422
- PA 36
- PA 53
- PA 56
- PA 160
- PA 164
- PA 240
- PA 271
- PA 403
- PA 553
- PA 756
- PA 865
- PA 869
- PA 985

== Demographics ==
Historical population
Census	Pop.	Note	%±
1810	2,117		—
1820	3,287		55.3%
1830	7,076		115.3%
1840	11,256		59.1%
1850	17,773		57.9%
1860	29,155		64.0%
1870	36,569		25.4%
1880	46,811		28.0%
1890	66,375		41.8%
1900	104,837		57.9%
1910	166,131		58.5%
1920	197,839		19.1%
1930	203,146		2.7%
1940	213,459		5.1%
1950	209,541		−1.8%
1960	203,283		−3.0%
1970	186,785		−8.1%
1980	183,263		−1.9%
1990	163,029		−11.0%
2000	152,598		−6.4%
2010	143,679		−5.8%
2020	133,472		−7.1%
2025 (est.)	128,968	▼	−3.4%

=== 2020 census ===
As of the 2020 census, the county had a population of 133,472. The median age was 46.0 years. 18.8% of residents were under the age of 18 and 23.4% of residents were 65 years of age or older. For every 100 females there were 97.9 males, and for every 100 females age 18 and over there were 96.0 males.

The racial makeup of the county was 90.1% White, 4.4% Black or African American, 0.1% American Indian and Alaska Native, 0.6% Asian, <0.1% Native Hawaiian and Pacific Islander, 0.6% from some other race, and 4.3% from two or more races. Hispanic or Latino residents of any race comprised 1.8% of the population.

53.9% of residents lived in urban areas, while 46.1% lived in rural areas.

There were 56,370 households in the county, of which 23.9% had children under the age of 18 living in them. Of all households, 45.3% were married-couple households, 20.0% were households with a male householder and no spouse or partner present, and 28.1% were households with a female householder and no spouse or partner present. About 32.7% of all households were made up of individuals and 16.4% had someone living alone who was 65 years of age or older.

There were 64,395 housing units, of which 12.5% were vacant. Among occupied housing units, 73.9% were owner-occupied and 26.1% were renter-occupied. The homeowner vacancy rate was 1.9% and the rental vacancy rate was 10.0%.

Cambria County, Pennsylvania – Racial and ethnic composition Note: the US Census treats Hispanic/Latino as an ethnic category. This table excludes Latinos from the racial categories and assigns them to a separate category. Hispanics/Latinos may be of any race.
Race / Ethnicity (NH = Non-Hispanic)	Pop 2000	Pop 2010	Pop 2020	% 2000	% 2010	% 2020
White alone (NH)	145,330	134,073	119,380	95.23%	93.31%	89.44%
Black or African American alone (NH)	4,224	5,073	5,665	2.76%	3.53%	4.24%
Native American or Alaska Native alone (NH)	122	108	96	0.07%	0.07%	0.07%
Asian alone (NH)	569	720	764	0.37%	0.50%	0.57%
Pacific Islander alone (NH)	36	28	35	0.02%	0.01%	0.02%
Other race alone (NH)	91	102	320	0.05%	0.07%	0.23%
Mixed race or Multiracial (NH)	874	1,569	4,747	0.57%	1.09%	3.55%
Hispanic or Latino (any race)	1,352	2,006	2,465	0.88%	1.39%	1.84%
Total	152,598	143,679	133,472	100.00%	100.00%	100.00%

=== 2000 census ===
As of the 2000 census, there were 152,598 people, 60,531 households, and 40,616 families residing in the county. The population density was 222 people per square mile (86 people/km^{2}). There were 65,796 housing units at an average density of 96 units per square mile (37/km^{2}). The racial makeup of the county was 95.80% White, 2.83% Black or African American, 0.09% Native American, 0.38% Asian, 0.02% Pacific Islander, 0.25% from other races, and 0.64% from two or more races. 0.89% of the population were Hispanic or Latino of any race. 27.7% were of German, 10.2% Irish, 10.1% Italian, 10.0% Polish, 6.5% Slovak, 6.2% American and 5.6% English ancestry.

There were 60,531 households, out of which 27.00% had children under the age of 18 living with them, 52.80% were married couples living together, 10.40% had a female householder with no spouse present, and 32.90% were non-families. 29.80% of all households were made up of individuals, and 15.60% had someone living alone who was 65 years of age or older. The average household size was 2.38 and the average family size was 2.96.

In the county, the population was spread out, with 21.00% under the age of 18, 9.00% from 18 to 24, 26.20% from 25 to 44, 24.10% from 45 to 64, and 19.70% who were 65 years of age or older. The median age was 41 years. For every 100 females there were 94.20 males. For every 100 females age 18 and over, there were 91.30 males.

== Law and government ==
United States presidential election results for Cambria County, Pennsylvania
Year	Republican		Democratic		Third party(ies)	
Year	No.	%	No.	%	No.	%
1880	3,962	45.61%	4,555	52.44%	169	1.95%
1884	4,253	44.45%	4,816	50.34%	498	5.21%
1888	5,517	47.11%	5,948	50.79%	246	2.10%
1892	6,020	47.42%	6,259	49.30%	417	3.28%
1896	8,865	55.33%	6,843	42.71%	314	1.96%
1900	10,476	57.99%	7,168	39.68%	420	2.33%
1904	13,109	61.78%	7,232	34.08%	879	4.14%
1908	12,325	57.87%	7,979	37.47%	992	4.66%
1912	3,252	14.97%	7,282	33.52%	11,191	51.51%
1916	10,688	49.75%	9,416	43.83%	1,378	6.41%
1920	19,629	63.91%	6,961	22.67%	4,122	13.42%
1924	24,728	51.77%	13,563	28.40%	9,473	19.83%
1928	29,494	51.79%	27,024	47.46%	427	0.75%
1932	21,351	41.75%	28,197	55.13%	1,597	3.12%
1936	24,378	33.72%	46,687	64.57%	1,239	1.71%
1940	30,306	41.29%	42,894	58.44%	201	0.27%
1944	28,203	41.39%	39,676	58.22%	264	0.39%
1948	27,725	39.37%	41,533	58.98%	1,164	1.65%
1952	39,294	43.54%	50,774	56.26%	182	0.20%
1956	46,373	52.55%	41,753	47.31%	123	0.14%
1960	37,062	41.35%	52,409	58.48%	151	0.17%
1964	26,281	32.21%	55,183	67.63%	134	0.16%
1968	33,280	42.05%	41,225	52.08%	4,645	5.87%
1972	43,825	60.05%	27,950	38.30%	1,200	1.64%
1976	32,469	45.02%	38,797	53.79%	862	1.20%
1980	33,072	45.85%	36,121	50.08%	2,938	4.07%
1984	32,173	44.50%	39,865	55.14%	258	0.36%
1988	25,626	39.70%	38,517	59.67%	409	0.63%
1992	20,770	31.30%	34,334	51.75%	11,245	16.95%
1996	20,341	34.32%	30,391	51.27%	8,543	14.41%
2000	28,001	46.45%	30,308	50.27%	1,977	3.28%
2004	34,048	50.83%	32,591	48.66%	344	0.51%
2008	31,995	48.47%	32,451	49.16%	1,560	2.36%
2012	35,163	58.10%	24,249	40.06%	1,114	1.84%
2016	42,258	66.45%	18,867	29.67%	2,464	3.87%
2020	48,085	67.96%	21,730	30.71%	936	1.32%
2024	49,408	69.25%	21,177	29.68%	760	1.07%

United States Senate election results for Cambria County, Pennsylvania1
Year	Republican		Democratic		Third party(ies)	
Year	No.	%	No.	%	No.	%
1994	21,097	39.05%	30,395	56.26%	2,530	4.68%
2000	29,514	49.04%	28,932	48.07%	1,736	2.88%
2006	18,928	36.31%	33,196	63.69%	0	0.00%
2012	30,202	50.08%	28,779	47.72%	1,330	2.21%
2018	27,367	55.17%	21,590	43.52%	650	1.31%
2024	46,482	65.46%	22,887	32.23%	1,635	2.30%

United States Senate election results for Cambria County, Pennsylvania3
Year	Republican		Democratic		Third party(ies)	
Year	No.	%	No.	%	No.	%
1992	30,988	46.78%	31,589	47.69%	3,662	5.53%
1998	22,335	49.56%	21,720	48.19%	1,013	2.25%
2004	33,647	50.99%	27,948	42.35%	4,396	6.66%
2010	24,254	51.30%	23,028	48.70%	0	0.00%
2016	36,948	58.90%	21,894	34.90%	3,886	6.20%
2022	35,847	63.62%	18,849	33.45%	1,652	2.93%

Pennsylvania Gubernatorial election results for Cambria County
Year	Republican		Democratic		Third party(ies)	
Year	No.	%	No.	%	No.	%
1970	26,184	39.72%	37,889	57.48%	1,847	2.80%
1974	26,946	43.85%	34,017	55.36%	484	0.79%
1978	22,427	36.96%	37,771	62.25%	481	0.79%
1982	27,539	44.58%	33,992	55.02%	249	0.40%
1986	17,158	30.17%	39,239	69.00%	475	0.84%
1990	10,104	20.03%	40,331	79.97%	0	0.00%
1994	13,944	25.63%	31,043	57.05%	9,427	17.32%
1998	22,266	49.51%	12,675	28.18%	10,034	22.31%
2002	25,556	54.61%	20,305	43.39%	935	2.00%
2006	20,506	39.16%	31,856	60.84%	0	0.00%
2010	27,444	57.72%	20,102	42.28%	0	0.00%
2014	18,325	45.42%	22,021	54.58%	0	0.00%
2018	27,530	55.18%	21,639	43.37%	725	1.45%
2022	32,381	57.53%	22,885	40.66%	1,015	1.80%

Chart of Voter Registration
1. Republican (51.3%)
2. Democratic (37.8%)
3. Independent (8.23%)
4. Other Parties (2.61%)

Cambria was a swing county in statewide elections until the 2010s, with all four statewide winners carrying it in 2008. Al Gore received 50.3% of the county vote to 46.4% for George W. Bush in 2000, but Bush carried it with 50.8% of the vote to 48.7% for John Kerry in 2004–only the third time since 1928 that the county had supported a Republican for president. Cambria returned to the Democratic presidential column in 2008, with Barack Obama receiving 49.4% of the vote to 48.7% for John McCain. In 2011 the GOP won a majority on the county commissioners board and in 2012 gave Mitt Romney 58.1% of the vote to Barack Obama's 40.1%.

In 2016, Donald Trump carried the county with 66.5% of the vote to Hillary Clinton's 29.7%, winning the county by 36.8%. This broke the modern record for margin of victory in the county of 35.4% set by Lyndon Johnson in 1964. Four years later, Trump won the county with an even bigger margin of 37.34%.

=== Voter registration ===
As of April 29, 2024, there were 84,932 registered voters in Cambria County.

- Republican: 43,780 (51.55%)
- Democratic: 31,863 (37.52%)
- Independent: 7,069 (8.32%)
- Third Party: 2,220 (2.61%)

=== County commissioners ===
Commissioner	Party
Thomas C. Chernisky	Democrat
Keith Rager	Republican
Scott W. Hunt	Republican

=== Other county offices ===
Office	Official	Party
District Attorney	Gregory J. Neugebauer	Republican
Clerk of Courts	Max R. Pavlovich	Republican
Controller	Ed Cernic Jr.	Democrat
Coroner	Jeffrey Lees	Republican
Prothonotary	Lisa Crynock	Republican
Recorder of Deeds	Melissa Kimla	Republican
Register of Wills	Cindy Perrone	Republican
Sheriff	Don Robertson	Republican
Treasurer	Lisa Kozorosky	Republican

=== State senate ===
District	Senator	Party
35	Wayne Langerholc	Republican

=== State House of Representatives ===
District	Representative	Party
71	James Rigby	Republican
72	Frank Burns	Democrat
73	Dallas Kephart	Republican

=== United States House of Representatives ===
District	Representative	Party
13	John Joyce	Republican

=== United States Senate ===
Senator	Party
David McCormick	Republican
John Fetterman	Democrat

== Public services ==
Waste management for the county is regulated by the Cambria County Solid Waste Management Authority.

== Education ==
=== Colleges and universities ===
- Christ the Saviour Seminary, Johnstown
- Mount Aloysius College
- Saint Francis University
- University of Pittsburgh at Johnstown University of Pittsburgh Johnstown | University of Pittsburgh

=== Community, junior, and technical colleges ===
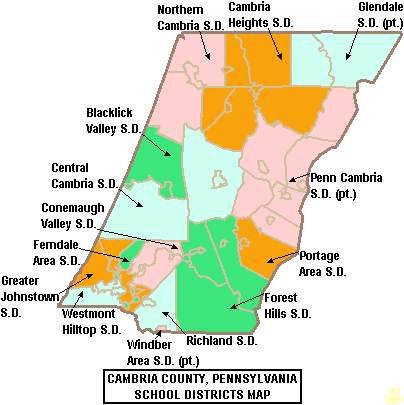
Map of Cambria County, Pennsylvania School Districts

- Cambria-Rowe Business College
- Pennsylvania Highlands Community College
- Commonwealth Technical Institute, Johnstown
- Wrightco Technologies Technical Training Institute, Ebensburg

=== Public school districts ===
School districts include:

- Blacklick Valley School District
- Cambria Heights School District
- Central Cambria School District
- Conemaugh Valley School District
- Ferndale Area School District
- Forest Hills School District
- Glendale School District (also in Clearfield County)
- Greater Johnstown School District
- Northern Cambria School District
- Penn Cambria School District (also in Blair County)
- Portage Area School District
- Richland School District
- Westmont Hilltop School District
- Windber Area School District (also in Somerset County)

=== Private schools ===
- All Saints Catholic School, Cresson
- Appalachian Youth Service
- Arbutus Park Manor, Johnstown
- Bishop Carroll High School (Ebensburg, Pennsylvania)
- Bishop McCort High School, Johnstown
- Cambria County Child Development Center, Ebensburg
- Cambria County Christian School, Johnstown
- Carousel Learning & Development Center, Johnstown
- Cathedral Catholic Academy, Johnstown
- Center for Achievement
- Children's Express Inc., Cresson
- Easter Seal Day Care Center, Johnstown
- Genesis Christian Academy, Johnstown
- Holy Name School, Ebensburg
- Houston House, Johnstown
- Laurel Highlands Therapeutic Academy, Ebensburg
- Little Learning Lamp, Johnstown
- Northern Cambria Catholic School, Nicktown
- Occupational Preparation School, Ebensburg
- Our Mother of Sorrow School, Johnstown
- Richland Academy Montessori School, Johnstown
- Sean Davison School of Driving, Lilly
- St Michael's School, Loretto
- St Sophia Orthodox Christian Academy, Johnstown

According to the Pennsylvania Department of Education's Ed Names and Addresses, July 1, 2015

=== Vocational/Technical schools ===
- Admiral Peary Vocational Technical School
- Greater Johnstown Career & Technology Center

== Recreation ==
There are two Pennsylvania state parks in Cambria County.

- Prince Gallitzin State Park is named for Demetrius Gallitzin, a Russian nobleman turned Catholic priest who was instrumental in the settlement of Cambria County.
- Laurel Ridge State Park surrounds a 70-mile (113-km) hiking trail that begins in Cambria County and ends at Ohiopyle State Park in Fayette County.

== Communities ==
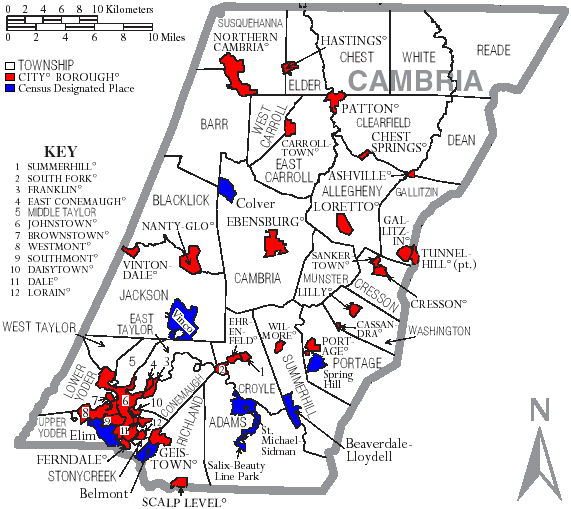
Map of Cambria County, Pennsylvania with Municipal Labels showing Cities and Boroughs (red), Townships (white), and Census-designated places (blue).

Under Pennsylvania law, there are four types of incorporated municipalities: cities, boroughs, townships, and, in at most two cases, towns. The following cities, boroughs and townships are located in Cambria County:

=== City ===
- Johnstown

=== Boroughs ===
- Ashville
- Brownstown
- Carrolltown
- Cassandra
- Chest Springs
- Cresson
- Daisytown
- Dale
- East Conemaugh
- Ebensburg (county seat)
- Ehrenfeld
- Ferndale
- Franklin
- Gallitzin
- Geistown
- Hastings
- Lilly
- Lorain
- Loretto
- Nanty Glo
- Northern Cambria
- Patton
- Portage
- Sankertown
- Scalp Level
- South Fork
- Southmont
- Summerhill
- Tunnelhill (partly in Blair County)
- Vintondale
- Westmont
- Wilmore

=== Townships ===
- Adams
- Allegheny
- Barr
- Blacklick
- Cambria
- Chest
- Clearfield
- Conemaugh
- Cresson
- Croyle
- Dean
- East Carroll
- East Taylor
- Elder
- Gallitzin
- Jackson
- Lower Yoder
- Middle Taylor
- Munster
- Portage
- Reade
- Richland
- Stonycreek
- Summerhill
- Susquehanna
- Upper Yoder
- Washington
- West Carroll
- West Taylor
- White

=== Census-designated places ===
Census-designated places are geographical areas designated by the U.S. Census Bureau for the purposes of compiling demographic data. They are not actual jurisdictions under Pennsylvania law. Other unincorporated communities, such as villages, may be listed here as well.

- Beaverdale
- Belmont
- Blandburg
- Colver
- Dunlo
- Elim
- Flinton
- Mundys Corner
- Oakland
- Revloc
- Riverside
- Salix
- Sidman
- Spring Hill
- St. Michael
- University of Pittsburgh Johnstown
- Vinco
- Westwood

=== Unincorporated communities ===
- Belsano
- Coupon
- Dean
- Dysart
- Elmora
- Elton
- Emeigh
- Fallentimber
- Garmantown
- Glasgow
- Hollentown
- Marsteller
- Mineral Point
- New Germany
- Nicktown
- Parkhill
- Saint Benedict
- Saint Boniface
- Saint Lawrence
- Twin Rocks

=== Population ranking ===
The population ranking of the following table is based on the 2010 census of Cambria County.

† county seat

Rank	City/Town/etc.	Municipal type	Population (2010 Census)
1	Johnstown	City	20,978
2	Westmont	Borough	5,181
3	Northern Cambria	Borough	3,835
4	Elim	CDP	3,727
5	† Ebensburg	Borough	3,351
6	Belmont	CDP	2,784
7	Nanty Glo	Borough	2,734
8	Portage	Borough	2,638
9	Geistown	Borough	2,467
10	Southmont	Borough	2,284
11	Patton	Borough	1,769
12	Cresson	Borough	1,711
13	Gallitzin	Borough	1,668
14	Mundys Corner	CDP	1,651
15	Ferndale	Borough	1,636
16	Oakland	CDP	1,578
17	University of Pittsburgh (Johnstown)	CDP	1,572
18	Vinco	CDP	1,305
19	Loretto	Borough	1,302
20	Hastings	Borough	1,278
21	Dale	Borough	1,234
22	East Conemaugh	Borough	1,220
23	Salix	CDP	1,149
24	Beaverdale	CDP	1,035
25	Lilly	Borough	968
26	Colver	CDP	959
27	South Fork	Borough	928
28	Carrolltown	Borough	853
29	Spring Hill	CDP	839
30	Scalp Level	Borough	778
31	Lorain	Borough	759
32	Brownstown	Borough	744
33	Sankertown	Borough	675
34	Revloc	CDP	570
35	Summerhill	Borough	490
36	Sidman	CDP	431
37	Vintondale	Borough	414
38	St. Michael	CDP	408
39	Blandburg	CDP	402
40	Riverside	CDP	381
41	Tunnelhill (partially in Blair County)	Borough	363
42	Dunlo	CDP	342
43	Daisytown	Borough	326
44	Franklin	Borough	323
45	Ehrenfeld	Borough	228
46	Ashville	Borough	227
47	Wilmore	Borough	225
48	Chest Springs	Borough	149
49	Cassandra	Borough	147

== See also ==
- Cambria Somerset Authority - Water supply authority for Cambria County and Somerset County
- National Register of Historic Places listings in Cambria County, Pennsylvania
