= Sidman, Pennsylvania =

Unincorporated community in Pennsylvania, US

- Census-designated place
- Location within the U.S. state of Pennsylvania Sidman (the United States)
- Coordinates: 40°19′46″N 78°44′49″W
- Country: United States
- State: Pennsylvania
- County: Cambria
- Township: Adams

Area
  - Total: 0.99 sq mi (2.57 km^{2})
  - Land: 0.99 sq mi (2.57 km^{2})
  - Water: 0 sq mi (0.0 km^{2})
- Elevation: 1,637 ft (499 m)

Population (2010)
  - Total: 431
  - Density: 435/sq mi (167.8/km^{2})
- Time zone: UTC-5 (Eastern (EST))
  - Summer (DST): UTC-4 (EDT)
- ZIP code: 15955
- FIPS code: 42-70640
- GNIS feature ID: 1213423

Sidman is an unincorporated community and census-designated place in Cambria County, Pennsylvania, United States. Its ZIP code is 15955. It was part of the St. Michael-Sidman census-designated place, before it was split into two separate CDPs during the 2010 census. The population of Sidman as of the 2010 census was 431.

== Education ==
It is in the Forest Hills School District.
