= Little Conemaugh River =

River in Pennsylvania, United States

Coordinates: 40.40728°N 78.65369°W

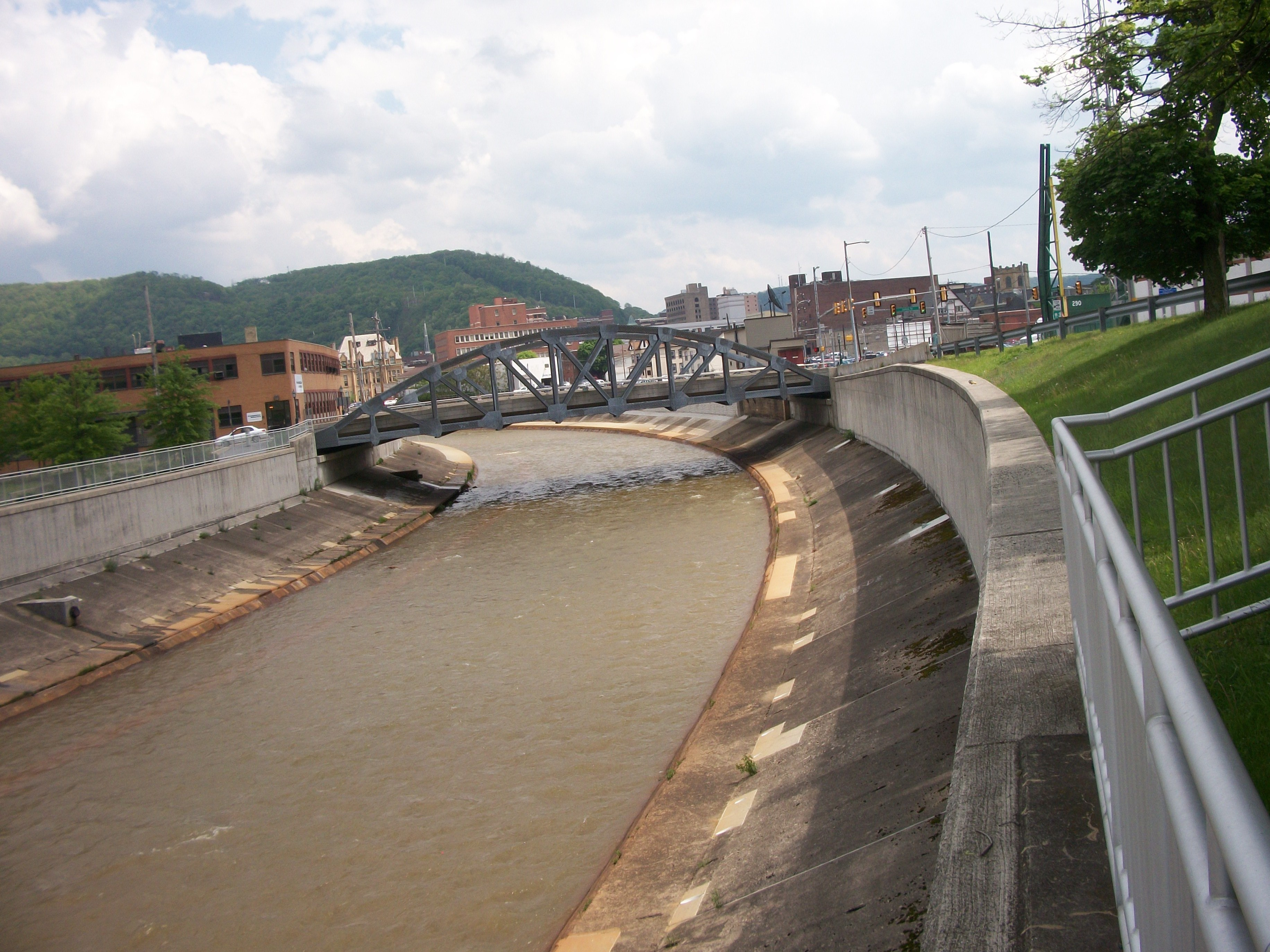
The Little Conemaugh River runs through a channel in Johnstown, just a few hundred feet from where its confluence with the Stonycreek River forms the Conemaugh.

The Little Conemaugh River is a tributary of the Conemaugh River, approximately 30 miles (48 km) long, in western Pennsylvania in the United States.

The main branch rises in eastern Cambria County, along the western slope of the Appalachian ridge separating the watersheds of the Ohio and Susquehanna rivers. It flows west-southwest through the mountains, past Cassandra, Portage, and Summerhill, where it is joined by the South Fork Little Conemaugh River. It then follows a west-northwest course to Johnstown, where it joins the Stonycreek River to form the Conemaugh River.

== Mine drainage ==
The river flows through scenic mountainous areas but is considered severely degraded by abandoned mine drainage, most notably the Hughes bore hole, from the long exploitation of the region's coal resources. The recovery of the river is an ongoing project of federal, state, and private agencies.

== History ==
Only four navigable passes pierce the barrier range of the Appalachian Mountains in this part of the United States, one of which leads to the Conemaugh Valley. The headwaters of the Little Conemaugh form on the western side of Tunnelhill, Pennsylvania, at Cresson Pass in northern Cambria County, which is transited by the line of the Eastern Continental drainage divide. The river's upper valley falls off gradually enough that the terrain forms a natural transportation corridor navigable by muscle-powered vehicles such as Indian travois and Conestoga wagons. Consequently, when the earliest settlers pushed west from the Susquehanna basin, the waters falling or rising on the eastern side of the drainage divide ran down through valleys Amerindians had used for centuries to cross between the west and east sides of the mountains.

In the early 19th century, when Pennsylvania made a bid to connect to new business opportunities in the rapidly growing Ohio Valley, the state government launched the great engineering project of the Pennsylvania Canal System, which connected eastern and western Pennsylvania via the Conemaugh Valley and Johnstown. Several major dams were constructed on the rivers of the Conemaugh drainage system in order to impound reservoirs which could be used as permanent canals and towpaths, including one on the South Fork Little Conemaugh in the mountains upstream of Johnstown. The river was paralleled by the western inclines of the Allegheny Portage Railroad, connecting the two branches of the Pennsylvania Main Line Canals with the western terminus of the portage railroad at Johnstown. Created as part of the Pennsylvania Main Line of Public Works, the railway operated from its completion in 1834 until it was sold in 1854 to the Pennsylvania Railroad, which took over its rights of way. Thereafter, the banks of the Conemaugh and Little Conemaugh hosted one of the most important rail transport corridors running east–west across the Appalachian Mountains. As the canal system was gradually made obsolete by faster and cheaper rail transport, the impoundments in the valley were drained or sold to private interests. The reservoir on the South Fork Little Conemaugh was repurposed as a recreational property for use by members of a private fishing and hunting club.

On May 31, 1889, the dam holding back this reservoir failed during a period of extremely heavy rainfall, sending a wall of water up to 60 ft (18 m) high down the Little Conemaugh at 40 mph (64 km/h), causing massive flooding in the towns along its banks, including Johnstown, and resulting in the loss of 2,209 lives in the worst civilian disaster of the 19th century in the United States. The event is remembered to history as the Johnstown Flood.

== See also ==
- List of rivers of Pennsylvania
- List of tributaries of the Allegheny River
- South Fork Fishing and Hunting Club
