= Ferndale Area School District =

School district in Pennsylvania

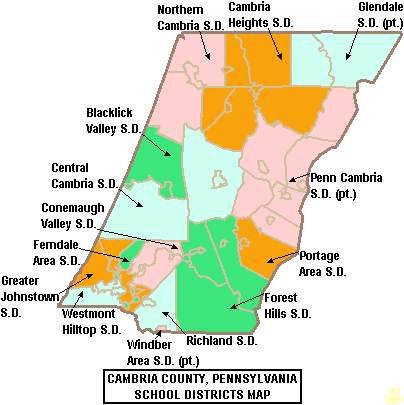

Address
- 100 Dartmouth Ave Johnstown, Cambria County, Pennsylvania, 15905-2305; United States

District information
- Grades: PS-12

Other information
- Website: fasdk12.org

The Ferndale Area School District is a diminutive, suburban, public school district in Cambria County, Pennsylvania. It serves the boroughs of Brownstown, Dale, Ferndale, and Lorain as well as Middle Taylor Township - none of which border on each other. The district encompasses just 6 square miles (16 km^{2}). According to 2000 federal census data, it served a resident population of 5,759. By 2010, the district's population had declined to 5,100 people. The educational attainment levels for the Ferndale Area School District population (25 years old and over) were 90.3% high school graduates and 14.2% college graduates. The district is one of the 500 public school districts of Pennsylvania.

According to the Pennsylvania Budget and Policy Center, 61.5% of the district's pupils lived at 185% or below the Federal Poverty level as shown by their eligibility for the federal free or reduced price school meal programs in 2012. In 2009, Ferndale Area School District residents’ per capita income was $18,430, while the median family income was $35,743. In the Commonwealth, the median family income was $49,501 and the United States median family income was $49,445, in 2010. In Cambria County, the median household income was $39,574. By 2013, the median household income in the United States rose to $52,100.

Ferndale Area School District operates two schools: Ferndale Area Elementary School and Ferndale Area Junior/Senior High School. Neither Ferndale Area Elementary or the district administration offices are within the school district, instead being located in Westmont. High school students may choose to attend Greater Johnstown Career and Technology Center for training in the construction and mechanical trades. The Appalachia Intermediate Unit IU8 provides the district with a wide variety of services like specialized education for disabled students and hearing; driver education training; speech and visual disability services and professional development for staff and faculty.

== Extracurriculars ==
The Ferndale Area School District offers a variety of clubs, activities, and a sports program.

=== Sports ===
Junior High School Sports Programs

Boys

- Baseball
- Basketball
- Golf

Girls

- Basketball
- Softball
- Volleyball

According to PIAA directory July 2014

Boys varsity

- Baseball - Class A
- Basketball - Class A
- Football - Class A
- Golf - Class AA

Girls varsity

- Basketball - Class A
- Golf - Class AA
- Softball - Class A
- Volleyball - Class A

Co-ed

Cross Country
