= Westmont =

Westmont may refer to:

== Places ==
- Westmont, California
- Westmont, Illinois
- Westmont, New Jersey
- Westmont, Pennsylvania
  - Westmont Historic District

== Schools ==
- Westmont College, a private interdenominational Christian liberal arts college in Santa Barbara, California, USA
- Westmont Community Unit School District 201, Westmont, Illinois, USA; school district
- Westmont High School (disambiguation)

== See also ==
- Westmont station (disambiguation)
- Mount West, Antarctica
- Mountain west (disambiguation)
- West Mountain (disambiguation)
- Westmount (disambiguation)
