= Stackhouse =

Stackhouse is a surname. Notable people and characters with the name include:

== People ==
- Ann Rule (née Stackhouse; 1931–2015), American writer
- Charles Stackhouse (born 1980), American football player
- Eleanor Stackhouse Atkinson (1863–1942), American author, journalist and teacher
- Eli T. Stackhouse (1824–1892), U.S. Representative from South Carolina
- Emily Stackhouse (1811–1870), Cornish botanical illustrator
- Houston Stackhouse (1910–1980) American Delta blues guitarist and singer
- Jerry Stackhouse (born 1974), American professional basketball player
- John Stackhouse (disambiguation), multiple people, including:
  - John G. Stackhouse, Jr. (born 1960), Canadian scholar and writer
  - John Stackhouse (botanist) (1742–1819), English botanist
  - John Stackhouse (colonial administrator), administrator of the English East India Company
  - John Stackhouse (Globe and Mail) (born 1962), Canadian journalist and author
- Max Lynn Stackhouse (1935–2016), professor at Princeton Theological Seminary
- Nazir Stackhouse (born 2002), American football player
- Reginald Stackhouse (1925–2016), Canadian educator and former politician
- Robert Stackhouse (born 1942), American artist and sculptor
- Ron Stackhouse (born 1949), Canadian ice hockey defenseman
- Sarah Stackhouse (1936–2024), American dancer
- Ted Stackhouse (1894–1975), Canadian ice hockey defenceman
- Thomas Stackhouse (1677–1752), English theologian and controversialist
- Thomas Stackhouse (antiquary) (1756–1836), English educational writer and antiquary, grandson of the theologian Thomas Stackhouse

== Fictional characters ==
- Adele Stackhouse, character in The Southern Vampire Mysteries and True Blood
- Jason Stackhouse, character in The Southern Vampire Mysteries and True Blood
- Lt. Jeremy Stackhouse, a character in the 2001 film Behind Enemy Lines
- Sookie Stackhouse, the main character in The Southern Vampire Mysteries and True Blood

== See also ==
- Stackhouse, North Yorkshire, England
- Stackhouse Park, Westmont, Pennsylvania
