= Ferndale Area Junior/Senior High School =

Coordinates: 40.2876316°N 78.9166498°W

Ferndale Area Junior-Senior High School
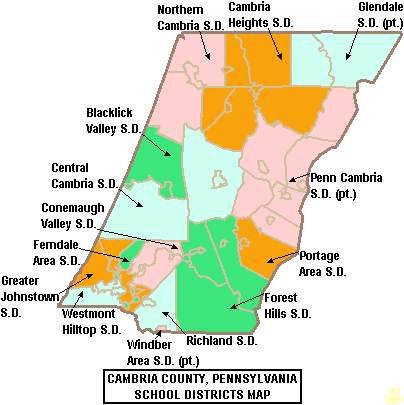

Location
- 600 Harlan Avenue; Johnstown, Pennsylvania 15905; United States

Information
- Type: Public, secondary
- Motto: "Big enough to challenge. . .small enough to care."
- Established: 1928
- School district: Ferndale Area School District
- Principal: Willam Brotz (Assistant Superintendent); Assistant Principal: Bernard Conway
- Staff: Staff directory
- Faculty: 38 teachers
- Enrollment: 284 (2023–2024)
- Colors: Black and Yellow
- Athletics: The Yellowjackets & The Lady Yellowjackets
- Athletics conference: Western Pennsylvania Athletic Conference (WestPAC)
- Mascot: The Yellowjackets
- Website: www.fasdk12.org

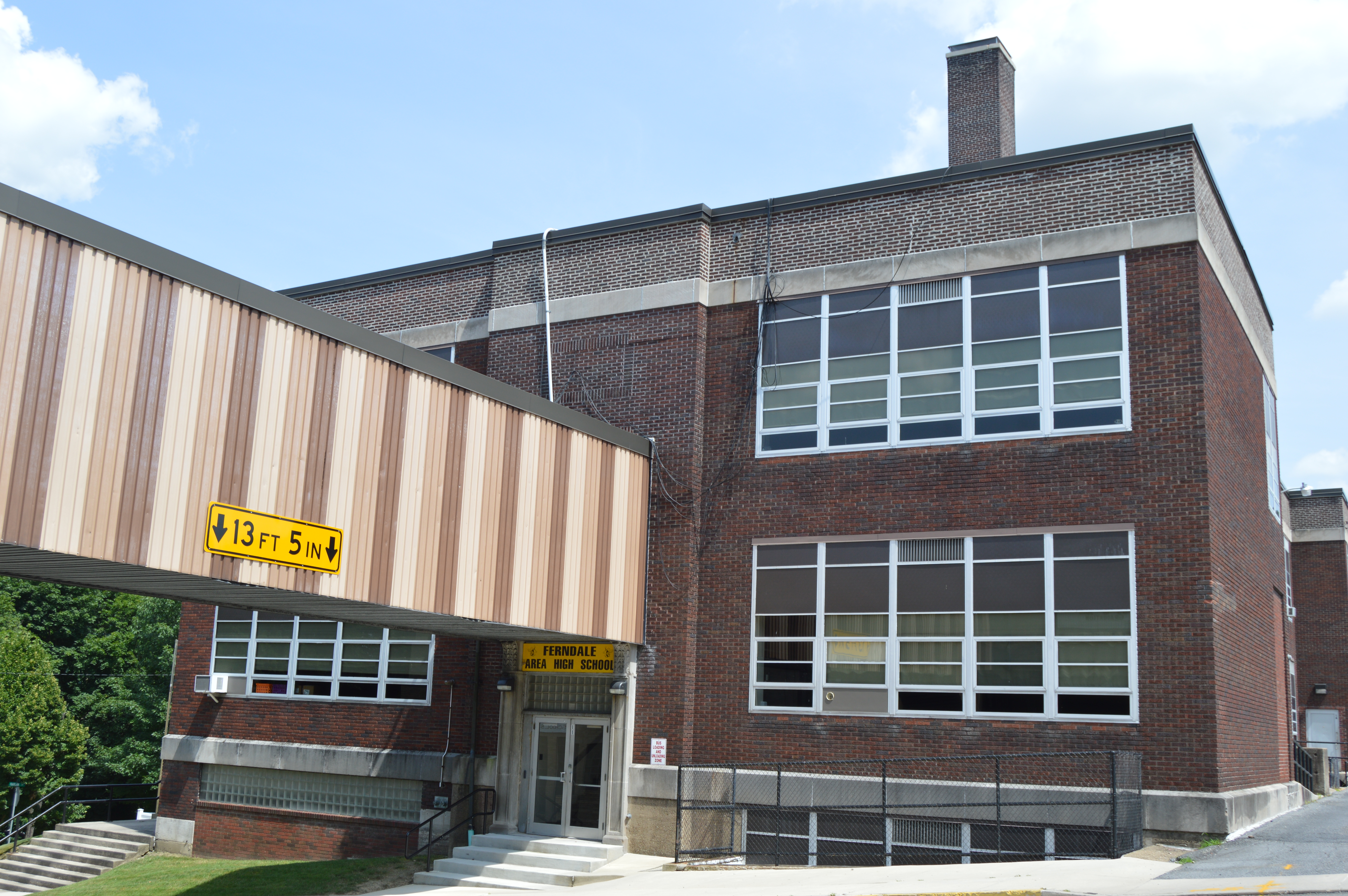
Clay Street entrance

The Ferndale Area Junior-Senior High School is a public high school, located at 600 Harlan Avenue, Ferndale, Cambria County, Pennsylvania. It serves the boroughs of Brownstown, Dale and Lorain as well as Middle Taylor Township. In 2014, Ferndale Area Junior Senior High School's enrollment was reported as 337 pupils in 7th through 12th grades. The current high school buildings opened in 1931 and 1938 and were renovated between 1978 and 1979. They also have had a couple different renovation projects over the years.

Ferndale Area Junior Senior High School serves the boroughs of: Brownstown, Dale, Ferndale, and Lorain as well as Middle Taylor Township - none of which border on each other.

== Extracurriculars ==
The Ferndale Area School District offers a wide variety of clubs, activities and an extensive, publicly funded sports program.

== Athletics ==
The high school's mascot is the Yellowjacket. The school's official colors are black and yellow, with white and/or black often appearing in athletics uniforms. Ferndale Area Junior-Senior High School is a member of the Western Pennsylvania Athletic Conference (WestPAC)] for most sports.

Junior High School Sports Programs

Boys

- Baseball
- Basketball
- Golf

Girls

- Basketball
- Softball
- Volleyball

According to PIAA directory July 2014

Boys Varsity

- Baseball - Class A
- Basketball - Class A
- Football - Class A
- Golf - Class AA

Girls Varsity

- Basketball - Class A
- Golf - Class AA
- Softball - Class A
- Volleyball - Class A

== Notable alumni ==
- Trey McGough, baseball player
