= Westmont Hilltop School District =

School district in Pennsylvania, U.S.

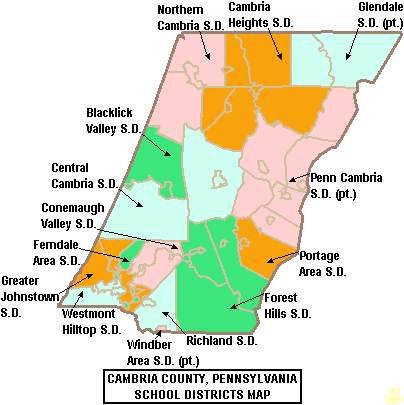

Location
- Johnstown, Pennsylvania; United States

District information
- Type: Public
- Motto: Scientia fons Veritatis "Knowledge is the Source of Truth" (English translation)
- Grades: K–12
- Established: 1919

Students and staff
- District mascot: The Hilltoppers
- Colors: Red and gray

Other information
- Website: www.whsd.org

The Westmont Hilltop School District is a small public school district located in Cambria County, Pennsylvania. The WHSD encompasses approximately 15 square miles (39 km^{2}). It serves the communities of: Upper Yoder Township, Westmont Borough, and Southmont Borough in the western suburbs of Johnstown, Pennsylvania. According to 2000 federal census data, it served a resident population of 13,647. By 2010, the district's population declined to 12,898 people. The educational attainment levels for the Westmont Hilltop School District population (25 years old and over) were 96.5% high school graduates and 37% college graduates. The district is one of the 500 public school districts of Pennsylvania.

According to the Pennsylvania Budget and Policy Center, 24.3% of the district's pupils lived at 185% or below the Federal Poverty level as shown by their eligibility for the federal free or reduced price school meal programs in 2012. In 2009, the district residents' per capita income was $25,374, while the median family income was $55,657. In the Commonwealth, the median family income was $49,501 and the United States median family income was $49,445, in 2010. In Cambria County, the median household income was $39,574. By 2013, the median household income in the United States rose to $52,100.

The district operates four schools: Westmont Hilltop High School, Cyber Academy, Westmont Hilltop Middle School, and Westmont Hilltop Elementary School. The Middle School houses the district administrative offices and Price Field along with a quarter-mile track surrounding Price Field. High school students may choose to attend Greater Johnstown Career and Technology Center for training in the construction and mechanical trades. The Appalachia Intermediate Unit IU8 provides the district with a wide variety of services like specialized education for disabled students and hearing, background checks for employees, state-mandated recognizing and reporting child abuse training, speech and visual disability services and professional development for staff and faculty.

== History ==
Westmont School District merged with Upper Yoder School District to form Westmont-Upper Yoder School District in 1919. The school district became its current entity when Southmont School District merged with Westmont-Upper Yoder School District in 1956, forming Westmont Hilltop School District.

== Extracurriculars ==
Westmont Hilltop School District offers a wide variety of clubs, activities and an extensive, publicly funded sports program.

=== Sports ===
The school district offers:

Varsity

Boys

- Baseball - AA
- Basketball- AA
- Cross country - A
- Football - A
- Golf - AA
- Indoor track and field - AAAA
- Soccer - A
- Swimming and diving - AA
- Tennis - AA
- Track and field - AA
- Wrestling - AA

Girls

- Basketball - AA
- Cheer - AAAA
- Cross country - AA
- Indoor track and field - AAAA
- Soccer - A
- Softball - AA
- Swimming and diving - AA
- Tennis - AA
- Track and field - AA
- Volleyball - AA

Middle school sports

Boys

- Basketball
- Cross country
- Football
- Soccer
- Track and field
- Wrestling

Girls

- Basketball
- Cross country
- Track and field
- Volleyball

According to PIAA directory July 2015

== Closures ==
In the 1960s, the Elim, Stutzman and Tioga Street Elementary Schools were closed and students transferred to the Southmont and Goucher Street Elementary Schools.

- Stutzman School was located at the NE corner of the Goucher St./Menoher Blvd. in Westmont Borough. The building was renovated into a Professional Arts Building with medical and other business offices using the space. The building is again abandoned, but a recreational area on the former schoolyard playground was still in use. The building and playground have been demolished to make way for a CVS pharmacy.
- Tioga Street School was located at the NW corner of Tioga and Colgate Streets in Westmont Borough with a playground extending on the Tioga St. side of the school. The property was demolished and several homes have been built on the site.
- Elim School on Harshberger Rd. and Elim St. in Upper Yoder Township now is a field.
- In 1977 Southmont School was closed and Goucher Street, the only remaining elementary, was renamed Westmont Hilltop Elementary School. The Southmont School was renovated into an apartment/condo complex.
- In 2016, Westmont Hilltop Elementary school closed down due to mold being found. As of 2023, the school has been demolished. Westmont Hilltop Middle School was also closed and demolished to make way for the new elementary school, which was completed in 2017.
