= Westmont Hilltop High School =

Public school in Pennsylvania, United States

Coordinates: 40.3177°N 78.9783°W

Location
- 200 Fair Oaks Drive; Johnstown; Pennsylvania 15905; United States

Information
- Type: Public, secondary
- Motto: Scientia fons Veritatis "Knowledge is the Source of Truth" (English translation)
- Established: 1919
- School district: District VI
- Principal: William Aurandt>
- Staff: 48.14 (FTE)
- Grades: 7–12
- Enrollment: 708 (2023–2024)
- Student to teacher ratio: 14.71
- Colors: Red and Gray
- Athletics: The Hilltoppers & The Lady Hilltoppers
- Athletics conference: Laurel Highlands Athletic Conference
- Mascot: The Hilltopper
- Website: www.whsd.org

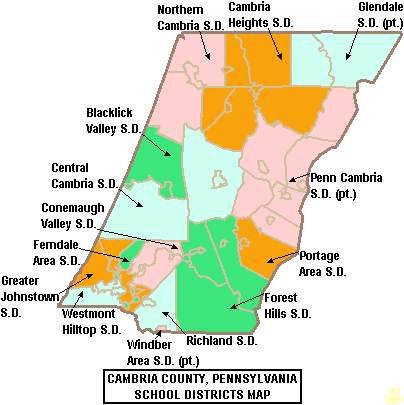
Westmont Hilltop School District region in Cambria County

Westmont Hilltop High School is a small suburban, public high school. It is the sole high school operated by the Westmont Hilltop School District. Westmont Hilltop High School is located in Upper Yoder Township, Cambria County in the western suburbs of Johnstown, Pennsylvania. The School serves the populations living in Upper Yoder Township, Westmont Borough, and Southmont Borough, Cambria County.

In the 2016–2017 school year, Westmont Hilltop High School enrollment was reported as 657 pupils in 9th through 12th grades.

WHHS students may choose to attend Greater Johnstown Career and Technology Center for training in the construction and mechanical trades. The Appalachia Intermediate Unit IU8 provides the District with a wide variety of services like specialized education for disabled students and hearing, background checks for employees, state mandated recognizing and reporting child abuse training, speech and visual disability services and professional development for staff and faculty.

== History ==
The high school was founded when Westmont School District merged with Upper Yoder School District to form Westmont-Upper Yoder School District in 1919. The high school became its current entity when Southmont School District merged with Westmont-Upper Yoder School District in 1956, forming Westmont Hilltop School District. The current high school building opened in 1961 and was renovated in 1996.

The high school was originally located on Diamond Blvd, Southmont Borough. The former high school became the Westmont Hilltop Middle School. The School District closed the Middle School in June 2016.

Grades 5-6 were moved to leased space adjacent to the Elementary School at 675 Goucher Street. Grades 7-8 were moved to the High School campus.

Work is well underway, at the Diamond Avenue site, to build a new complex and relocate the Elementary School for the 2017-18 School year.

It is intended to close the existing Elementary campus at that time.

== Alma Mater ==
The Alma Mater was written by Willard E. Ackley, the supervising principal from 1934 to 1954.

== Extracurriculars ==
Westmont Hilltop School District offers a wide variety of clubs, activities and an extensive, publicly funded sports program.

=== Athletics ===
The high school's mascot is the Hilltopper. The school's official colors are red and gray, with white and/or black often appearing in athletics uniforms. Westmont Hilltop High School is a member of the Laurel Highlands Athletic Conference for most sports. The interlocking "WH" that currently appears on the school's team uniforms and helmets was originally designed by Darren Trebel (Class of '85) in 1982 at the request of Vice Principal Jack Yoder. The design was implemented in time for the school's football team to take part in filming for "All the Right Moves" in Fall, 1983 (see Cultural References below). The modernized logo, "The Flying WH" was designed as mart of an update re-brand along with "The WH Signature Banner", "The Hilltopper's Logo", and "The Hills". All of which can be found on the WHSD district logo page.

On five occasions Westmont Hilltop sports teams have advanced to the Pennsylvania Interscholastic Athletic Association (PIAA) or equivalent state championship finals; however, no WHHS team has ever won a state championship. The first team to do so was the 2002 men's soccer team, which was defeated in sudden death double overtime. The second team was the 2003 boy's hockey team, which advanced to the state championship, but also lost by one goal. The girls's basketball team were state runners-up in 2005, 2006, and 2025.

Varsity sports:

- Boys:
  - Baseball - AA
  - Basketball- AA
  - Cross Country - A
  - Football - A
  - Golf - AA
  - Indoor Track and Field - AAAA
  - Soccer - A
  - Swimming and Diving - AA
  - Tennis - AA
  - Track and Field - AA
  - Wrestling - AA
- Girls:
  - Basketball - AA
  - Cheer - AAAA
  - Cross Country - AA
  - Indoor Track and Field - AAAA
  - Soccer (Fall) - A
  - Softball - AA
  - Swimming and Diving - AA
  - Girls' Tennis - AA
  - Track and Field - AA
  - Volleyball - AA

According to PIAA directory July 2015

=== Arts and music ===
Westmont Hilltop High School has a strong music program and consistently sends many students to participate in the PMEA District 6 and Region 3 Honors Choruses, Bands, Orchestras, and Jazz Festivals. Westmont Hilltop sends students to the All-State Festivals as well. Similarly, the school has recently sent students to the All-State Jazz Chorus Honors Festival. Many students also participate in a variety of other honors festivals. Westmont Hilltop has also sent representatives to the ACDA All-Eastern Honor Choir, and to the ACDA National Honor Choir.

The Westmont Hilltop Marching band and Indoor Percussion and Guard ensembles currently compete in the Atlantic Coast Championships yearly. The ensembles have won numerous awards and have performed in front of large crowds. Westmont Hilltop High School band appeared in the Tom Cruise movie, All the Right Moves.

Westmont Hilltop has a rich history of musical theater. The first musical was performed in 1962 and one has been performed every year since. In 2006, Westmont Hilltop's musical How to Succeed in Business Without Really Trying won many accolades from the inaugural Isaac Awards. Westmont Hilltop won the Best Production, Best Musical Number for "Coffee Break," Best Actor and Best Actress awards. Westmont Hilltop also had nominees for Best Actor in Supporting Role and Best Actress in Supporting Role. In 2007, Westmont Hilltop performed a production of Guys and Dolls and won Best Actress in a Leading Role and also won an award for Best Musical Number. Westmont presented Grease in 2008, and West Side Story in 2009. Westmont Hilltop presented Anything Goes in 2010. In 2011, the program performed Godspell and in 2012, the performance was The Pirates of Penzance for the 50th annual musical. In 2013, the school performed Into the Woods. Alumni include Broadway, film and television actor Jeff Skowron.

=== Academic competition ===
Westmont Hilltop's academic teams are two of the most valued and successful teams at the school. The Scholastic quiz team consistently performs well on the local, regional, and state levels. In 2009, Westmont's Scholastic Quiz team won the local championship and then went on to win the Regional championship over Altoona. They competed in the state tournament in April 2009, losing in a close match to the eventual State Champions from Wilson High School, in the semifinal round.

The Forensics team at Westmont has gone on to Regional, State, and National tournaments in many years. In 2010, two of Westmont's competitors were regional champions in their categories, and the team won the District Championship. In 2013, the Forensics team won both District and Regional tournaments.

2013 marked the start of the Westmont's FIRST Robotics team.
