= Mountain west =

Mountain west may refer to:

- Mountain States region of the U.S.A.
- Mountain West Conference, NCAA Division I conference
- Mountain West Hockey League, of the Western U.S.A.
- Mountain West Athletic Conference, former U.S. women's collegiate athletics conference
- Mountain West Conference Tournament (disambiguation)

== See also ==
- Mount West, Antarctica
- West Mountain (disambiguation)
- Westmont (disambiguation)
- Westmount (disambiguation)
- Mountain (disambiguation)
- West (disambiguation)
