= Ferndale High School =

Ferndale High School is the name of several high schools in the United States:

- Ferndale Area Junior/Senior High School in Johnstown, Pennsylvania
- Ferndale High School (California) in Ferndale, California
- Ferndale High School (Washington)
- Ferndale High School (Michigan)

There is also the fictitious:

- Ferndale High School in the New Zealand television series Shortland Street
