= Brownstown, Pennsylvania =

Brownstown is the name of more than one place in the U.S. state of Pennsylvania:

- Brownstown, Armstrong County, Pennsylvania
- Brownstown, Cambria County, Pennsylvania
- Brownstown, Fayette County, Pennsylvania
- Brownstown, Lancaster County, Pennsylvania
