= Westmont High School =

Westmont High School may refer to several schools in the United States:

- Westmont High School (California)
- Westmont High School (Westmont, Illinois)
- Westmont Hilltop High School, Pennsylvania

== See also ==
- Westmount High School, Westmount, Quebec, Canada
