= Elim, Pennsylvania =

Unincorporated community in Pennsylvania, US

- Census-designated place
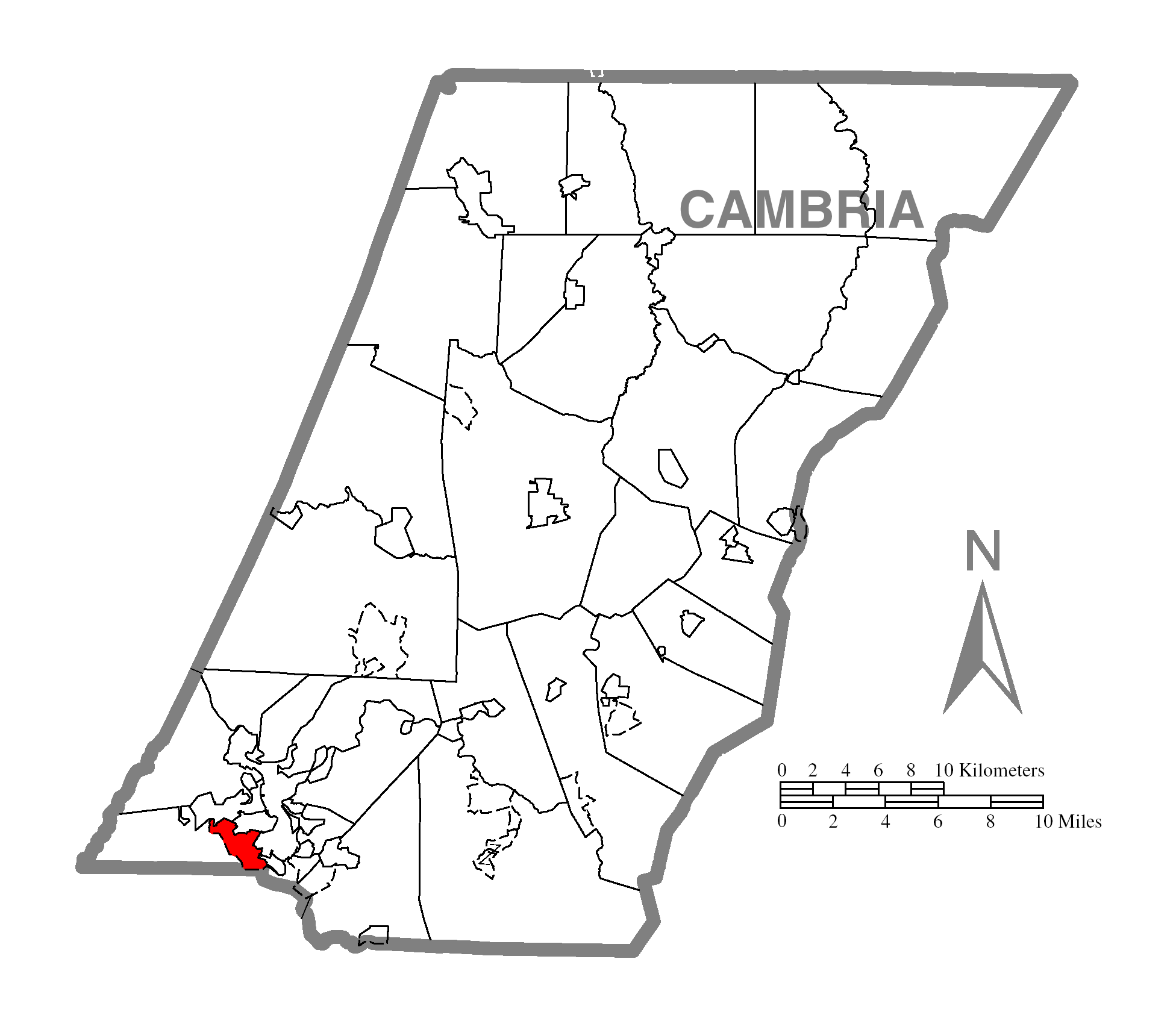
- Location within Cambria County

- Location within the U.S. state of Pennsylvania Elim (the United States)
- Coordinates: 40°17′57″N 78°56′24″W
- Country: United States
- State: Pennsylvania
- County: Cambria
- Township: Upper Yoder

Area
  - Total: 2.03 sq mi (5.25 km^{2})
  - Land: 1.99 sq mi (5.16 km^{2})
  - Water: 0.031 sq mi (0.08 km^{2})
- Elevation: 1,657 ft (505 m)

Population (2020)
  - Total: 3,364
  - Density: 1,687.1/sq mi (651.38/km^{2})
- Time zone: UTC-5 (Eastern (EST))
  - Summer (DST): UTC-4 (EDT)
- ZIP code: 15905
- Area code: 814
- FIPS code: 42-22976
- GNIS feature ID: 1867488

Elim is an unincorporated community and census-designated place (CDP) in Upper Yoder Township, Pennsylvania, United States. The population was 3,727 at the 2010 census, down from 4,175 at the 2000 census.

== Geography ==
Elim is located in southwestern Cambria County at 40°17′57″N 78°56′24″W (40.299124, -78.939873), in the eastern part of Upper Yoder Township. It is bordered by Westmont and Southmont to the north and by Ferndale and the city of Johnstown to the east. Elim is situated on heights rising more than 500 feet (150 m) above the valley of the Stonycreek River.

According to the United States Census Bureau, the Elim CDP has a total area of 2.02 square miles (5.24 km^{2}), of which 1.99 square miles (5.16 km^{2}) is land and 0.03 square miles (0.08 km^{2}), or 1.55%, is water.

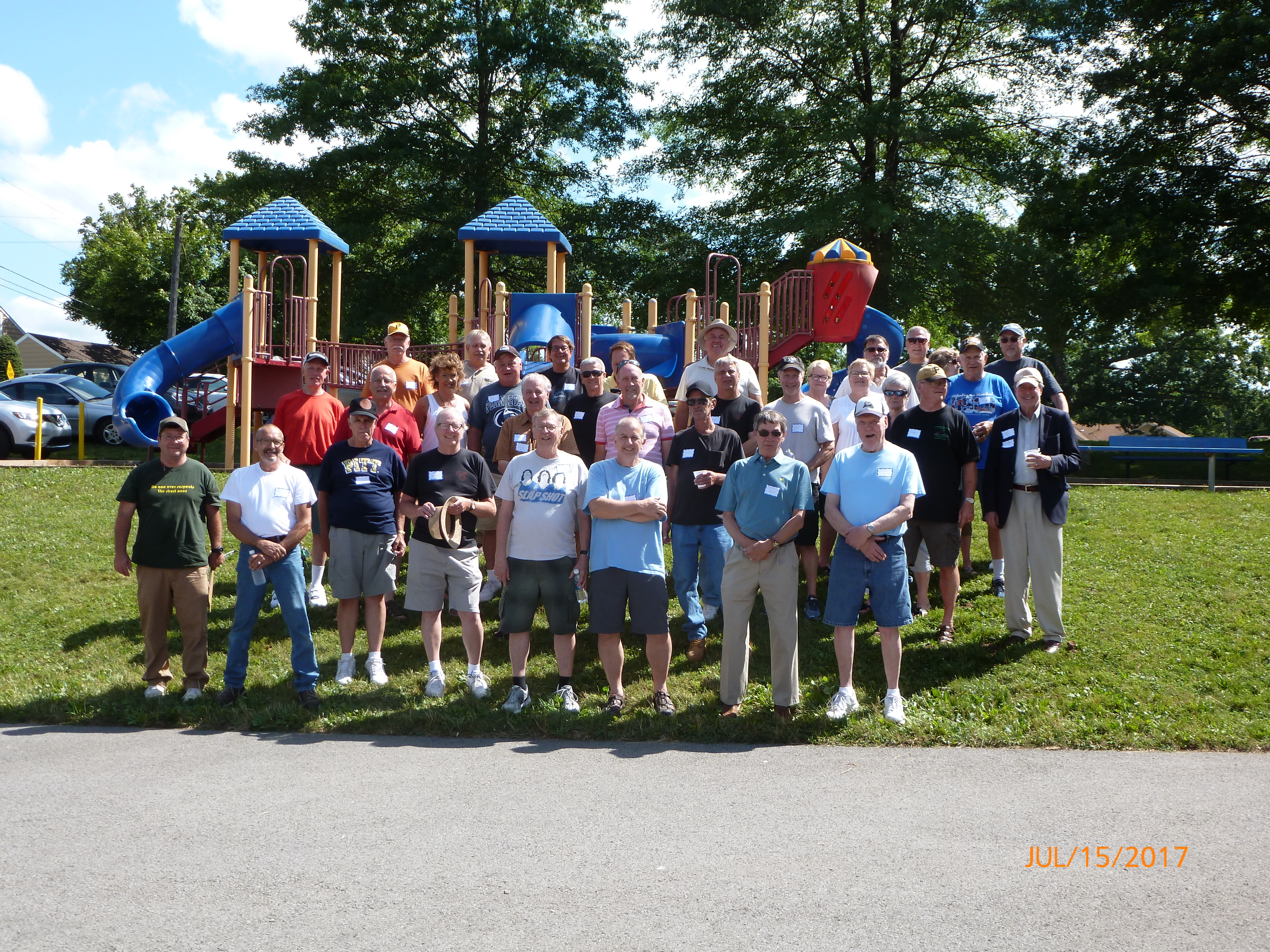
Residents

2017 reunion

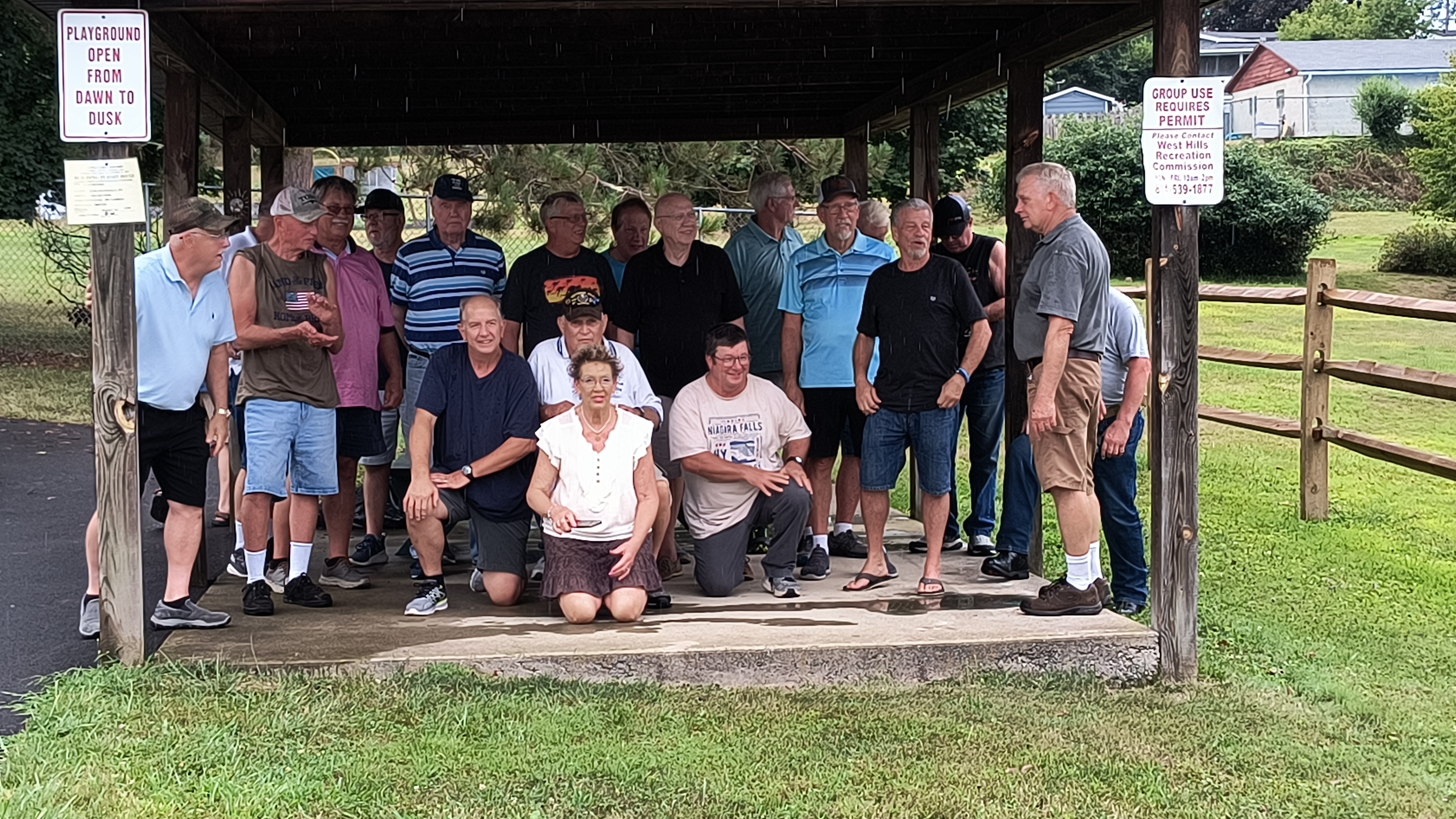
2024 Reunion_1

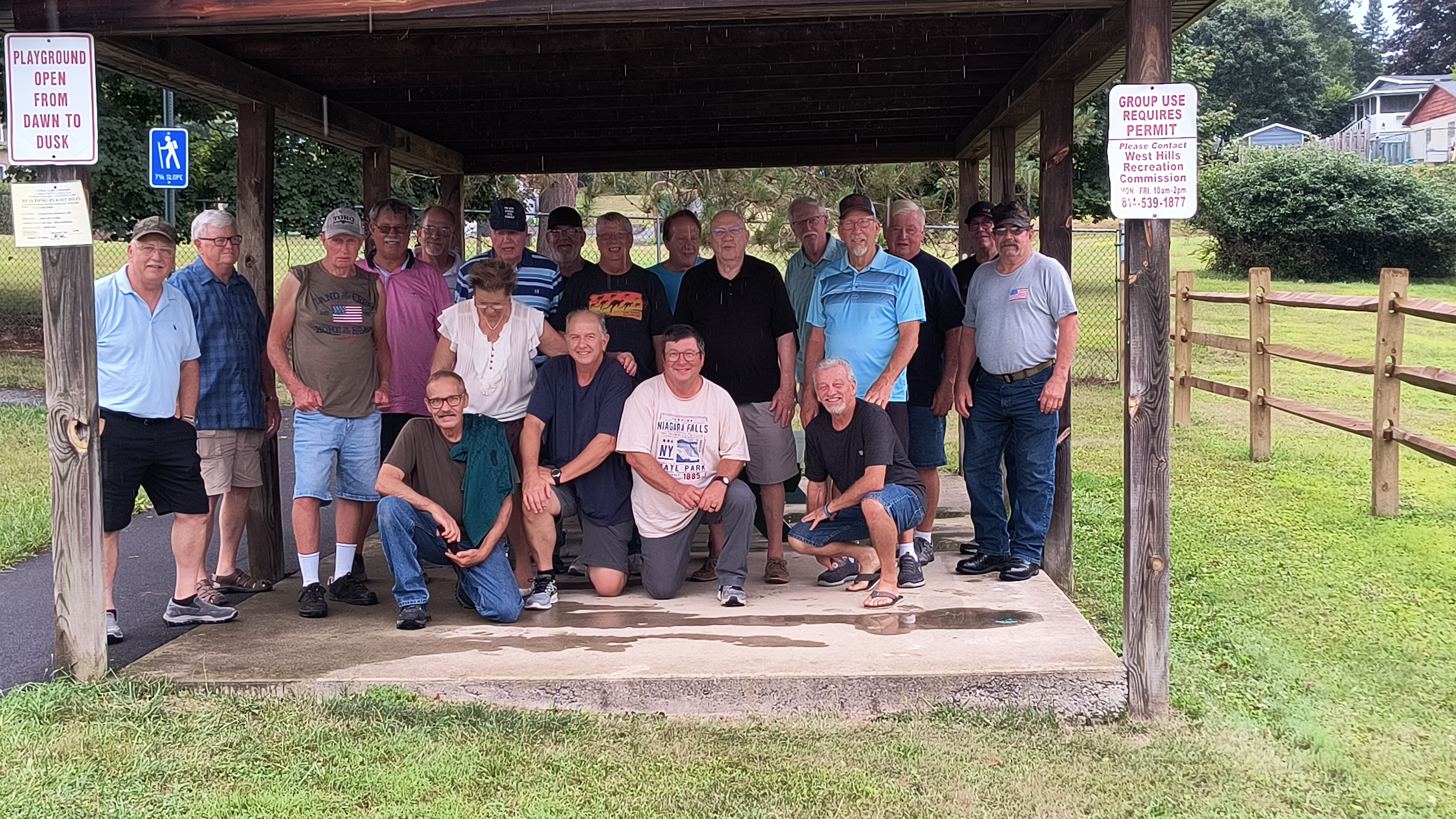
2024 Reunion_2

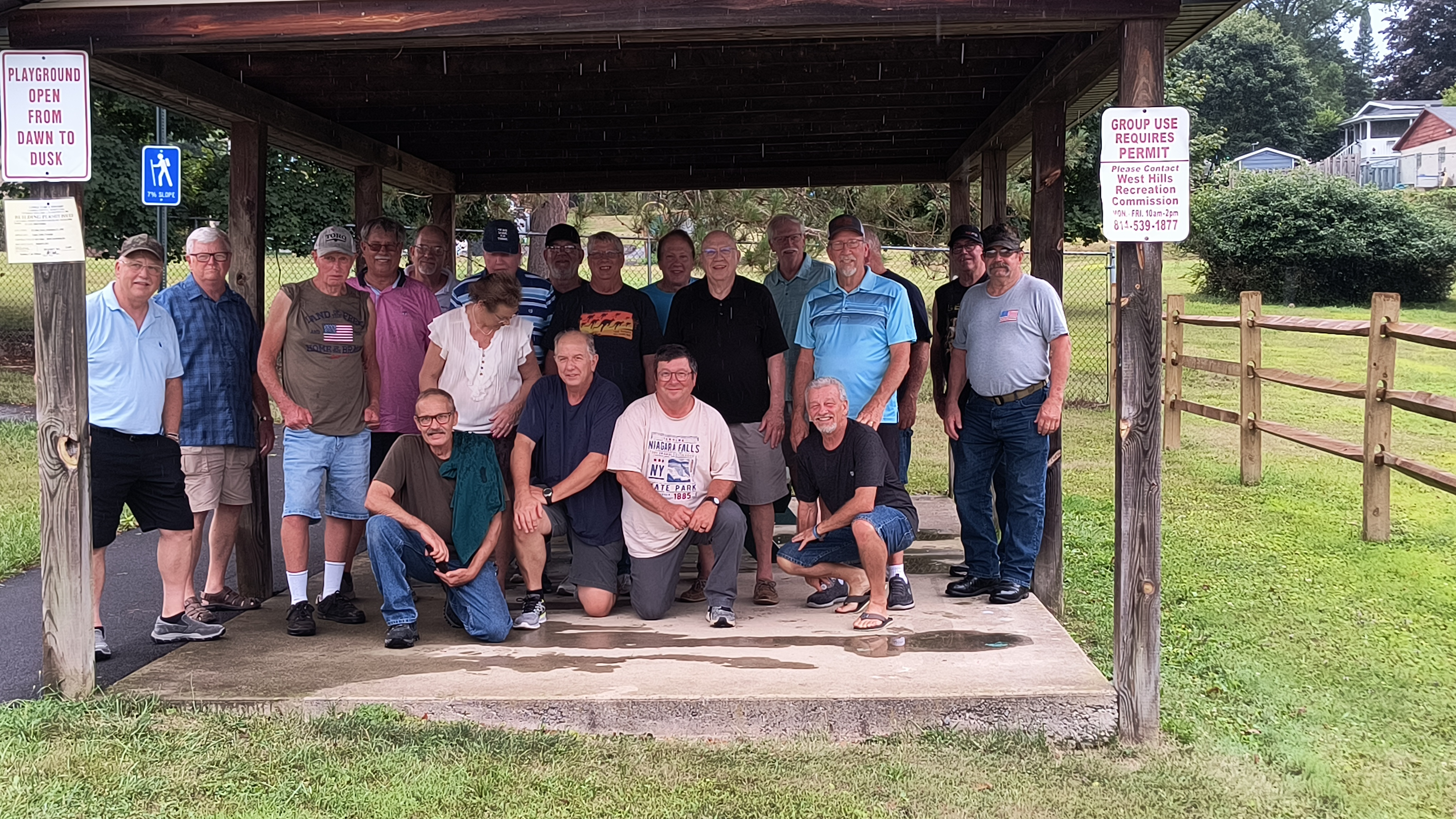
2024 Reunion_3

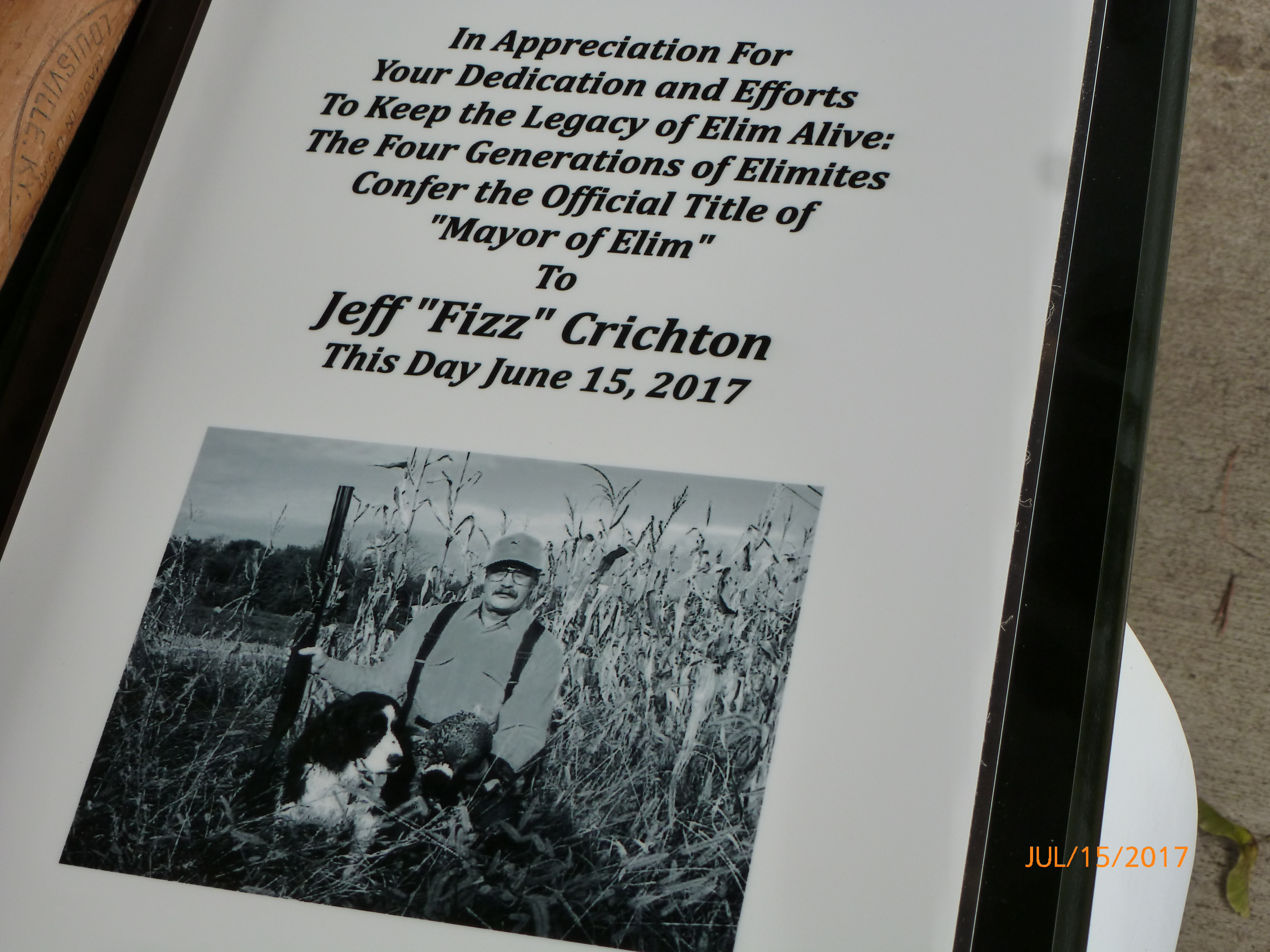

== Demographics ==
Historical population
Census	Pop.	Note	%±
2020	3,364		—
U.S. Decennial Census

=== 2020 census ===
As of the 2020 census, Elim had a population of 3,364. The median age was 51.7 years. 16.3% of residents were under the age of 18 and 30.1% of residents were 65 years of age or older. For every 100 females there were 88.5 males, and for every 100 females age 18 and over there were 86.2 males age 18 and over.

100.0% of residents lived in urban areas, while 0.0% lived in rural areas.

There were 1,468 households in Elim, of which 21.5% had children under the age of 18 living in them. Of all households, 46.5% were married-couple households, 17.7% were households with a male householder and no spouse or partner present, and 29.1% were households with a female householder and no spouse or partner present. About 33.9% of all households were made up of individuals and 18.0% had someone living alone who was 65 years of age or older.

There were 1,636 housing units, of which 10.3% were vacant. The homeowner vacancy rate was 2.6% and the rental vacancy rate was 2.5%.

Racial composition as of the 2020 census
Race	Number	Percent
White	3,075	91.4%
Black or African American	63	1.9%
American Indian and Alaska Native	3	0.1%
Asian	32	1.0%
Native Hawaiian and Other Pacific Islander	0	0.0%
Some other race	23	0.7%
Two or more races	168	5.0%
Hispanic or Latino (of any race)	76	2.3%

=== 2000 census ===
As of the census of 2000, there were 4,175 people, 1,580 households, and 1,072 families living in the CDP. The population density was 2,082.5 inhabitants per square mile (804.1/km^{2}). There were 1,669 housing units at an average density of 832.5 per square mile (321.4/km^{2}). The racial makeup of the CDP was 98.11% White, 0.79% African American, 0.10% Native American, 0.55% Asian, 0.07% Pacific Islander, 0.10% from other races, and 0.29% from two or more races. Hispanic or Latino of any race were 0.35% of the population.

There were 1,580 households, out of which 23.6% had children under the age of 18 living with them, 57.2% were married couples living together, 7.7% had a female householder with no husband present, and 32.1% were non-families. 29.1% of all households were made up of individuals, and 16.3% had someone living alone who was 65 years of age or older. The average household size was 2.26 and the average family size was 2.79.

In the CDP, the population was spread out, with 16.6% under the age of 18, 8.8% from 18 to 24, 23.4% from 25 to 44, 23.3% from 45 to 64, and 27.9% who were 65 years of age or older. The median age was 46 years. For every 100 females, there were 87.8 males. For every 100 females age 18 and over, there were 84.8 males.

The median income for a household in the CDP was $36,484, and the median income for a family was $48,496. Males had a median income of $30,794 versus $27,188 for females. The per capita income for the CDP was $18,345. About 6.8% of families and 7.7% of the population were below the poverty line, including 9.3% of those under age 18 and 9.3% of those age 65 or over.
