= West Mountain =

West Mountain may refer to:

- West Mountain (Albany County, New York), a mountain
- West Mountain (Hamilton County, New York), a mountain
- West Mountain (ski area), Queensbury, New York
- West Mountain, Connecticut, a census-designated place in Ridgefield, Connecticut
  - West Mountain Historic District
- West Mountain (Utah County, Utah)
  - West Mountain, Utah, a census-designated place
- West Mountain, a spur peak of Smith Mountain (Taconic Mountains) in western Massachusetts

== See also ==
- Mount West, Antarctica
- Mountain west (disambiguation)
- Westmont (disambiguation)
- Westmount (disambiguation)
