= Eloy Jiménez =

Dominican baseball player (born 1996)

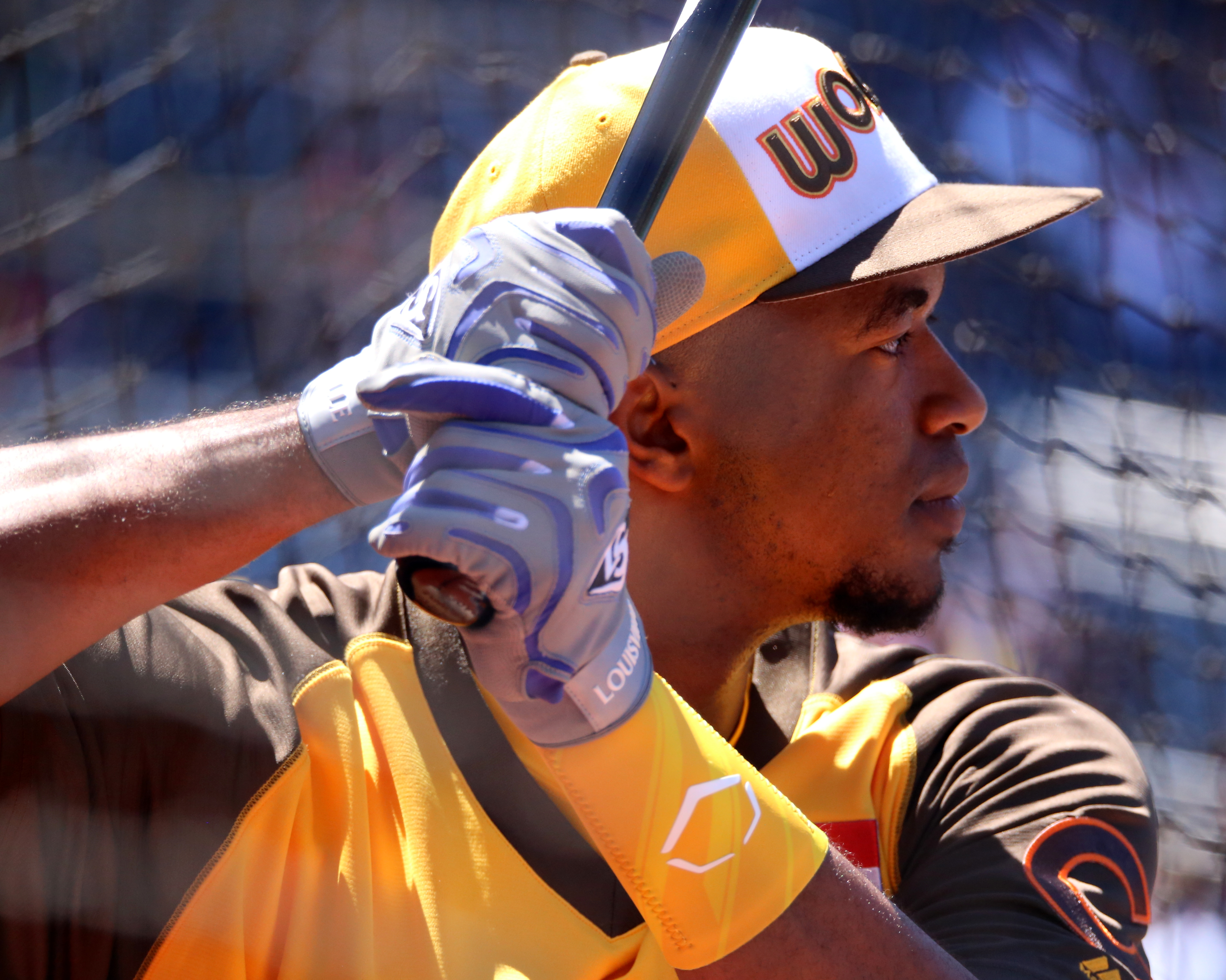
- Jiménez at the 2016 All-Star Futures Game

Free agent
- Designated hitter / Outfielder
- Born: November 27, 1996 (age 29); Santo Domingo, Dominican Republic
- Bats: Right Throws: Right

MLB debut
- March 28, 2019, for the Chicago White Sox

MLB statistics (through 2026 season)
- Batting average: .269
- Home runs: 95
- Runs batted in: 301
- Stats at Baseball Reference

Teams
- Chicago White Sox (2019–2024); Baltimore Orioles (2024); Toronto Blue Jays (2026)

Career highlights and awards
- Silver Slugger Award (2020)

Eloy Arturo Jiménez Solano (born November 27, 1996) is a Dominican professional baseball designated hitter and outfielder who is a free agent. He has previously played in Major League Baseball (MLB) for the Chicago White Sox, Baltimore Orioles, and Toronto Blue Jays. Jiménez signed with the Chicago Cubs in 2013 as an international free agent and was traded to the White Sox in 2017. He made his MLB debut in 2019 with the White Sox and won the Silver Slugger Award in 2020.

== Career ==
=== Chicago Cubs ===
Jiménez was considered the top international free agent for 2013. MLB.com called him as a five-tool player, noting that during workouts he impressed scouts with his intelligence, speed, and gap-to-gap power. He signed with the Chicago Cubs in July 2013 for a $2.8 million signing bonus.

Jiménez made his professional debut in 2014 with the rookie–level Arizona League Cubs, where he was limited to just 164 plate appearances due to a shoulder injury. When healthy, he had a .268 OBP. Still, scouts remained optimistic due to his young age and physical ability. Jiménez received a promotion to short-season Single-A to start 2015 with the Eugene Emeralds. There, Jiménez fared considerably better, improving his on-base percentage to .328, and slugging seven home runs in 250 plate appearances.

Jiménez began the 2016 season with the Low-A South Bend Cubs. Jiménez spent all of 2016 with South Bend, hitting .329 with 14 home runs and 81 RBI in 112 games. After the season, the Cubs assigned Jiménez to the Mesa Solar Sox of the Arizona Fall League. Jiménez began the 2017 season with the Myrtle Beach Pelicans of the High-A Carolina League.

=== Chicago White Sox ===
On July 13, 2017, the Cubs traded Jiménez, Dylan Cease, Matt Rose, and Bryant Flete to the Chicago White Sox for José Quintana. The White Sox assigned him to the Winston-Salem Dash of the Carolina League, and later promoted him to the Birmingham Barons of the Double-A Southern League. In 89 total games between Myrtle Beach, Winston-Salem and Birmingham, he batted .312 with 19 home runs, 65 RBI, and a .947 OPS. The White Sox added Jiménez to their 40-man roster after the 2017 season in order to protect him from the Rule 5 draft.

In 2018, the White Sox assigned Jiménez to Double-A Birmingham, though he missed the end of spring training with a knee injury and the beginning of the regular season with a pectoral injury. The White Sox promoted him to the Charlotte Knights of the Triple-A International League in June. In 108 total games between the two teams, he slashed .337/.384/.577 with 22 home runs and 75 RBI.

On March 22, 2019, Jiménez signed a six-year, $43 million contract with White Sox. The deal included two additional option years for the team which could bring the total value to $75 million. It was the richest contract ever for a player before his major league debut.

Jiménez was promoted to the White Sox 25-man roster for the 2019 season. On April 12, Jimenez hit his first two major league home runs off of New York Yankees pitchers Jonathan Holder and Chad Green. He was placed on the injured list on April 29 with an ankle injury. On June 18, 2019, Jiménez hit a go ahead two run home run against his former team, the Chicago Cubs, off of Pedro Strop to give the White Sox a 3–1 win. Overall in 2019, Jiménez appeared in 122 games hitting .267 with a .316 OBP and 31 Home Runs and 79 RBI. On defense in 2019, he had a -11 Defensive Runs Saved (DRS) rating, the lowest in the major leagues among left fielders. Jiménez placed fourth in Rookie of the Year voting.

In 2020, Jiménez batted .296 with a .332 OBP and 14 home runs and 41 RBI in 55 games. He won a Silver Slugger Award that season.

On March 24, 2021, Jiménez ruptured his left pectoral tendon while trying to rob Oakland Athletics catcher Sean Murphy of a home run during a spring training game. The injury required surgery, and he was expected to miss five to six months. On April 1, Jiménez was placed on the 60-day injured list. On July 26, Jiménez was activated off of the injured list to make his season debut. The following day, he hit a go-ahead three run homerun in the 8th inning off of Kyle Zimmer to give the White Sox a 5–3 win. His home run was measured at 459 feet. On August 8 and 9, Jiménez became the first player in franchise history to hit two home runs and five RBI in back-to-back games. His two home runs on August 8 came off of Chicago Cubs pitchers Zach Davies and Michael Rucker and his two homers on August 9 came off of Minnesota Twins pitcher Beau Burrows. On September 7 in a game against the Oakland Athletics at the Oakland Coliseum, Jimenez was hit in the knee in the dugout by a foul ball that was hit off of his teammate Andrew Vaughn. Jiménez left the game with a significant bone bruise. In 2021, Jiménez hit .249 with a .303 OBP in 55 games with 10 home runs and 37 RBI.

In a series against the Twins on April 23, 2022, Jiménez suffered a hamstring strain while attempting to beat a throw to first base and was ruled out for 6–8 weeks. On July 6, he was activated off the injured list and homered in his second at–bat. Overall in 2022 with the White Sox, he appeared in 84 games, hitting .295/.358/.500 with 16 home runs and 54 RBI, while with Charlotte he batted .246 with two home runs and six RBI.

On May 6, 2023, Jiménez underwent an appendectomy and was placed on the injured list. He returned on May 28, earlier than expected. He played in 120 games for Chicago in 2023, slashing .272/.317/.441 with 18 home runs and 64 RBI. He made 65 appearances for the White Sox in 2024, batting .240/.297/.345 with five home runs and 16 RBI.

=== Baltimore Orioles ===
On July 30, 2024, the White Sox traded Jiménez and cash considerations to the Baltimore Orioles in exchange for Trey McGough. In 33 games for Baltimore, he slashed .232/.270/.316 with one home run and seven RBI. On November 2, the Orioles declined Jiménez's club option for 2025, opting to pay a $3 million buyout.

=== Tampa Bay Rays ===
On December 23, 2024, Jiménez signed a minor league contract with the Tampa Bay Rays. In 48 appearances split between the rookie-level Florida Complex League Rays and Triple-A Durham Bulls, he batted a combined .256/.330/.360 with three home runs, 30 RBI, and one stolen base. On July 12, 2025, Jiménez was released by the Rays organization.

=== Toronto Blue Jays ===
On August 29, 2025, Jiménez signed a minor league contract with the Toronto Blue Jays. He made six appearances for the Triple-A Buffalo Bisons, going 3-for-18 (.167) with three walks. Jiménez elected free agency following the season on November 6.

On January 11, 2026, Jiménez re-signed with the Blue Jays organization on a minor league contract. On April 12, the Blue Jays selected his contract, adding him to their active roster. He made 12 appearances for Toronto, batting .290/.343/.290 with three RBIs and three walks. On April 29, Jiménez was designated for assignment by the Blue Jays following George Springer's return from the injured list. He elected free agency after clearing waivers on May 2. Jiménez re-signed with Toronto on a minor league contract on May 22. He was released by Toronto on August 4.
