= Trey McGough =

- Pitcher
- Born: March 29, 1998 (age 28); Johnstown, Pennsylvania
- Bats: Left Throws: Left

Trey Scott McGough (born March 29, 1998) is an American professional baseball pitcher.

McGough attended Ferndale Area Junior/Senior High School and played college baseball at Mount St. Mary's University. He was selected by the Pittsburgh Pirates in the 24th round of the 2019 Major League Baseball draft.

McGough signed with the Pirates and made his professional debut with the Bristol Pirates before he was promoted to the West Virginia Black Bears. Over 18 relief appearances between the two teams, he went 3–1 with a 3.86 ERA over 32 2/3 innings. McGough did not play a game in 2020 due to the cancellation of the minor league season because of the COVID-19 pandemic. He opened the 2021 season with the Greensboro Grasshoppers and was promoted to the Altoona Curve in early June. He appeared in 24 games (19 starts) for the year, going 6–5 with a 3.19 ERA and 90 strikeouts over 130 innings. He was assigned to the Indianapolis Indians to begin the 2022 season, but pitched only 17 2/3 innings due to injury.

On December 7, 2022, McGough was claimed by the Baltimore Orioles in the minor league phase of the Rule 5 draft. For the 2023 season, he pitched 20 2/3 innings and had a 3.05 ERA. After the season, he was selected to play in the Arizona Fall League for the Mesa Solar Sox.

In 2024, McGough made 28 appearances split between the Double–A Bowie Baysox and Triple–A Norfolk Tides, compiling a 1.99 ERA with 55 strikeouts across 54 1/3 innings pitched.

On July 30, 2024, the Orioles traded McGough to the Chicago White Sox in exchange for Eloy Jiménez and cash considerations.
