= Westmount (disambiguation) =

Westmount is a suburb on the Island of Montreal, Quebec, Canada.

Westmount may also refer to:

== Places ==
- Westmount, Nova Scotia, Canada
- Westmount, Edmonton, Alberta, Canada
- Westmount Subdivision, Halifax Nova Scotia, Canada
- Westmount, London, Ontario, Canada
- Westmount Adjacent, Montreal, Quebec, Canada
- Westmount, Saskatoon, Saskatchewan, Canada

== Schools ==
- Westmount Collegiate Institute, Thornhill, Ontario, Canada
- Westmount Charter School, Calgary, Alberta, Canada
- Westmount High School, Westmount, Quebec, Canada
- Westmount Park School, Westmount, Quebec, Canada
- Westmount Secondary School, Hamilton, Ontario, Canada

== Shopping centres ==
- Westmount Mall, London, Ontario, Canada
- Westmount Centre, Edmonton, Alberta, Canada

== Other uses ==
- Westmount (provincial electoral district), a former Quebec provincial electoral district
- Westmount–Saint-Louis, a Quebec provincial electoral district
- SS Westmount, a United States Shipping Board vessel in service 1919-27
- Westmount Transit Centre, Edmonton, Alberta, Canada

== See also ==
- Mount West, Antarctica
- Westmont (disambiguation)
- West Mountain (disambiguation)
- Mountain west (disambiguation)
- Mount (disambiguation)
- West (disambiguation)
