= John Stackhouse =

John Stackhouse may refer to:

- John Stackhouse (botanist) (1742–1819), English botanist
- John Stackhouse (colonial administrator), administrator of the English East India Company
- John Stackhouse (journalist) (born 1962), Canadian journalist
- John G. Stackhouse Jr. (born 1960), Canadian scholar of religion
