= Westmont Historic District =

Historic district in Pennsylvania, United States

- U.S. National Register of Historic Places
- U.S. Historic district
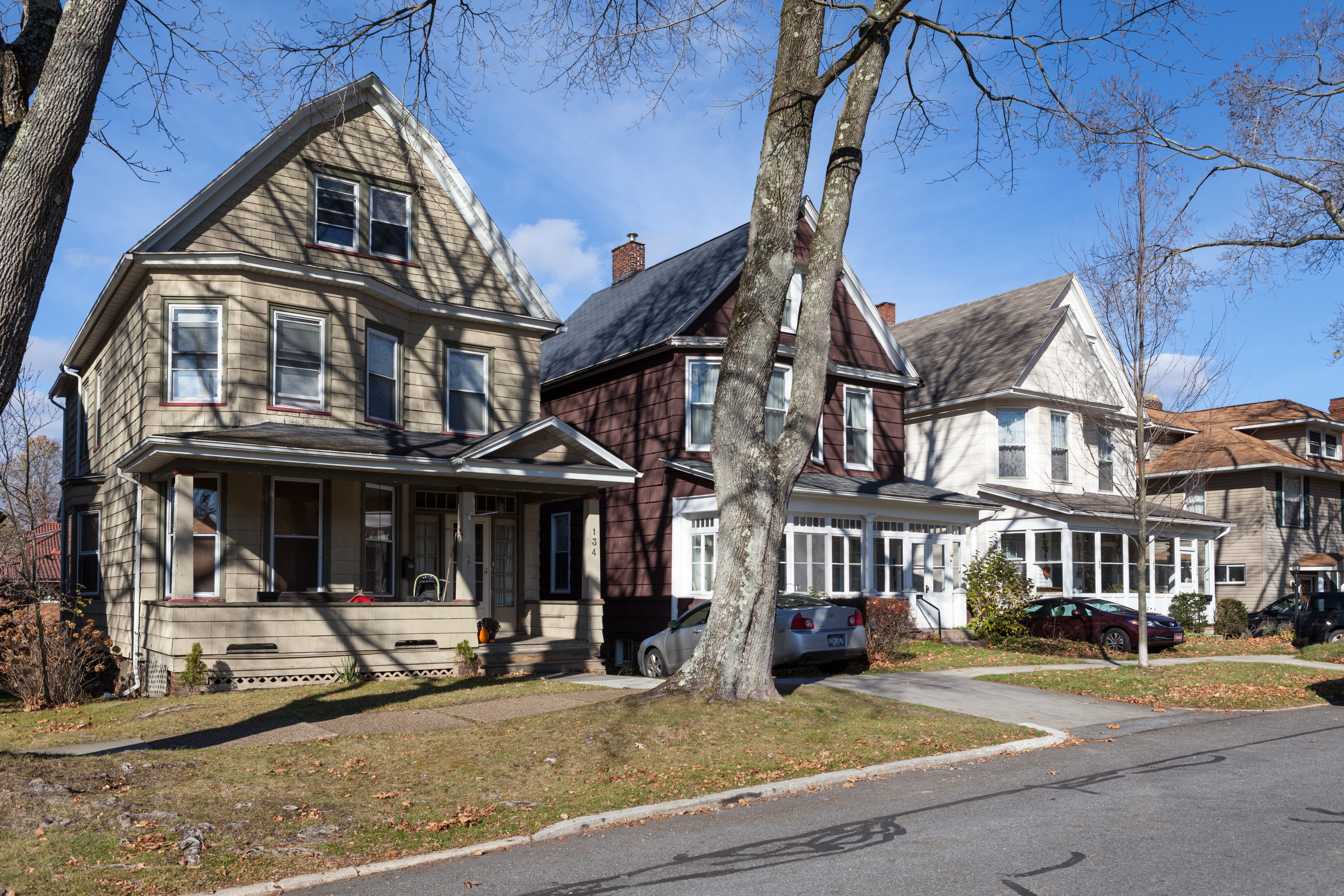
- Looking north at 134, 130, and 126 Tioga St, the earliest group of homes for middle management employees of the Cambria Iron Company c. 1901, in the district

- Location within Pennsylvania Location within the United States
- Location: Roughly bounded by Clarion St., Edgehill Dr., Blair and Wayne Sts., Diamond Blvd. and Stackhouse Park, Westmont, Pennsylvania
- Coordinates: 40°19′20″N 78°56′19″W
- Area: 86 acres (35 ha)
- Built: 1889
- Architect: Myton, Walter R.; et al.
- Architectural style: Colonial Revival, Late 19th And Early 20th Century American Movements, Queen Anne
- NRHP reference No.: 95000131
- Added to NRHP: February 24, 1995

The Westmont Historic District is a national historic district that is located in Westmont in Cambria County, Pennsylvania, United States.

It was listed on the National Register of Historic Places in 1995.

== History and architectural features ==
This district includes 430 contributing buildings and two contributing sites that are located in a predominantly residential area of eastern Westmont. The dwellings were designed in a variety of late-nineteenth and early-twentieth-century architectural styles, including Colonial Revival, Queen Anne, and Arts and Crafts.

Notable buildings include the Charles Price House (1891), the David Cohoe House, the Love House (1912), the John C. Ogden House (c. 1919), the John Schonhardt House (c. 1919), the Frank Buchanan House (1894), the Harry S. Endsley House (1895), the J. Leonard Replogle House (c. 1912), the Elmer E. Stimmel House (c. 1913), the F. J. Varner House (c. 1889), Our Mother of Sorrows Catholic Church (1924), and Westmont Presbyterian Church (1926). The contributing sites are The Mound and Indian Mound or Reservoir Park.
