= Thomas Stackhouse (antiquary) =

English antiquary and educational writer

Thomas Stackhouse (27 September 1756 – 29 January 1836) was an English antiquary and educational writer.

== Life ==
He was born in Cockermouth in 1756, son of Daniel and Margaret Stackhouse; he was a grandson of the theologian Thomas Stackhouse. He was educated by his uncle, Thomas Stackhouse (1706–1784), an educational writer.

He wrote several school textbooks, on punctuation, the Bible, astronomy and other subjects. A particular interest was investigating the remains of the early inhabitants of Britain. After walking "considerably above a hundred miles … among the barrows" near Weymouth and Dorchester in Dorset, he wrote Illustration of the Tumuli, or Ancient Barrows (1806), which was dedicated to William George Maton. He wrote Two Lectures on the Remains of Ancient Pagan Britain (1833), the result of visits to the earthworks and remains in the southern counties, ranging from Tunbridge Wells to Bath; 75 copies were printed for private distribution. He also published Views of Remarkable Druidical Rocks near Todmorton, presumably Todmorden in West Yorkshire.

Stackhouse joined the Society of Friends, and his speech at the eleventh annual meeting of the Peace Society is reported in The Herald of Peace (vol. vi. 1827).

He married Ruth Fell on 18 December 1783 in Liverpool, where he worked as a tutor, and they had three sons and two daughters: the two elder children born in Lancashire, and the three younger (born after 1787) in London. He died in Hackney on 29 January 1836, and was buried, with his wife, who had died in 1833, at Park Street burial ground, Stoke Newington.
