= Westmont station =

Westmont station may refer to:

- Westmont station (Illinois), Westmont, Illinois
- Wesmont station (NJ Transit), Wood-Ridge, New Jersey
- Westmont station (PATCO), Haddon Township, New Jersey

== See also ==
- Westmount station, Westmount, Quebec, Canada
