= Stackhouse Park =

Park in Westmont, Pennsylvania

Coordinates: 40.31677°N 78.94088°W

Stackhouse Park is a park in Westmont, Pennsylvania, a suburb of Johnstown. It has more than 277 acres with seven miles of hiking and bicycling trails.

== History and notable features ==
The wooded, deep ravine was gifted to the city of Johnstown in 1930 by Powell Stackhouse's father, in remembrance of his son, who at the time, was the president of Cambria Iron Company.

The park had been privately owned since the 1920s and was given to the city of Johnstown by Powell Stackhouse's father, the president of Cambria Iron Works, in remembrance of his son. The deed stipulates the land may never be timbered for profit and cannot be developed.

Between 1935 and 1936, Company 1397 of the federal Civilian Conservation Corps (CCC) focused its efforts on the park. The CCC constructed the pavilion buildings used for picnicking, 26 fire pits and 2-1/2-miles of knapped road. All of these sites can be seen in the park today.

The CCC was called away to other locations with the 1936 Johnstown flood. With the CCC no longer working in the park and the city of Johnsown, as its owner, having no provision for maintaining it, the park began to deteriorate. Several minor work projects were undertaken the 1970s with trail clearance and stream bank restoration.

Trailheads are located on Luzerne Street, opposite the Westmont Hilltop Elementary School, and at D Street in the West End section of Johnstown. Morley's Run, a five-mile/ten-mile race that has been annually held on the first Sunday of November since 2012, utilizes Stackhouse Park as a major portion of its race.

Stackhouse Park also features seasonal guided hikes, educational programs, and live plays throughout the year.
