= Mountain West Conference Tournament =

Mountain West Conference Tournament or Mountain West Conference Championship may refer to:

- Mountain West Conference baseball tournament, the college baseball championship tournament
- Mountain West Conference Football Championship Game, the college football championship game
- Mountain West Conference men's basketball tournament, the college basketball championship tournament
- Mountain West Conference women's basketball tournament, the college basketball championship tournament
