= Upper Yoder Township, Pennsylvania =

Township in Pennsylvania, US

Coordinates: 40°18′29″N 78°57′38″W

- Township
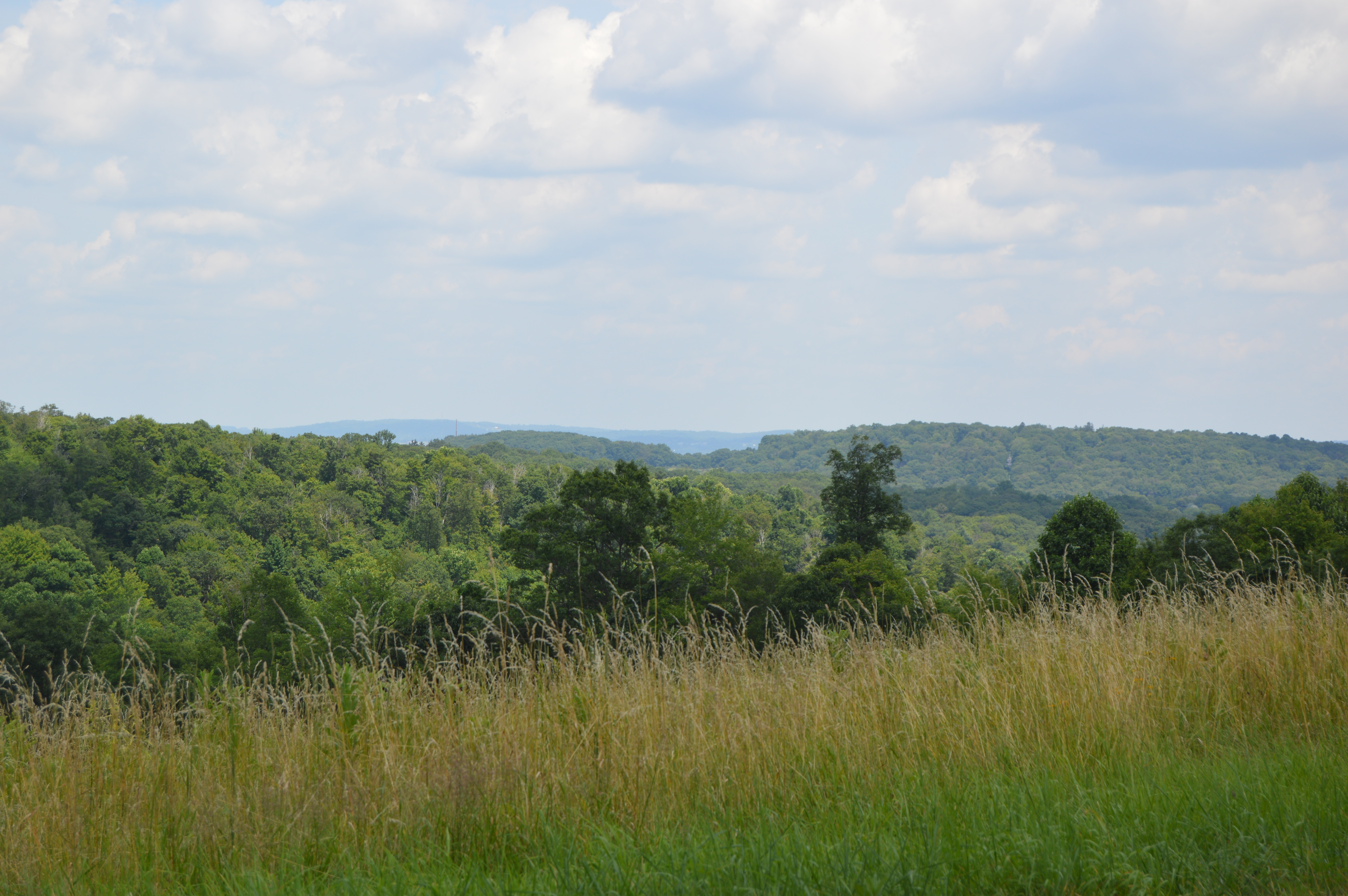
- Hill country in the township's south

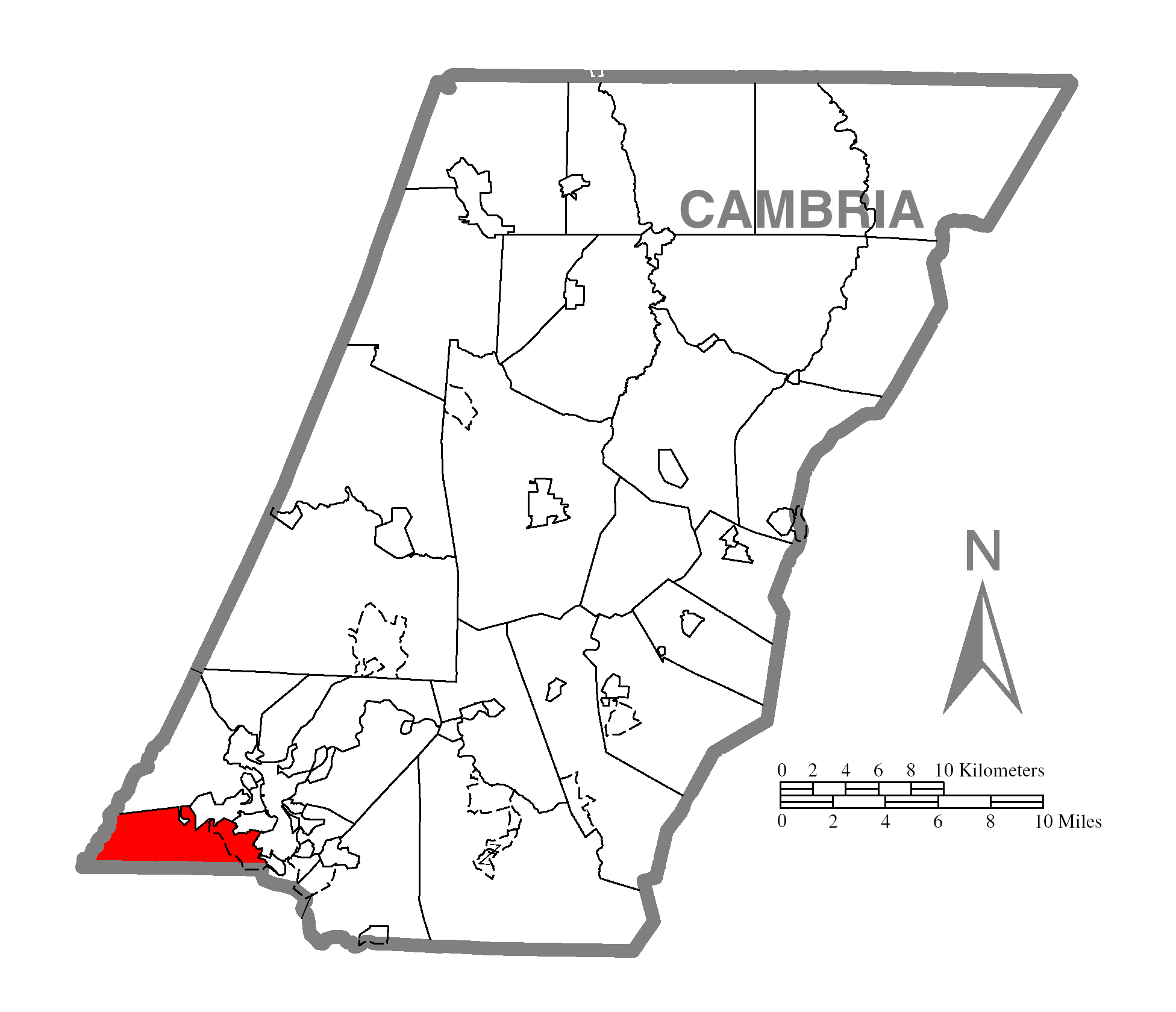
- Map of Cambria County, Pennsylvania highlighting Upper Yoder Township

- Map of Cambria County, Pennsylvania
- Country: United States
- State: Pennsylvania
- County: Cambria
- Settled: 1820
- Incorporated: 1879

Area
  - Total: 12.23 sq mi (31.67 km^{2})
  - Land: 12.20 sq mi (31.59 km^{2})
  - Water: 0.031 sq mi (0.08 km^{2})

Population (2010)
  - Total: 5,449
  - Estimate (2016): 5,198
  - Density: 426.2/sq mi (164.55/km^{2})
- Time zone: UTC-5 (Eastern (EST))
  - Summer (DST): UTC-4 (EDT)
- Area code: 814
- FIPS code: 42-021-79360
- Website: upperyodertownship.org

Upper Yoder Township is a township in Cambria County, Pennsylvania, United States. The population was 5,449 at the 2010 census. It is part of the Johnstown, Pennsylvania Metropolitan Statistical Area.

== Geography ==
The township is located in the southwestern corner of Cambria County, 5 miles (8 km) southwest of the center of Johnstown. It is bordered by Johnstown to the east and the boroughs of Westmont and Southmont to the north. Westmoreland County is on the township's western border, and Somerset County is to the south. The unincorporated community of Elim occupies the eastern end of the township.

According to the United States Census Bureau, the township has a total area of 12.2 square miles (31.7 km^{2}), of which 12.2 square miles (31.6 km^{2}) is land and 0.04 square miles (0.1 km^{2}), or 0.27%, is water.

== Demographics ==
Historical population
Census	Pop.	Note	%±
2000	5,862		—
2010	5,449		−7.0%
2016 (est.)	5,198		−4.6%
U.S. Decennial Census

As of the census of 2000, there were 5,862 people, 2,156 households, and 1,528 families residing in the township. The population density was 493.6 inhabitants per square mile (190.6/km^{2}). There were 2,275 housing units at an average density of 191.6 per square mile (74.0/km^{2}). The racial makeup of the township was 98.33% White, 0.67% African American, 0.15% Native American, 0.49% Asian, 0.05% Pacific Islander, 0.07% from other races, and 0.24% from two or more races. Hispanic or Latino of any race were 0.38% of the population.

There were 2,156 households, out of which 26.4% had children under the age of 18 living with them, 61.4% were married couples living together, 6.9% had a female householder with no husband present, and 29.1% were non-families. 26.5% of all households were made up of individuals, and 14.8% had someone living alone who was 65 years of age or older. The average household size was 2.35 and the average family size was 2.85.

In the township the population was spread out, with 18.4% under the age of 18, 7.2% from 18 to 24, 23.3% from 25 to 44, 24.0% from 45 to 64, and 27.1% who were 65 years of age or older. The median age was 46 years. For every 100 females, there were 87.6 males. For every 100 females age 18 and over, there were 83.7 males.

The median income for a household in the township was $41,504, and the median income for a family was $51,415. Males had a median income of $31,344 versus $27,468 for females. The per capita income for the township was $20,053. About 6.2% of families and 7.3% of the population were below the poverty line, including 7.4% of those under age 18 and 9.8% of those age 65 or over.
