= Middle Taylor Township, Pennsylvania =

Township in Pennsylvania, US

Coordinates: 40°22′15″N 78°54′55″W

- Township
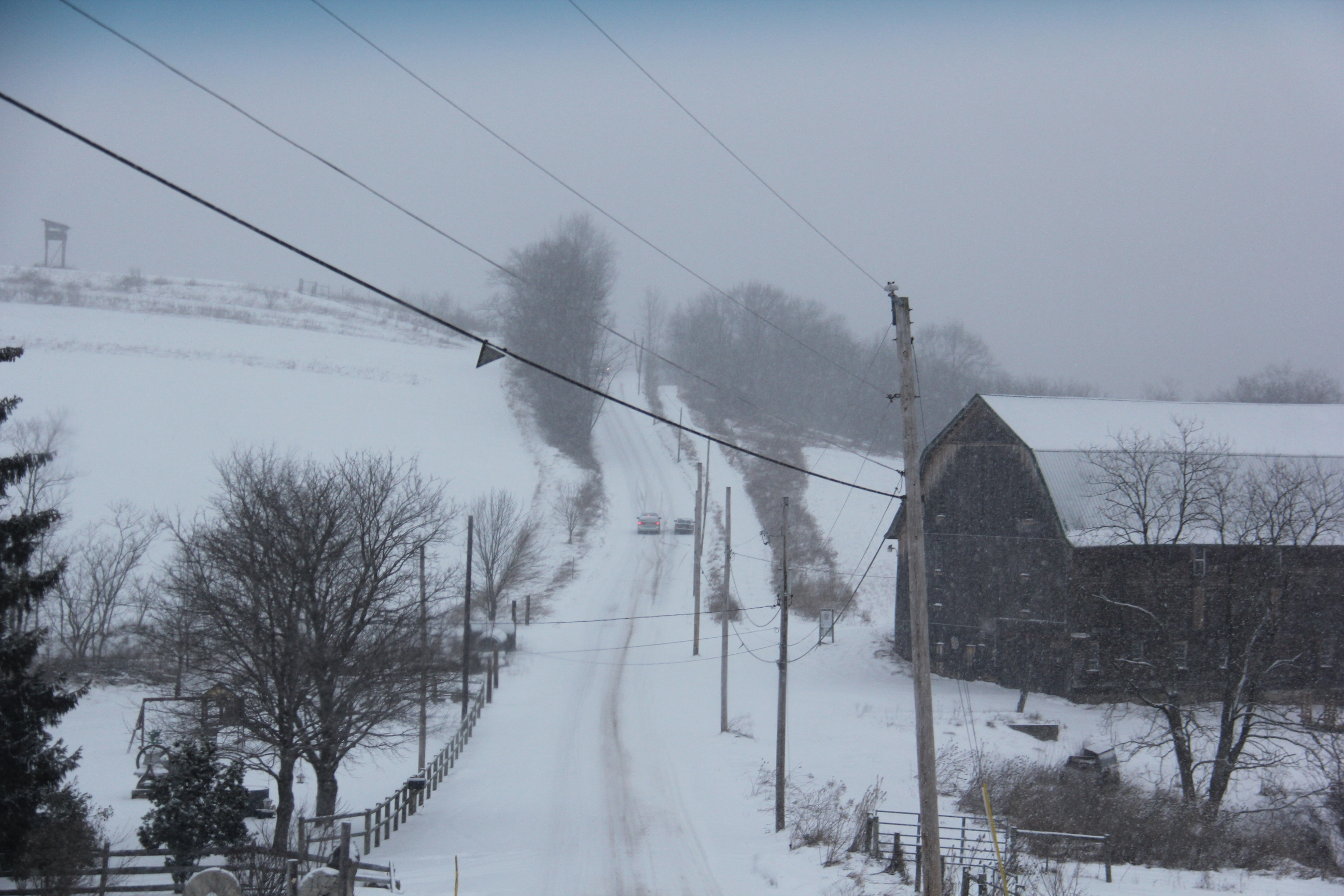
- Snowy road in Middle Taylor Township

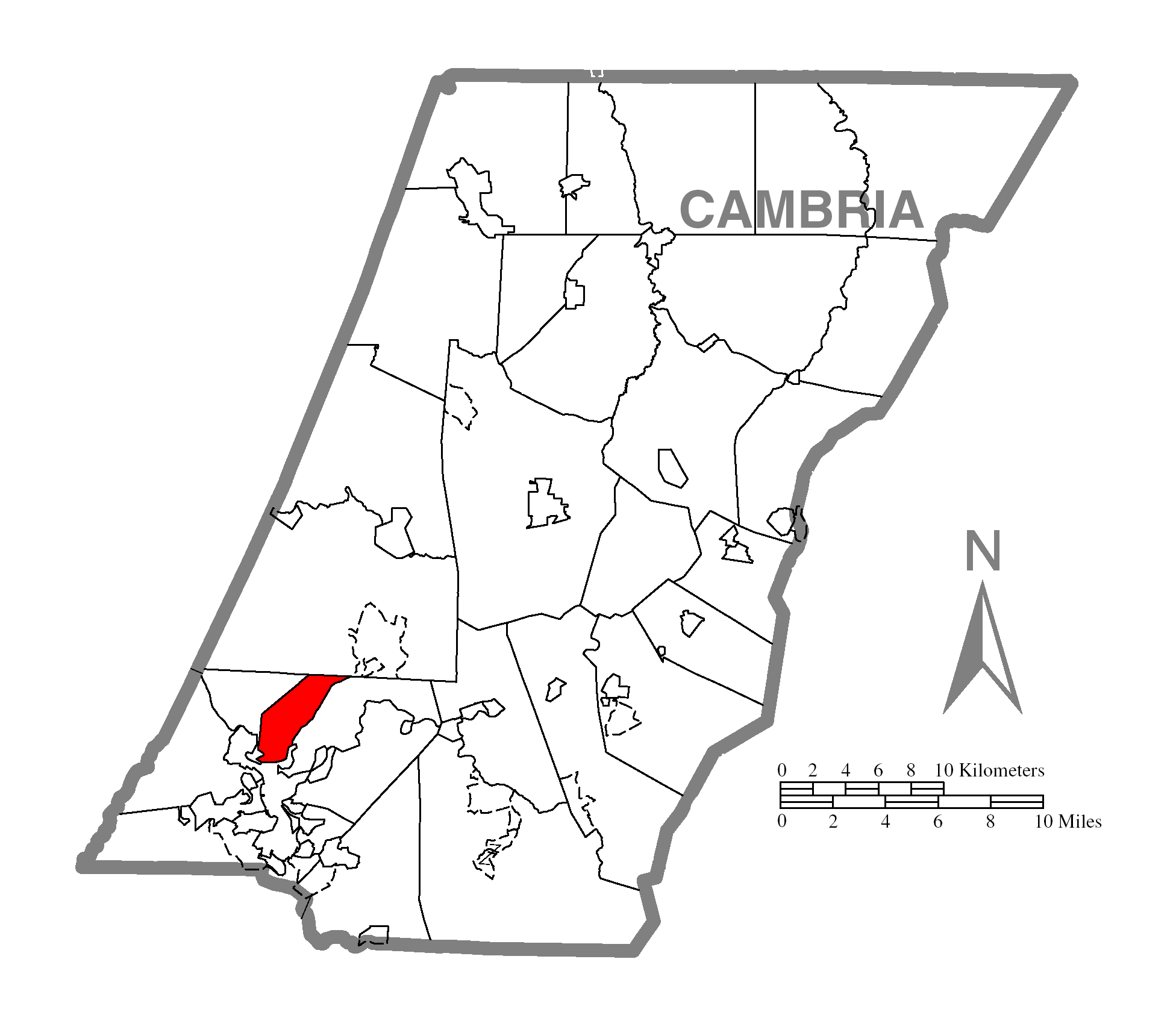
- Map of Cambria County, Pennsylvania highlighting Middle Taylor Township

- Map of Cambria County, Pennsylvania
- Country: United States
- State: Pennsylvania
- County: Cambria
- Incorporated: 1908

Area
  - Total: 4.78 sq mi (12.37 km^{2})
  - Land: 4.67 sq mi (12.10 km^{2})
  - Water: 0.10 sq mi (0.27 km^{2})

Population (2010)
  - Total: 727
  - Estimate (2016): 687
  - Density: 147.0/sq mi (56.77/km^{2})
- Time zone: UTC-5 (Eastern (EST))
  - Summer (DST): UTC-4 (EDT)
- Area code: 814
- FIPS code: 42-021-49104

Middle Taylor Township is a township that is located in Cambria County, Pennsylvania, United States. The population was 727 as of the 2010 census. It is part of the Johnstown, Pennsylvania Metropolitan Statistical Area.

== Geography ==
The township is located in southwestern Cambria County and is bordered to the south by the city of Johnstown. West Taylor Township is to the west, East Taylor Township is to the east, and Jackson Township is to the north. The unincorporated community of Pleasant Hill is situated in the southern part of the township, 3.5 miles (5.6 km) north of downtown Johnstown.

According to the United States Census Bureau, Middle Taylor Township has a total area of 4.8 square miles (12.4 km^{2}), of which 4.7 square miles (12.1 km^{2}) is land and 0.1 square miles (0.3 km^{2}), or 2.17%, is water.

== Demographics ==
Historical population
Census	Pop.	Note	%±
2000	792		—
2010	727		−8.2%
2016 (est.)	687		−5.5%
U.S. Decennial Census

As of the census of 2000, there were 792 people, 317 households, and 231 families residing in the township.

The population density was 164.6 inhabitants per square mile (63.6/km^{2}). There were 331 housing units at an average density of 68.8 per square mile (26.6/km^{2}).

The racial makeup of the township was 99.12% White, 0.51% African American, 0.13% Asian, and 0.25% from two or more races. Hispanic or Latino of any race were 1.52% of the population.

There were 317 households, out of which 23.7% had children under the age of eighteen living with them; 67.2% were married couples living together, 4.7% had a female householder with no husband present, and 27.1% were non-families. 22.7% of all households were made up of individuals, and 12.0% had someone living alone who was sixty-five years of age or older.

The average household size was 2.50 and the average family size was 2.98.

Within the township, the population was spread out, with 18.8% of residents who were under the age of eighteen, 7.3% who were aged eighteen to twenty-four, 23.9% who were aged twenty-five to forty-four, 30.2% from who were aged forty-five to sixty-four, and 19.8% who were sixty-five years of age or older. The median age was forty-five years.

For every one hundred females, there were 99.5 males. For every one hundred females who were aged eighteen or older, there were 100.3 males.

The median income for a household in the township was $33,482, and the median income for a family was $37,000. Males had a median income of $31,490 compared with that of $22,895 for females.

The per capita income for the township was $15,459.

Approximately 9.1% of families and 8.5% of the population were living below the poverty line, including 9.7% of those who were under the age of eighteen and 17.4% of those who were aged sixty-five or older.
