= Ferndale, Pennsylvania =

Borough in Pennsylvania, US

- Borough
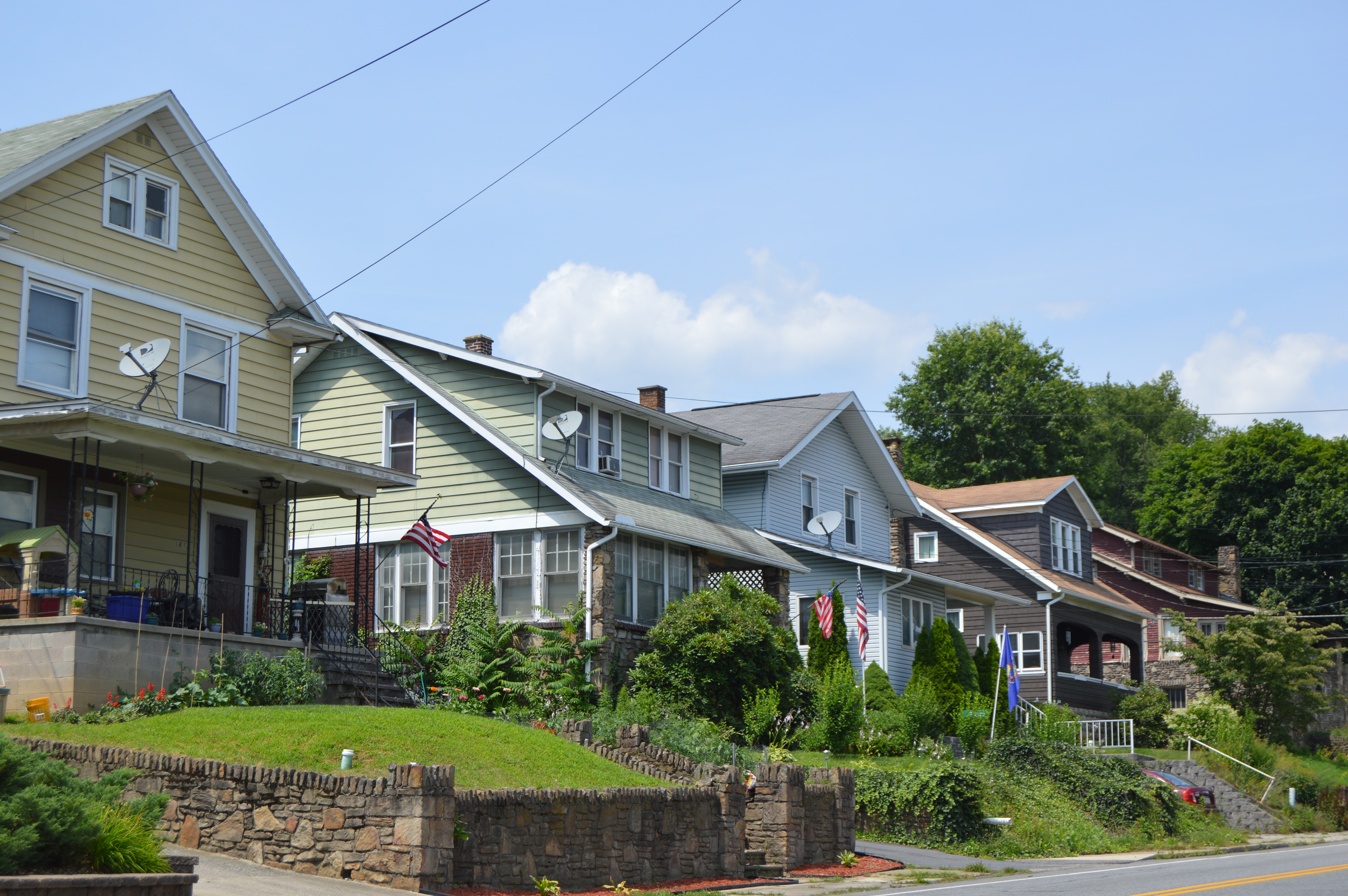
- Houses on Franklin Street

- Location of Ferndale in Cambria County, Pennsylvania.
- Coordinates: 40°17′17″N 78°55′05″W
- Country: United States
- State: Pennsylvania
- County: Cambria
- Settled: 1785
- Incorporated: 1896

Government
  - Type: Borough council

Area
  - Total: 0.42 sq mi (1.08 km^{2})
  - Land: 0.39 sq mi (1.01 km^{2})
  - Water: 0.027 sq mi (0.07 km^{2})
- Elevation: 1,270 ft (390 m)

Population (2020)
  - Total: 1,547
  - Density: 3,979.0/sq mi (1,536.29/km^{2})
- Time zone: UTC-5 (Eastern (EST))
  - Summer (DST): UTC-4 (EDT)
- ZIP code: 15905
- Area code: 814
- FIPS code: 42-25680
- GNIS feature ID: 1215020
- Website: www.ferndaleborough.com

Ferndale is a borough in Cambria County, Pennsylvania, United States. It is part of the Johnstown, Pennsylvania Metropolitan Statistical Area. As of the 2020 census, Ferndale had a population of 1,547.

== Geography ==
A view of Ferndale

Ferndale is located in southwestern Cambria County at 40°17′17″N 78°55′5″W (40.287974, -78.918091). It is bordered to the north by the city of Johnstown, to the west by the unincorporated community of Elim, and to the east and south by the Stonycreek River, across which to the south is Riverside.

According to the United States Census Bureau, Ferndale has a total area of 0.41 square miles (1.07 km^{2}), of which 0.39 square miles (1.01 km^{2}) is land and 0.02 square miles (0.06 km^{2}), or 6.00%, is water.

== Demographics ==
Historical population
Census	Pop.	Note	%±
1900	224		—
1910	514		129.5%
1920	1,450		182.1%
1930	2,742		89.1%
1940	2,740		−0.1%
1950	2,619		−4.4%
1960	2,717		3.7%
1970	2,482		−8.6%
1980	2,204		−11.2%
1990	2,020		−8.3%
2000	1,834		−9.2%
2010	1,636		−10.8%
2020	1,547		−5.4%

As of the census of 2000, there were 1,834 people, 792 households and 521 families living in the borough. The population density was 5,198.2 inhabitants per square mile (2,007.0/km^{2}). There were 849 housing units at an average density of 2,406.3 per square mile (929.1/km^{2}). The racial makeup of the borough was 98.47% White, 1.15% African American, 0.11% Native American, 0.05% Asian, and 0.22% from two or more races. Hispanic or Latino of any race were 0.22% of the population.

There were 792 households, of which 28.4% had children under the age of 18 living with them, 52.7% were married couples living together, 10.0% had a female householder with no husband present, and 34.2% were non-families. 30.3% of all households were made up of individuals, and 14.6% had someone living alone who was 65 years of age or older. The average household size was 2.32 and the average family size was 2.88.

In the borough, the population was spread out, with 21.6% under the age of 18, 7.5% from 18 to 24, 28.5% from 25 to 44, 23.8% from 45 to 64, and 18.5% who were 65 years of age or older. The median age was 40 years. For every 100 females there were 88.5 males. For every 100 females age 18 and over, there were 83.5 males.

The median income for a household in the borough was $32,617, and the median income for a family was $41,438. Males had a median income of $28,750 versus $20,000 for females. The per capita income for the borough was $25,750. About 4.1% of families and 8.9% of the population were below the poverty line, including 15.8% of those under age 18 and 8.6% of those age 65 or over.

== Transportation ==
Ferndale is located on Pennsylvania Route 403; Route 985 is nearby. The Pennsylvania Turnpike is 26 miles (42 km) to the south in Somerset.

The borough is located on a CSX rail line; the nearest passenger train service is in nearby Johnstown, as is the Johnstown-Cambria County Airport.
