= Southmont, Pennsylvania =

Borough in Pennsylvania, US

- Borough
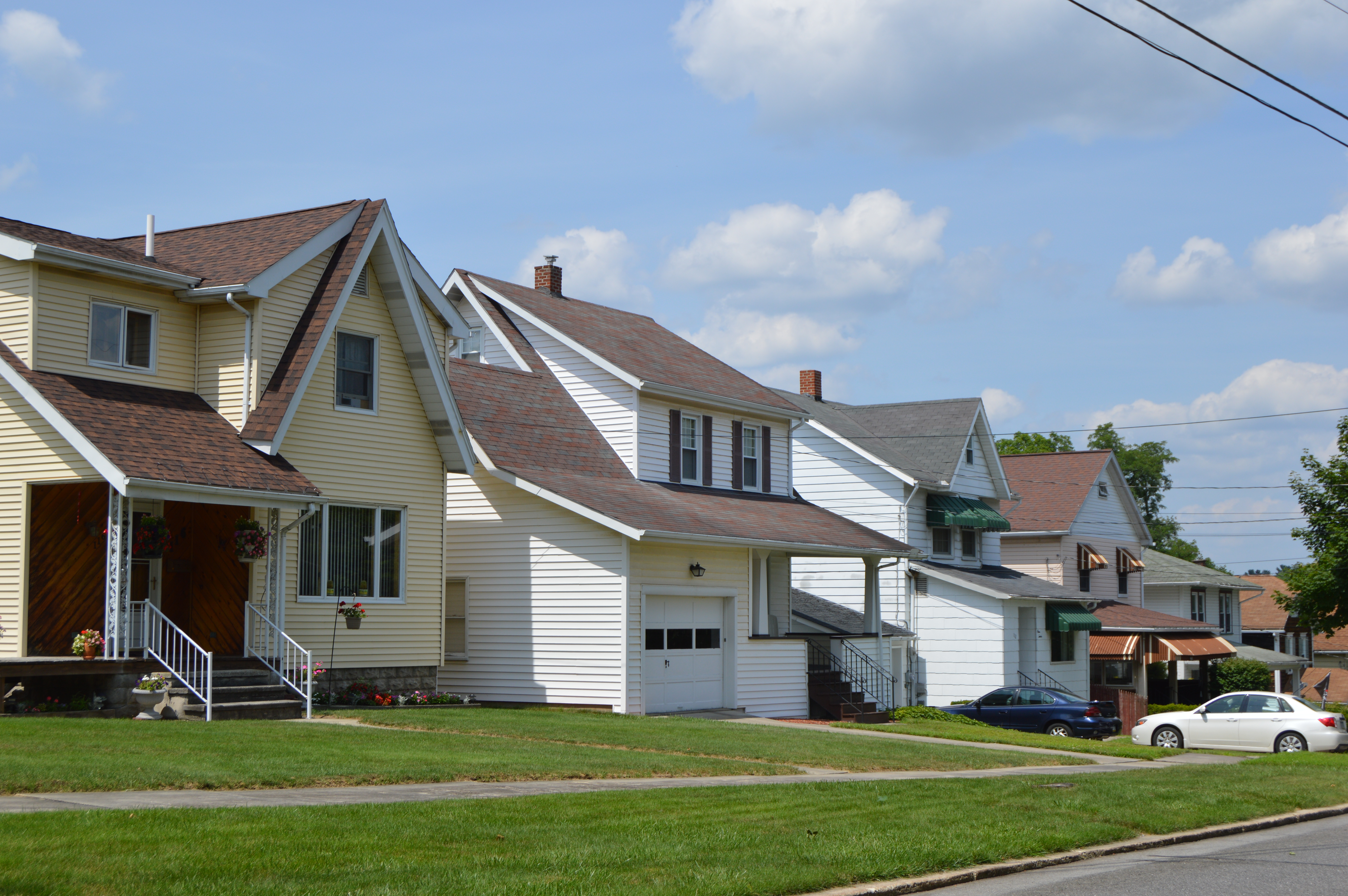
- Houses on King Street

- Location of Southmont in Cambria County, Pennsylvania.
- Coordinates: 40°18′39″N 78°56′02″W
- Country: United States
- State: Pennsylvania
- County: Cambria
- Settled: 1850
- Incorporated: 1919

Government
  - Type: Borough council

Area
  - Total: 1.05 sq mi (2.73 km^{2})
  - Land: 1.05 sq mi (2.73 km^{2})
  - Water: 0 sq mi (0.00 km^{2})
- Elevation: 1,568 ft (478 m)

Population (2020)
  - Total: 2,045
  - Density: 1,943.1/sq mi (750.25/km^{2})
- Time zone: UTC-5 (Eastern (EST))
  - Summer (DST): UTC-4 (EDT)
- Area code: 814
- FIPS code: 42-72344
- GNIS feature ID: 1215035
- Website: www.southmontborough.com

Southmont is a borough in Cambria County, Pennsylvania, United States. It is part of the Johnstown, Pennsylvania Metropolitan Statistical Area. As of the 2020 census, Southmont had a population of 2,045. It was incorporated in 1919 out of Upper Yoder Township.

== Geography ==
Southmont is located in southwestern Cambria County at 40°18′39″N 78°56′2″W (40.310874, -78.934005). It is bordered to the east by the city of Johnstown, to the north by the borough of Westmont, and to the southwest by the unincorporated community of Elim in Upper Yoder Township. Southmont is located on heights rising nearly 600 feet (180 m) above the valley of the Stonycreek River which flows through Johnstown.

According to the United States Census Bureau, the borough has a total area of 1.0 square mile (2.7 km^{2}), all land.

== Demographics ==
Historical population
Census	Pop.	Note	%±
1920	281		—
1930	1,925		585.1%
1940	2,146		11.5%
1950	2,278		6.2%
1960	2,857		25.4%
1970	2,653		−7.1%
1980	2,683		1.1%
1990	2,415		−10.0%
2000	2,262		−6.3%
2010	2,284		1.0%
2020	2,045		−10.5%
U.S. Decennial Census

As of the census of 2000, there were 2,262 people, 965 households, and 660 families residing in the borough. The population density was 2,151.1 inhabitants per square mile (830.5/km^{2}). There were 1,021 housing units at an average density of 970.9 per square mile (374.9/km^{2}). The racial makeup of the borough was 98.28% White, 0.22% African American, 0.04% Native American, 0.44% Asian, 0.13% from other races, and 0.88% from two or more races. Hispanic or Latino of any race were 0.49% of the population.

There were 965 households, out of which 27.2% had children under the age of 18 living with them, 58.1% were married couples living together, 8.7% had a female householder with no husband present, and 31.6% were non-families. 29.5% of all households were made up of individuals, and 13.6% had someone living alone who was 65 years of age or older. The average household size was 2.32 and the average family size was 2.87.

In the borough the population was spread out, with 22.0% under the age of 18, 4.2% from 18 to 24, 25.5% from 25 to 44, 27.4% from 45 to 64, and 20.9% who were 65 years of age or older. The median age was 44 years. For every 100 females there were 89.3 males. For every 100 females age 18 and over, there were 87.1 males.

The median income for a household in the borough was $38,125, and the median income for a family was $49,297. Males had a median income of $36,553 versus $25,398 for females. The per capita income for the borough was $25,750. About 4.5% of families and 5.2% of the population were below the poverty line, including 7.7% of those under age 18 and 2.7% of those age 65 or over.
