= Dale, Pennsylvania =

Borough in Pennsylvania, US

- Borough
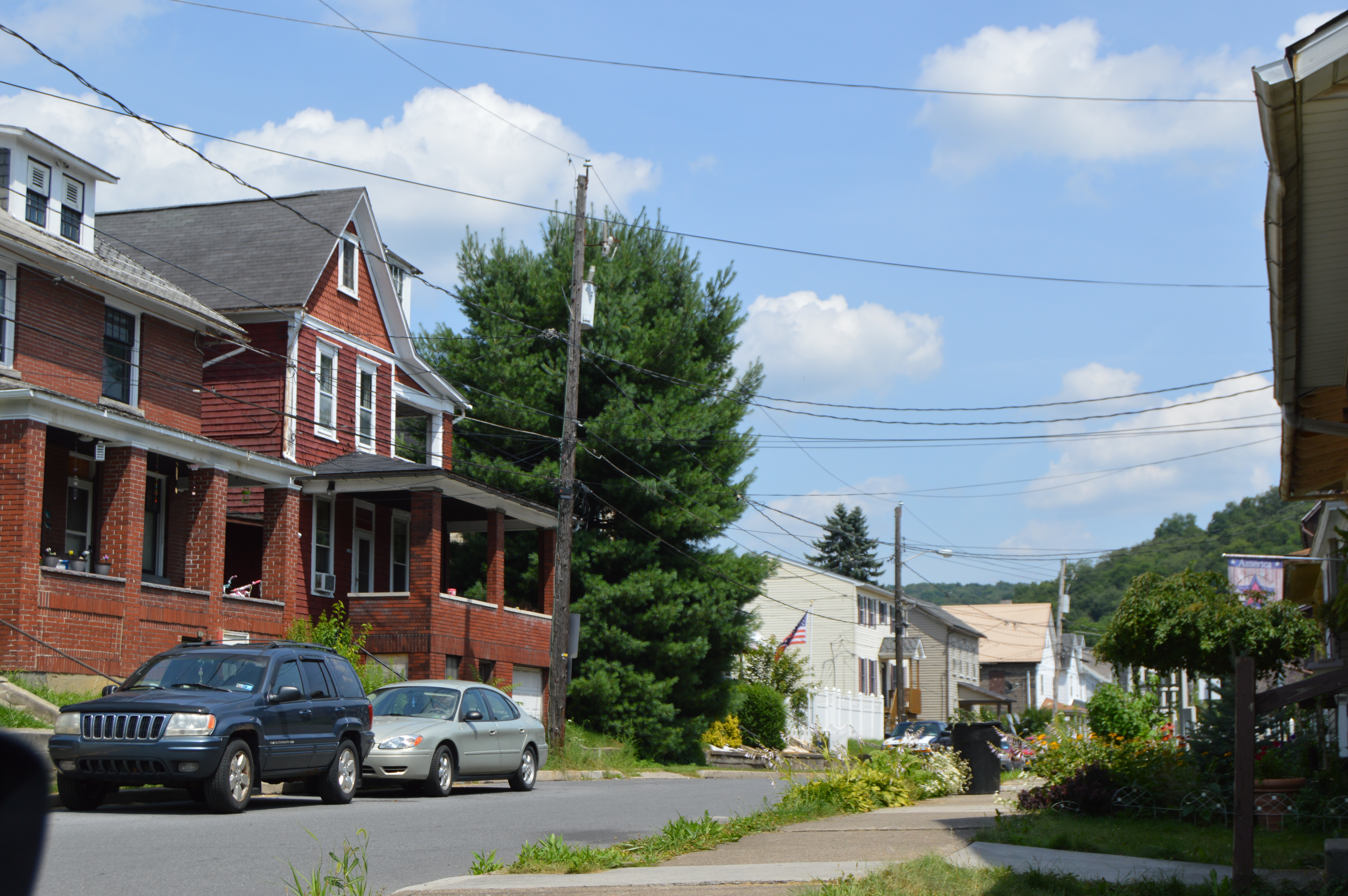
- Residential neighborhood on David Street

- Location of Dale in Cambria County, Pennsylvania.
- Coordinates: 40°18′38″N 78°54′14″W
- Country: United States
- State: Pennsylvania
- County: Cambria
- Incorporated: 1891

Government
  - Type: Borough council

Area
  - Total: 0.18 sq mi (0.46 km^{2})
  - Land: 0.18 sq mi (0.46 km^{2})
  - Water: 0 sq mi (0.00 km^{2})
- Elevation: 1,257 ft (383 m)

Population (2020)
  - Total: 1,008
  - Density: 5,627.8/sq mi (2,172.89/km^{2})
- Time zone: UTC-5 (Eastern (EST))
  - Summer (DST): UTC-4 (EDT)
- ZIP code: 15902
- Area code: 814
- FIPS code: 42-18000
- GNIS feature ID: 1215016
- Website: https://www.daleborough.org/

Dale is a borough in Cambria County, Pennsylvania, United States. It is part of the Johnstown, Pennsylvania Metropolitan Statistical Area. As of the 2020 census, Dale had a population of 1,008.

== Geography ==
Dale is located in southwestern Cambria County at 40°18′38″N 78°54′14″W (40.310524, -78.903886). It is surrounded by the city of Johnstown, but is a separate municipality and part of a separate school district.

According to the United States Census Bureau, the borough has a total area of 0.18 square miles (0.46 km^{2}), all land.

== Demographics ==
Historical population
Census	Pop.	Note	%±
1900	1,503		—
1910	2,285		52.0%
1920	3,115		36.3%
1930	3,364		8.0%
1940	3,291		−2.2%
1950	3,310		0.6%
1960	2,807		−15.2%
1970	2,274		−19.0%
1980	1,906		−16.2%
1990	1,642		−13.9%
2000	1,503		−8.5%
2010	1,234		−17.9%
2020	1,008		−18.3%

As of the census of 2000, there were 1,503 people, 685 households, and 389 families residing in the borough. The population density was 8,516.1 inhabitants per square mile (3,288.1/km^{2}). There were 745 housing units at an average density of 4,221.2 per square mile (1,629.8/km^{2}). The racial makeup of the borough was 93.21% White, 4.59% African American, 0.27% Native American, 0.27% Asian, 0.33% from other races, and 1.33% from two or more races. Hispanic or Latino of any race were 1.46% of the population.

There were 685 households, out of which 26.7% had children under the age of 18 living with them, 37.2% were married couples living together, 15.3% had a female householder with no husband present, and 43.1% were non-families. 38.4% of all households were made up of individuals, and 22.0% had someone living alone who was 65 years of age or older. The average household size was 2.19 and the average family size was 2.88.

In the borough the population was spread out, with 24.5% under the age of 18, 7.7% from 18 to 24, 29.1% from 25 to 44, 19.8% from 45 to 64, and 19.0% who were 65 years of age or older. The median age was 37 years. For every 100 females there were 82.8 males. For every 100 females age 18 and over, there were 76.8 males.

The median income for a household in the borough was $21,591, and the median income for a family was $28,456. Males had a median income of $23,077 versus $18,472 for females. The per capita income for the borough was $14,570. About 15.2% of families and 21.8% of the population were below the poverty line, including 36.4% of those under age 18 and 14.3% of those age 65 or over.
