= Brownstown, Cambria County, Pennsylvania =

Borough in Pennsylvania, US

Brownstown, Pennsylvania
- Borough
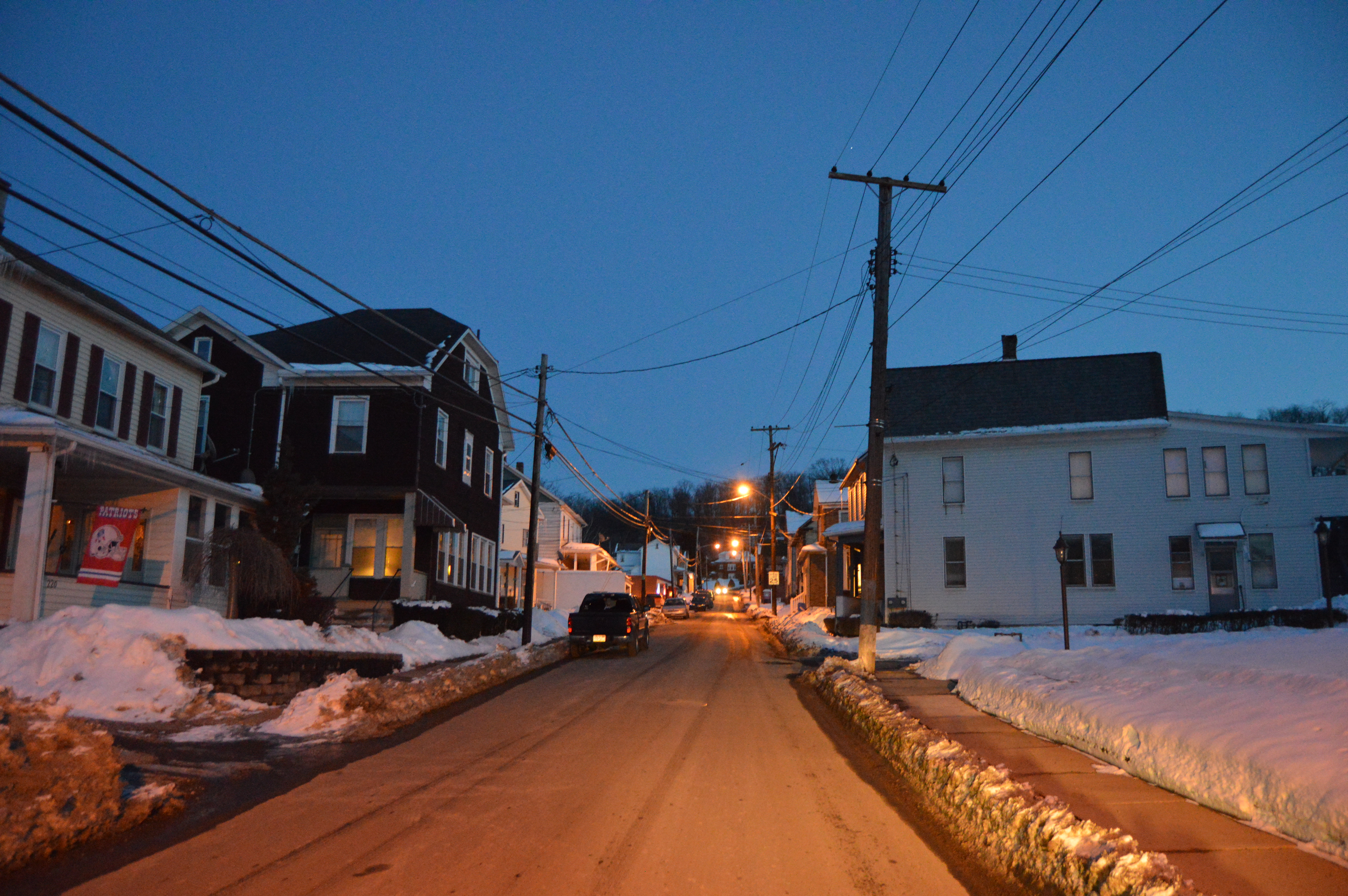
- Houses on Habicht St. at dusk

- Location of Brownstown in Cambria County, Pennsylvania.

- Location within Pennsylvania
- Coordinates: 40°20′01″N 78°56′14″W
- Country: United States
- State: Pennsylvania
- County: Cambria
- Incorporated: 1908

Government
  - Type: Borough Council

Area
  - Total: 0.24 sq mi (0.61 km^{2})
  - Land: 0.24 sq mi (0.61 km^{2})
  - Water: 0 sq mi (0.00 km^{2})
- Elevation: 1,470 ft (450 m)

Population (2020)
  - Total: 696
  - Density: 2,933.0/sq mi (1,132.44/km^{2})
- Time zone: UTC-5 (Eastern (EST))
  - Summer (DST): UTC-4 (EDT)
- ZIP code: 15906
- Area code: 814
- FIPS code: 42-09400
- GNIS feature ID: 1215010

Brownstown is a borough in Cambria County, Pennsylvania, United States. The population was 744 at the 2010 census. It is part of the Johnstown, Pennsylvania Metropolitan Statistical Area and also part of Johnstown's urban area.

== Geography ==
Brownstown is located in southwestern Cambria County at 40°20′01″N 78°56′14″W (40.3336,-78.9371). It is bordered to the south by Westmont. The borough sits on a hill on the west side of the Conemaugh River valley and is 2 miles (3 km) northwest of the center of Johnstown by road.

According to the United States Census Bureau, the borough has a total area of 0.23 square miles (0.6 km^{2}), all land.

== Demographics ==
Historical population
Census	Pop.	Note	%±
1890	550		—
1910	1,300		—
1920	1,489		14.5%
1930	1,586		6.5%
1940	1,598		0.8%
1950	1,508		−5.6%
1960	1,379		−8.6%
1970	1,035		−24.9%
1980	1,077		4.1%
1990	937		−13.0%
2000	883		−5.8%
2010	744		−15.7%
2020	696		−6.5%

As of the census of 2000, there were 883 people, 354 households, and 259 families living in the borough. The population density was 3,467.6 people per square mile (1,338.8 people/km^{2}). There were 372 housing units at an average density of 1,460.9 per square mile (564.1/km^{2}). The racial makeup of the borough was 99.32% White, 0.23% African American, 0.11% Asian, and 0.34% from two or more races.

There were 354 households, out of which 31.1% had children under the age of 18 living with them, 56.8% were married couples living together, 9.6% had a female householder with no husband present, and 26.6% were non-families. 23.4% of all households were made up of individuals, and 13.6% had someone living alone who was 65 years of age or older. The average household size was 2.49 and the average family size was 2.94.

In the borough the population was spread out, with 21.5% under the age of 18, 7.0% from 18 to 24, 27.5% from 25 to 44, 25.4% from 45 to 64, and 18.6% who were 65 years of age or older. The median age was 41 years. For every 100 females there were 92.4 males. For every 100 females age 18 and over, there were 88.8 males.

The median income for a household in the borough was $33,043, and the median income for a family was $36,645. Males had a median income of $25,000 versus $17,386 for females. The per capita income for the borough was $13,494. About 5.3% of families and 8.0% of the population were below the poverty line, including 8.3% of those under the age of 18 and 5.2% who were 65 or older.
