= Westmont, Pennsylvania =

Borough in Pennsylvania, US

- Borough
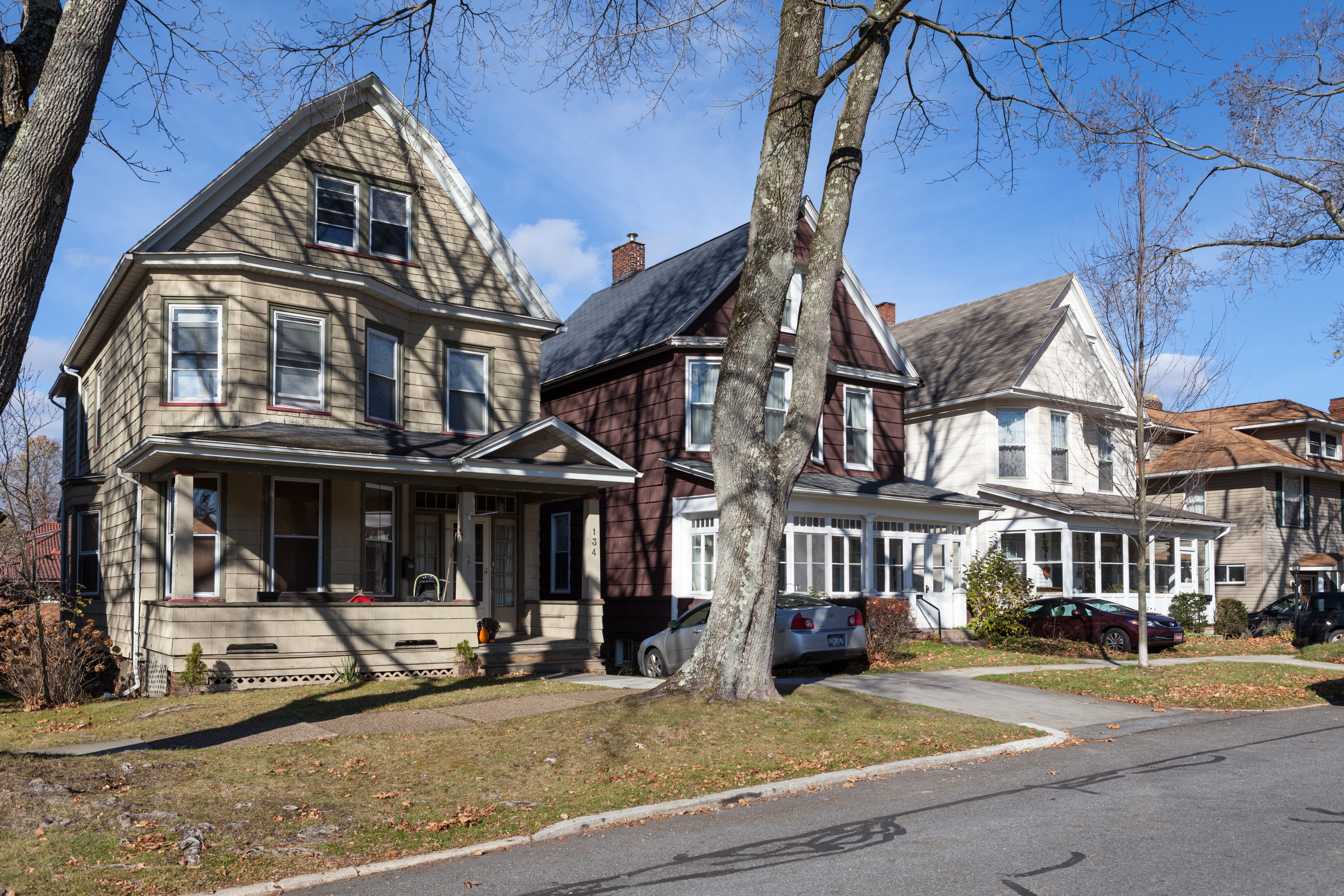
- Tioga Street homes, built in 1901

- Location of Westmont in Cambria County, Pennsylvania.

- Location within Pennsylvania
- Coordinates: 40°19′7″N 78°56′56″W
- Country: United States
- State: Pennsylvania
- County: Cambria
- Settled: 1788
- Incorporated: 1892

Government
  - Mayor: Robert J. Callahan

Area
  - Total: 2.37 sq mi (6.13 km^{2})
  - Land: 2.37 sq mi (6.13 km^{2})
  - Water: 0 sq mi (0.00 km^{2})
- Elevation: 1,752 ft (534 m)

Population (2020)
  - Total: 4,982
  - Density: 2,106.5/sq mi (813.31/km^{2})
- Time zone: UTC-5 (EST)
  - Summer (DST): UTC-4 (EDT)
- FIPS code: 42-83584
- GNIS feature ID: 1215038
- Website: westmontborough.com

Westmont is a borough in Cambria County, Pennsylvania, United States. It is part of the Johnstown, Pennsylvania Metropolitan Statistical Area. As of the 2020 census, Westmont had a population of 4,982.

== Geography ==
Westmont is located in southwestern Cambria County and is bordered to the east by the city of Johnstown, to the north by the borough of Brownstown, and to the south by the borough of Southmont and the unincorporated community of Elim. Westmont sits on heights rising up to 700 feet (210 m) above the Stonycreek and Conemaugh River valleys in the center of Johnstown.

According to the United States Census Bureau, the borough of Westmont has a total area of 2.4 square miles (6.1 km^{2}), all land.

== History ==
Before the Johnstown Flood of 1889, the Yoder Hill area consisted of nothing more than a few farms, accessible by only a few steep, muddy roads. However, since the flood was so devastating to the city and to its major employer, the Cambria Iron Company, the iron company decided to develop the top of the hill as a suburb for its top personnel to live in. The company commissioned the famous landscape architect, Charles Miller, to lay out the grid for the settlement of "Tiptop", later renamed Westmont. Westmont was located on a ridge high above the valley in which Johnstown is located, and thus in a place of safety. As such, it was also above the smoke, noise, and stench of the city, and attracted the well-to-do of the town, eager to escape what (in many cases) their own factories had wrought. An inclined railway, the Johnstown Inclined Plane, was built for easy travel to the city. With the problem of transportation solved, the new settlement began to grow, and it was incorporated as the Borough of Westmont on June 13, 1892. In 1935, the borough bought the inclined railway from Bethlehem Steel.

In 1938 the Johnstown Traction Company began to operate bus service to Westmont via buses that rode up and down the Inclined Plane. At one time there were plans to extend the Southmont streetcar line from its terminus at Diamond Boulevard and Menoher Boulevard along Diamond Boulevard to Luzerne Street, and then along Luzerne Street in the center median to Colgate Avenue. This rail service extension was never constructed, and streetcar service on the Southmont line was discontinued in 1954 when a rock slide along Southmont Boulevard damaged the track and overhead. Following completion of the "Easy Grade" highway of Menoher Boulevard (PA Route 271) from downtown Johnstown through to Westmont, bus service was transferred to this route and service via the Inclined Plane was discontinued.

Because of its upland location, Westmont escaped destruction in the subsequent floods that damaged flood-prone Johnstown.

A Westmont native was the first American soldier to die in the Vietnam War. Captain Harry Griffith Cramer Jr. grew up at 321 Luzerne Street, a house which still stands today. He graduated from West Point in 1946, earned a Silver Star for valor in Korea, and commanded the first team of US Special Forces advisers to deploy to Vietnam. He was killed near Nha Trang on October 21, 1957.

The Westmont Historic District was listed on the National Register of Historic Places in 1995.

== Westmont today ==
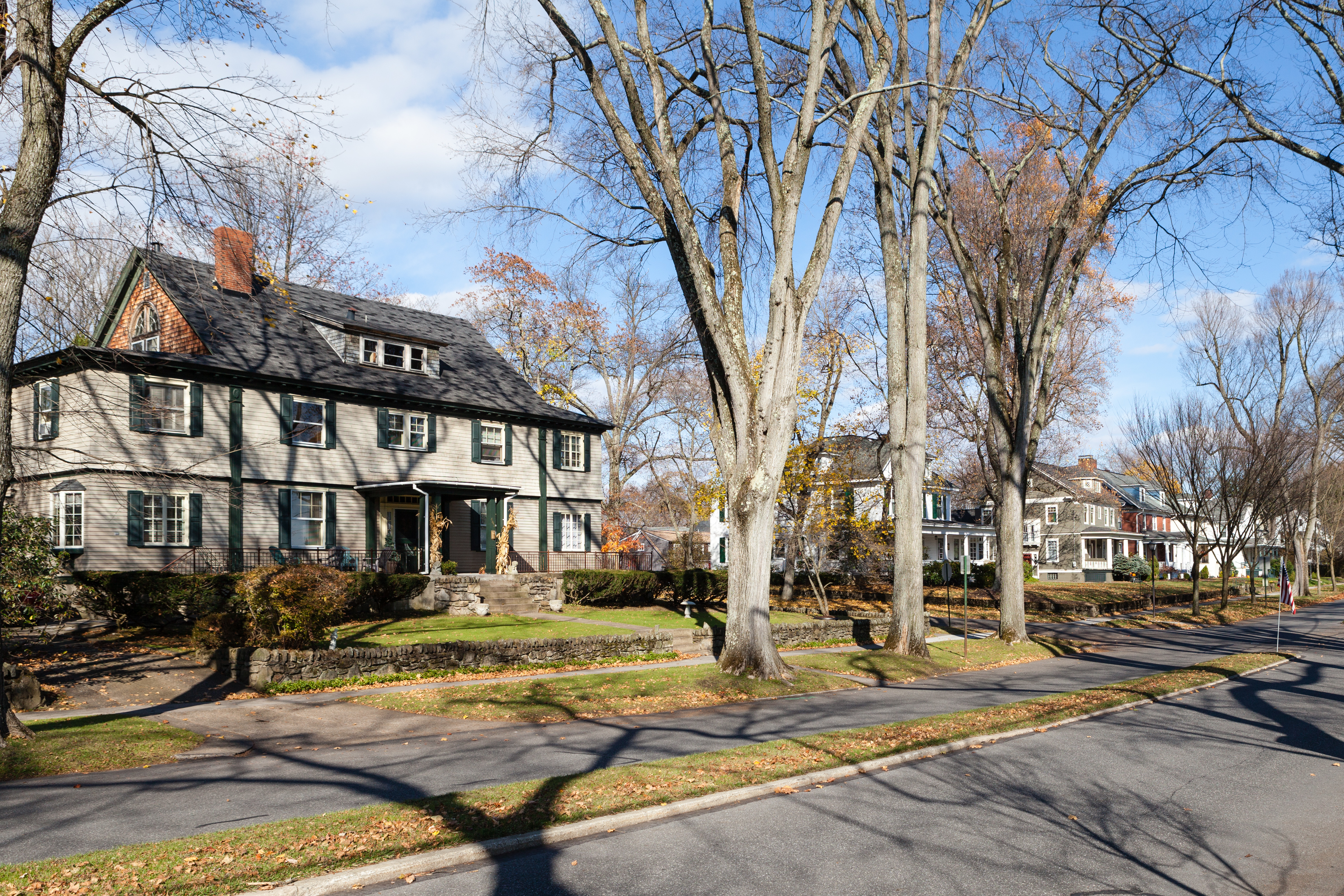
Luzerne Street in the Westmont Historic District, November 2014

Westmont continues to be a town of significant attractive, large, old houses. The present population of Westmont is approximately 5,000 residents.

Westmont is currently governed by the "Weak Mayor-Council" form of government. There are seven council members and a mayor who are elected by the voters for four-year staggered terms. The mayor votes only in case of a tie. The borough council determines municipal policy, enacts laws, approves borough officials, etc. Daily operations are supervised by the borough secretary and the public works director.

Westmont has a volunteer fire company and an ambulance service. Police protection is provided by the West Hills Regional Police Department.

Today, Westmont is considerably larger than originally envisioned by officials of the Cambria Iron Company, but it retains many of the residential characteristics that initially attracted residents. The borough is largely a quiet, tree-lined community, and local regulations continue to restrict commercial development.

Perhaps the town's standout feature is the allée of American elm trees along Luzerne Street, the last cathedral-arched boulevard left in the United States. Today there are 195 elms, the longest continuous stand of American elms in the country, planted along Luzerne Street. Westmont's elm trees are intensively maintained to protect them from Dutch elm disease.

== Demographics ==
Historical population
| Census | Pop. | Note | %± |
|---|---|---|---|
| 1900 | 499 | | — |
| 1910 | 1,468 | | 194.2% |
| 1920 | 1,976 | | 34.6% |
| 1930 | 3,388 | | 71.5% |
| 1940 | 3,741 | | 10.4% |
| 1950 | 4,410 | | 17.9% |
| 1960 | 6,573 | | 49.0% |
| 1970 | 6,673 | | 1.5% |
| 1980 | 6,113 | | −8.4% |
| 1990 | 5,789 | | −5.3% |
| 2000 | 5,523 | | −4.6% |
| 2010 | 5,181 | | −6.2% |
| 2020 | 4,982 | | −3.8% |
U.S. Decennial Census

=== 2020 census ===
As of the 2020 census, Westmont had a population of 4,982. The median age was 47.6 years. 20.1% of residents were under the age of 18 and 25.8% of residents were 65 years of age or older. For every 100 females there were 91.0 males, and for every 100 females age 18 and over there were 90.8 males age 18 and over.

100.0% of residents lived in urban areas, while 0.0% lived in rural areas.

There were 2,099 households in Westmont, of which 25.7% had children under the age of 18 living in them. Of all households, 56.2% were married-couple households, 14.4% were households with a male householder and no spouse or partner present, and 24.4% were households with a female householder and no spouse or partner present. About 28.1% of all households were made up of individuals and 16.1% had someone living alone who was 65 years of age or older.

There were 2,314 housing units, of which 9.3% were vacant. The homeowner vacancy rate was 2.7% and the rental vacancy rate was 12.2%.

Racial composition as of the 2020 census
| Race | Number | Percent |
|---|---|---|
| White | 4,596 | 92.3% |
| Black or African American | 75 | 1.5% |
| American Indian and Alaska Native | 2 | 0.0% |
| Asian | 92 | 1.8% |
| Native Hawaiian and Other Pacific Islander | 1 | 0.0% |
| Some other race | 18 | 0.4% |
| Two or more races | 198 | 4.0% |
| Hispanic or Latino (of any race) | 114 | 2.3% |

=== 2000 census ===
As of the census of 2000, there were 5,523 people, 2,238 households, and 1,627 families residing in the borough. The population density was 2,330.0 inhabitants per square mile (899.6/km^{2}). There were 2,376 housing units at an average density of 1,002.4 per square mile (387.0/km^{2}). The racial makeup of the borough was 97.59% White, 0.31% African American, 0.09% Native American, 1.29% Asian, 0.05% Pacific Islander, 0.13% from other races, and 0.54% from two or more races. Hispanic or Latino of any race were 0.91% of the population.

There were 2,238 households, out of which 30.7% had children under the age of 18 living with them, 62.1% were married couples living together, 8.4% had a female householder with no husband present, and 27.3% were non-families. 25.6% of all households were made up of individuals, and 13.9% had someone living alone who was 65 years of age or older. The average household size was 2.47 and the average family size was 2.96.

In the borough the population was spread out, with 24.4% under the age of 18, 4.3% from 18 to 24, 23.1% from 25 to 44, 28.2% from 45 to 64, and 20.0% who were 65 years of age or older. The median age was 44 years. For every 100 females there were 89.1 males. For every 100 females age 18 and over, there were 83.9 males.

The median income for a household in the borough was $53,580, and the median income for a family was $64,185. Males had a median income of $47,477 versus $32,111 for females. The per capita income for the borough was $30,868. About 3.1% of families and 3.8% of the population were below the poverty line, including 2.5% of those under age 18 and 1.6% of those age 65 or over.

== See also ==
- Stackhouse Park
- Westmont Hilltop High School
