= Pennsylvania House of Representatives, District 71 =

American legislative district

Pennsylvania's 71st State House of Representatives district
Representative
Jim Rigby; R–Johnstown
- Population (2022): 62,849

The 71st Pennsylvania House of Representatives District is located in central Pennsylvania and has been represented by Jim Rigby since 2019.

== District profile ==
The 71st District is located in Cambria County and Somerset County and includes the following areas:

Cambria County

- Adams Township
- Allegheny Township
- Ashville
- Cassandra
- Chest Springs
- Chest Township
- Clearfield Township
- Cresson
- Cresson Township
- Dean Township
- Ferndale
- Gallitizin
- Gallitzin
- Geistown
- Lilly
- Loretto
- Munster Township
- Portage
- Portage Township
- Reade Township
- Richland Township
- Sankertown
- Scalp Level
- South Fork
- Stonycreek Township
- Summerhill Township
- Tunnelhill (Cambria County Portion)
- Washington Township
- White Township
- Wilmore

Somerset County

- Ogle Township
- Paint
- Paint Township
- Windber

== Representatives ==
Representative	Party	Years	District home	Note
Prior to 1969, seats were apportioned by county.
Joseph J. McAneny	Democrat	1969 – 1970		
Patrick A. Gleason	Republican	1971 – 1976		
C. Adam Bittinger	Democrat	1977 – 1978		
Rita Clark	Republican	1979 – 1980		
John N. Wozniak	Democrat	1981 – 1996	Johnstown	Elected to the Pennsylvania State Senate
Edward P. Wojnaroski, Sr.	Democrat	1997 – 2008	Johnstown	
Bryan Barbin	Democrat	2009 – 2018		
Jim Rigby	Republican	2019 – present	Johnstown	

== Recent election results ==
PA House election, 2024: Pennsylvania House, District 71
Party	Candidate	Votes	%
Republican	Jim Rigby (incumbent)	Unopposed	
Total votes		30,204	100.00
Republican hold			

PA House election, 2022: Pennsylvania House, District 71
Party	Candidate	Votes	%
Republican	Jim Rigby (incumbent)	Unopposed	
Total votes		23,233	100.00
Republican hold			

PA House election, 2020: Pennsylvania House, District 71
Party	Candidate	Votes	%
Republican	Jim Rigby (incumbent)	Unopposed	
Total votes		26,689	100.00
Republican hold			

PA House election, 2018: Pennsylvania House, District 71
Party	Candidate	Votes	%
Republican	Jim Rigby	11,615	52.14
Democratic	Bryan Barbin (incumbent)	10,661	47.86
Total votes		22,276	100.00
Republican gain from Democratic			

PA House election, 2016: Pennsylvania House, District 71
Party	Candidate	Votes	%
Democratic	Bryan Barbin (incumbent)	16,557	58.98
Republican	Mark Amsdell	11,515	41.02
Total votes		28,072	100.00
Democratic hold			
