= Central Mainline Sewer Authority =

Sewage treatment agency in Pennsylvania, US

- CMSA

Sewage treatment authority overview
- Formed: 1992
- Type: sewage treatment authority
- Jurisdiction: Lilly and Cassandra Boroughs; Washington Township and portions of Cresson and Portage Townships, all in Cambria County, Pennsylvania
- Headquarters: 93 Jones Street; Lilly, Pennsylvania 15938; 40°25′33.57″N 78°36′31.21″W

Central Mainline Sewer Authority is an agency providing sewage treatment to all of Cassandra and Lilly Boroughs and parts of Cresson, Portage, and Washington Townships.

== About the system ==
Discussions began back in 1992 between the different municipalities on how to bring public sewerage in the area. It was not until 2002 that the construction of sewer lines, and later the treatment plant began. A dedication ceremony was held on August 21, 2006, by local congressman John Murtha who said "You can breathe and smell fresh air. You don’t smell it anymore in Lilly, the way it used to be." The total costs of the system was $10 million and took 14 years.
