= Penn Cambria School District =

School district in Pennsylvania

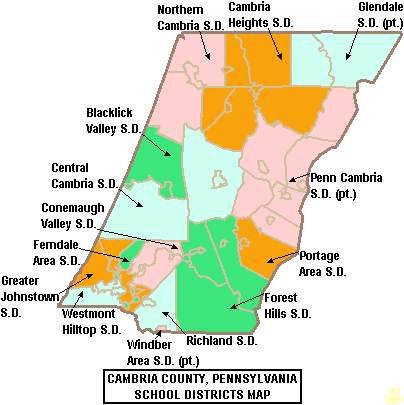

Address
- 201 6th Street Cresson, Cambria County, Pennsylvania, 16630; United States of America

District information
- Type: Public
- Grades: Preschool-12
- Established: 1966

Students and staff
- District mascot: Panther
- Colors: Blue, Black, White

Other information
- Website: https://www.pcam.org/

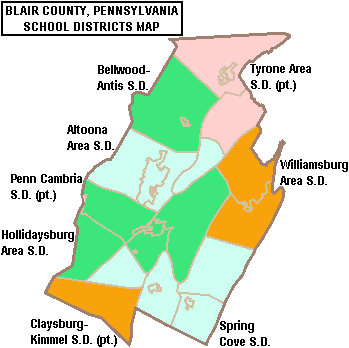
Penn Cambria School District region in Blair County

Penn Cambria School District is a small, rural, public school district located in Cambria County, Pennsylvania. The district serves the boroughs of Ashville, Cresson, Gallitzin, Lilly, Loretto, Sankertown and Tunnelhill in both Blair County and Cambria County. As well as the townships of Allegheny, Cresson, Dean, Gallitzin, Munster, and Washington. Penn Cambria covers 108 square miles (280 km^{2}) in east-central Cambria County. According to 2000 federal census data, Penn Cambria School District served a resident population of 16,744. By 2010, the district's population increased to 17,359 people. The educational attainment levels for the School District population (25 years old and over) were 88.8% high school graduates and 14.9% college graduates. The district is one of the 500 public school districts of Pennsylvania.

According to the Pennsylvania Budget and Policy Center, 37.2% of the district's pupils lived at 185% or below the Federal Poverty Level as shown by their eligibility for the federal free or reduced price school meal programs in 2012. In 2009, the district residents’ per capita income was $13,603, while the median family income was $40,432. In the Commonwealth, the median family income was $49,501 and the United States median family income was $49,445, in 2010. In Cambria County, the median household income was $39,574. By 2013, the median household income in the United States rose to $52,100.

== Board of Directors ==
Penn Cambria has nine school directors as in accordance with state law. Approximately half of the school board is up for election every two years.

The Superintendent of Penn Cambria School District is currently Jaime Hartline.

Name	Position	Next Election Year
Michael Sheehan	President	2027
Rudy McCarthy	Vice President	2025
Matthew Kearney	Secretary	2025
Jeffrey Stohon	Treasurer	2027
Caleb Drenning (Lost Re-Election)	Member	2025
Guy Monica	Member	2027
Anthony Dziabo	Member	2027
Cindy Sheehan-Westrick	Member	2027
Jennifer Gmuca	Member	2025

== School Director Elections ==
=== 2025 Penn Cambria School Director Primary Election ===
The most recent school director primary election was held on Tuesday, May 20, 2025. There will be five candidates on both republican and democratic ballots due to a process known as cross-filling. Caleb Drenning*, Carrie Andraychak, Rodney "Rudy" McCarthy*, Matthew Kearney*, and Tony Tomaselli. Voters could vote for no more than 4 candidates. In both Democratic and Republican primaries, one-term incumbent school board director, Caleb Drenning finished 5th place, meaning he will not appear on the general ballot in November.

Republican Primary Results

Candidates Name	Votes Received	Percentage of Vote
Carrie Andraychak	541	18.44%
Caleb Drenning*	424	14.45%
Tony Tomaselli	722	24.61%
Matthew Kearney*	681	23.21%
Rodney 'Rudy' McCarthy*	518	17.66%
Write-In	48	1.64%

Democratic Primary Results

Candidates Name	Votes Received	Percentage of Vote
Caleb Drenning*	330	13.37%
Carrie Andraychak	517	20.94%
Rodney 'Rudy' McCarthy*	722	18.19%
Matthew Kearney*	449	20.33%
Tony Tomaselli	642	26.00%
Write-In	29	1.17%

=== 2025 Penn Cambria School Director General Election ===
The next general election in the United States will be help on Tuesday, November 4, 2025. Voters will be able to vote for no more than 4 candidates.

=== 2023 Penn Cambria School Director Primary Election ===
The previous school director primary election was held on Tuesday, May 16, 2023. There were six candidates on both republican and democrat ballots due to a process known as cross-filing. Michael Sheehan*, Cindy Sheehan-Westrick, Anthony Dziabo, Jeff Stohon*, Guy Monica*, and Tyler Ream. Of these six candidates, three of them were incumbents (indicated by *), while the other three ran for two open seats left by the retirement of former board president, George Pyo, and former board vice president, Justin Roberts. Tony Tomaselli ran as a write-in candidate. On April 12, 2023, one-term incumbent, Matthew Kearney officially endorsed Tyler Ream, Cindy Sheehan-Westrick, Tony Tomaselli, Mike Sheehan, and Jeff Stohon. Voters could vote for no more than five candidates on a single ballot. In both the republican and democrat primaries, Tyler Ream finished 6th place, preventing him from the general election ballot.

Republican Primary Results

Candidates Name	Votes Received	Percentage of Vote
Guy Monica*	613	13.36%
Michael Sheehan*	878	19.13%
Anthony Dziabo	673	14.67%
Tyler Ream	563	12.43%
Jeff Stohon*	708	15.43%
Cindy Sheehan-Westrick	805	17.54%
Write-In	349	7.61%

Democratic Primary Results

Candidates Name	Votes Received	Percentage of Vote
Anthony Dziabo	579	15.15%
Michael Sheehan*	713	18.66%
Cindy Sheehan-Westrick	698	18.26%
Guy Monica*	498	13.03%
Jeff Stohon*	565	14.78%
Tyler Ream	467	12.22%
Write-In	302	7.90%

=== 2023 Penn Cambria School Director General Election ===
The most recent school director election was held on Tuesday, November 7, 2023. On the general election ballot, there were five candidates: Michael Sheehan*, Cindy Sheehan-Westrick, Anthony Dziabo, Jeff Stohon*, and Guy Monica*. Out of these five candidates, three were incumbents running for reelection (indicated by *), while the other two ran for two open seats left by the retirement of former board president, George Pyo, and former board vice president, Justin Roberts. All of the candidates on the general ballot won both the Democrat and Republican nominations, due to a process known as cross-filing. Voters could vote for no more than 5 candidates on a single ballot. All of the candidates on the ballot won their respective election.

General Election Results

Candidates Name	Votes Received	Percentage of Vote
Michael Sheehan*	2,133	22.68%
Cindy Sheehan-Westrick	1,952	20.76%
Anthony Dziabo	1,763	18.75%
Jeff Stohon*	1,757	18.69%
Guy Monica*	1,672	14.78%
Write-In	126	1.34%

== School Buildings ==
Penn Cambria has five school buildings, each serving a certain number of grade levels:

School name	Grade Level	Administrator
Penn Cambria Pre-Primary School	Grades PreK-1	Joesph Smorto
Penn Cambria Intermediate School	Grades 2-3	Joseph Smorto
Penn Cambria Middle School	Grades 4-6	Justin Wheeler
Penn Cambria High School	Grades 7-12	Benjamin Watt, Dane Harrold ("Co-Principal")

High school students may choose to attend Admiral Peary Area Vocational Technical School for training in hands-on trades. The Appalachia Intermediate Unit IU8 provides the district with a wide variety of services like specialized education for disabled students and hearing, background checks for employees, state mandated recognizing and reporting child abuse training, speech and visual disability services and professional development for staff and faculty.

== High School Athletics ==
Boys Sports

- Baseball - Class AA
- Basketball - Class AA
- Cross Country - Class A
- Football - Class AA
- Golf - Class AA
- Track and Field - Class AA
- Wrestling - Class AA

Girls Sports

- Basketball - Class AA
- Cross Country - Class A
- Soccer - Class A
- Softball - Class AA
- Track and Field - Class AA
- Volleyball - Class AA

Middle School Sports:

Boys

- Basketball
- Football
- Wrestling

Girls

- Basketball
- Volleyball

According to PIAA directory July 2015
