= Benjamin Franklin Jones Cottage =

Historic house in Pennsylvania, United States

- Benjamin F. Jones Cottage
- U.S. National Register of Historic Places
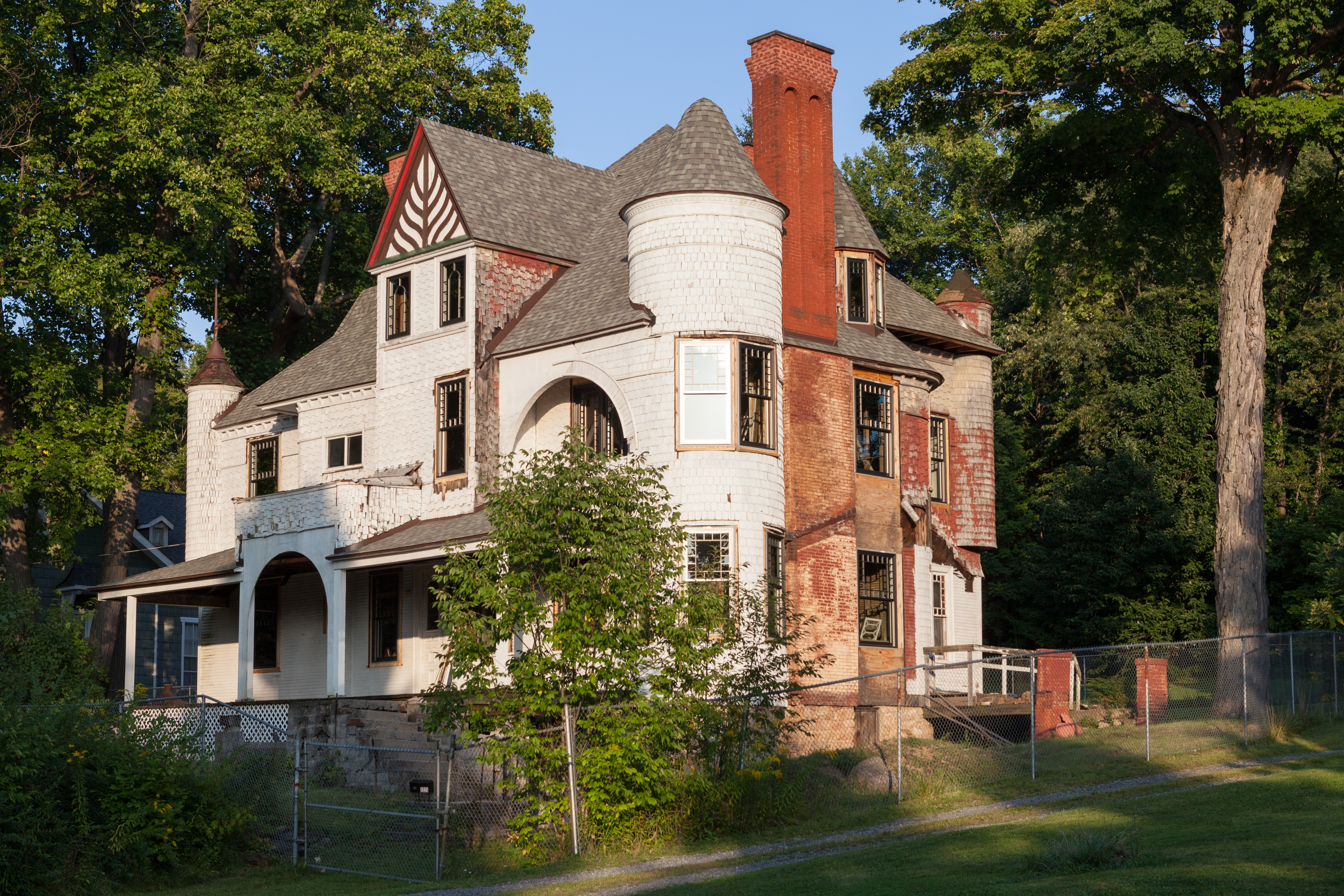
- Front and side (west corner) in September 2014

- Location within Pennsylvania Location within the United States
- Location: Third St., Cresson Township, Cambria County, Pennsylvania, United States
- Coordinates: 40°27′27″N 78°35′30″W
- Area: less than one acre
- Built: 1888
- Architectural style: Queen Anne
- NRHP reference No.: 95000125
- Added to NRHP: February 24, 1995

The Benjamin Franklin Jones Cottage (also known as Braemar Cottage) is a cottage on the National Register of Historic Places in Cresson Township, Cambria County, Pennsylvania, United States.

In 1990, the mansion was purchased by a group that desired to restore it. In November 2009, a county judge declared the declining property a nuisance and ordered that it be demolished. When the historical group appealed to the Pennsylvania Commonwealth Court, the town supervisors agreed to postpone the demolition until May 2010. A request for a $150,000 grant that the group hoped could fund renovations was rejected.

The structure was saved from demolition in 2011 when it was purchased by a Cresson, Pennsylvania couple who intended to restore it.

== See also ==
- Benjamin Franklin Jones (industrialist)
