= Lawrence Flick State Hospital =

Geography
- Location: Cresson, Pennsylvania, United States

Organization
- Type: State Mental Health Hospital
- Patron: None

Helipads
- Helipad: Yes (later was used as parking lot)

History
- Founded: 1912
- Closed: 1984

Links
- Lists: Hospitals in Pennsylvania
- Other links: Pennsylvania State Hospitals

Lawrence Flick State Hospital was a state mental health hospital near Cresson, Pennsylvania that had several different names and uses before becoming defunct and converted into a prison in the 1980s.

It is located on Old Route 22, approximately one mile east of the town of Cresson in Cambria County and has a rich history of service to the health and welfare of the citizens of the Commonwealth of Pennsylvania.

Beginning with the donation of the land by steel tycoon and philanthropist Andrew Carnegie and prescribed by the Act of Assembly in June 1910, the Cresson Tuberculosis Sanatorium was opened in 1916. The location was considered as ideal due to the abundance of fresh air and the treatments used to combat the disease. The present administration building was built in the European style with gargoyles on the tower and the crests of Scottish clans cut into the sandstone as a reminder of Mr. Carnegie's heritage.

With the introduction of new drugs and treatments for tuberculosis, the need for sanatoriums declined. In December 1956 the facility was incorporated into the Lawrence F. Flick State Hospital being run by the Department of Public Welfare to treat the mentally ill. The facility remained in operation until December 1982.

== Cresson Tuberculosis Sanatorium (1916–1964) ==
The facility was used at first as a treatment center for tuberculosis patients as the mountain air was supposedly good for treatment. Construction on the facility started in 1912 and took four years to complete. The land on which this facility sat was donated by steel tycoon Andrew Carnegie.

== Current day and preservation (1987–present) ==
- The graves of deceased patients were turned into a memorial outside the facility by then-Pennsylvania First Lady, Ginny Thornburgh. The memorial is maintained by DOC Maintenance Employees and inmates at the facility.
- The facility re-opened in 1987 as State Correctional Institution – Cresson and operated as such until 2013.
