= Cambria County Conservation And Recreation Authority =

Coordinates: 40.47834°N 78.72719°W

- CCCRA

Conservation District Authority overview
- Type: Conservation and Recreation Authority
- Jurisdiction: Cambria County, Pennsylvania
- Headquarters: 401 Candlelight Drive, Suite 234; Ebensburg, Pennsylvania
- Employees: 2
- Conservation District Authority executive: Clifford Kitner, Executive Director

Map
- Map of Cambria County, Pennsylvania

The Cambria County Conservation and Recreation Authority was created in 1994 by the Cambria County Commissioners using the Municipal Authorities Act of 1945 to establish recreation opportunities as well as assist with cleanup of streams and rivers due to pollution from coal mining in the county. The authority is overseen by a fifteen-member board of directors, made up of residents throughout Cambria County.

== Projects ==
CCCRA has conducted several conservation and recreation projects, as well as partnered with several other agencies since its incorporation, including

=== Recreation Projects ===
- Ghost Town Trail
- Rock Run Recreation Area
- Path of the Flood Trail
- James Mayer Riverswalk Trail

=== Conservation Projects ===
- Bear Rock Run AMD Remediation, Washington Township
- Gray Run AMD Remediation, Lower Yoder Township
- Sulfur Creek AMD Remediation, Adams Township
- Webster Mine Remediation, Nanty Glo Borough
- Barnes/Watkins Coal Refuse Pile Remediation, Barr Township

== See also ==
- List of municipal authorities in Cambria County, Pennsylvania
