= Patrick Gleason =

Patrick Gleason may refer to:

- Patrick Gleason (politician) (1844–1901), American politician
- Patrick Gleason (artist), American comic book artist
- Patrick A. Gleason (born 1934), Pennsylvania politician
- Pat Gleason (actor), actor in such films as Brother Orchid (1940) and Detour (1945)
