= John N. Wozniak =

American politician (born 1956)

Member of the Pennsylvania Senate from the 35th district
- In office January 7, 1997 – November 30, 2016
- Preceded by: William Stewart
- Succeeded by: Wayne Langerholc

Member of the Pennsylvania House of Representatives from the 71st district
- In office January 6, 1981 – November 27, 1996
- Preceded by: Rita Clark
- Succeeded by: Edward Wojnaroski

Personal details
- Born: March 21, 1956 (age 70) Fort Knox, Kentucky
- Party: Democratic
- Spouse: Vanessa Wozniak

John N. Wozniak (born March 21, 1956) is a Democratic politician. He served as a Pennsylvania State Senator from the 35th district from 1997 to 2016.

Prior to that, he served as a member of the Pennsylvania House of Representatives from the 71st district from 1981 to 1996.

== Formative years and family ==
Wozniak was born to a military family. After spending his early childhood on a military base in Fort Knox, Kentucky, he returned to his family home in Johnstown, Pennsylvania. Wozniak earned a degree in economics from the University of Pittsburgh at Johnstown, where he was a member of Delta Chi fraternity.

He and his wife, Vanessa, have two children, Michael and Rachel.

== Career ==
Wozniak was elected to the Pennsylvania House of Representatives in 1980, where he served until his election to the Senate of Pennsylvania in 1996.

Three months before the 2016 election, Wozniak announced his retirement, saying he wanted to spend time with his family while he still had time to do so.

On March 30, 2017, Governor Tom Wolf nominated Wozniak to the Pennsylvania Turnpike Commission.

== Senate Committees ==
- Finance Committee (chairman), Agriculture and Rural Affairs, Community and Economic Development, Game and Fisheries, and Intergovernmental Affairs
