= Cresson Township, Pennsylvania =

Township in Pennsylvania, US

Coordinates: 40°27′30″N 78°34′58″W

- Township
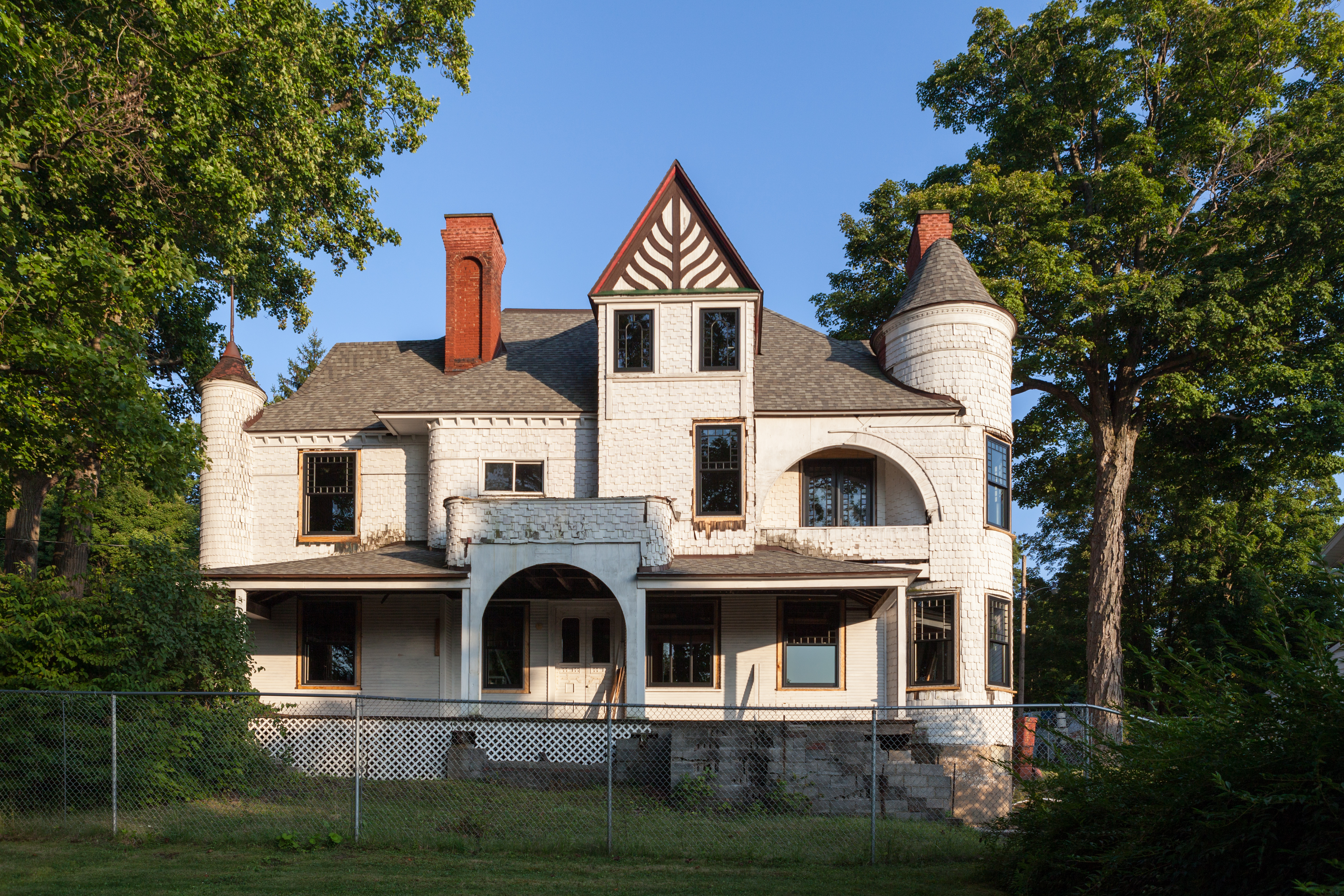
- The Benjamin F. Jones Cottage, a historic site in the township

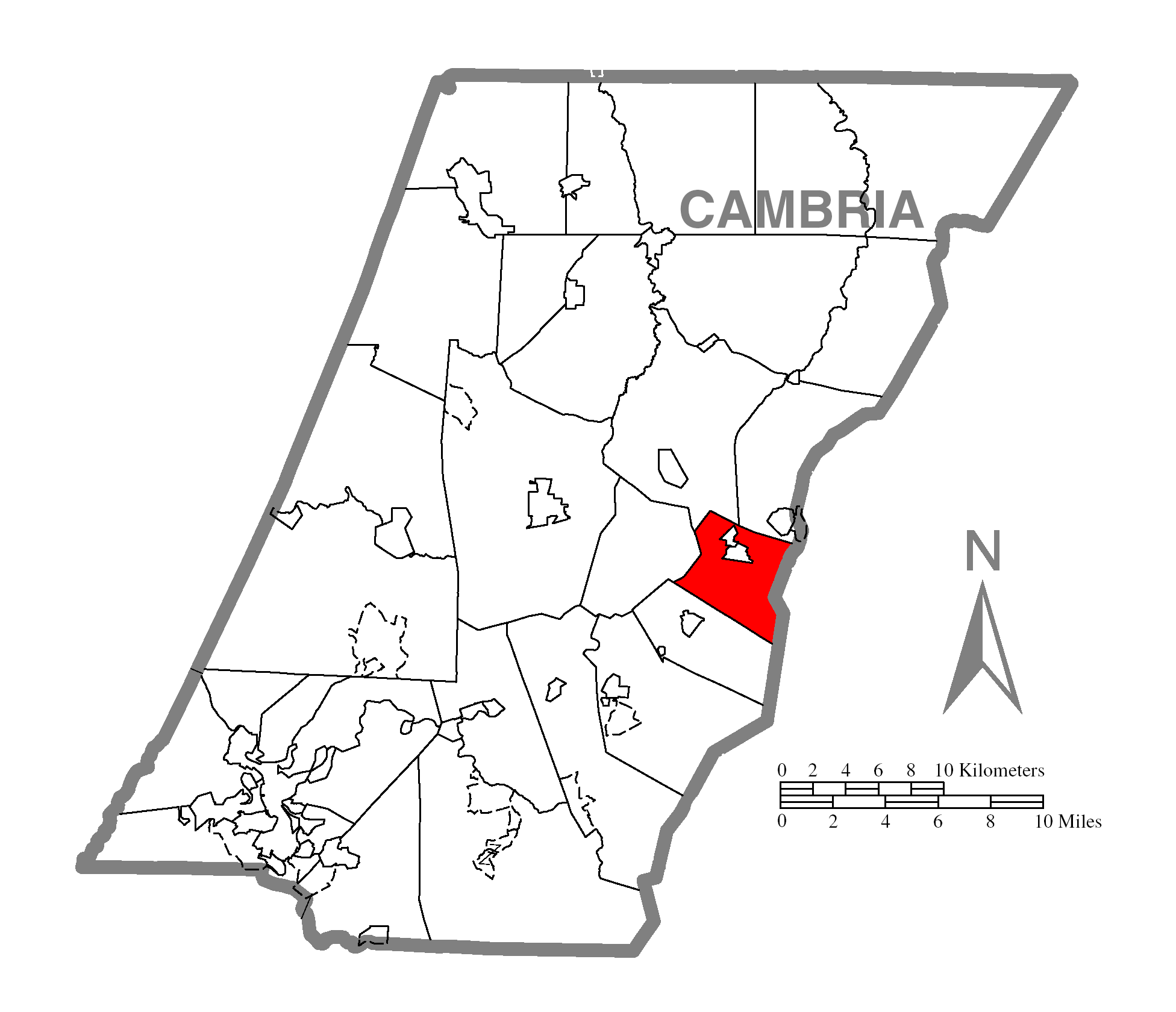
- Map of Cambria County, Pennsylvania highlighting Cresson Township

- Map of Cambria County, Pennsylvania
- Country: United States
- State: Pennsylvania
- County: Cambria
- Incorporated: 1893

Area
  - Total: 12.05 sq mi (31.20 km^{2})
  - Land: 12.03 sq mi (31.15 km^{2})
  - Water: 0.023 sq mi (0.06 km^{2})

Population (2020)
  - Total: 2,820 ▼
  - Estimate (2021): 2,794
  - Density: 228.5/sq mi (88.23/km^{2})
- Time zone: UTC-5 (Eastern (EST))
  - Summer (DST): UTC-4 (EDT)
- Area code: 814
- FIPS code: 42-021-17144

Cresson Township is a township in Cambria County, Pennsylvania, United States. The population was 2,820 at the 2020 census. The township surrounds the boroughs of Cresson and Sankertown but is separate from them. It is part of the Johnstown, Pennsylvania Metropolitan Statistical Area.

== History ==
The Benjamin F. Jones Cottage was listed on the National Register of Historic Places in 1995.

== Geography ==
Cresson Township is located in eastern Cambria County and is bordered on the east by Blair County. The township is 8 miles (13 km) east of Ebensburg, the Cambria County seat, and 18 miles (29 km) southwest of Altoona. The eastern edge of the township approximately follows the crest of the Allegheny Front, the height of land between the Susquehanna River watershed to the east and the Ohio River watershed to the west. The Allegheny Portage Railroad National Historic Site is in the eastern part of the township.

According to the United States Census Bureau, Cresson Township has a total area of 12.0 square miles (31.2 km^{2}), of which 0.02 square miles (0.06 km^{2}), or 0.18%, is water.

== Communities ==
=== Unincorporated communities ===
- Dysertown
- Summit

== Demographics ==
Historical population
Census	Pop.	Note	%±
2000	4,055		—
2010	4,336		6.9%
2020	2,820		−35.0%
2021 (est.)	2,794		−0.9%
U.S. Decennial Census

As of the census of 2000, there were 4,055 people, 1,045 households, and 688 families residing in the township. The population density was 342.8 inhabitants per square mile (132.4/km^{2}). There were 1,129 housing units at an average density of 95.5 per square mile (36.9/km^{2}). The racial makeup of the township was 82.42% White, 13.69% African American, 0.20% Native American, 0.25% Asian, 2.96% from other races, and 0.49% from two or more races. Hispanic or Latino of any race were 3.48% of the population.

There were 1,045 households, out of which 30.5% had children under the age of 18 living with them, 51.6% were married couples living together, 10.0% had a female householder with no husband present, and 34.1% were non-families. 29.8% of all households were made up of individuals, and 13.6% had someone living alone who was 65 years of age or older. The average household size was 2.50 and the average family size was 3.10.

In the township the population was spread out, with 16.0% under the age of 18, 14.4% from 18 to 24, 37.4% from 25 to 44, 20.6% from 45 to 64, and 11.7% who were 65 years of age or older. The median age was 36 years. For every 100 females there were 168.0 males. For every 100 females age 18 and over, there were 181.2 males.

The median income for a household in the township was $35,375, and the median income for a family was $46,908. Males had a median income of $31,836 versus $24,018 for females. The per capita income for the township was $12,575. About 7.1% of families and 11.3% of the population were below the poverty line, including 10.7% of those under age 18 and 18.0% of those age 65 or over.

== Sewage treatment ==
Sewage treatment in portions of the township is provided by the Central Mainline Sewage Authority. A dedication ceremony was held on August 21, 2006, by local congressman John Murtha. The total cost of the system is $10 million, and construction took 14 years. Central-Mainline serves over 2,000 customers and is named after the "Mainline" of the former Pennsylvania Railroad that proceeds through the five municipalities. The railway is now part of the Norfolk Southern system.

== Government ==
State Correctional Institution – Cresson, a prison of the Pennsylvania Department of Corrections, was in the township.

== Education ==
Mount Aloysius College is in Cresson Township.

The township is in the Penn Cambria School District.
