= C. Adam Bittinger =

American politician

Member of the Pennsylvania House of Representatives from the 71st district
- In office January 4, 1977 – November 30, 1978
- Preceded by: Patrick Gleason
- Succeeded by: Rita Clark

Personal details
- Born: November 28, 1943 Chambersburg, Pennsylvania
- Died: November 9, 2010 (aged 66) Key West, Florida
- Party: Democratic

C. Adam Bittinger (November 28, 1943 – November 9, 2010) was a Democratic member of the Pennsylvania House of Representatives.

== Formative years ==
Bittinger was born on November 28, 1943 in Franklin County, Pennsylvania. He subsequently attended York College.

== Career ==
Bittinger worked as a news reporter, radio talk show host and news director for WWBR Radio. He was also police officer for 22 years.

He was elected to the Pennsylvania House of Representatives for the 1977 term.

== Death and interment ==
Bittinger died on November 9, 2010 in Key West, Florida.
