= Coupon, Pennsylvania =

Unincorporated community in Pennsylvania, US

- Unincorporated community
- Pennsylvania
- Coordinates: 40°32′12″N 78°33′54″W
- Country: United States
- State: Pennsylvania
- County: Cambria
- Township: Gallitzin
- Elevation: 2,343 ft (714 m)
- Time zone: UTC-5 (Eastern (EST))
  - Summer (DST): UTC-4 (EDT)
- ZIP code: 16629
- Area code: 814

Coupon is an unincorporated community in Cambria County, Pennsylvania, United States.

== History ==
The community was originally a company town, and its name is derived from the practice of paying employees in scrip, or coupons.

== Geography ==
Coupon is located in the northeastern part of Gallitzin Township near the eastern border of Cambria County at the crest of the Allegheny Front, the eastern edge of the Allegheny Plateau. It is located at 40°32′12″N 78°33′54″W (40.5367356, -78.5150162), about 87 miles (140 km) east of Pittsburgh and 9 miles (14 km) west of Altoona. It has an elevation of 2,342 feet (714 m) above sea level.

== Demographics ==
As of 2010, the Coupon ZIP code area had a population of 73.

== Recreation ==
Coupon is within hiking distance of the Horseshoe Curve, and hikers are rewarded with a unique view of the National Historic Landmark that is not otherwise accessible from the visitors' center.
