= Rita Clark =

American politician

Member of the Pennsylvania House of Representatives from the 71st district
- In office January 2, 1979 – November 30, 1980
- Preceded by: Adam Bittinger
- Succeeded by: John Wozniak

Personal details
- Born: M. Rita Pohl; September 12, 1915 Johnstown, Pennsylvania, United States
- Died: May 9, 2008 (aged 92) Johnstown, Pennsylvania, United States
- Party: Republican
- Spouse: John J. Clark
- Parent(s): John Pohl and Philomena (Boes) Pohl

M. Rita Clark (September 12, 1915 – May 9, 2008) was a Republican member of the Pennsylvania House of Representatives.

== Formative years and family ==
Born as M. Rita Pohl in Johnstown, Pennsylvania on September 12, 1915, M. Rita Clark was a daughter of John and Philomena (Boes) Pohl.

After graduating from Johnstown Catholic High School (now Bishop McCort High School) in 1933, she pursued higher education studies at the College of St. Francis (now the University of St. Francis) in Illinois from 1934 to 1935. She then earned her Bachelor of Science degree in English and social studies in 1937 at the State Teachers College in Lock Haven (now Lock Haven University of Pennsylvania), and received her teaching certificate from the University of Pittsburgh in 1938.

She married John J. Clark circa 1942.

== Career ==
Employed as a teacher at Edgewood Elementary School in Johnstown, Clark subsequently became a business owner, operating Clark’s Dairy Store in Hoernerstown, Pennsylvania.

Elected to the Johnstown city council, she served in that capacity from 1973 to 1979. She was then elected as a Republican to the Pennsylvania House of Representatives for the 1979 term. After running an unsuccessful campaign for reelection to the Pennsylvania House in 1980, she was appointed to the Governor’s Commission for Women (1981-1982) and the Pennsylvania Human Relations Commission (1985-1990).

== Community service ==
A lector and member of Visitation BVM Catholic Church's parish council and its Mother Seton Guild, Clark was also a senior peer counselor for the Society of Saint Vincent de Paul, a past president of the Johnstown Catholic Forum and the director, for a decade, of the Bishop McCort Alumni Association's annual fundraising drive.

A member of the League of Women Voters of Greater Johnstown, she served as secretary of the Johnstown Parking Authority, was a member of the board of directors of the Senior Activity Center of Johnstown and a member of the advisory board of the Salvation Army.

A member of the Johnstown Community Concert Association and the Mercy Hospital Guild, she was also actively involved with the Mercy-Lee Charity Ball Committee.

== Death and interment ==
Clark died on May 9, 2008 in Johnstown, and was interred at that city's Grandview Cemetery.
