= Jim Rigby =

American politician from Pennsylvania

Member of the Pennsylvania House of Representatives from the 71st district
- Incumbent
- Assumed office January 1, 2019
- Preceded by: Bryan Barbin

Personal details
- Party: Republican
- Spouse: Kathleen
- Children: 3
- Website: Official website

James Patrick Rigby is an American politician serving as a Republican member of the Pennsylvania House of Representatives for the 71st district since 2019.

== Biography ==
Rigby graduated from Ferndale Area High School and attended the police academy at the Greater Johnstown Career and Technology Center. After volunteering as a firefighter, he worked as a police officer and was named chief of police in Ferndale in 2015. He also served on the Ferndale Borough Council for 24 years, including 6 years as the council president.

In 2018, Rigby was elected to the Pennsylvania House of Representatives representing the 71st district, which includes parts of Cambria County and Somerset County. He defeated incumbent Democratic representative Bryan Barbin in the general election with 52% of the vote. He ran for reelection in 2020, 2022, and 2024 and did not have an opponent in any of the general elections.

He has three children with his wife Kathleen.

== Electoral History ==
Pennsylvania's House of Representatives 71nd District Republican Primary, 2018
Party	Candidate	Votes	%
Republican	James Rigby	1,999	49.26
Republican	Justin Capouellez	1,418	34.94
Republican	Matthew Sernell	641	15.80

Pennsylvania's House of Representatives 71nd District, 2018
Party	Candidate	Votes	%
Republican	James Rigby	11,414	52.01
Democratic	Bryan Barbin	10,531	47.99
Republican gain from Democratic			

Pennsylvania's House of Representatives 71nd District, 2020
Party	Candidate	Votes	%
Republican	James Rigby	26,240	100.00

Pennsylvania's House of Representatives 71nd District, 2022
Party	Candidate	Votes	%
Republican	James Rigby	20,034	100.00

Pennsylvania's House of Representatives 71nd District, 2024
Party	Candidate	Votes	%
Republican	James Rigby	25,996	100.00

=== 2024 Primary Election ===
The primary election was held on Tuesday, April 23, 2024. Rigby won 5,199 votes; 99.62% of all votes cast. He won all 52 precincts. 20 votes were cast as write-ins, which was 0.38% of the votes cast. Rigby received 100% of all votes cast in Cresson Township-South, making it one of his best precincts.

=== 2024 General Election ===
The general election was held on Tuesday, November 5, 2024. Rigby won 25,996 votes; 97.56% of all votes cast. He won all 52 precincts. 651 votes were cast as write-ins, which was 2.44% of the votes cast. Rigby received 99.40% of the votes cast in Reade Township, making it one of his best precincts.
