= State Correctional Institution – Cresson =

Correctional facility in Pennsylvania, US

Coordinates: 40°26′49″N 78°33′37″W

State Correctional Institution - Cresson
- Interactive map of State Correctional Institution - Cresson
- Location: Cresson Township, Cambria County, Pennsylvania
- Security class: Close-Security, Medium-Security
- Opened: 1987
- Closed: June 30, 2013
- Managed by: Pennsylvania Department of Corrections

State Correctional Institution – Cresson was an American medium-security, all male correctional facility, located in Cresson Township, Pennsylvania. It was situated off U.S. Route 22, about 10 miles (16 km) west of Altoona along Old Route 22 in the Western part of the commonwealth of Pennsylvania.

On January 8, 2013, state officials announced the prison would be closed. The prison closed June 30, 2013, and the land was put up for sale by the state.

== Creation of SCI-Cresson ==
Under Executive Order of then-Governor Dick Thornburgh in January 1983, This facility, formerly the Lawrence Frick State Hospital for the mentally ill, was to be transferred to the Bureau of Corrections for its use. The construction/renovation process at Cresson was allocated at $20.6 Million. Construction/renovation began in 1984, and the design of the new housing units for inmates was prototyped in future institutions across the Commonwealth. The activation team was created in the fall of 1986. SCI-Cresson opened in 1987, becoming a medium-security correctional facility for men.

== Notable inmates ==
- Joseph Kallinger - Serial killer and rapist; died in 1996
- John du Pont - Convicted murderer

== See also ==
- List of Pennsylvania state prisons
