= Edward P. Wojnaroski =

American politician (born 1939)

Edward P. Wojnaroski Sr.

Member of the Pennsylvania House of Representatives from the 71st district
- In office January 7, 1997 – November 30, 2008
- Preceded by: John Wozniak
- Succeeded by: Bryan Barbin

Personal details
- Born: July 22, 1939 (age 87) Johnstown, Pennsylvania
- Party: Democratic
- Spouse: Sandy Wojnaroski
- Children: 1 child

Edward P. Wojnaroski Sr. (born July 22, 1939) is a former Democratic member of the Pennsylvania House of Representatives, who represented the 71st District. He and his wife live in Johnstown, Pennsylvania and have 1 child. He retired prior to the 2008 election and was succeeded by Democrat Bryan Barbin.
