= Joseph McAneny =

American politician (1924–2007)

Joseph J. McAneny

Member of the Pennsylvania House of Representatives from the 71st district
- In office January 7, 1969 – November 30, 1970
- Preceded by: District Created
- Succeeded by: Patrick Gleason

Member of the Pennsylvania House of Representatives from the Cambria County district
- In office 1965–1968

Personal details
- Born: July 20, 1924
- Died: February 19, 2007 (aged 82)
- Party: Democratic

Joseph J. McAneny (July 20, 1924 – February 19, 2007) was a Democratic member of the Pennsylvania House of Representatives.
