= Lilly Bridge =

- U.S. National Register of Historic Places
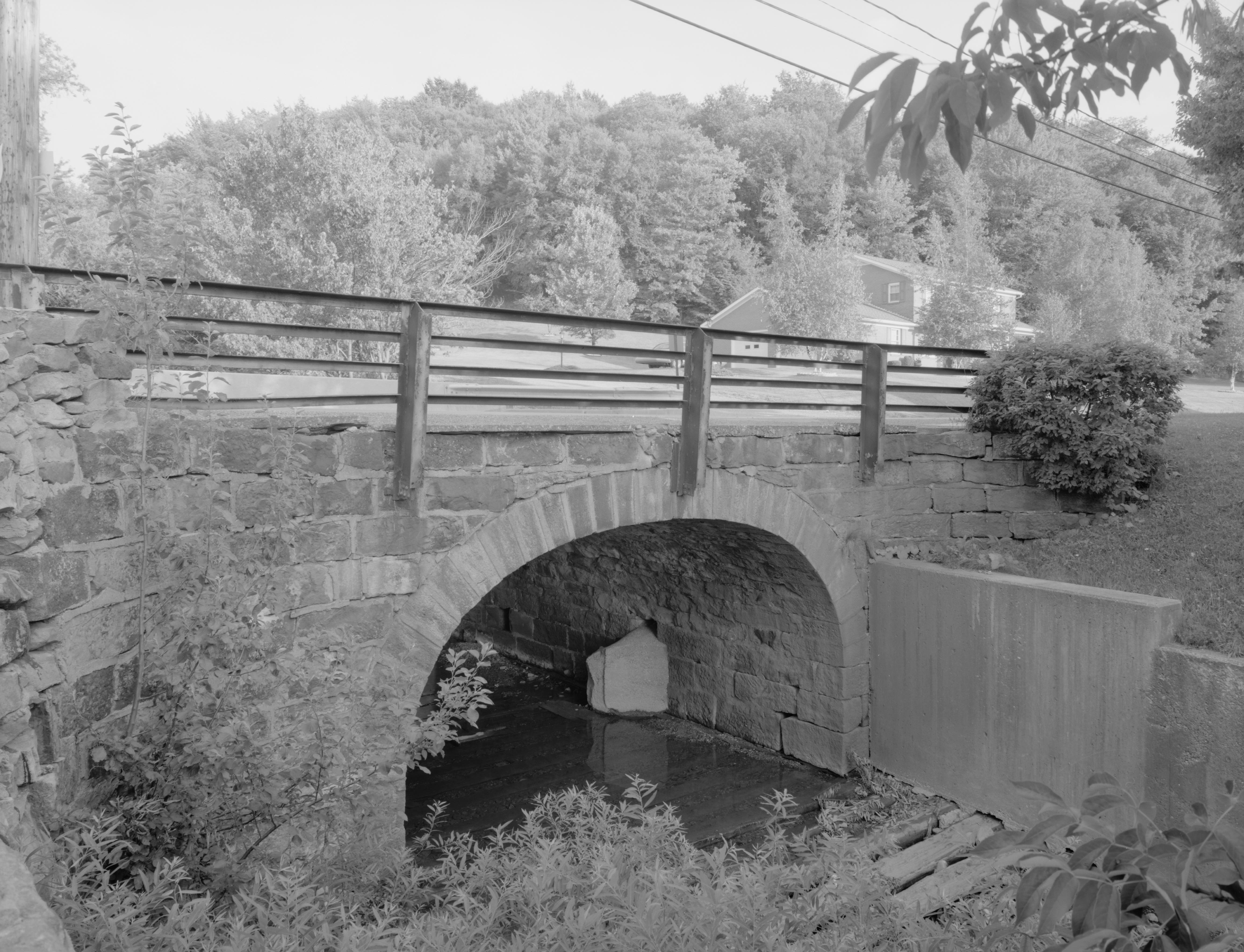
- Lilly Bridge, Summer 1997

- Location within Pennsylvania Location within the United States
- Location: PA 53 over Burgoon Run, Lilly, Pennsylvania
- Coordinates: 40°25′26″N 78°37′8″W
- Area: less than one acre
- Built: 1832
- Built by: Allegheny Portage Railroad
- Architectural style: Single span stone arch
- MPS: Highway Bridges Owned by the Commonwealth of Pennsylvania, Department of Transportation TR
- NRHP reference No.: 88000785
- Added to NRHP: June 22, 1988

Lilly Bridge is a historic stone arch bridge located at Lilly in Cambria County, Pennsylvania, United States. It was built by the Allegheny Portage Railroad in 1832, and is an 18-foot-long (5.5 m) bridge, with an elliptical shape and curved wingalls. It is built of roughly squared ashlar and crosses Burgoon Run.

It was listed on the National Register of Historic Places in 1988.

== See also ==
- List of bridges documented by the Historic American Engineering Record in Pennsylvania
