= Bryan Barbin =

American politician

Member of the Pennsylvania House of Representatives from the 71st district
- In office January 6, 2009 – January 1, 2019
- Preceded by: Edward Wojnaroski
- Succeeded by: James Rigby

Personal details
- Party: Democratic

Bryan Barbin is an American politician and lawyer who served in the Pennsylvania House of Representatives for District 71 from 2009 to 2019 as a Democrat. He resides in Johnstown and represented Cambria County.

On March 9, 2009, he introduced legislation for volunteer firefighters to pay for emergency medical services training.
