= Gallitzin Township, Pennsylvania =

Township in Pennsylvania, US

- Township
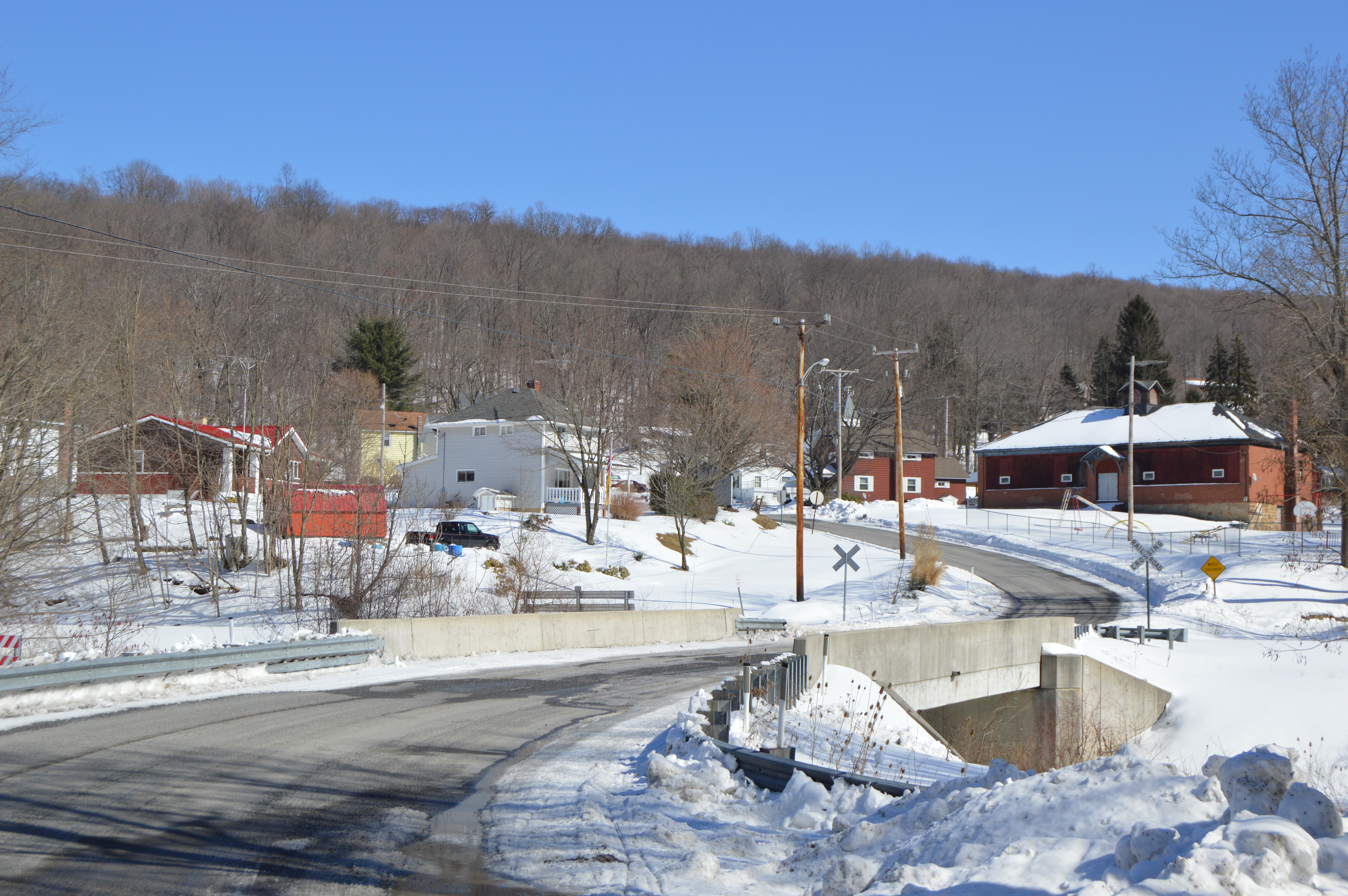
- Houses at Amsbry

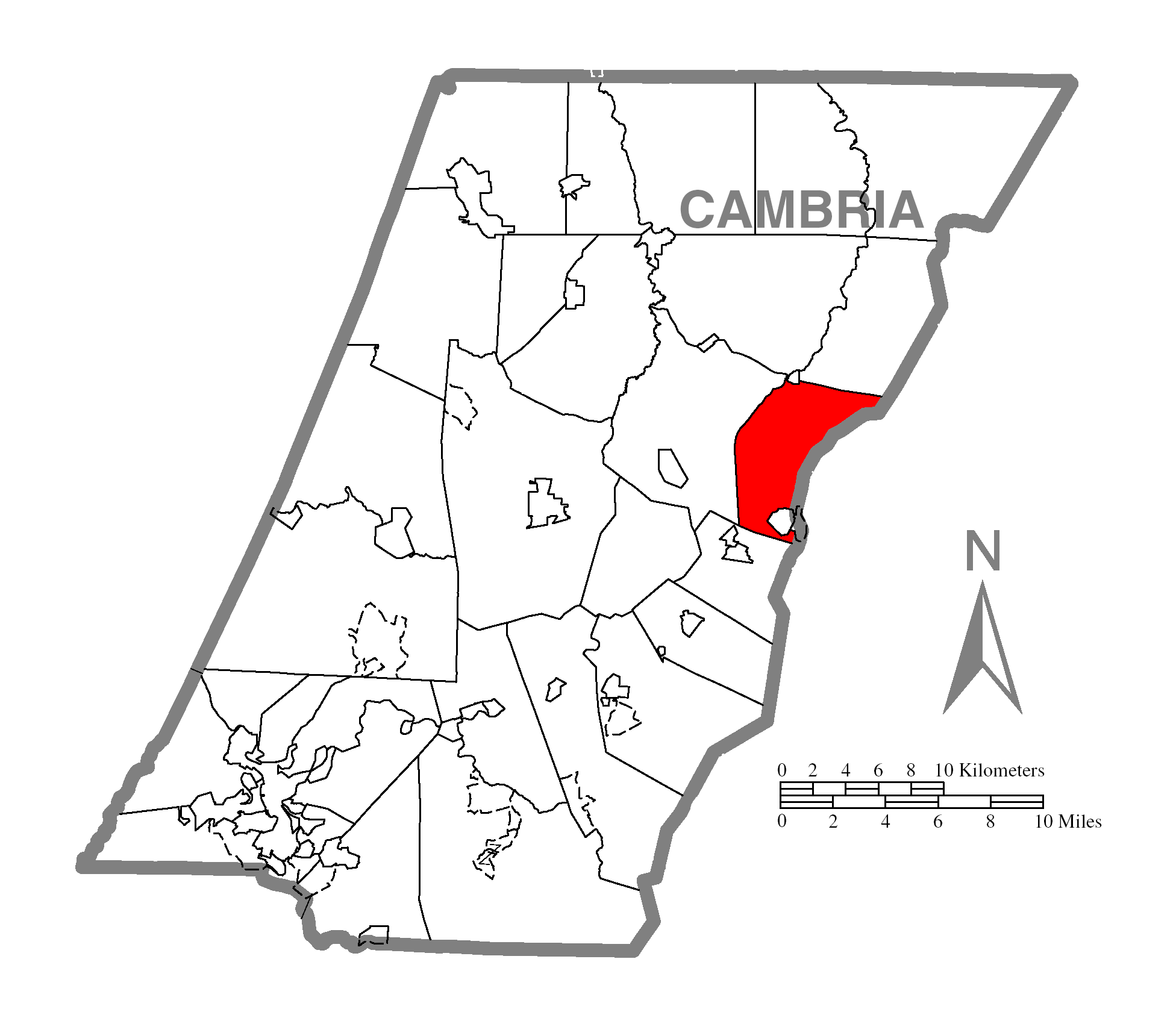
- Map of Cambria County, Pennsylvania highlighting Gallitzin Township

- Map of Cambria County, Pennsylvania
- Country: United States
- State: Pennsylvania
- County: Cambria
- Settled: 1800
- Incorporated: 1866

Area
  - Total: 17.10 sq mi (44.30 km^{2})
  - Land: 17.10 sq mi (44.30 km^{2})
  - Water: 0 sq mi (0.00 km^{2})

Population (2010)
  - Total: 1,324
  - Estimate (2016): 1,278
  - Density: 74.7/sq mi (28.85/km^{2})
- Time zone: UTC-5 (Eastern (EST))
  - Summer (DST): UTC-4 (EDT)
- Area code: 814
- FIPS code: 42-021-28336

Gallitzin Township is a township in Cambria County, Pennsylvania, United States. The township nearly surrounds, but is a separate entity from, Gallitzin borough. As of the 2010 census, the township population was 1,324. It is part of the Johnstown, Pennsylvania Metropolitan Statistical Area.

== Geography ==
The township is located in eastern Cambria County at 40°29′04″N 78°33′06″W, and is bordered by Blair County to the east. The borough of Gallitzin and part of the borough of Tunnelhill are next to the southeastern corner of the township, but are separate municipalities. The borough of Ashville touches the northwestern corner of the township.

Gallitzin Township is about 11 miles (18 km) east of Ebensburg, the Cambria County seat, and 12 miles (19 km) west of Altoona. According to the United States Census Bureau, the township has a total area of 17.1 square miles (44.3 km^{2}), all land.

== Communities ==
=== Unincorporated communities ===
- Amsbry
- Buckhorn
- Coupon
- Elstie
- Kaylor
- Spindley City
- Syberton

== Demographics ==
Historical population
| Census | Pop. | Note | %± |
|---|---|---|---|
| 2000 | 1,310 | | — |
| 2010 | 1,324 | | 1.1% |
| 2016 (est.) | 1,278 | | −3.5% |
U.S. Decennial Census

At the 2000 census there were 1,310 people, 452 households, and 363 families in the township. The population density was 77.2 inhabitants per square mile (29.8/km^{2}). There were 471 housing units at an average density of 27.8 per square mile (10.7/km^{2}). The racial makeup of the township was 99.24% White, 0.08% Native American, 0.08% from other races, and 0.61% from two or more races. Hispanic or Latino of any race were 0.31%.

There were 452 households, 40.5% had children under the age of 18 living with them, 66.8% were married couples living together, 6.6% had a female householder with no husband present, and 19.5% were non-families. 17.0% of households were made up of individuals, and 7.3% were one person aged 65 or older. The average household size was 2.90 and the average family size was 3.25.

The age distribution was 27.1% under the age of 18, 7.2% from 18 to 24, 31.5% from 25 to 44, 23.1% from 45 to 64, and 11.1% 65 or older. The median age was 37 years. For every 100 females there were 111.3 males. For every 100 females age 18 and over, there were 110.8 males.

The median household income was $31,790 and the median family income was $35,694. Males had a median income of $26,938 versus $17,386 for females. The per capita income for the township was $15,752. About 7.5% of families and 8.6% of the population were below the poverty line, including 7.9% of those under age 18 and 5.8% of those age 65 or over.

== Unincorporated community ==
- Coupon
