= Patrick A. Gleason =

American politician

Member of the Pennsylvania House of Representatives from the 71st district
- In office January 5, 1971 – November 30, 1976
- Preceded by: Joseph McAneny
- Succeeded by: Adam Bittinger

Personal details
- Born: July 30, 1934 Johnstown, Pennsylvania
- Died: February 17, 1982 (aged 47) Johnstown, Pennsylvania
- Party: Republican

Patrick A. Gleason (July 30, 1934 – February 17, 1982) was a Republican member of the Pennsylvania House of Representatives.

== Background ==
Gleason was born in Johnstown, Pennsylvania in 1934.

He earned his Bachelor of Science from Georgetown University in 1956 and his Juris Doctor from that same institution in 1959. An attorney, he served as the public defender for Cambria County in 1962. Elected as the city solicitor for Johnstown in 1967, he served in the capacity until 1970.

A Republican, he was then elected to the Pennsylvania House of Representatives for the 1971 term. During his three consecutive terms of service, he represented the House's 71st District (Cambria County). Opting not to run for reelection to the House in 1976, he ran an unsuccessful campaign for Pennsylvania Auditor General that same year.

== Illness, death and interment ==
Diagnosed with cancer, Gleason died in Johnstown in 1982 at the age of 47. He was interred at Johnstown's Grandview Cemetery.

Party political offices
Preceded by Franklin M. McCorkel	Republican nominee for Auditor General of Pennsylvania; 1976	Succeeded by James Knepper
