= Lilly, Pennsylvania =

Borough in Pennsylvania, US

- Borough
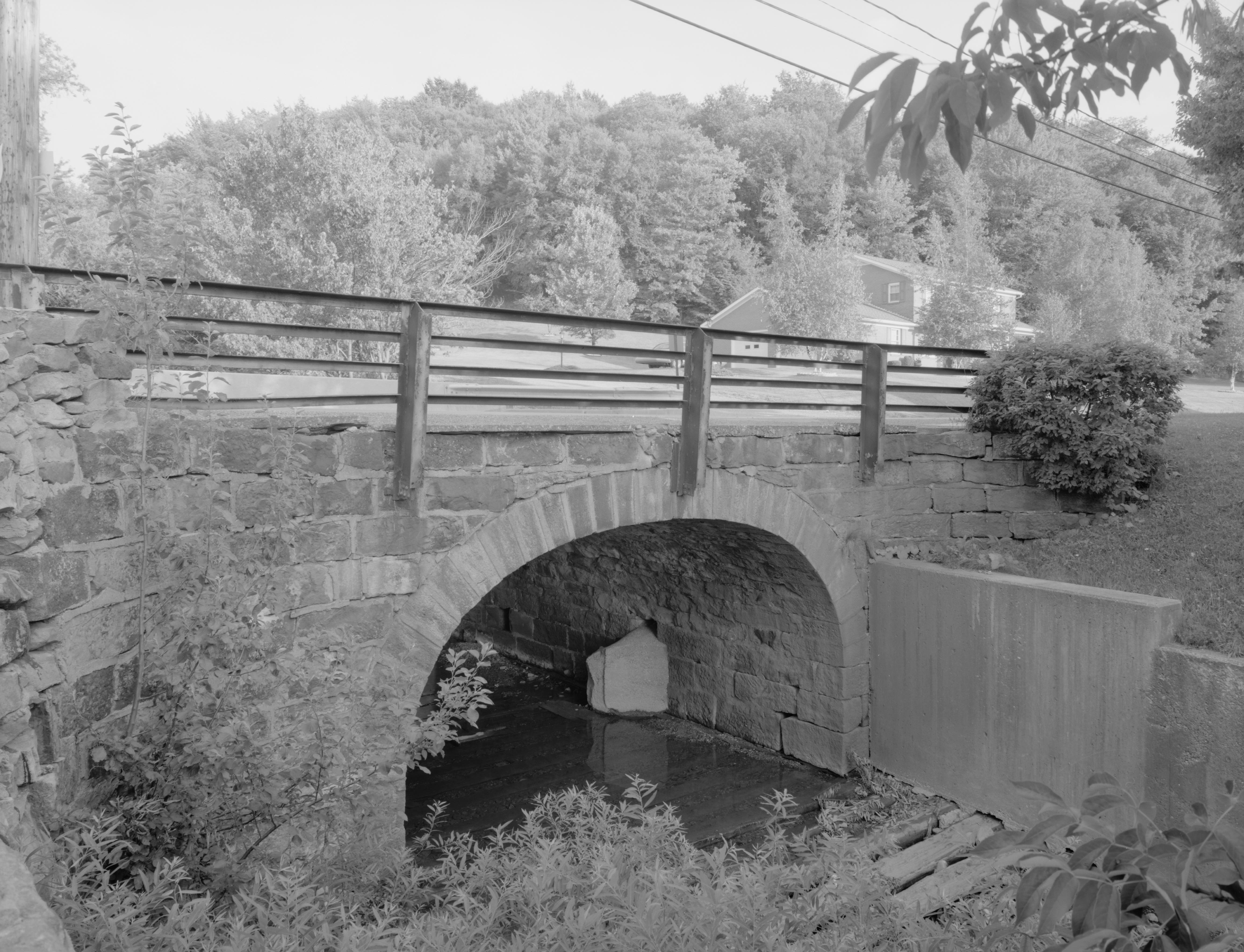
- The Lilly Bridge, a historic site in the borough

- Location of Lilly in Cambria County, Pennsylvania.

- Location within Pennsylvania
- Coordinates: 40°25′30″N 78°37′14″W
- Country: United States
- State: Pennsylvania
- County: Cambria
- Settled: 1806
- Incorporated: 1883

Government
  - Type: Borough council
  - Mayor: Michael Eckenrode

Area
  - Total: 0.52 sq mi (1.35 km^{2})
  - Land: 0.52 sq mi (1.35 km^{2})
  - Water: 0 sq mi (0.00 km^{2})
- Elevation: 1,896 ft (578 m)

Population (2020)
  - Total: 879
  - Density: 1,684/sq mi (650.1/km^{2})
- Time zone: UTC-5 (Eastern (EST))
  - Summer (DST): UTC-4 (EDT)
- ZIP code: 15938
- Area code: 814
- FIPS code: 42-43248
- GNIS feature ID: 1215026
- Website: https://lillyborough.net/

Lilly is a borough in Cambria County, Pennsylvania, United States. It is part of the Johnstown-Altoona Metropolitan Statistical Area. As of the 2020 census, Lilly had a population of 879.

== History ==
On April 5, 1924, a riot broke out in Lilly between approximately 400 members of the Ku Klux Klan and the local residents, who had previously torn down burning crosses erected to intimidate them. Three locals were killed when gunfire erupted on both sides. The Klansmen fled in a panic and were promptly arrested after arriving back in Johnstown. 29 Klansmen and 15 residents of Lilly were charged with unlawful assembly, affray, and riot. One Klansman, Owen H. Poorbaugh, died in jail while awaiting trial on April 25, 1924, at the age of 48. The rest were all sentenced to 2 years imprisonment.

The Lilly Bridge was listed on the National Register of Historic Places in 1988.

== Geography ==
Lilly is located in eastern Cambria County at 40°25′30″N 78°37′14″W (40.425000, -78.620434), in the valley of the Little Conemaugh River near its headwaters. Pennsylvania Route 53 passes through the borough, leading north 2 miles (3 km) to U.S. Route 22 near Cresson.

According to the United States Census Bureau, Lilly has a total area of 0.50 square miles (1.3 km^{2}), all land.

== Demographics ==
Historical population
Census	Pop.	Note	%±
1890	915		—
1900	1,276		39.5%
1910	1,638		28.4%
1920	2,346		43.2%
1930	2,163		−7.8%
1940	2,282		5.5%
1950	1,898		−16.8%
1960	1,642		−13.5%
1970	1,429		−13.0%
1980	1,462		2.3%
1990	1,162		−20.5%
2000	948		−18.4%
2010	968		2.1%
2020	879		−9.2%

As of the census of 2000, there were 948 people, 407 households, and 269 families residing in the borough. The population density was 1,952.4 people per square mile (753.8 people/km^{2}). There were 439 housing units at an average density of 904.1 per square mile (349.1/km^{2}). The racial makeup of the borough was 99.47% White, 0.21% Native American, 0.11% Asian, 0.11% Pacific Islander, and 0.11% from two or more races.

There were 407 households, out of which 23.3% had children under the age of 18 living with them, 49.1% were married couples living together, 12.8% had a female householder with no husband present, and 33.9% were non-families. 31.9% of all households were made up of individuals, and 17.7% had someone living alone who was 65 years of age or older. The average household size was 2.32 and the average family size was 2.91.

In the borough the population was spread out, with 18.8% under the age of 18, 7.4% from 18 to 24, 26.2% from 25 to 44, 26.8% from 45 to 64, and 20.9% who were 65 years of age or older. The median age was 44 years. For every 100 females there were 88.8 males. For every 100 females age 18 and over, there were 89.7 males.

The median income for a household in the borough was $27,917, and the median income for a family was $38,750. Males had a median income of $29,063 versus $18,929 for females. The per capita income for the borough was $15,984. About 3.8% of families and 7.8% of the population were below the poverty line, including 3.4% of those under age 18 and 12.7% of those age 65 or over.

== Central Mainline Sewer Authority ==
Sewage treatment in Lilly is provided by the Central Mainline Sewer Authority. A dedication ceremony was held on August 21, 2006, by local congressman John Murtha. Total costs of the system was $10 million, and construction took 14 years. Central Mainline serves over 2,000 customers.

== Education ==
It is in the Penn Cambria School District.
