= Sankertown, Pennsylvania =

Borough in Pennsylvania, US

- Borough
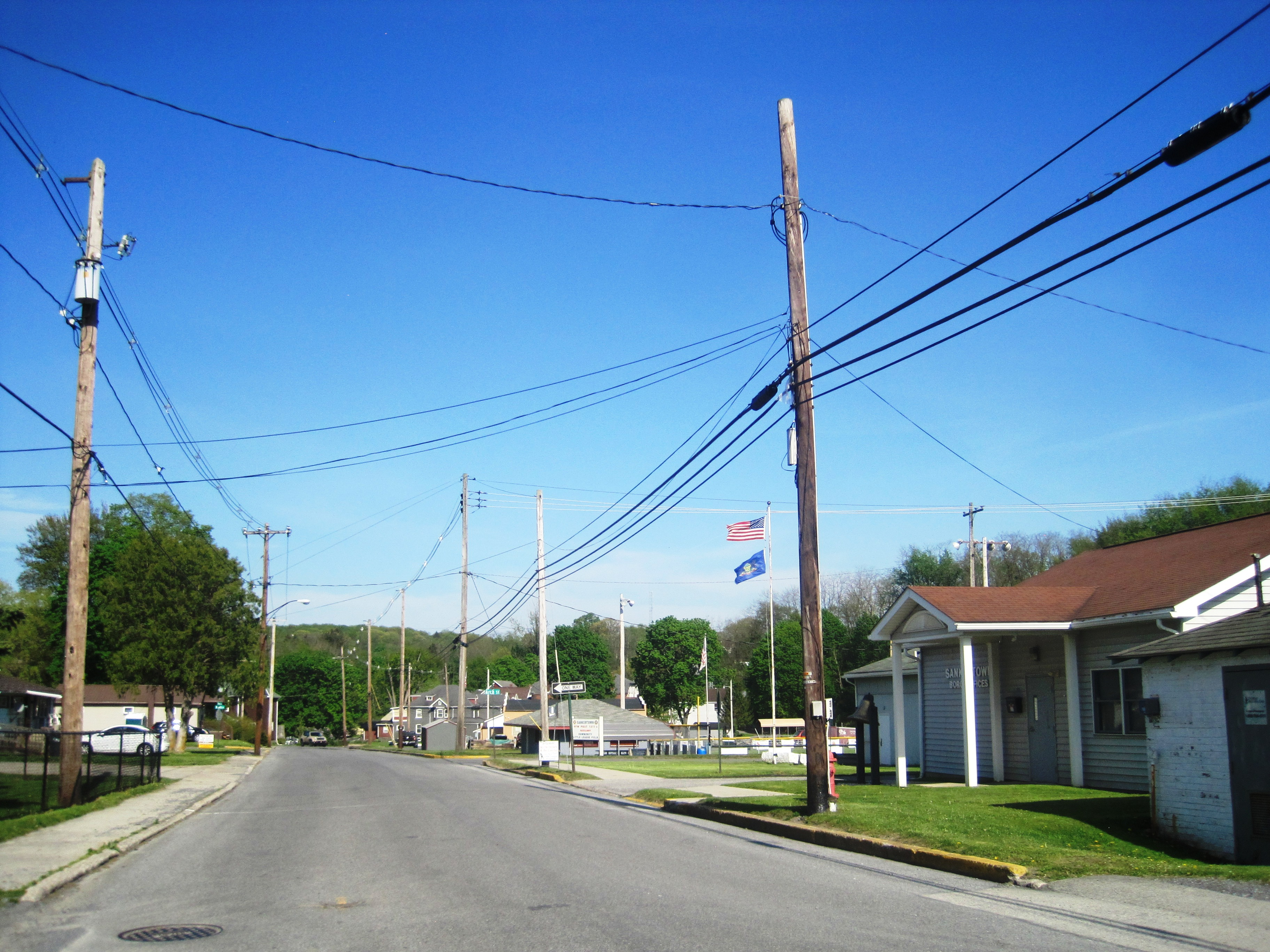
- Looking east along Pennsylvania Avenue

- Location of Sankertown in Cambria County, Pennsylvania.

- Location within Pennsylvania
- Coordinates: 40°28′12″N 78°35′31″W
- Country: United States
- State: Pennsylvania
- County: Cambria
- Incorporated: 1906

Government
  - Type: Borough council

Area
  - Total: 0.29 sq mi (0.76 km^{2})
  - Land: 0.29 sq mi (0.76 km^{2})
  - Water: 0 sq mi (0.00 km^{2})
- Elevation: 2,060 ft (630 m)

Population (2010)
  - Total: 675
  - Estimate (2019): 614
  - Density: 2,081.1/sq mi (803.51/km^{2})
- Time zone: UTC-5 (Eastern (EST))
  - Summer (DST): UTC-4 (EDT)
- ZIP code: 16630
- Area code: 814
- FIPS code: 42-67920
- GNIS feature ID: 1215032

Sankertown is a borough in Cambria County, Pennsylvania, United States. It is part of the Johnstown, Pennsylvania Metropolitan Statistical Area. As of the 2020 census, Sankertown had a population of 630.

== Geography ==
Sankertown is located in eastern Cambria County at 40°28′12″N 78°35′31″W (40.470113, -78.592050). It is bordered to the south by the borough of Cresson and is 8 miles (13 km) east of Ebensburg, the county seat. According to the United States Census Bureau, the borough has a total area of 0.29 square miles (0.76 km^{2}), all land.

Sankertown has a basketball court and a baseball field.

== Demographics ==
Historical population
Census	Pop.	Note	%±
1910	687		—
1920	900		31.0%
1930	917		1.9%
1940	942		2.7%
1950	865		−8.2%
1960	828		−4.3%
1970	881		6.4%
1980	804		−8.7%
1990	770		−4.2%
2000	680		−11.7%
2010	675		−0.7%
2020	630		−6.7%

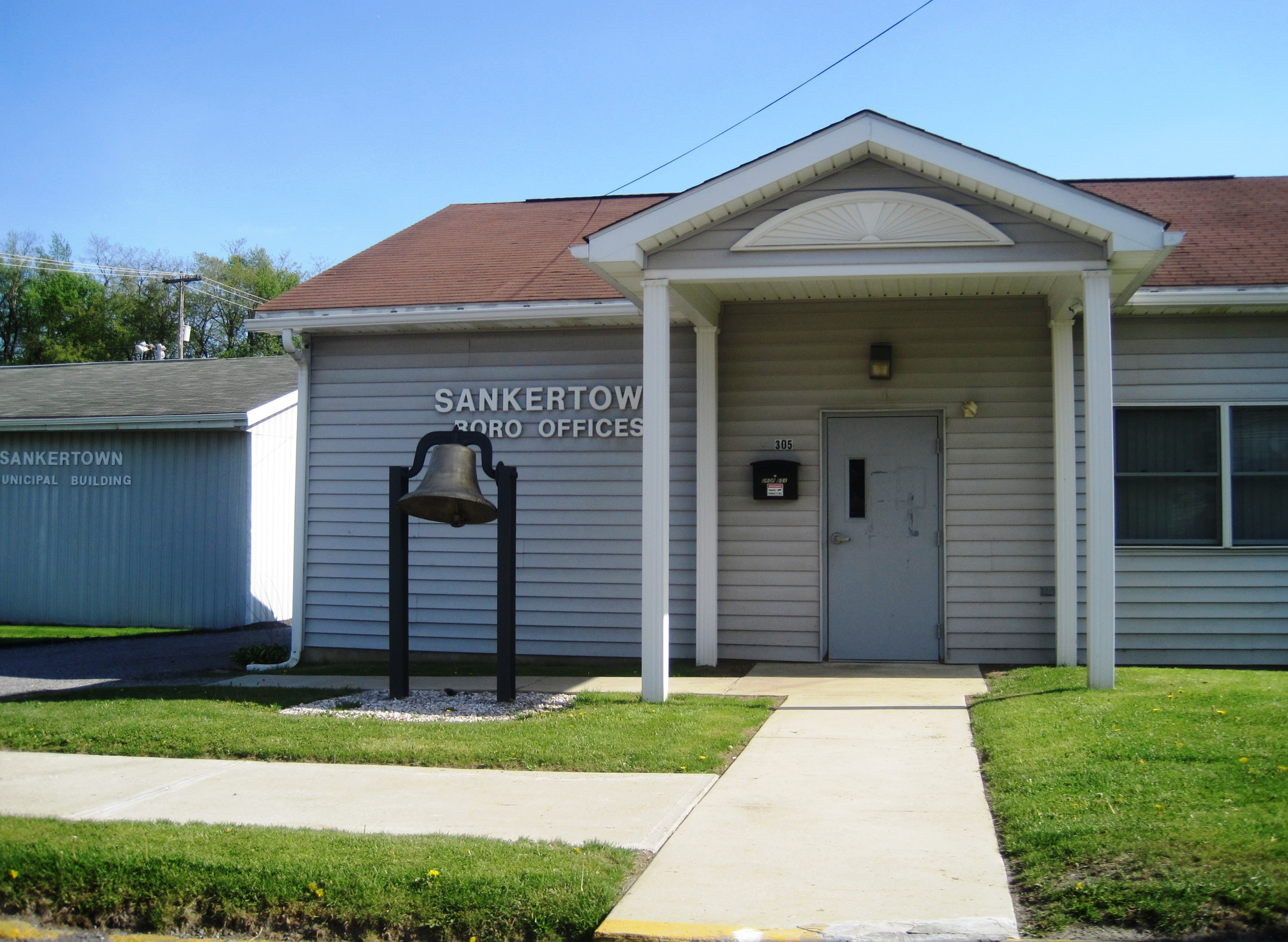
Borough offices

As of the census of 2000, there were 680 people, 248 households, and 177 families residing in the borough. The population density was 2,434.4 inhabitants per square mile (939.9/km^{2}). There were 265 housing units at an average density of 948.7 per square mile (366.3/km^{2}). The racial makeup of the borough was 99.12% White, 0.44% African American, 0.29% Asian, and 0.15% from two or more races. Hispanic or Latino of any race were 0.29% of the population.

There were 248 households, out of which 28.2% had children under the age of 18 living with them, 54.0% were married couples living together, 12.9% had a female householder with no husband present, and 28.6% were non-families. 24.6% of all households were made up of individuals, and 8.1% had someone living alone who was 65 years of age or older. The average household size was 2.63 and the average family size was 3.06.

In the borough the population was spread out, with 21.0% under the age of 18, 9.9% from 18 to 24, 27.4% from 25 to 44, 26.5% from 45 to 64, and 15.3% who were 65 years of age or older. The median age was 40 years. For every 100 females there were 101.2 males. For every 100 females age 18 and over, there were 96.7 males.

The median income for a household in the borough was $35,208, and the median income for a family was $42,143. Males had a median income of $31,172 versus $17,333 for females. The per capita income for the borough was $13,728. About 9.2% of families and 10.6% of the population were below the poverty line, including 16.5% of those under age 18 and 10.0% of those age 65 or over.

== Education ==
It is in the Penn Cambria School District.
