= Tunnelhill, Pennsylvania =

Borough in Pennsylvania, US

- Borough
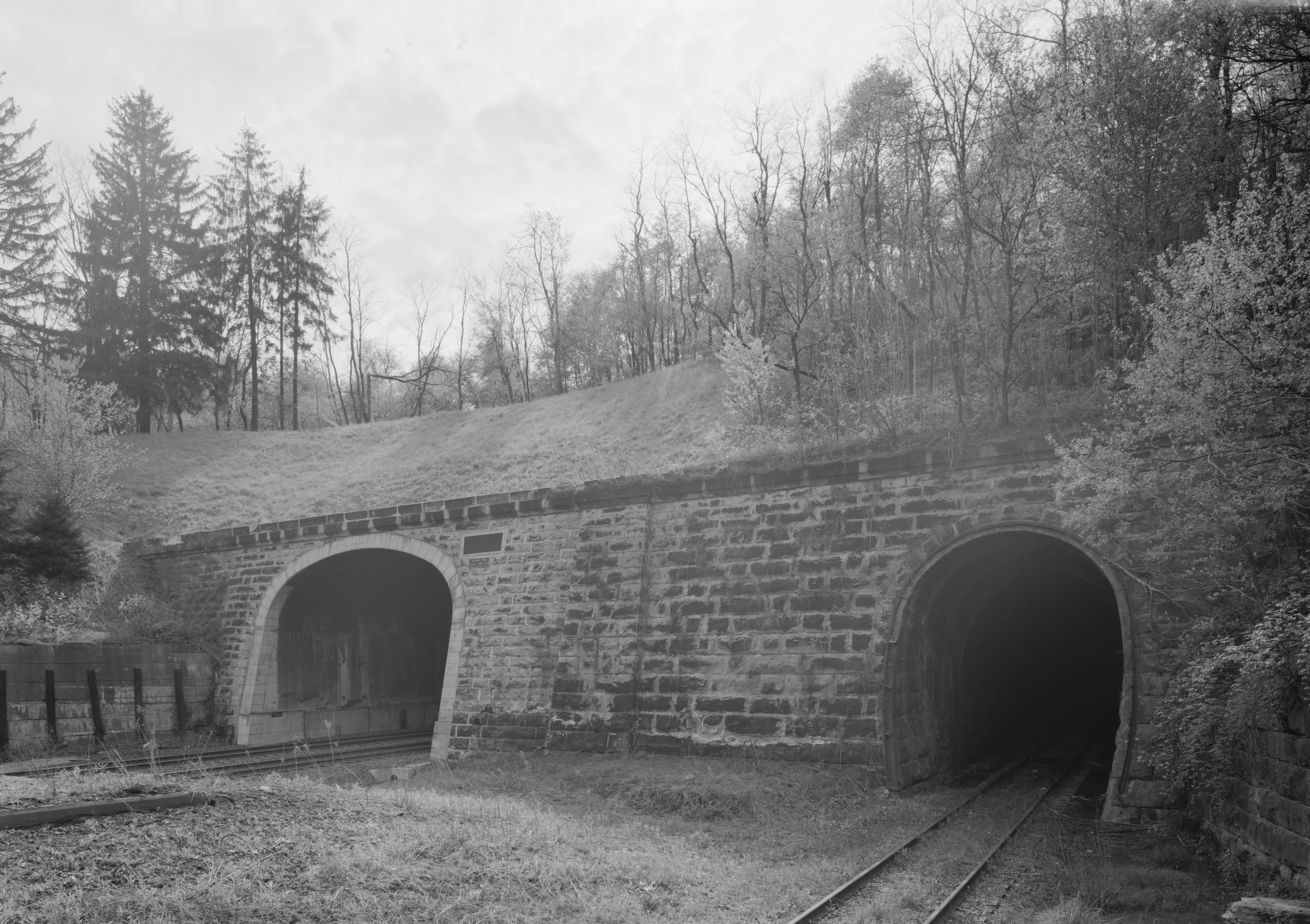
- Eastern portals of the Gallitzin Tunnel in Tunnelhill

- Location of Tunnelhill in Blair County, Pennsylvania.

- Location within Pennsylvania
- Coordinates: 40°28′39″N 78°32′29″W
- Country: United States
- State: Pennsylvania
- Counties: Blair and Cambria
- Incorporated: 1876

Government
  - Type: Borough Council

Area
  - Total: 0.49 sq mi (1.28 km^{2})
  - Land: 0.49 sq mi (1.28 km^{2})
  - Water: 0 sq mi (0.00 km^{2})
- Elevation: 2,323 ft (708 m)

Population (2020)
  - Total: 315
  - Density: 636.6/sq mi (245.79/km^{2})
- Time zone: UTC-5 (Eastern (EST))
  - Summer (DST): UTC-4 (EDT)
- Zip code: 16641
- Area code: 814
- FIPS code: 42-77808
- GNIS feature ID: 1217320

Tunnelhill is a borough that is located in Cambria and Blair counties in Pennsylvania, United States. As of the 2020 census, Tunnelhill had a population of 315. It is part of the Altoona, PA Metropolitan Statistical Area. Tunnelhill is named after the many railroad tunnels of the Pennsylvania Railroad near here known as the Gallitzin Tunnels.

== Geography ==
According to the United States Census Bureau, the borough has a total area of 0.5 square miles (1.3 km^{2}), all land.

Tunnelhill has the third-highest elevation among towns in Pennsylvania, at 2300 feet.

== Demographics ==
Historical population
Census	Pop.	Note	%±
1880	224		—
1890	730		225.9%
1900	674		−7.7%
1910	661		−1.9%
1920	619		−6.4%
1930	690		11.5%
1940	625		−9.4%
1950	535		−14.4%
1960	463		−13.5%
1970	508		9.7%
1980	513		1.0%
1990	365		−28.8%
2000	409		12.1%
2010	363		−11.2%
2020	315		−13.2%
U.S. Decennial Census

As of the census of 2000, there were 409 people, 178 households, and 100 families living in the borough. The population density was 844.4 inhabitants per square mile (326.0/km^{2}). There were 188 housing units at an average density of 388.1 units per square mile (149.8 units/km^{2}). The racial makeup of the borough was 98.78% White, 0.24% Native American, 0.24% Asian, 0.24% Pacific Islander, and 0.49% from two or more races.

There were 178 households, out of which 23.0% had children under the age of 18 living with them, 42.1% were married couples living together, 8.4% had a female householder with no husband present, and 43.8% were non-families. 38.8% of all households were made up of individuals, and 21.9% had someone living alone who was 65 years of age or older. The average household size was 2.27 and the average family size was 3.09.

In the borough the population was spread out, with 19.8% under the age of 18, 8.1% from 18 to 24, 23.7% from 25 to 44, 24.0% from 45 to 64, and 24.4% who were 65 years of age or older. The median age was 44 years. For every 100 females there were 88.5 males. For every 100 females age 18 and over, there were 87.4 males.

The median income for a household in the borough was $22,604, and the median income for a family was $34,500. Males had a median income of $23,500 versus $16,250 for females. The per capita income for the borough was $13,042. About 10.4% of families and 16.9% of the population were below the poverty line, including 22.2% of those under age 18 and 10.3% of those age 65 or over.

== Education ==
It is in the Penn Cambria School District.
