= Cassandra, Pennsylvania =

Borough in Pennsylvania, US

- Borough
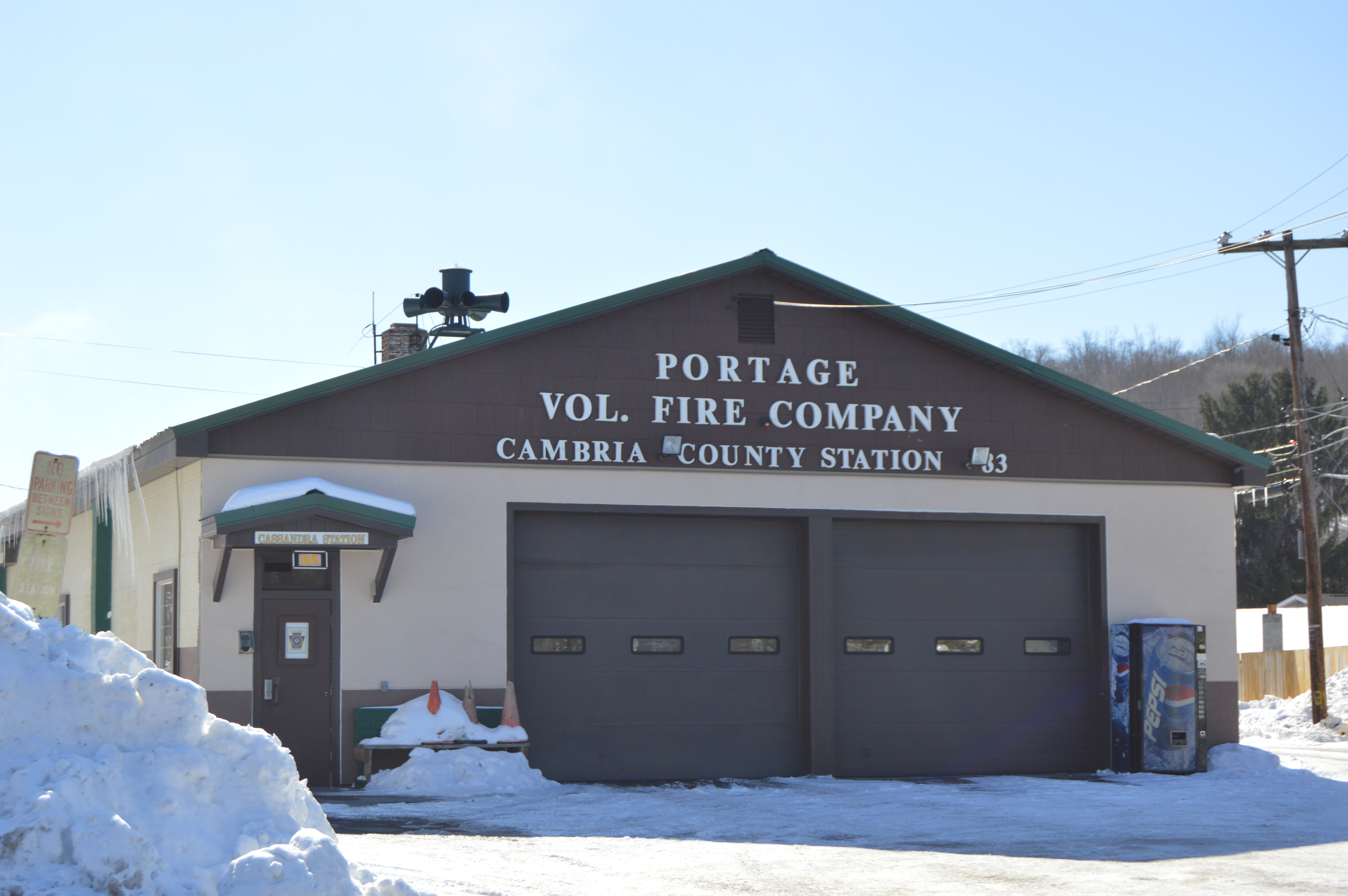
- Community fire hall

- Location of Cassandra in Cambria County, Pennsylvania.

- Location within Pennsylvania
- Coordinates: 40°24′32″N 78°38′28″W
- Country: United States
- State: Pennsylvania
- County: Cambria
- Incorporated: 1908

Government
  - Type: Borough council

Area
  - Total: 0.081 sq mi (0.21 km^{2})
  - Land: 0.081 sq mi (0.21 km^{2})
  - Water: 0 sq mi (0.00 km^{2})
- Elevation: 1,801 ft (549 m)

Population (2020)
  - Total: 162
  - Density: 2,020.3/sq mi (780.05/km^{2})
- Time zone: UTC-5 (Eastern (EST))
  - Summer (DST): UTC-4 (EDT)
- Zip code: 15925
- Area code: 814
- FIPS code: 42-11616
- GNIS feature ID: 1215012

Cassandra is a borough in Cambria County, Pennsylvania, United States. As of the 2020 census, Cassandra had a population of 162. It is part of the Johnstown, Pennsylvania Metropolitan Statistical Area.

== Geography ==
Cassandra is located in eastern Cambria County at 40°24′32″N 78°38′28″W (40.408989, -78.641040), in the valley of the Little Conemaugh River. Pennsylvania Route 53 passes just south of the borough limits, leading northeast 5 miles (8 km) to Cresson and southwest 3 miles (5 km) to Portage. Ebensburg, the county seat, is 11 miles (18 km) to the northwest, Altoona is 23 miles (37 km) to the northeast, and Johnstown is 23 miles (37 km) to the southwest.

According to the United States Census Bureau, Cassandra has a total area of 0.08 square miles (0.2 km^{2}), all land.

== Demographics ==
Historical population
| Census | Pop. | Note | %± |
|---|---|---|---|
| 1910 | 306 | | — |
| 1920 | 467 | | 52.6% |
| 1930 | 419 | | −10.3% |
| 1940 | 514 | | 22.7% |
| 1950 | 381 | | −25.9% |
| 1960 | 270 | | −29.1% |
| 1970 | 250 | | −7.4% |
| 1980 | 238 | | −4.8% |
| 1990 | 192 | | −19.3% |
| 2000 | 136 | | −29.2% |
| 2010 | 147 | | 8.1% |
| 2020 | 162 | | 10.2% |

As of the census of 2000, there were 136 people, 54 households, and 36 families residing in the borough. The population density was 1,812.3 inhabitants per square mile (699.7/km^{2}). There were 57 housing units at an average density of 759.6 per square mile (293.3/km^{2}). The racial makeup of the borough was 100.00% White.

There were 54 households, out of which 33.3% had children under the age of 18 living with them, 50.0% were married couples living together, 11.1% had a female householder with no husband present, and 33.3% were non-families. 27.8% of all households were made up of individuals, and 18.5% had someone living alone who was 65 years of age or older. The average household size was 2.50 and the average family size was 3.03.

In the borough the population was spread out, with 22.8% under the age of 18, 2.2% from 18 to 24, 35.3% from 25 to 44, 19.9% from 45 to 64, and 19.9% who were 65 years of age or older. The median age was 38 years. For every 100 females there were 106.1 males. For every 100 females age 18 and over, there were 101.9 males.

The median income for a household in the borough was $28,750, and the median income for a family was $40,833. Males had a median income of $19,063 versus $20,625 for females. The per capita income for the borough was $14,004. There were no families and 8.2% of the population living below the poverty line, including no under eighteens and 11.4% of those over 64.

== Central Mainline Sewer Authority ==
Sewage Treatment in Cassandra Boro is provided by the Central Mainline Sewer Authority. A dedication ceremony was held on August 21, 2006, by local congressman John Murtha. The total cost of the system was $10 million and took 14 years. Central-Mainline Serves over 2,000 customers and is named after the "Mainline" of the former Pennsylvania Railroad that proceed through the five municipalities. The railway is now part of the Norfolk Southern system.

== Transportation ==
Norfolk Southern operates on the former Pennsylvania Railroad mainline between Pittsburgh and Harrisburg. There is a bridge called the Cassandra Overlook Bridge where train watchers can watch trains in a convenient location. This bridge is a single-lane old iron pedestrian bridge that once paralleled the bridge that carried State Route 53 traffic across the railroad. The route was bypassed with the current alignment of Route 53 in 1936. Railfans are most welcome at this location. There is a small motel, the Cassandra Railroad Overlook Motel, in town that welcomes visitors and railfans.

There are no traffic lights in the Borough of Cassandra. Only two streets run through the borough—Main Street, which is a dead-end at both ends, and Portage Street, which runs from State Route 53 to Main Street.
