= Washington Township, Cambria County, Pennsylvania =

Township in Pennsylvania, US

- Township
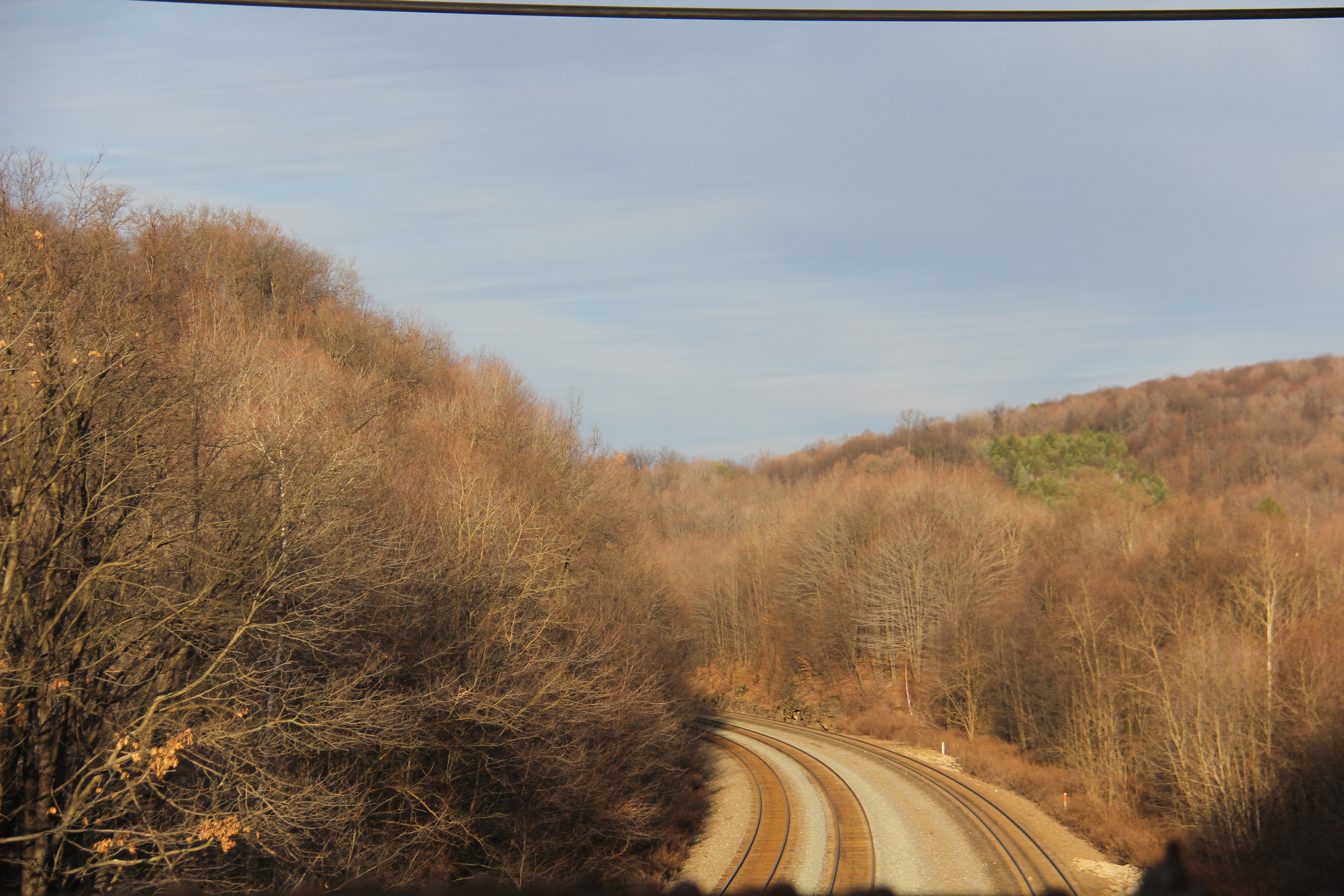
- View of the Pittsburgh Line in Washington Township

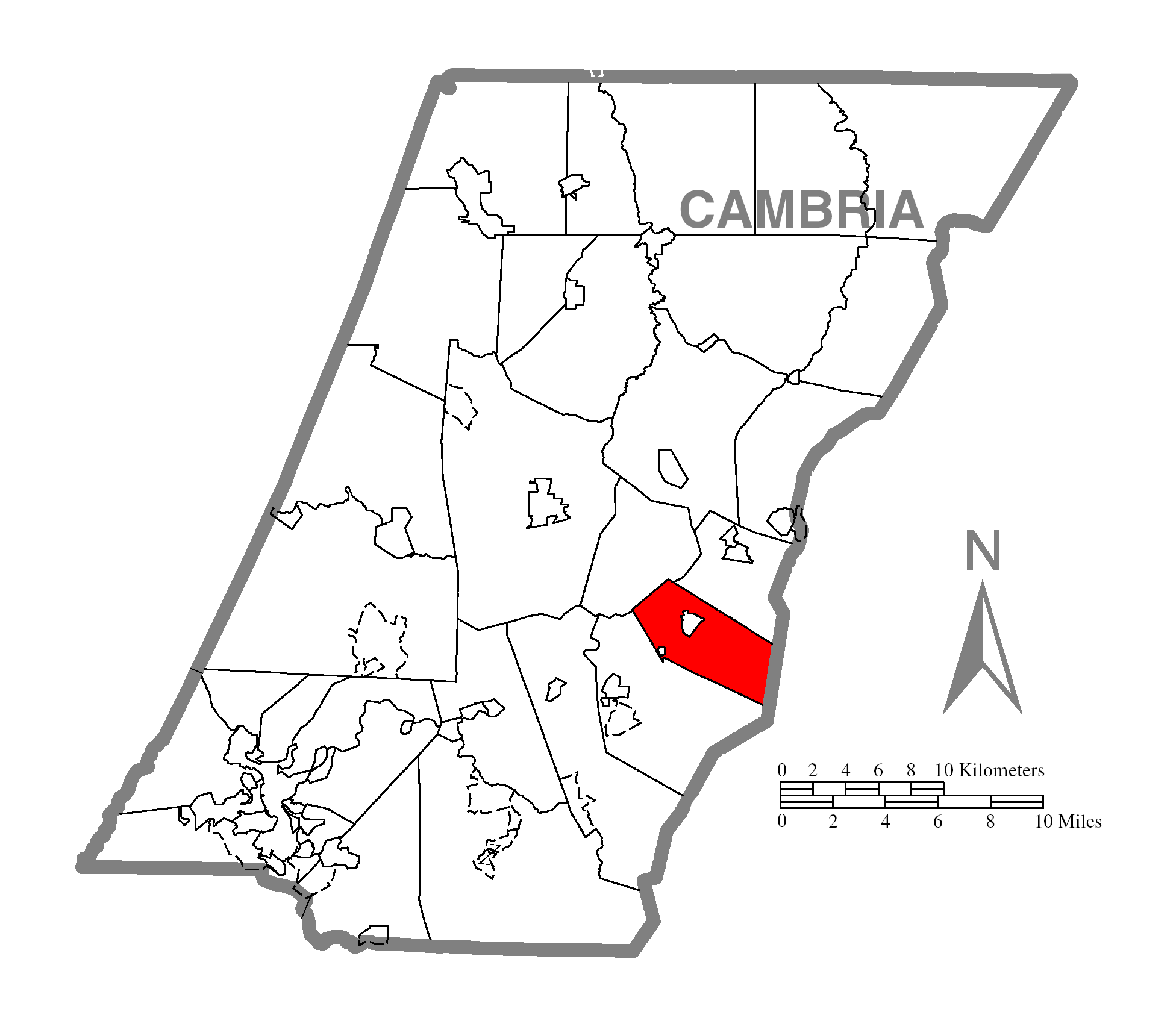
- Map of Cambria County, Pennsylvania highlighting Washington Township

- Map of Cambria County, Pennsylvania
- Country: United States
- State: Pennsylvania
- County: Cambria
- Incorporated: 1834

Area
  - Total: 12.58 sq mi (32.57 km^{2})
  - Land: 12.56 sq mi (32.52 km^{2})
  - Water: 0.019 sq mi (0.05 km^{2})

Population (2010)
  - Total: 875
  - Estimate (2016): 859
  - Density: 68.4/sq mi (26.42/km^{2})
- Time zone: UTC-5 (Eastern (EST))
  - Summer (DST): UTC-4 (EDT)
- Area code: 814
- FIPS code: 42-021-81200

Washington Township is a township in Cambria County, Pennsylvania, United States. As of the 2010 census, the township population was 875. It is part of the Johnstown, Pennsylvania Metropolitan Statistical Area.

== Geography ==
Washington Township is located along the eastern edge of Cambria County at approximately 40.3°N by 78.62°W, bordered by Blair County to the east. The township surrounds the borough of Lilly but is separate from it. The borough of Cassandra is along the township's southwestern border. Ebensburg, the Cambria County seat, is 9 miles (14 km) to the northwest, and Altoona is 20 miles (32 km) to the northeast.

According to the United States Census Bureau, Washington Township has a total area of 12.6 square miles (32.6 km^{2}), of which 0.019 square miles (0.05 km^{2}), or 0.15%, is water. The Little Conemaugh River flows southwestward across the northwestern part of the township.

== Communities ==
=== Unincorporated communities ===
- Lilly Coal
- Lower Dutchtown
- Moshannon
- Plane Blank
- Scanlon Hill
- Upper Dutchtown
- Wheelers Hill

== Demographics ==
Historical population
Census	Pop.	Note	%±
2000	921		—
2010	875		−5.0%
2016 (est.)	859		−1.8%
U.S. Decennial Census

As of the census of 2000, there were 921 people, 351 households, and 265 families residing in the township. The population density was 71.2 inhabitants per square mile (27.5/km^{2}). There were 370 housing units at an average density of 28.6 per square mile (11.0/km^{2}). The racial makeup of the township was 99.24% White, and 0.76% from two or more races. Hispanic or Latino of any race were 0.76% of the population.

There were 351 households, out of which 30.8% had children under the age of 18 living with them, 62.4% were married couples living together, 7.4% had a female householder with no husband present, and 24.5% were non-families. 23.9% of all households were made up of individuals, and 15.1% had someone living alone who was 65 years of age or older. The average household size was 2.62 and the average family size was 3.11.

In the township the population was spread out, with 22.8% under the age of 18, 8.0% from 18 to 24, 25.2% from 25 to 44, 25.7% from 45 to 64, and 18.2% who were 65 years of age or older. The median age was 42 years. For every 100 females there were 98.5 males. For every 100 females age 18 and over, there were 101.4 males.

The median income for a household in the township was $35,000, and the median income for a family was $40,602. Males had a median income of $29,545 versus $21,083 for females. The per capita income for the township was $16,563. About 1.5% of families and 3.5% of the population were below the poverty line, including none of those under age 18 and 8.1% of those age 65 or over.

== Sewage treatment ==
Sewage treatment in portions of the township is provided by the Central Mainline Sewer Authority. A dedication ceremony was held on August 21, 2006, by local congressman John Murtha. The total cost of the system was $10 million, and construction took 14 years. Central-Mainline serves over 2,000 customers and is named after the "Mainline" of the former Pennsylvania Railroad that proceeds through the five municipalities. The railway is now part of the Norfolk Southern system.
