= Moxham =

Moxham may refer to:

- Moxham in Johnstown, Pennsylvania, see also Moxham Historic District

People

- Billy Moxham (1886-1959) Australian rules footballer
- George Churchill Moxham (1892-1955) Businessman and politician of British Columbia
- Roy Moxham British writer
- Phil Moxham, musician in the post-punk band Young Marble Giants
