= Minersville Historic District =

Historic district in Pennsylvania, United States

- U.S. National Register of Historic Places
- U.S. Historic district
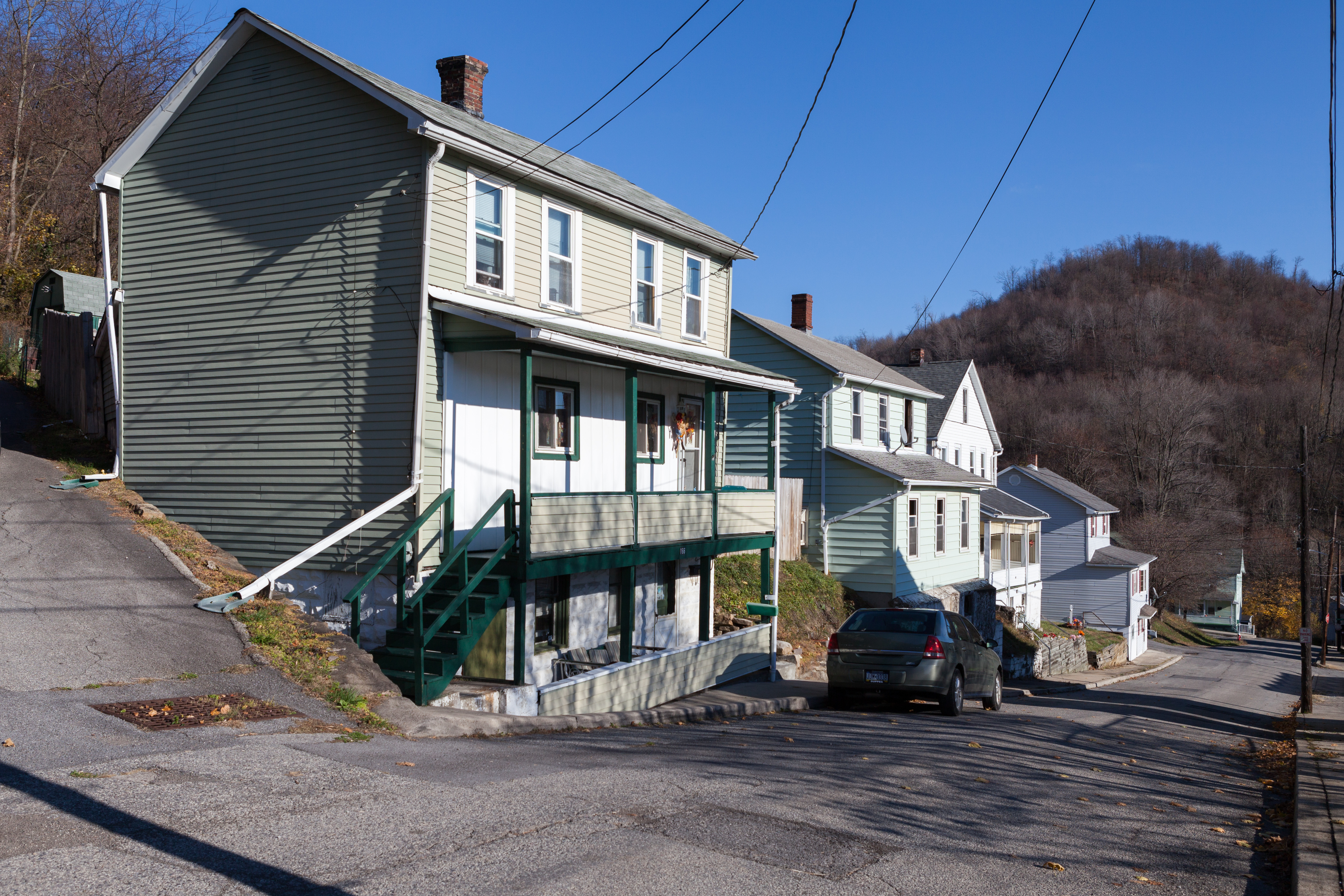
- 166 Benshoff St, in the district

- Location within Pennsylvania Location within the United States
- Location: Roughly, along Connelly Ave., Honan Ave., Garvey Pl. and Iron St., Johnstown and West Taylor Townships, Johnstown, Pennsylvania
- Coordinates: 40°20′34.1″N 78°55′35.01″W
- Area: 13.4 acres (5.4 ha)
- Built: 1881
- Built by: Hoover and Hughes Contracting Co.
- NRHP reference No.: 95000522
- Added to NRHP: April 27, 1995

Minersville Historic District is a national historic district located at Johnstown in Cambria County, Pennsylvania, United States. The district is a working-class neighborhood of privately and company built housing running along the north side of the Conemaugh River.

It was listed on the National Register of Historic Places in 1995. That same year, the district was selected as a training site for undergraduate researchers by the University of Pittsburgh at Johnstown.

== History ==
The district is one of several in the Johnstown area, all are typical nineteenth century western Pennsylvania industrial communities, including Cambria City, Moxham, and Old Conemaugh. Minersville was primarily associated with the former Cambria Iron Lower Works.

The Minersville Historic District consists of 92 residences and one fraternal club, all built between 1880 and 1945, though the strongest growth came in the early 1900s. Due to its hillside location, Minersville survived the 1889 Johnstown Flood.
