= Moxham Historic District =

Historic district in Pennsylvania, United States

- U.S. National Register of Historic Places
- U.S. Historic district
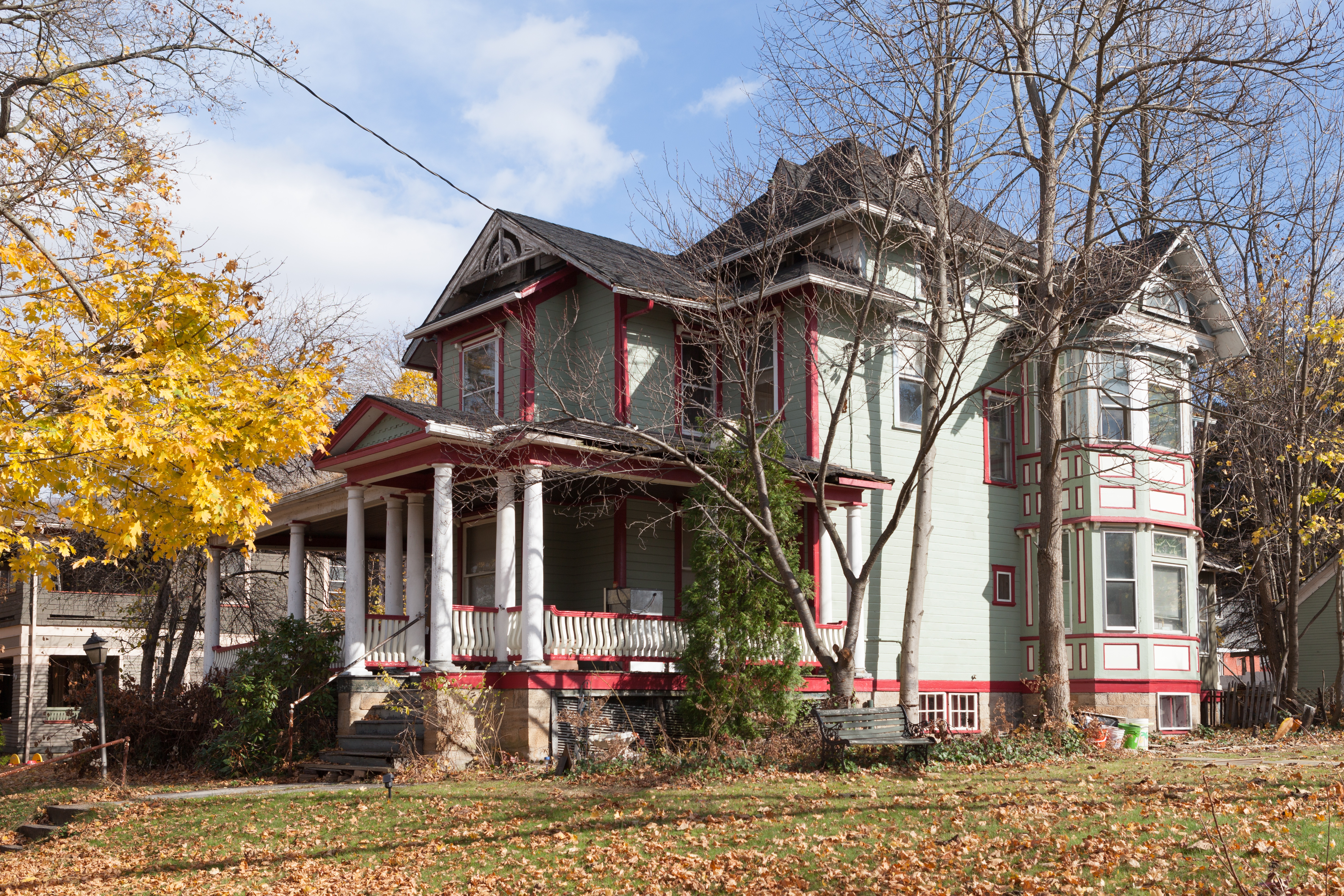
- Cauffiel House, an 1865 Queen Anne style urban homestead in the district

- Location within Pennsylvania Location within the United States
- Location: Roughly bounded by Dupont St., Linden Av., Village St., Park and Coleman Avs., Johnstown, Pennsylvania
- Coordinates: 40°17′52″N 78°54′30″W
- Area: 70 acres (28 ha)
- Built: 1889
- Architect: Walter R. Myton, Grodavent Bros.
- Architectural style: Bungalow/craftsman, Colonial Revival, Four Square
- NRHP reference No.: 99000324
- Added to NRHP: March 12, 1999

The Moxham Historic District is a national historic district that is located in Johnstown in Cambria County, Pennsylvania, United States.

Moxham was listed on the National Register of Historic Places in 1999.

== History and architectural features ==
This district includes 330 contributing buildings that are located in a predominantly residential area in southern Johnstown. There are 315 contributing dwellings, seventeen former carriage house/horse barns, twenty-one commercial buildings, ten churches, and one former school. The district includes five contributing buildings that date prior to the Johnstown Flood, but the majority date from 1890 to 1930. The dwellings include notable examples of popular architectural styles including Bungalow/craftsman, Colonial Revival, and American Foursquare. Notable non-residential buildings include St. Patrick's Catholic Church (1905), the former Calvary Methodist Church (1894), Allegheny Wesleyan Methodist Church (1898), Grove Avenue Methodist Church (1902), Second Presbyterian Church (1914), and the former Cypress Avenue School (1900).

The Moxham district is typical of nineteenth-century, western Pennsylvania industrial communities, in this instance growing around the Johnston Steel Street Rail Company. The district was designed for a variety of social levels, whereas most nearby neighborhoods such as Cambria City, Minersville, and Old Conemaugh were created strictly for blue-collar workers. Moxham was built in a relatively flood-free area, though apparently more by luck than by planning, and experienced much of its growth after the 1889 Johnstown Flood.
