= Olivia Locher =

American photographer (born 1990)

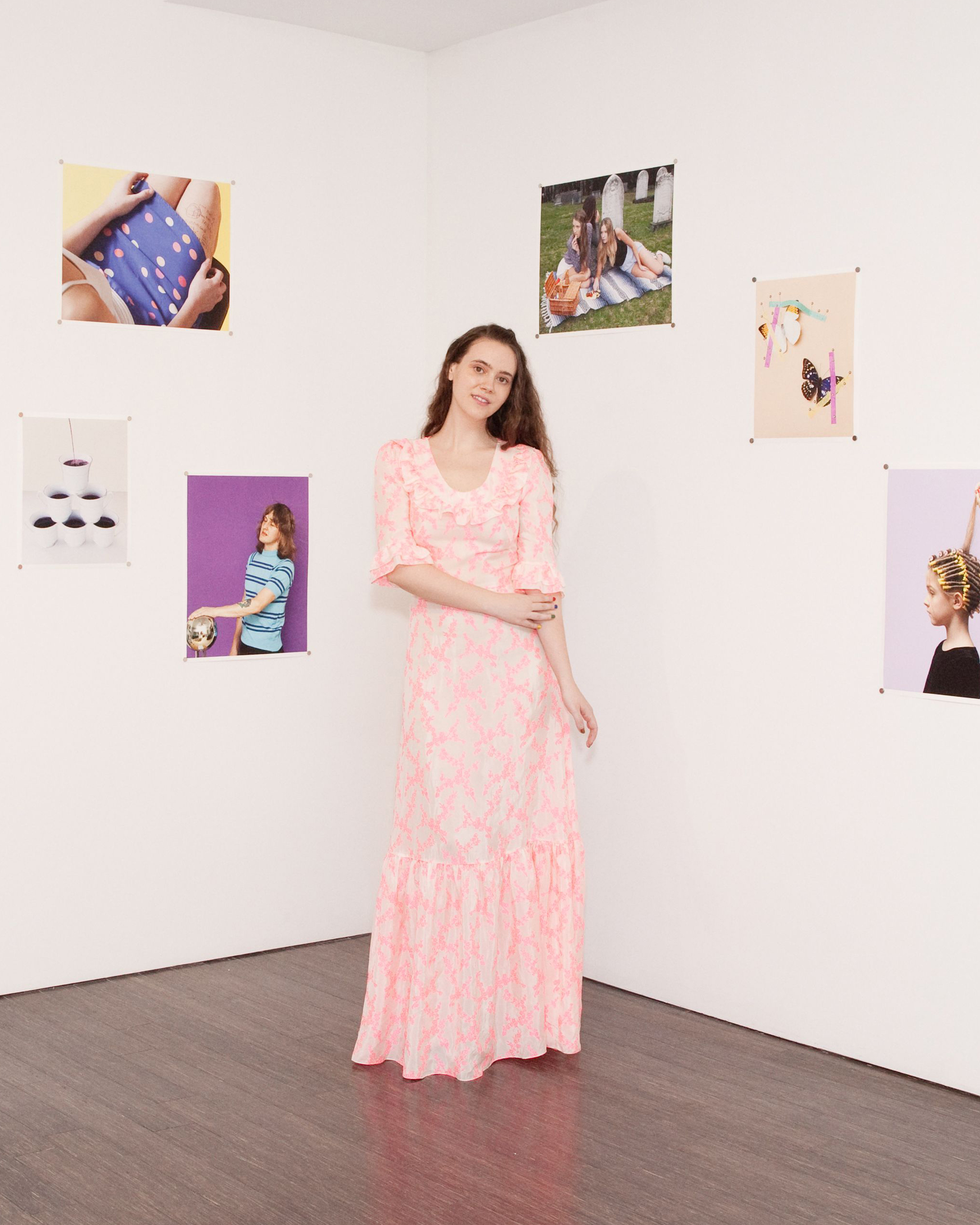
- Locher, September 2017
- Born: December 20, 1990 (age 35); Johnstown, Pennsylvania
- Education: Bachelor of Fine Arts
- Alma mater: The School of Visual Arts
- Occupation: Photographer
- Website: olivialocher.com

Olivia Locher (born in 1990) is an American photographer. She gained notoriety for her photography series breaking an eccentric law from each of the 50 States of the Union, entitled I Fought the Law. A monograph of this project was released by Chronicle Books in September 2017.

== Early life and education ==
Locher was born in Johnstown, Pennsylvania and is the youngest of two children. She enrolled as a photography student at The School of Visual Arts in New York City in 2009 and received her BFA in 2013.

== Work ==
Locher is known for her sarcastic approach to studio photography with a heavy focus on color and concept. Her first monograph is Olivia Locher: I Fought the Law, with a foreword by poet Kenneth Goldsmith and an interview of Locher by Eric Shiner. The images in I Fought the Law were created between June 2013 and June 2016 at Locher's studio in New York City and in her hometown of Johnstown, Pennsylvania.

Locher was a recipient of Forbes 30 Under 30 Art & Style for 2018.

Locher has contributed editorial assignments to The New York Times Magazine, W, Pitchfork, and Vice.
