= Peoples Natural Gas Park =

Park in Johnstown, Pennsylvania, US

- Interactive map of Peoples Natural Gas Park
- Former names: Festival Park
- Address: 90 Johns Street
- Location: Johnstown, Pennsylvania
- Coordinates: 40.3291°N 78.9239°W
- Seating type: Lawn, pavilion fold out seating
- Capacity: 560-600
- Type: Indoor and outdoor concerts, Park

Construction
- Built: 2011
- Cost: $4,000,000+

Website
- http://floodcitymusic.org

Peoples Natural Gas Park is located near the Cambria Iron National Historic Landmark at the junction of the Conemaugh and Stoneycreek Rivers and there is a view of the Stone Bridge and the Johnstown Inclined Plane.
Located on 3.5 acres, the park has an outdoor pavilion that seats 600 as well as the adjacent Oilhouse that seats about 560.
Funded by Peoples Natural Gas for The Johnstown Area Heritage Association.
The newly completed Peoples Natural Gas Park is the home of the AmeriServ Flood City Music Festival and many other special events produced by the Johnstown Area Heritage Association (JAHA) and other organizations. The park includes landscaping, new restrooms, pathways and new sidewalks, ornamental fencing and gates around the perimeter.

The music festival has been staged here with temporary infrastructure since 2004. The festival utilizes the 3.5-acre park, Walnut Street and the parking lots across from the train station. Located across the river from Point Stadium and beside the Cambria Iron National Historic Landmark, the Peoples Natural Gas Park provides a beautiful view of downtown Johnstown, including the Inclined Plane and the Johnstown Flood Museum. The park is bordered by the Johnstown Urban Greenway, and stretches to the Johns Street Bridge.

The historic Stone Bridge, which has been lighted in colorful, programmable LED lights, is located at one end of the park. Every evening the bridge is lighted for three hours, beginning with a 20-minute lightshow before settling into a static scheme chosen to reflect the time of year, holidays, or special events and observances. The bridge will be lighted during festival hours, starting at dusk.

Development of the Park

Since the purchase of the park's land in 2004, the Johnstown Area Heritage Association has been working to develop it as a permanent home for the music festival and as a catalyst for more special events. On May 23, 2011, a naming ceremony was held to name the park for the Peoples Natural Gas Co., which has donated $500,000 toward the project. Construction began in fall 2011 and was completed in May 2012.

The master plan for the park is by L.R. Kimball. The master plan was developed with input from a study committee in 2005–2006, public meetings in 2006, and individual discussions with agencies that have supported the project or might use it. Primary contractors on the project are Wilson Construction Inc., Mervac Plumbing & Heating, Inc., Church & Murdock Electric, Inc. and JWF Industries.

Park Financing

A $2 million matching grant from the Commonwealth of Pennsylvania Redevelopment Assistance Capital Project was awarded to JAHA in spring 2008 for the park's development. In 2011, the Peoples Natural Gas donation completed the match.

Several other major grants made the project possible, including a $100,000 grant from the Katherine Mabis McKenna Foundation. The Johnstown Redevelopment Authority provided matching Environmental Protection Agency Brownfield Cleanup funds. Also, the authority was instrumental in undertaking the environmental assessment of the park and obtaining PA DEP Environmental Clearance. A grant for design costs was obtained from the Community Conservation Program, Growing Greener Fund, administered by the Department of Conservation and Natural Resources, Bureau of Recreation and Conservation. A $100,000 grant from Mark Pasquerilla assisted with initial improvements to the property, which included the removal of underground gas tanks and installation of utility infrastructure.

Other donors to the park include William Polacek; the Southwestern Pennsylvania Heritage Preservation Commission; JAHA's board of directors; and other supporters and friends of JAHA.
