= Johnstown Magazine =

Johnstown Magazine is a monthly magazine describing events and activities in the Johnstown, Pennsylvania and surrounding area. The magazine began in April 2005 and is published by Community Newspaper Holdings based in Birmingham, Alabama.
