= Johnstown, Pennsylvania =

City in Pennsylvania, United States

- City
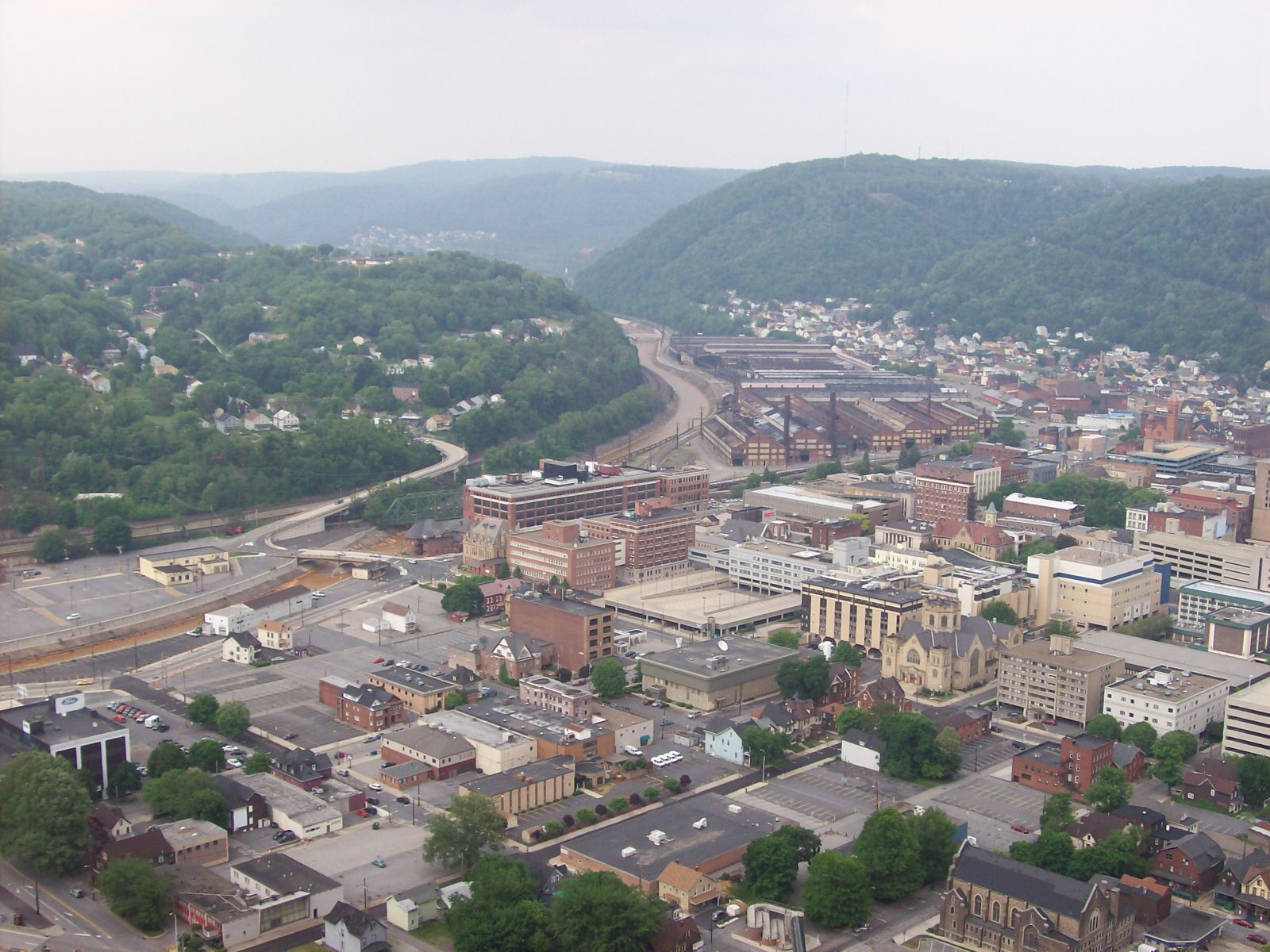
- View of Johnstown from the Inclined Plane

- Flag Seal
- Nickname: Flood City
- Location of Johnstown in Cambria County, Pennsylvania

- Location within Pennsylvania Location within the United States
- Coordinates: 40°19′34″N 78°55′10″W
- Country: United States
- State: Pennsylvania
- County: Cambria
- Founded: 1800
- Incorporated (borough): 1831 (as Conemaugh)
- Incorporated (city): December 18, 1889

Government
  - Type: City Council
  - Mayor: Sylvia King (D)
  - Deputy mayor: Michael Capriotti
  - Council Member: Rev. Sylvia King; Charles Arnone; Laura Huchel; Marie Mock; Richard Britt

Area
  - City: 6.111 sq mi (15.827 km^{2})
  - Land: 5.913 sq mi (15.315 km^{2})
  - Water: 0.198 sq mi (0.514 km^{2})
- Elevation: 1,161 ft (354 m)

Population (2020)
  - City: 18,411
  - Estimate (2023): 17,950
  - Density: 3,040/sq mi (1,172/km^{2})
  - Urban: 61,521 (US: 444th)
  - Metro: 130,668 (US: 313th)
- Time zone: UTC−5 (Eastern (EST))
  - Summer (DST): UTC−4 (EDT)
- ZIP Codes: 15901–15902, 15904–15907, 15909, 15915, 15945
- Area codes: 814 and 582
- FIPS code: 42-38288
- GNIS feature ID: 1215025
- Sales tax: 6.0%
- Website: johnstownpa.gov

Pennsylvania Historical Marker
- Designated: October 1, 1947

Johnstown is a city in Cambria County, Pennsylvania, United States. The population was 18,411 as of the 2020 census. Located 57 miles (92 km) east of Pittsburgh, it is the principal city of the Johnstown metropolitan area, which had 133,472 residents in 2020. It is also part of the Johnstown–Somerset combined statistical area, which includes both Cambria and Somerset counties. Once a bustling industrial center, like many cities in the Rust Belt, Johnstown was severely affected by the loss of jobs in the steel industry due to globalization and the movement of American manufacturing to overseas markets.

== History ==
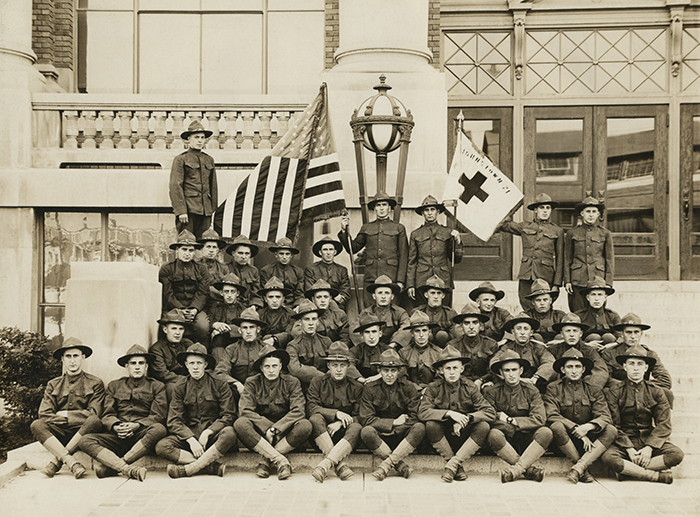
U.S. Army unit in Johnstown before heading to France during World War I

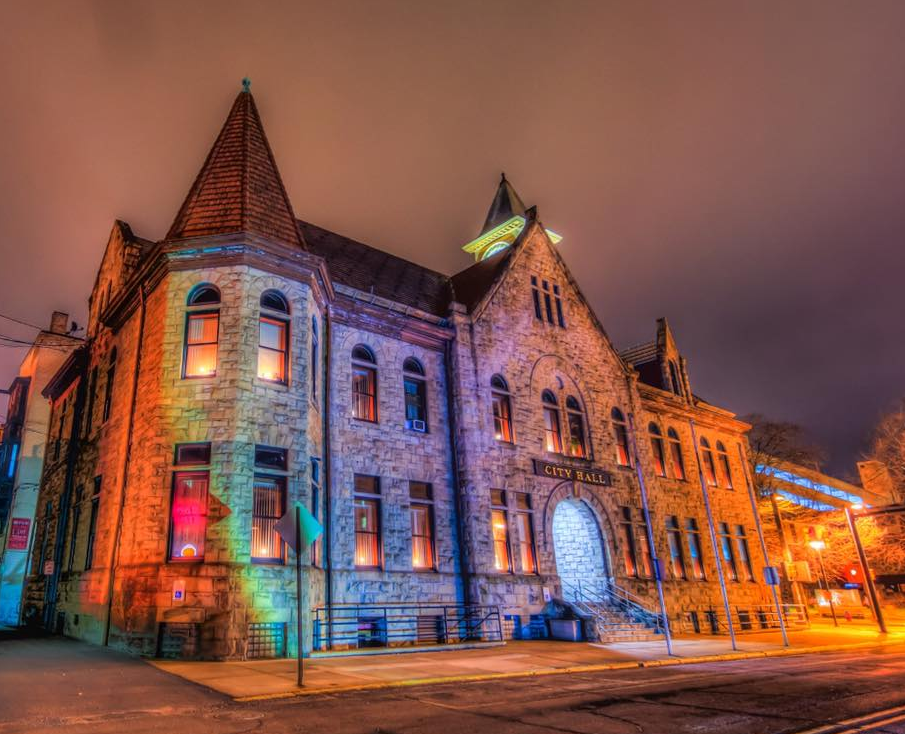
Johnstown City Hall

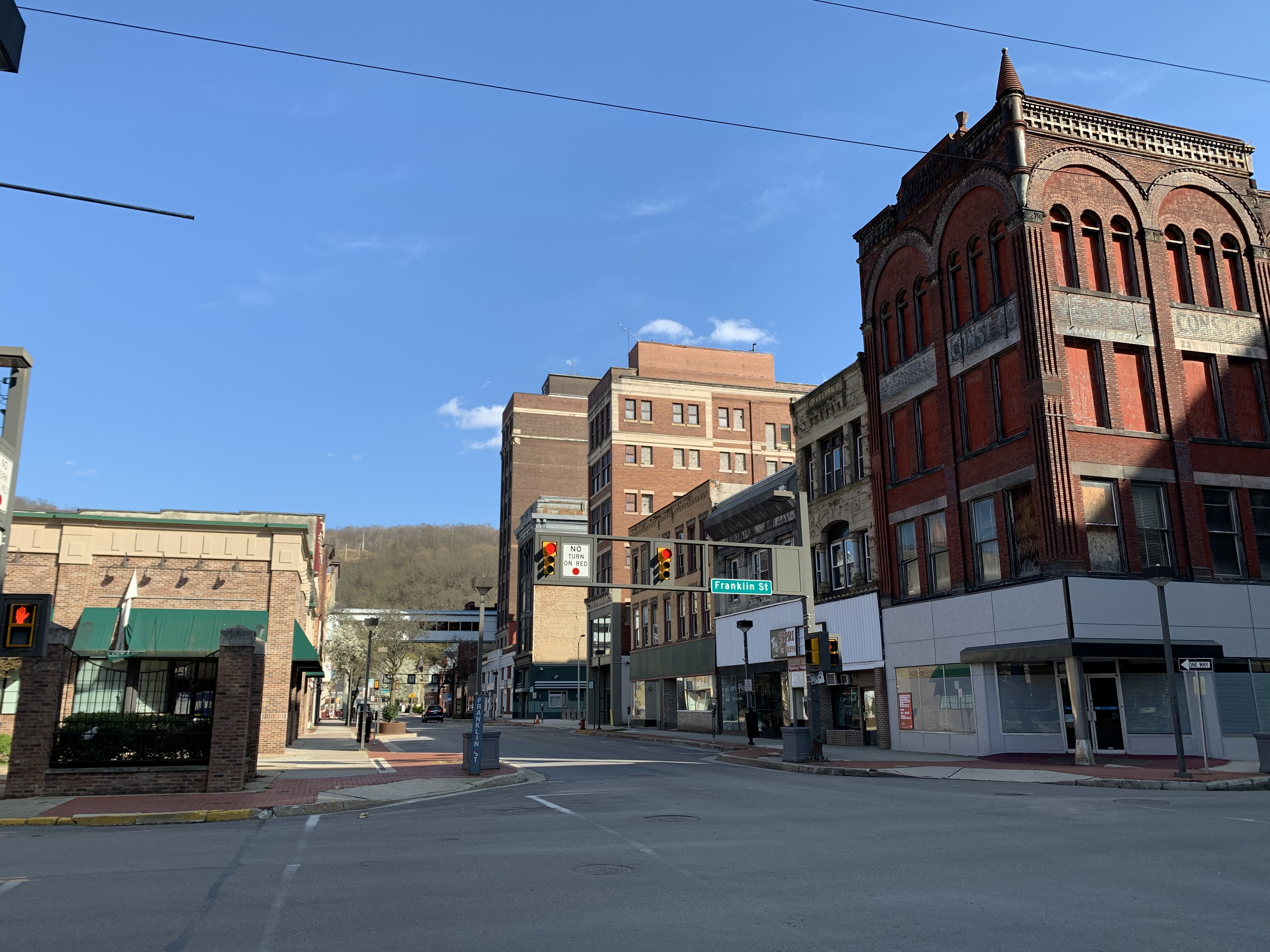
Upper Main Street

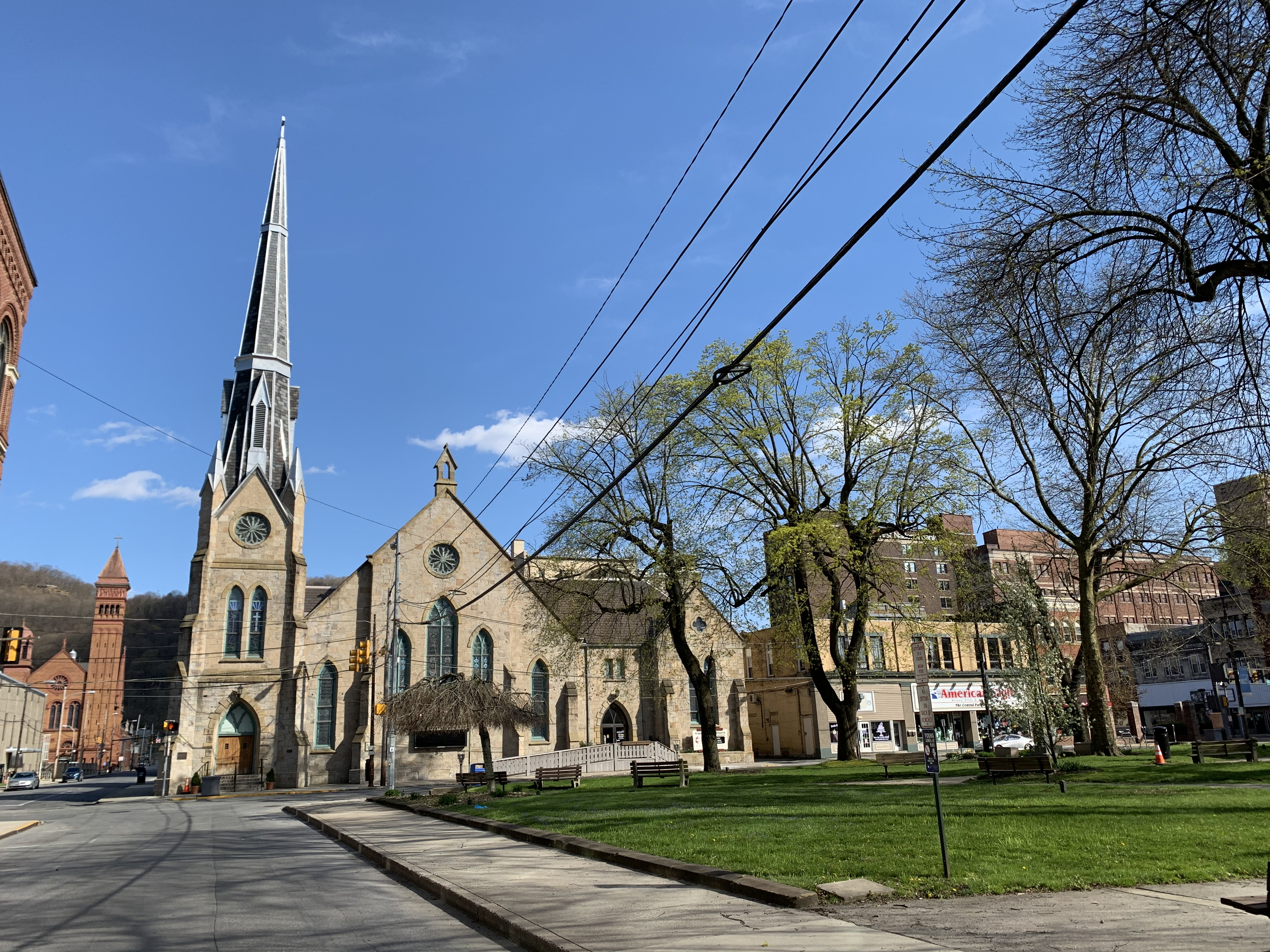
Historic Franklin Street United Methodist Church survived all three major floods.

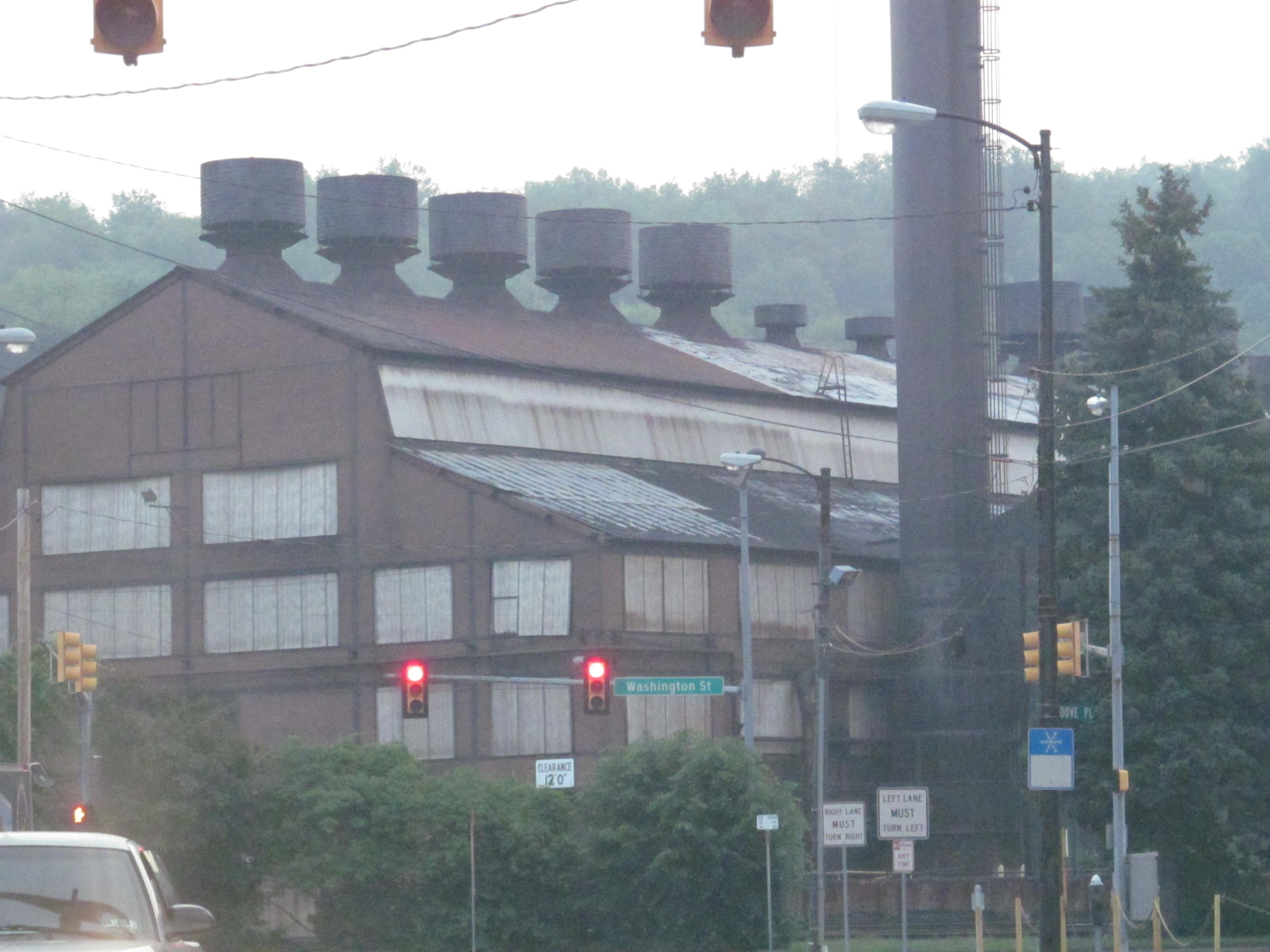
A steel mill plant in Downtown Johnstown

Johnstown was settled by Europeans in 1770. Its population and economy expanded from the post-Civil War period well into the 20th century, as the Industrial Revolution stimulated manufacturing, mining of iron and coal, and the rise of the steel industry. These industrial jobs attracted migrants from the South and new groups of immigrants from Eastern and Southern Europe.

The city has suffered three major floods in its history. The Johnstown Flood of May 31, 1889, occurred after the earthen South Fork Dam collapsed 14.1 miles (22.7 km) upstream from the city during heavy rains. At least 2,209 people died as a result of the flood and subsequent fire that raged through the debris.

Another major flood occurred in 1936. Despite a pledge by President Franklin Delano Roosevelt to make the city flood free, and despite subsequent work to do so, another major flood occurred in 1977.

Before becoming an independent town, Windber was considered a part of the city.

The city is home to five national historic districts: the Downtown Johnstown Historic District, Cambria City Historic District, Minersville Historic District, Moxham Historic District, and Old Conemaugh Borough Historic District. Individual listings on the National Register of Historic Places are the Grand Army of the Republic Hall, Cambria Iron Company, Cambria Public Library Building, Bridge in Johnstown City, Nathan's Department Store, and Johnstown Inclined Railway.

=== 19th century ===
Johnstown was formally platted as Conemaugh Old Town in 1800 by the Swiss German immigrant Joseph Johns (born Josef Schantz). The settlement was initially known as "Schantzstadt", but was soon anglicized to Johnstown. An African-American settlement was established on Laurel Hill northwest of Johnstown by the 1820s, within what is today Laurel Ridge State Park. The Laurel Hill settlement remained an important part of the Johnstown African-American community into the 20th century.

The Johnstown community incorporated as Conemaugh borough January 12, 1831, but was renamed Johnstown on April 14, 1834. From 1834 to 1854, the city was a port and key transfer point along the Pennsylvania Main Line Canal. Johnstown was at the head of the canal's western branch, with canal boats having been transported over the mountains via the Allegheny Portage Railroad and refloated here, to continue the trip by water to Pittsburgh and the Ohio Valley. Perhaps the most famous passenger who traveled via the canal to visit Johnstown briefly was Charles Dickens in 1842.

By 1854, canal transport became redundant with the completion of the Pennsylvania Railroad, which now spanned the state. With the coming of the railroads, the city's growth improved. Johnstown became a stop on the main line of the Pennsylvania Railroad and was connected with the Baltimore & Ohio. The railroads enabled large-scale development of the region's mineral wealth and access to important coastal and internal markets.

Iron, coal, and steel quickly became central to the town of Johnstown. By 1860, the Cambria Iron Company of Johnstown was the leading steel producer in the United States, outproducing steel giants in Pittsburgh and Cleveland. Through the second half of the 19th century, Johnstown made much of the nation's barbed wire. Johnstown prospered from skyrocketing demand in the western United States for barbed wire. Twenty years after its founding, the Cambria Works was a huge enterprise sprawling over 60 acres (24 ha) in Johnstown and employing 7,000. It owned 40,000 acres (160 km^{2}) of valuable mineral lands in a region with a ready supply of iron, coal and limestone.

Floods were almost a yearly event in the valley during the 1880s. On the afternoon of May 30, 1889, following a quiet Memorial Day ceremony and a parade, it began raining in the valley. The next day water filled the streets, and rumors began that a dam holding an artificial lake in the mountains to the northeast might give way. It did, and an estimated 20 million tons of water began pouring into the winding gorge that led to Johnstown some 14 miles (23 km) away, collecting timber, animals and broken up houses along the way.

The widespread destruction of Johnstown occurred in about 10 minutes. What had been a thriving steel town, with homes, churches, saloons, a library, a railroad station, electric street lights, a roller rink, and two opera houses, was buried under mud and debris. Debris piled up around destroyed houses and bridges, with many fires breaking out. Out of a population of approximately 30,000 at the time, at least 2,209 people are known to have perished in the disaster. An infamous site of a major fire during the flood was the old stone Pennsylvania Railroad bridge located where the Stonycreek and Little Conemaugh rivers join to form the Conemaugh River. The bridge still stands today.

As a result of its response to the Johnstown flood of 1889, the American Red Cross became the pre-eminent emergency relief organization in the United States. Founder Clara Barton, then 67, came to Johnstown with 50 doctors and nurses and set up tent hospitals as well as temporary "hotels" for the homeless. She stayed on for five months to coordinate relief efforts. The mills were back in operation within a month. The Cambria Works grew, and Johnstown became more prosperous than ever. The disaster had not destroyed the community but strengthened it. Later generations would draw on lessons learned in 1889. After the successful merger of six surrounding boroughs, Johnstown became a city on April 7, 1890.

=== 20th century ===
In 1923, Johnstown Mayor Joseph Cauffiel ordered the expulsion of all African Americans and Mexicans in Johnstown who had lived in Johnstown for less than seven years. The edict was in response to a deadly shootout between Robert Young, a Black man, and Johnstown police officers. African Americans had settled in the Rosedale neighborhood during the Great Migration, as Southerners moved north to industrial cities to escape violence related to Jim Crow.

Although Cauffiel's edict of expulsion was without legal force, some 500 African Americans fled the city. The Ku Klux Klan had a revival in this period in the region, and members burned 12 crosses outside Johnstown in an attempt to intimidate Rosedale's Black population. Pennsylvania Governor Gifford Pinchot intervened to prevent Cauffiel from enforcing the edict.

In the early 20th century, the population reached 67,000 people. The city's first commercial radio station, WJAC, began broadcasts in 1925. The downtown boasted at least five major department stores, including Glosser Brothers, which in the 1950s gave birth to the Gee Bee chain of department stores.

But the damage from the St Patrick's Day flood of 1936, combined with the gnawing effects of the Great Depression, left Johnstown struggling again. Seeking a permanent solution to the flooding problem, Johnstown's citizens wrote to President Franklin Roosevelt pleading for federal aid. In August 1938, the U. S. Army Corps of Engineers launched a five-year project that gouged, widened, deepened, and moved 9.2 miles (14.8 km) of river channel in the city, and encased the river banks in concrete and reinforced steel. In a campaign organized by the Chamber of Commerce, thousands of Johnstown's citizens wrote to friends and relatives across the country hoping to bring new business to the town.

Professional ice hockey found a home in Johnstown, starting in 1941 with the Johnstown Blue Birds for one season. It returned in 1950 with the Johnstown Jets. The Jets later hosted an exhibition game against Maurice Richard and the Montreal Canadiens on November 20, 1951. Newcomers to the town heard little about the tragic past. Johnstown proclaimed itself "flood-free", a feeling reinforced when Johnstown was virtually the only riverside city in Pennsylvania to avoid flooding as a result of Hurricane Agnes in 1972.

The immediate post-World War II years marked Johnstown's peak as a steel maker and fabricator. At its peak, steel provided Johnstowners with more than 13,000 full-time, well-paying jobs. However, increased domestic and foreign competition, coupled with Johnstown's relative distance from its primary iron ore source in the western Great Lakes, led to a steady decline in profitability. New capital investment waned. Johnstown's mountainous terrain, and the resulting poor layout for the mills' physical plant strung along 11 miles (18 km) of river bottom lands, compounded the problem.

New regulations ordered by the EPA in the 1970s to correct environmental problems also affected Johnstown. The aging Cambria plant (now Bethlehem Steel) needed expensive upgrades. However, with encouragement from the steel company, city leaders organized an association called Johnstown Area Regional Industries (JARI) and, within a year, raised $3 million for industrial development in the area. Bethlehem Steel, which was the major contributor to the fund, committed itself to bringing new steelmaking technologies to Johnstown because they were impressed by the city's own efforts to diversify its economy.

A 1977 flood caused extensive damage in the city. There were rumors that Bethlehem Steel might leave altogether. Again, the city won a reprieve from the company's top management, which had always regarded the Johnstown works with special affection because of its history and reputation.

Federal environmental regulations established more protections for workers and locales, increasing costs. The issues with the aging manufacturing facilities grew more significant. As steel companies began closing down plants all over the country, by 1982 it looked as if Johnstown had exhausted its appeals.

By the early 1990s, most steel production was ended in Johnstown. Some limited fabrication work continues.

=== 21st century ===
In 2003, U.S. Census data showed that Johnstown was the least likely city in the United States to attract newcomers. But since then local manufacturing and service economies have more recently begun to burgeon, attracting outsiders. Gamesa Corporación Tecnológica, a Spanish wind energy company, opened its first U.S. wind turbine blade manufacturing facility near here in 2006. It closed in 2014. Several wind turbines are sited on Babcock Ridge, the "Eastern Continental Divide", along the eastern edge of Cambria and Somerset counties. Lockheed Martin relocated a facility from Greenville, South Carolina, to Johnstown in 2008. Höganäs AB, a Swedish powdered metals manufacturer, operates two plants in the region, one in the Moxham section of the city and also in nearby Hollsopple in Somerset County. Companies such as Concurrent Technologies Corporation, DRS Laurel Technologies, ITSI Biosciences, Kongsberg Defense and more throughout the region are thriving businesses.

Recent construction in the surrounding region, the downtown, and adjacent Kernville neighborhood—including a new 100,000-square-foot (9,300 m^{2}) Regional Technology Complex that will house a division of Northrop Grumman, among other tenants—signal the increasing dependence of Johnstown's economy on the U.S. government's defense budget. The high-tech defense industry is now the main non-health-care staple of the Johnstown economy, with the region pulling in well over $100M annually in federal government contracts, punctuated by one of the premier defense trade shows in the U.S., the annual Showcase for Commerce.

Johnstown remains a regional medical, educational, cultural, and communications center. As in many other locales, health care has provided a significant percentage of the employment opportunities in the city. The region is located in the middle of the "Health Belt", an area stretching from the Midwest to New England and down the East Coast where massive growth has taken place in the health care industry. Major health care centers include Memorial Medical Center and Windber Medical Center, the Laurel Highlands Neuro-Rehabilitation Center, and the John P. Murtha Neuroscience and Pain Institute, with its advances in treating wounded veterans, and the Joyce Murtha Breast Care Center's focus on early diagnosis and advanced treatment.

The University of Pittsburgh at Johnstown and Pennsylvania Highlands Community College attract thousands of students to their contiguous campuses in Richland, 5 miles (8 km) east of Johnstown. Cambria-Rowe Business College, located in the Moxham section of Johnstown, which offered concentrated career training and had continuously served Johnstown since 1891, closed in 2016 after loss of accreditation.

The Pasquerilla Performing Arts Center, a concert/theatrical venue at the University of Pittsburgh at Johnstown, attracts high-quality performers. The Johnstown Symphony Orchestra and the recently formed Johnstown Symphony Chamber Players provide classical music. The Johnstown Concert Ballet, centered in the Historic Cambria City District, provides classical ballet performances and training to the area. The Pasquerilla Convention Center was recently constructed downtown, adjacent to the historic Cambria County War Memorial Arena at 326 Napoleon Street. Point Stadium, a baseball park where Babe Ruth once played, was razed and rebuilt.

A zoning ordinance created an artist zone and a traditional neighborhood zone to encourage both artistic endeavors and the old-fashioned "Mom and Pop" enterprises that had difficulty thriving under the previous code. The Bottleworks Ethnic Arts Center offers many exhibitions, events, performances, and classes that celebrate the rich and diverse cultural heritage of the area.

The Johnstown Chiefs ice hockey team played for 22 seasons, the longest period a franchise of the league stayed in one city. The Chiefs were a member team of the ECHL, and played their home games in the Cambria County War Memorial Arena. The Chiefs' decision to relocate caused a flood of public interest in the sport of hockey. As many as four leagues were interested in having a team in the War Memorial. In the end the city landed a deal with another ECHL team, the Wheeling Nailers, who played parts of two seasons at the War Memorial. A full-time tenant arrived in 2012, when the Johnstown Tomahawks of the junior North American Hockey League began play.

The Frank & Sylvia Pasquerilla Heritage Discovery Center opened in 2001 with the permanent exhibit "America: Through Immigrant Eyes". It tells the story of immigration to the area during the Industrial Revolution, from the mid-19th century into the early 20th century.

In June 2009, the Heritage Discovery Center opened the Johnstown Children's Museum and premiered "The Mystery of Steel", a film detailing the history of steel in the region. The Bottleworks Ethnic Arts Center, ART WORKS, and the Heritage Discovery Center are all located in the historic Cambria City section of town, which also boasts a variety of eastern European ethnic churches and social halls. This neighborhood hosted the National Folk Festival for three years in the early 1990s, which expanded into the Flood City Music Festival. For 25 years, Johnstown hosted the Thunder in the Valley motorcycle rally during the fourth week of June; the event attracted motorcyclists from across the Northeast to the city of Johnstown from 1998 until the annual event ended in 2023. Well over 200,000 participants enjoyed the 2008 edition of Thunder in the Valley.

The city and county have made significant efforts to deal with deteriorating housing, brownfields, drug problems, and other issues. Numerous people who can afford to move have left the city limits in recent decades and settled in newer housing in suburban boroughs and townships.

In September 2025, construction started on rebuilding Johnstown's Central Park, adding a new gazebo, fountain, walkways, and different landscaping. The project ended up costing around 7 million dollars, and was reopened on September 19th 2026 almost exactly a year later.

== Geography ==
Johnstown is located in southwestern Cambria County at 40°19′34″N 78°55′10″W (40.3260031, -78.9193066).

According to the United States Census Bureau, the city has a total area of 6.111 square miles (15.83 km^{2}), of which 5.913 square miles (15.31 km^{2}) is land and 0.198 square miles (0.51 km^{2}) is water. The Conemaugh River forms at Johnstown at the confluence of its tributaries, the Stonycreek River and the Little Conemaugh.

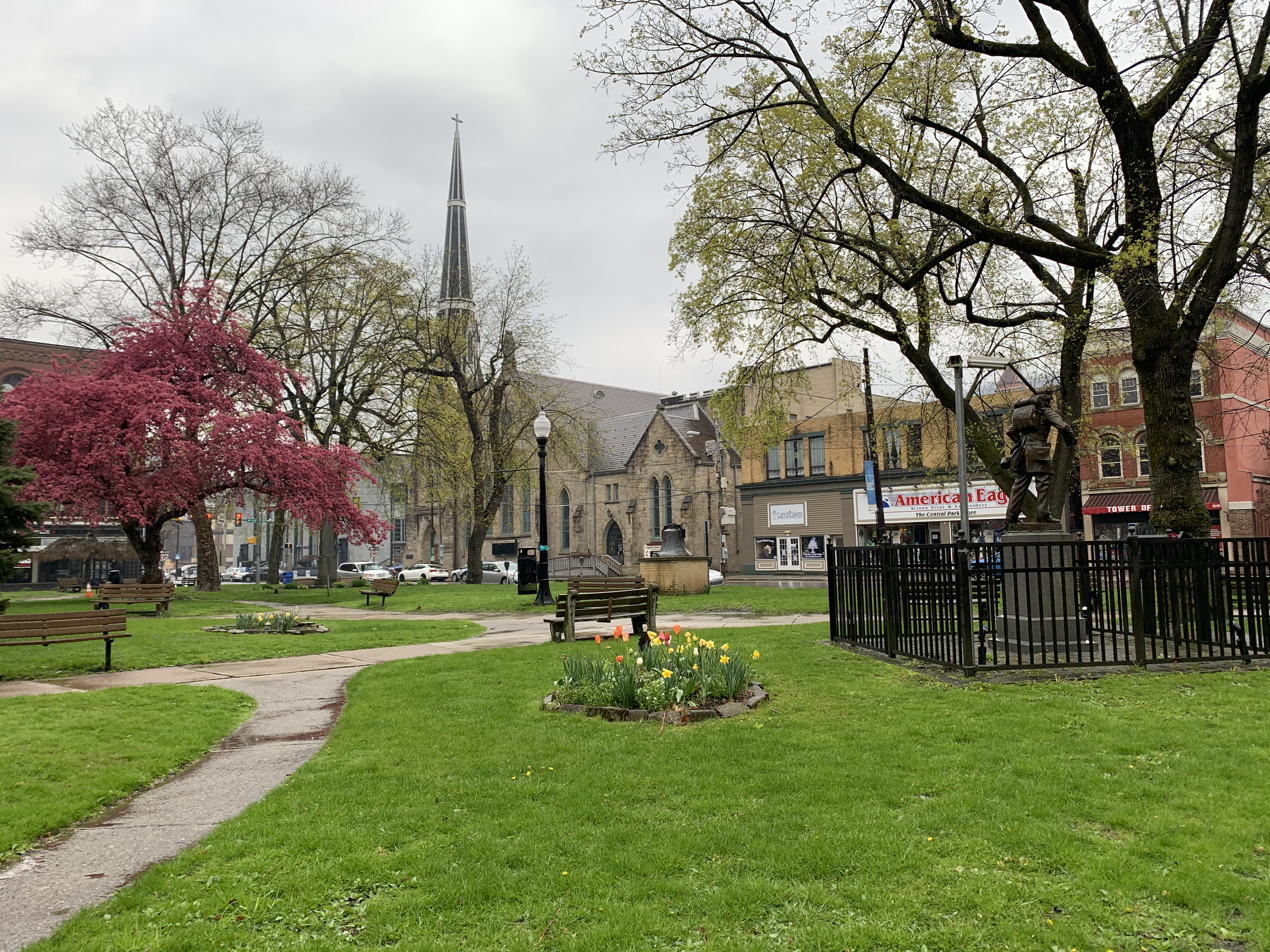
Johnstown's Central Park

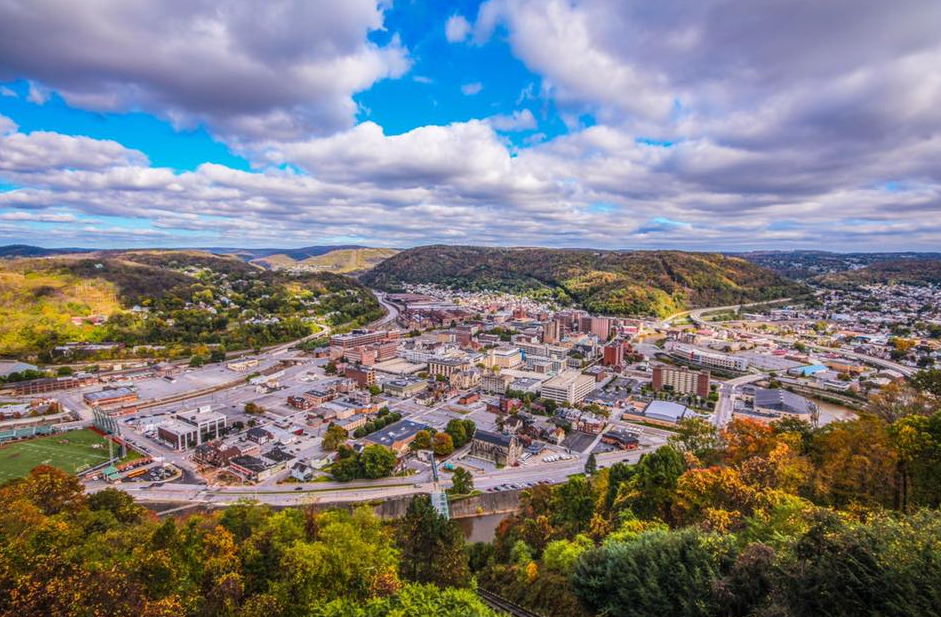
View of the city of Johnstown from atop the Inclined Plane

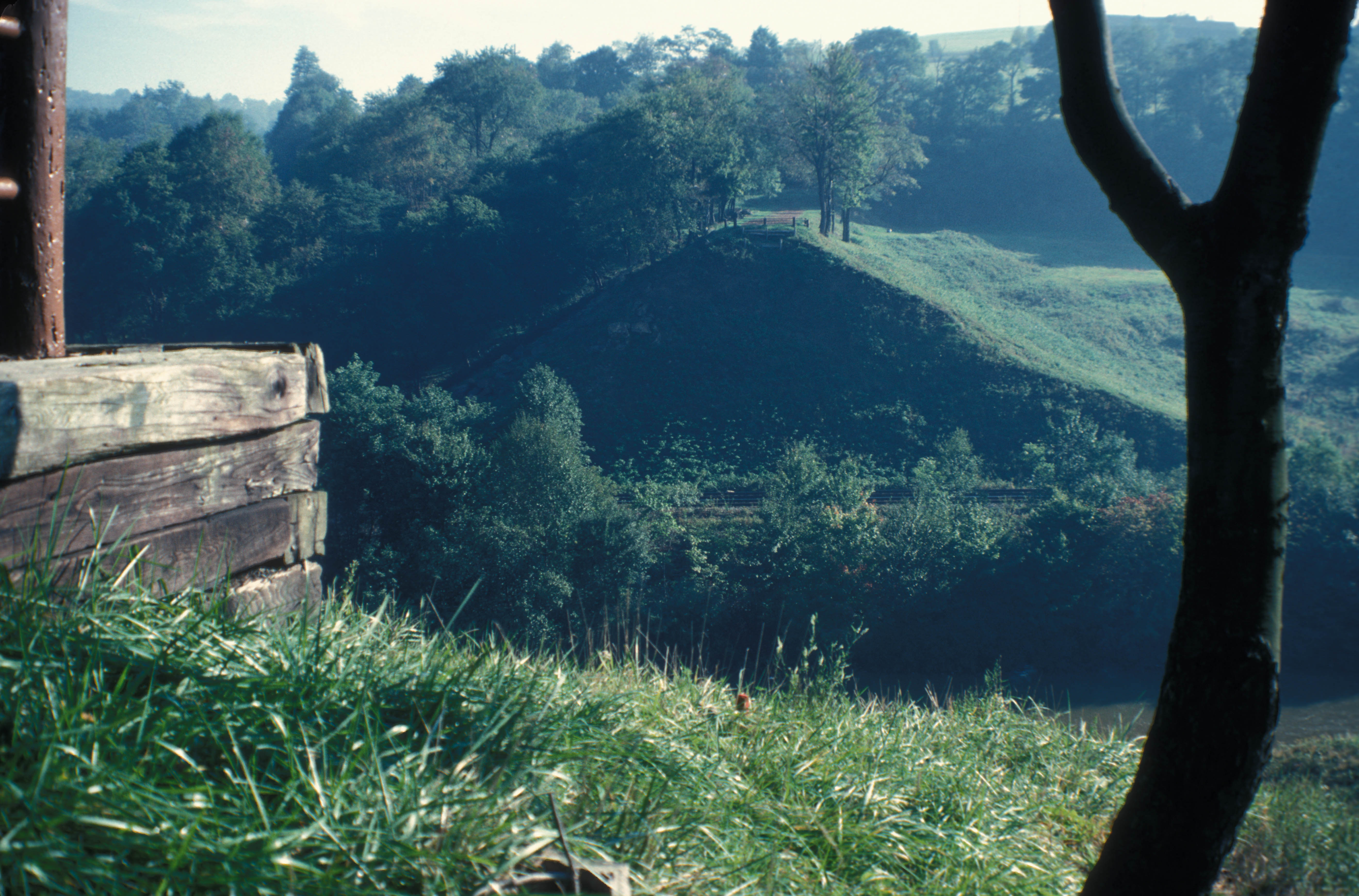
Johnstown Flood Memorial & Walking Trail

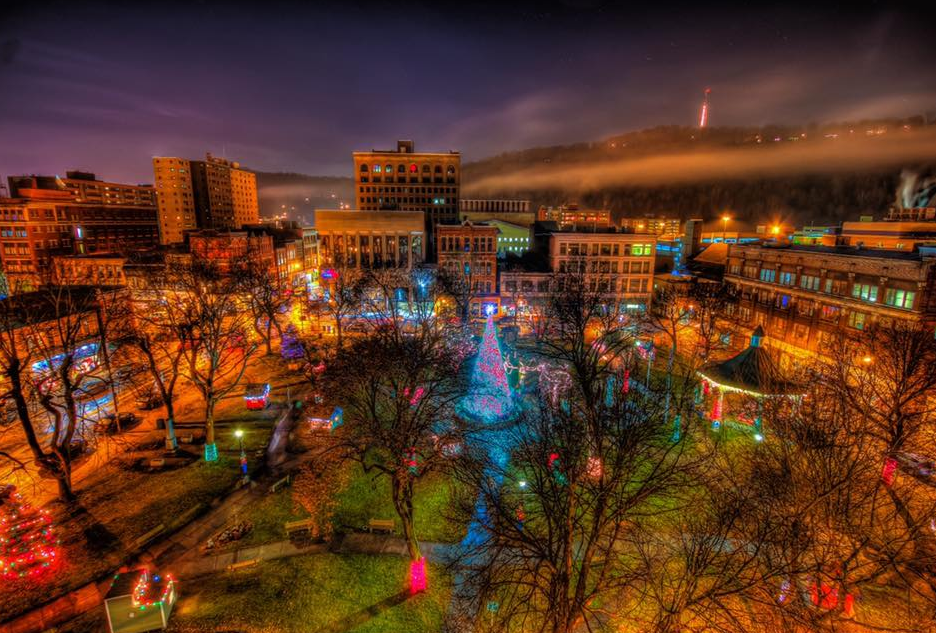
Downtown Johnstown during the holiday season
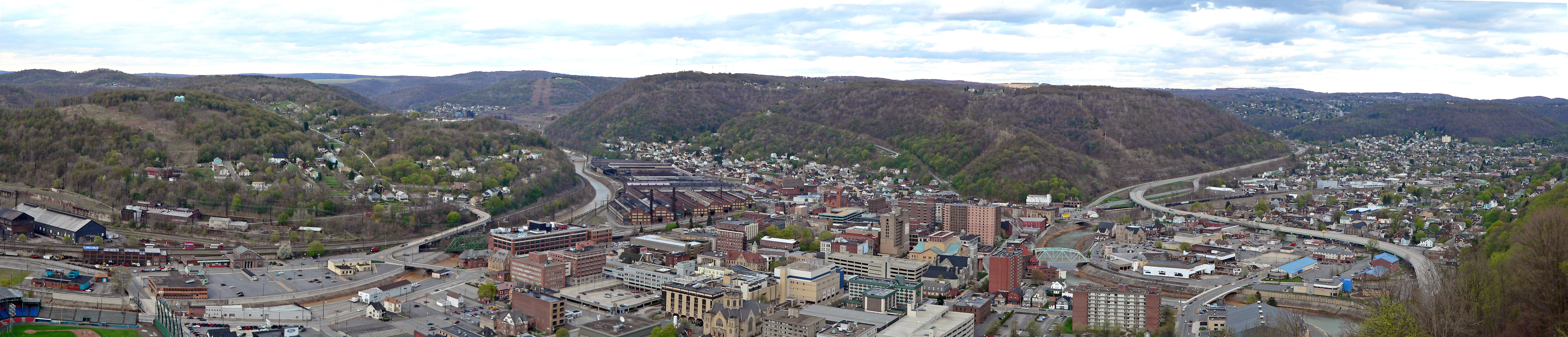
Panoramic view of Johnstown

=== Neighborhoods ===
Johnstown is divided into many neighborhoods, including the Downtown Business District, Kernville, Hornerstown, Roxbury, Old Conemaugh Borough, Prospect, Woodvale, Minersville, Cambria City, Morrellville (West End), Oakhurst, Coopersdale, Walnut Grove, Moxham and the 8th Ward. Before 1900, the town of Windber, was a neighborhood of Johnstown, until its incorporation.

==== Suburbs ====
- West Hills: Westmont, Southmont, Brownstown, Ferndale, Upper Yoder Township, and Lower Yoder Township
- East Hills: Richland Township, Geistown, Windber, Lorain and Stonycreek Township.

The borough of Dale is an enclave surrounded by the city of Johnstown, situated on the southeast side of the city between Hornerstown and Walnut Grove.

- North: East Conemaugh, Franklin, Daisytown, as well as West Taylor, Middle Taylor, and East Taylor townships.
- Other areas surrounding the city include Ferndale, Seward, Jackson Township, South Fork, Salix, Beaverdale, Sidman, St. Michael, Dunlo, Wilmore, Elton and Summerhill.

=== Climate ===
Johnstown has a humid continental climate (Dfa in downtown/Dfb at the airport, which is much higher in elevation than most of the city proper.) The hardiness zones are 6a and 6b.

Climate data for Johnstown, Pennsylvania (Cambria County Airport) (1991-2020 normals, extremes 2000-present)
| Month | Jan | Feb | Mar | Apr | May | Jun | Jul | Aug | Sep | Oct | Nov | Dec | Year |
|---|---|---|---|---|---|---|---|---|---|---|---|---|---|
| Record high °F (°C) | 65 (18) | 73 (23) | 76 (24) | 83 (28) | 87 (31) | 90 (32) | 94 (34) | 90 (32) | 88 (31) | 84 (29) | 76 (24) | 71 (22) | 94 (34) |
| Mean maximum °F (°C) | 56.7 (13.7) | 56.6 (13.7) | 66.5 (19.2) | 77.8 (25.4) | 82.6 (28.1) | 85.0 (29.4) | 86.4 (30.2) | 85.2 (29.6) | 83.2 (28.4) | 76.1 (24.5) | 68.0 (20.0) | 58.5 (14.7) | 87.7 (30.9) |
| Mean daily maximum °F (°C) | 33.4 (0.8) | 36.3 (2.4) | 44.7 (7.1) | 57.9 (14.4) | 68.2 (20.1) | 74.9 (23.8) | 78.6 (25.9) | 77.1 (25.1) | 70.5 (21.4) | 59.4 (15.2) | 47.4 (8.6) | 37.8 (3.2) | 57.2 (14.0) |
| Daily mean °F (°C) | 26.3 (−3.2) | 28.7 (−1.8) | 36.4 (2.4) | 48.1 (8.9) | 58.5 (14.7) | 66.0 (18.9) | 69.9 (21.1) | 68.6 (20.3) | 61.6 (16.4) | 51.1 (10.6) | 40.1 (4.5) | 31.2 (−0.4) | 48.9 (9.4) |
| Mean daily minimum °F (°C) | 19.2 (−7.1) | 21.2 (−6.0) | 28.0 (−2.2) | 38.4 (3.6) | 48.8 (9.3) | 57.2 (14.0) | 61.2 (16.2) | 60.0 (15.6) | 52.7 (11.5) | 42.7 (5.9) | 32.8 (0.4) | 24.6 (−4.1) | 40.6 (4.8) |
| Mean minimum °F (°C) | 0.1 (−17.7) | 2.3 (−16.5) | 9.2 (−12.7) | 23.2 (−4.9) | 33.4 (0.8) | 43.4 (6.3) | 50.6 (10.3) | 49.9 (9.9) | 40.3 (4.6) | 29.0 (−1.7) | 17.1 (−8.3) | 7.3 (−13.7) | −2.4 (−19.1) |
| Record low °F (°C) | −14 (−26) | −11 (−24) | −2 (−19) | 14 (−10) | 23 (−5) | 38 (3) | 42 (6) | 45 (7) | 32 (0) | 26 (−3) | 6 (−14) | −8 (−22) | −14 (−26) |
| Average precipitation inches (mm) | 2.54 (65) | 2.53 (64) | 3.12 (79) | 3.54 (90) | 4.12 (105) | 4.40 (112) | 4.22 (107) | 3.95 (100) | 3.99 (101) | 3.06 (78) | 3.11 (79) | 2.68 (68) | 41.26 (1,048) |
| Average precipitation days (≥ 0.01 in) | 15.2 | 14.0 | 13.8 | 14.1 | 16.7 | 14.6 | 14.6 | 13.5 | 12.2 | 14.5 | 12.7 | 14.6 | 170.5 |
Source: NOAA

== Demographics ==
Historical population
| Census | Pop. | Note | %± |
|---|---|---|---|
| 1840 | 949 | | — |
| 1850 | 1,269 | | 33.7% |
| 1860 | 4,185 | | 229.8% |
| 1870 | 6,028 | | 44.0% |
| 1880 | 8,380 | | 39.0% |
| 1890 | 21,805 | | 160.2% |
| 1900 | 35,936 | | 64.8% |
| 1910 | 55,482 | | 54.4% |
| 1920 | 67,327 | | 21.3% |
| 1930 | 66,993 | | −0.5% |
| 1940 | 66,668 | | −0.5% |
| 1950 | 63,232 | | −5.2% |
| 1960 | 53,949 | | −14.7% |
| 1970 | 42,476 | | −21.3% |
| 1980 | 35,496 | | −16.4% |
| 1990 | 28,134 | | −20.7% |
| 2000 | 23,906 | | −15.0% |
| 2010 | 20,978 | | −12.2% |
| 2020 | 18,411 | | −12.2% |
| 2023 (est.) | 17,950 | | −2.5% |
U.S. Decennial Census; 2020 Census

=== 2020 census ===
As of the 2020 census, there were 18,411 people, 8,574 households, and 4,399 families residing in the city. The population density was 3,104.7 inhabitants per square mile (1,198.7/km^{2}). There were 11,133 housing units, of which 23.0% were vacant; the homeowner vacancy rate was 4.0% and the rental vacancy rate was 13.5%.

The median age was 41.0 years. 23.9% of residents were under the age of 18 and 19.2% of residents were 65 years of age or older. For every 100 females there were 90.6 males, and for every 100 females age 18 and over there were 86.6 males age 18 and over.

99.9% of residents lived in urban areas, while 0.1% lived in rural areas.

Of those households, 25.3% had children under the age of 18 living in them. Of all households, 23.7% were married-couple households, 26.4% were households with a male householder and no spouse or partner present, and 41.7% were households with a female householder and no spouse or partner present. About 42.8% of all households were made up of individuals and 18.4% had someone living alone who was 65 years of age or older.

Racial composition as of the 2020 census
| Race | Number | Percent |
|---|---|---|
| White | 12,547 | 68.1% |
| Black or African American | 3,854 | 20.9% |
| American Indian and Alaska Native | 41 | 0.2% |
| Asian | 81 | 0.4% |
| Native Hawaiian and Other Pacific Islander | 9 | 0.0% |
| Some other race | 225 | 1.2% |
| Two or more races | 1,654 | 9.0% |
| Hispanic or Latino (of any race) | 773 | 4.2% |

=== 2010 census ===
As of the 2010 census, there were 20,978 people, 9,917 households, and 5,086 families residing in the city. The population density was 3,559.8 inhabitants per square mile (1,374.4/km^{2}). There were 11,978 housing units at an average density of 2,030.2 per square mile (783.9/km^{2}). The racial makeup of the city was 80.0% White, 14.6% African American, 0.2% Native American, 0.2% Asian, 0.02% Pacific Islander, 0.7% some other race, and 4.3% from two or more races. Hispanics or Latinos of any race were 3.1% of the population. In the three-year period ending in 2010, it was estimated that 22.3% of the population were of German, 15.8% Irish, 12.9% Italian, 7.7% Slovak, 6.7% English, 5.6% Polish, and 6.1% American ancestry.

At the 2010 census, there were 9,917 households, of which 22.0% had children under the age of 18 living with them, 28.5% were headed by married couples living together, 17.1% had a female householder with no husband present, and 48.7% were non-families. Of all households, 43.0% were made up of individuals, and 17.9% were someone living alone who was 65 years of age or older. The average household size was 2.08 and the average family size was 2.87.

The age distribution was 21.7% under 18, 8.4% from 18 to 24, 24.4% from 25 to 44, 27.9% from 45 to 64, and 18.5% who were 65 or older. The median age was 41.8 years. For every 100 females, there were 87.9 males. For every 100 females age 18 and over, there were 84.5 males.

For the period 2011–2013, the estimated median annual income for a household in the city was $23,785, and the median income for a family was $32,221. Male full-time workers had a median income of $31,026 versus $28,858 for females. The per capita income for the city was $15,511. 34.2% of the population and 26.9% of families were below the poverty line. Of the total population, 55.0% of those under the age of 18 and 18.4% of those 65 and older were living below the poverty line.

The unemployment average is reported at 9%. Most of the jobs center around health care, defense, telemarketing and retail.

== Economy ==
A reduction in steel production also reduced coal mining in Pennsylvania, which was important to the Johnstown economy. In 1982, Johnstown's longest-serving mayor, Herbert Pfuhl Jr., said that, as a result of the decline, city revenues had fallen approximately 35 percent. In recent years, Johnstown has focused on diversifying its economy beyond steel, with growth in healthcare, education, and small business development.

The Johnstown economy later recovered somewhat, largely due to industry around health care and high-tech defense. But in 2017 it was reported to be the third-fastest shrinking city in the U.S. In 2018, Johnstown was ranked 169th among "The Best Small Places For Business And Careers" in the U.S., by Forbes.

Major employers in the area include:

- American Red Cross
- AmeriServ Financial
- Arthur J. Gallagher & Co.
- Atlantic Broadband
- Concurrent Technologies Corporation
- Conemaugh Health System
- Concentrix
- Crown American
- DRS Technologies
- Galliker's
- Höganäs AB
- Kongsberg Gruppen
- Lockheed Martin
- Marmon Group—Penn Machine
- Martin-Baker
- Metropolitan Life
- Northrop Grumman
- Pepsi
- Zamias Services, Inc.

== Arts and culture ==
=== Landmarks ===
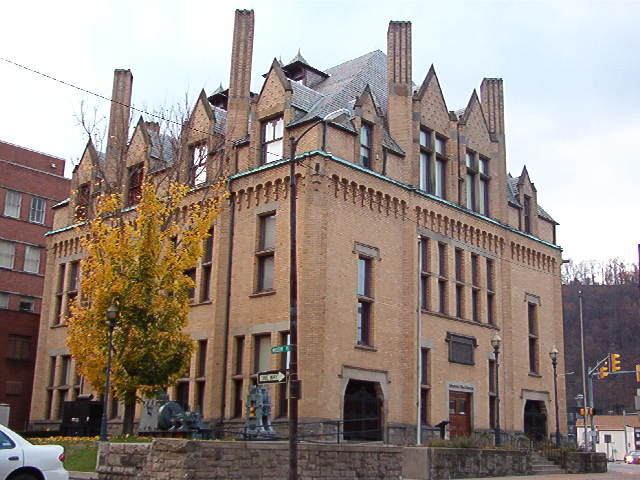
The Carnegie Library, now the Johnstown Flood Museum

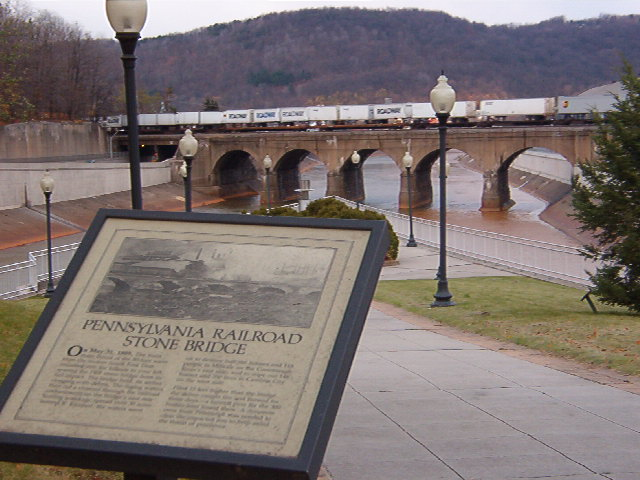
The Stone Bridge stands today as it did in the 1800s

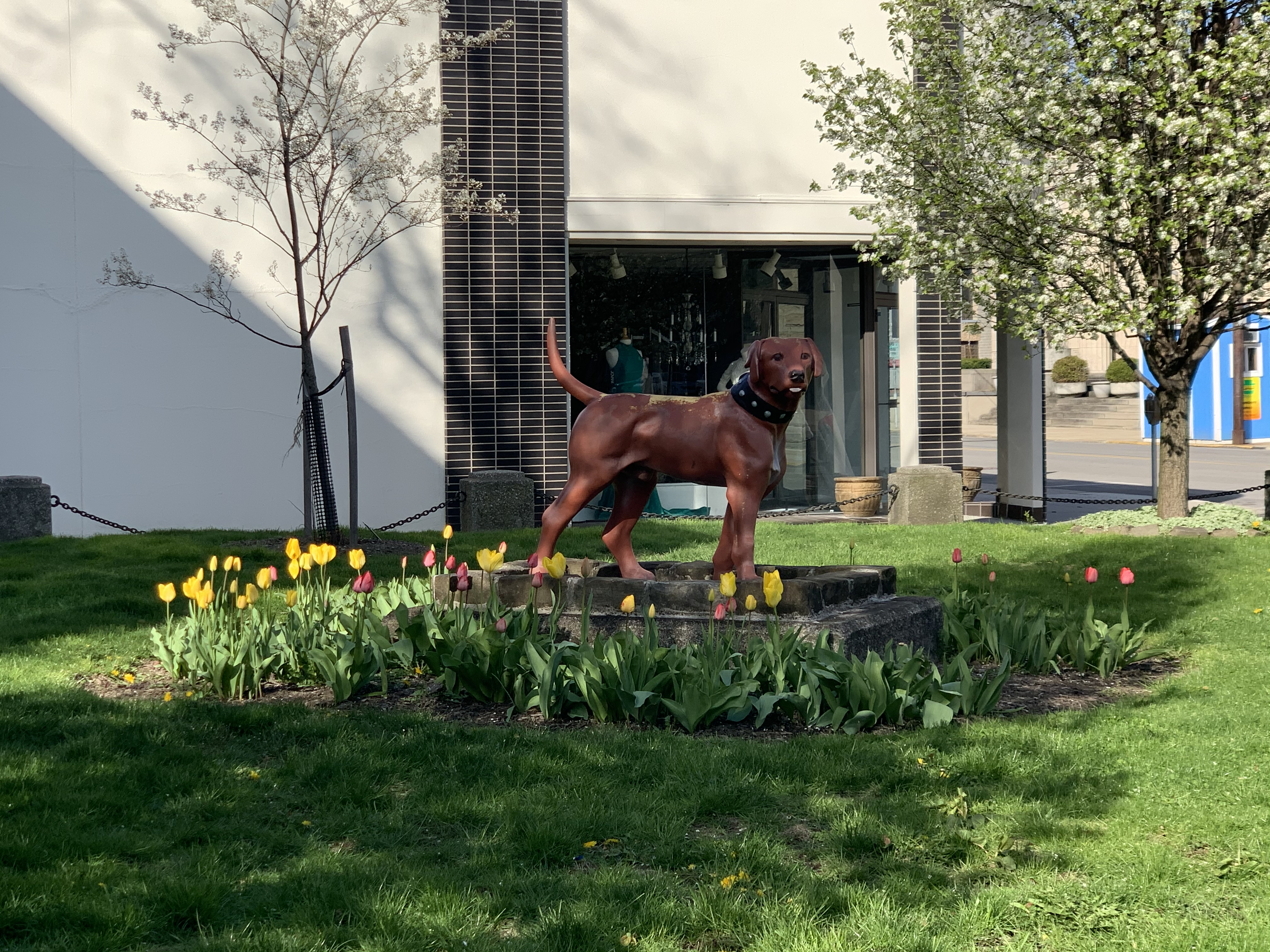
Morley's Dog, a sculpture that survived the 1889 flood

- Cambria County War Memorial Arena
- Cambria Iron Company is a National Historic Landmark located near the downtown area. Johnstown's city seal has an image of this facility.
- Famous Coney Island Hot Dogs – Founded in 1916, this eatery is synonymous with Johnstown culture.
- Frank J. Pasquerilla Conference Center
- Frank & Sylvia Pasquerilla Heritage Discovery Center – includes several attractions: "America: Through Immigrant Eyes," a permanent exhibit about immigration to the area around the turn of the 20th century; the Johnstown Children's Museum, a 7,000-square-foot (650 m^{2}) children's museum; and the Iron & Steel Gallery, a three-story gallery that includes "The Mystery of Steel," a film about the history of steel in Johnstown.
- Grandview Cemetery, Johnstown is one of Pennsylvania's largest cemeteries: With more than 65,000 interments, Grandview is home to over 47 burial sections and more than 235 acres (0.95 km^{2}) of land. Grandview also holds the remains of the 777 victims of the 1889 Johnstown Flood who were not able to be identified.
- Johnstown Flood National Memorial – the National Park Service site that preserves the remains of the South Fork Dam and portions of the Lake Conemaugh bed.
- Johnstown Flood Museum – shows the Academy Award-winning film The Johnstown Flood as part of the museum experience.
- Johnstown Inclined Plane is the world's steepest vehicular inclined plane.
- Pasquerilla Plaza (the Crown American Building)
- Peoples Natural Gas Park
- Point Stadium
- Silver Drive-In – first opened in 1962. While other such facilities in the area have closed over the course of years, the Silver survived through public outcry over proposals to close and demolish it, making a comeback in 2005. Located in Richland Township, it is now the only drive-in theater in the Johnstown region.
- Staple Bend Tunnel is the first railroad tunnel constructed in the United States, and a National Historic Landmark.
- The Stone Bridge is a historic railroad bridge over the Conemaugh River.

=== Events ===
Johnstown hosts a number of events each year. "Thunder in the Valley" was a motorcycle rally with weekend crowds ranging from 150,000 to 200,000. Thunder in the Valley held its last event in 2023, but the inaugural "Rumble Through the Valley" will host its first rally in June 2025.

The AAABA amateur baseball tournament is held at the Point Stadium in downtown Johnstown.

The Flood City Music Festival is held at Peoples Natural Gas Park, which has hosted national acts ranging from Boz Scaggs, Gregg Allman (of the Allman Brothers), Spin Doctors, and Jerry Harrison and Adrian Belew (formerly of Talking Heads).

The Sunnehanna Amateur golf tournament is held once a year at Sunnehanna Country Club. Professional golfers have played in this tournament as amateurs such as Tiger Woods and Arnold Palmer.

== Sports ==
| Club | League | Venue | Established | Championships |
|---|---|---|---|---|
| Johnstown Mill Rats | Prospect League (baseball) | Point Stadium | 2021 | 0 |
| Johnstown Tomahawks | NAHL (ice hockey) | Cambria County War Memorial Arena | 2012 | 0 |

Johnstown has been home to a long succession of minor league hockey franchises dating back to 1940. The most recent, the Johnstown Chiefs, were named for their Slap Shot counterparts. The team made their debut in January 1988 with the All-American Hockey League, joining the league midway through the season. After one season in the AAHL, the Chiefs became one of five teams to join the newly founded East Coast Hockey League (now ECHL). The team announced in February 2010 that they would be leaving Johnstown for a location in South Carolina. In April 2010 it was announced that the Wheeling Nailers of the ECHL would call Johnstown home for 10 games during the regular season and for one of their preseason games. They returned once again for the 2011–12 season. After the 2011-2012 NAHL hockey season, the Alaska Avalanche relocated to Johnstown and became the Johnstown Tomahawks.

The city has history in amateur and professional baseball. Since 1944, Johnstown has been the host city for the AAABA Baseball Tournament held each summer. Several Major League Baseball players have played on AAABA teams over the years, including Hall-of Famers Al Kaline and Reggie Jackson and former Major League managers Joe Torre and Bruce Bochy. The organization also has its own Hall of Fame instituted in its 50th anniversary year of 1994.

In addition, the city has hosted several incarnations of a minor-league baseball team, the Johnstown Johnnies, beginning in 1884. The last team to play as the Johnnies, as a part of the Frontier League, left the city in 2002. The Johnstown Mill Rats, a member of the summer collegiate Prospect League, have played at the Point Stadium since 2021.

Johnstown also hosts the annual Sunnehanna Amateur golf tournament at its Sunnehanna Country Club. The invitational tournament hosts top amateur golfers from around the United States.

Johnstown is home to the Flood City Water Polo team. Established in 2005 by Zachary Puhala, the team takes its name from the history of floods in the area. FCWP is part of the American Water Polo Organization.

=== 2015 Kraft Hockeyville USA contest ===
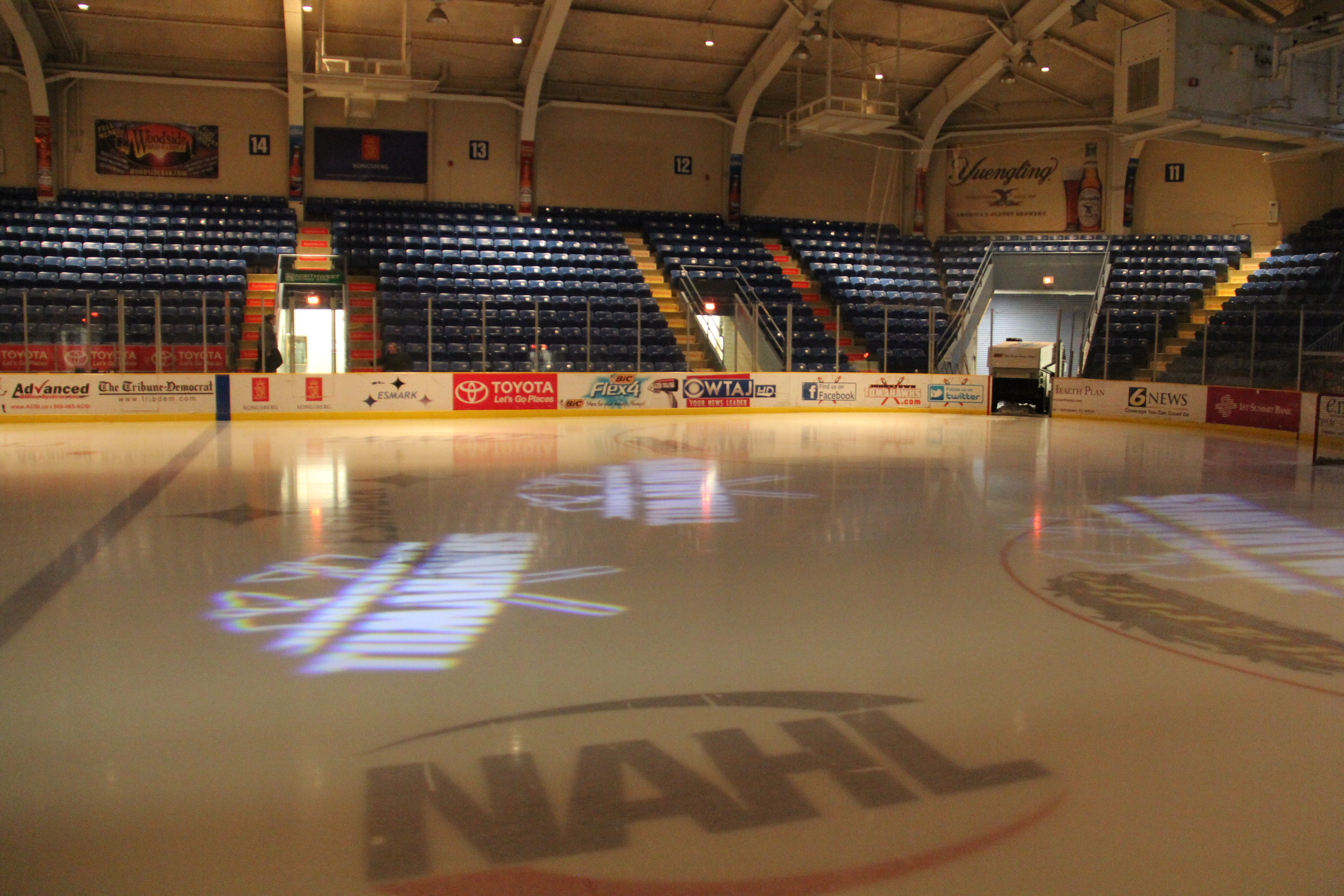
Johnstown was named Kraft Hockeyville USA in 2015.

On May 2, 2015, Johnstown was announced as the winner of the 2015 Kraft Hockeyville USA contest and was awarded $150,000 toward improvements of the Cambria County War Memorial Arena. The contest was sponsored through a partnership between Kraft Foods, the National Hockey League (NHL), and National Hockey League Players' Association (NHLPA). In addition to the cash prize, the arena won the opportunity to host the September 29, 2015, NHL pre-season game between the Pittsburgh Penguins and Tampa Bay Lightning. The Penguins defeated the Lightning 4-2 with goals from Sergei Plotnikov, Ian Cole, Adam Clendening, and a game winning goal from Evgeni Malkin.

== Crime ==
Per WJAC; in the year 2022, Johnstown has had 12 homicides as of August. Statistics have not been updated since 2018 — The chances of becoming a victim of a violent crime in Johnstown are 1 in 184; whereas, the average for Pennsylvania is 1 in 316.”

== Government ==
The Johnstown City Hall is located at 401 Main Street. The mayor of Johnstown is Frank Janakovic, and the Deputy Mayor is Marie Mock.

== Education ==
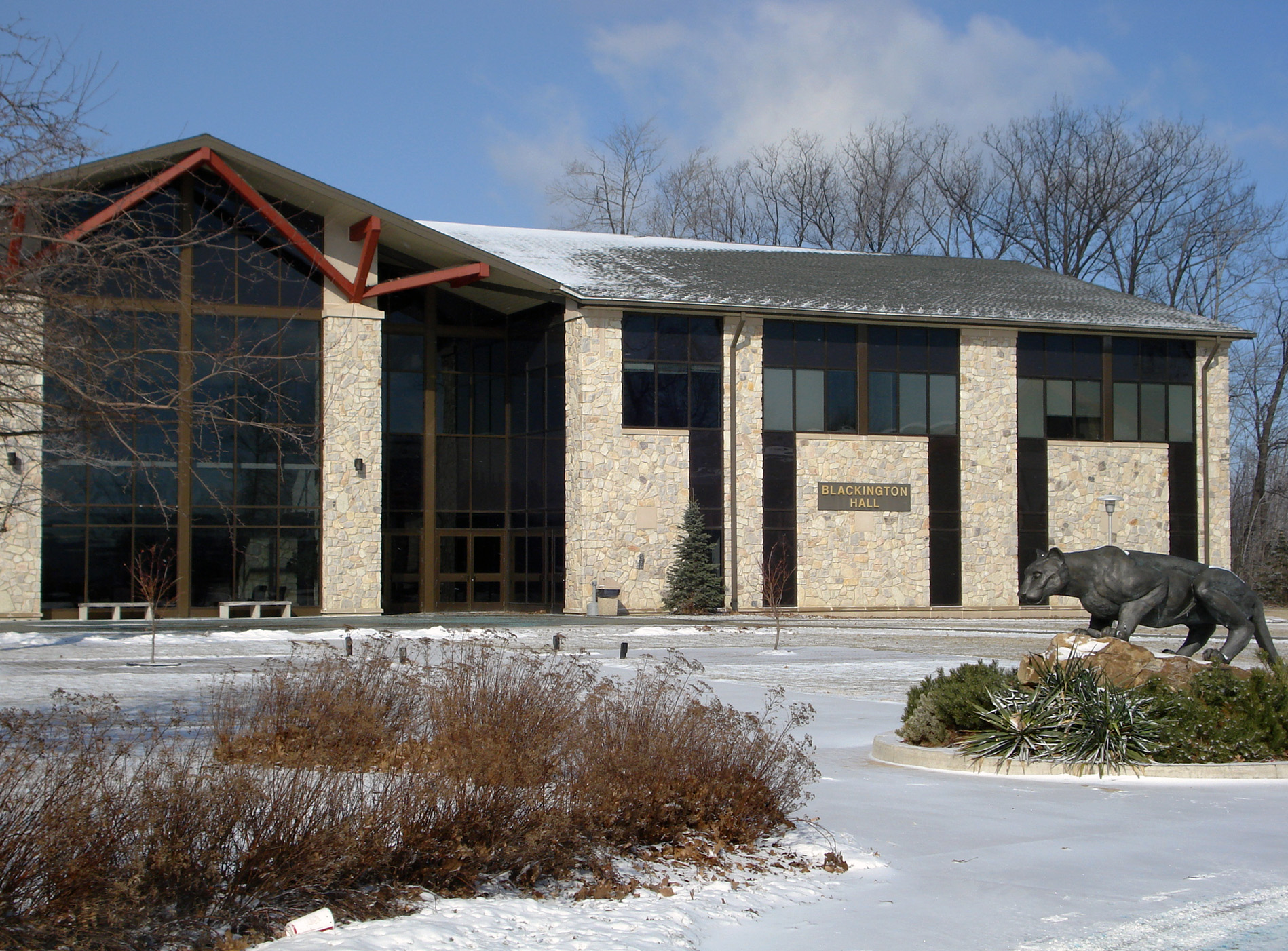
Campus of University of Pittsburgh at Johnstown

Colleges:

- University of Pittsburgh at Johnstown, located just outside the city limits in Richland Township
- Pennsylvania Highlands Community College
- Christ the Saviour Seminary

Secondary education:

- The Greater Johnstown School District serves residents of Johnstown, West Taylor Township, Lower Yoder Township, and Stonycreek Township.
- The district currently operates a pre-school, an elementary school, a middle school, a high school, and a cyber school.
- Bishop McCort High School is a private, Catholic high school serving students in grades 7 through 12.
- The Richland High School District serves the borough of Geistown, and the Richland Township.

Technology schools:

- The Greater Johnstown Career and Technology School, located just outside of the city limits in Richland Township

Libraries:

- The Cambria County Library is located at 248 Main Street.

== Media ==
Johnstown's television market is part of the Johnstown/Altoona/State College market. NBC affiliate WJAC-TV 6 (which also operates the market's CW affiliate through The CW Plus on its DT4 subchannel) and Fox affiliate WWCP-TV 8 are licensed in the city. Johnstown is also served by CBS affiliate WTAJ-TV 10 and ABC affiliate WATM-TV 23, both based in Altoona, and State College-based PBS member station WPSU-TV 3, licensed to Clearfield but based on the Pennsylvania State University campus. Several other low-power stations, including WHVL-LD 29 (MyNetworkTV) in State College, also transmit to Johnstown. WPKD-TV 19, the CW's affiliate in Pittsburgh licensed to Jeannette, began operations in Johnstown and later moved to serve the Pittsburgh area, but would continue to be available in Johnstown until September 2019 as the market's default CW affiliate.

The city is home to three print publications, The Tribune-Democrat, Johnstown Magazine, and Our Town Johnstown.

The Johnstown broadcast market radio stations in the area include WNTJ, WKGE, WJHT, and others.

== Infrastructure ==
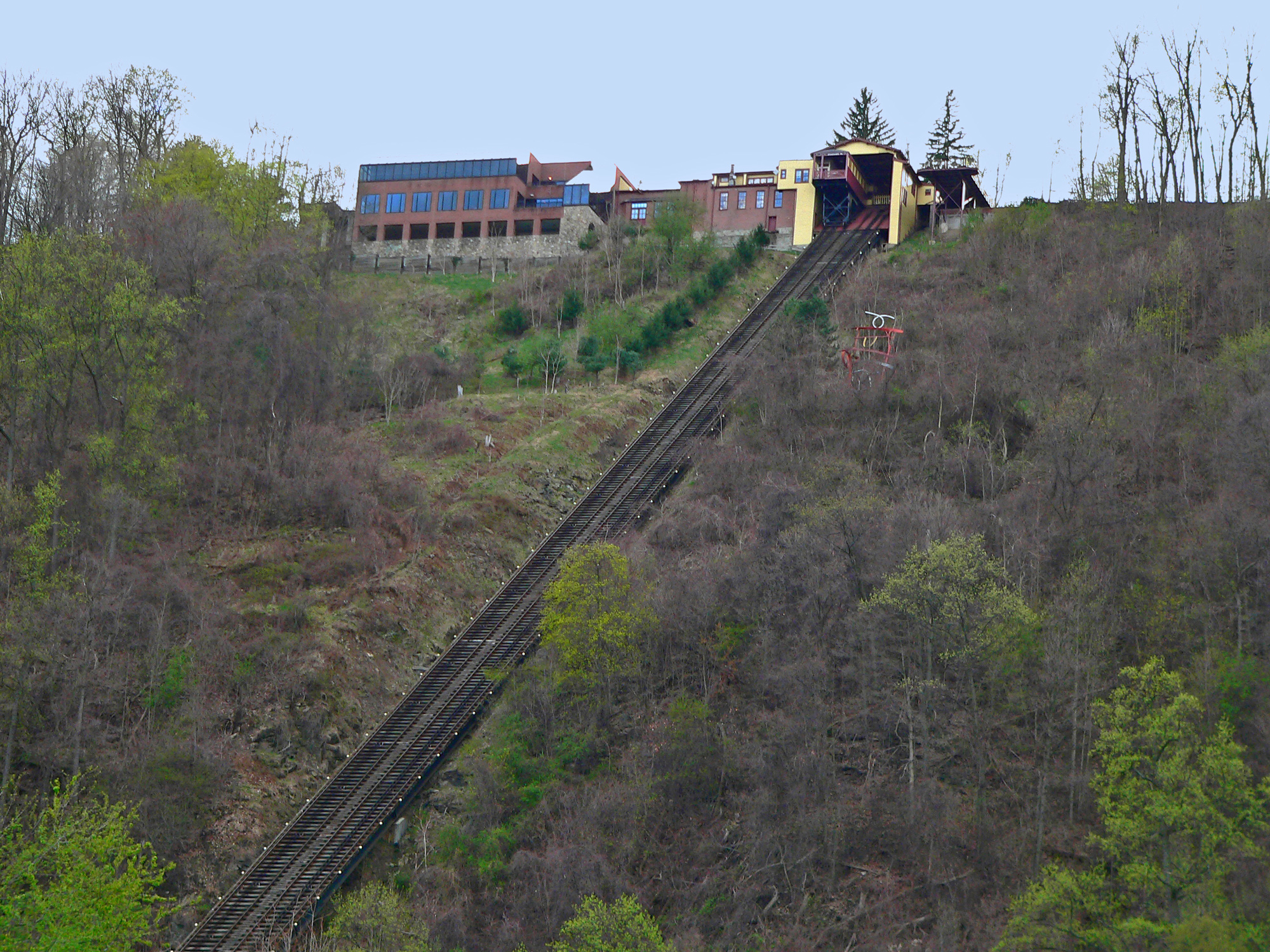
Johnstown Inclined Plane

=== Transportation ===
The main highway connecting Johnstown to the Pennsylvania Turnpike is US 219. There is also PA 56, which is an expressway from US 219 until Walnut Street. From there, it provides a connection to US 22 to the north of Johnstown, which connects to Pittsburgh and Altoona.

The local airport is the John Murtha Johnstown-Cambria County Airport, served by United Express, with flights to Washington-Dulles and Chicago-O'Hare.

Passenger rail service is provided by Amtrak's daily Pennsylvanian at the Johnstown Amtrak station. The city is located on the former mainline of the Pennsylvania Railroad. Norfolk Southern operates 60–80 trains daily on these rails. CSX also has a branch into the city.

CamTran operates the local bus service and the Johnstown Inclined Plane (funicular). Until 1976, local transit service was operated by a private company, Johnstown Traction Company. Streetcars (or "trolleys") operated in Johnstown until 1960, and trolley buses from 1951 until 1967.

=== Emergency services ===
The Johnstown Fire Department has available response teams for Hazardous Materials (HAZMAT) and a boat in which they are able to perform water and ice rescues. Along with the fire department is part of the Special Emergency Response Team (SERT). The fire department also provides on-site classes on fire safety.

The Johnstown Police Department (JPD) has 35 full-time officers and the chief of police is Richard Pritchard.

== Notable people ==
- Alex Azar, former U.S. Secretary of Health and Human Services
- Carroll Baker, Oscar-nominated actress whose Hollywood movie career spanned five decades
- Donald Barlett, journalist and two-time winner of the Pulitzer Prize
- Frank Benford (1887–1948), physicist
- Robert Bernat (1931–1994), brass band conductor
- Mel Bosser (1914–1986), professional baseball player
- Edward R. Bradley (1859–1946), racehorse breeder, owner of four Kentucky Derby winners
- Tom Bradley, football coach, defensive coordinator for UCLA, Penn State
- Charles Wakefield Cadman (1881–1946), composer
- Charles E. Capehart (1833–1911), awarded the Medal of Honor
- Henry Capehart (1825–1895), Civil War general and awarded the Medal of Honor
- Robert E. Casey (1909–1982), Pennsylvania State Treasurer from 1977 to 1981
- D. C. Cooper, heavy metal singer
- Joey Covington (1945–2013), drummer (Jefferson Airplane, Jefferson Starship, Hot Tuna)
- Roger Craig, Jeopardy! contestant
- Harry Griffith Cramer Jr. (1926–1957), Special Forces captain, first US Army soldier killed in Vietnam
- Pat Cummings (1956–2012), professional basketball player, '79 through the late '80s
- Steve Ditko (1927–2018), comic book artist and co-creator of Spider-Man
- Charlene Dukes, academic administrator
- Pete Duranko (1943–2011), Notre Dame and Denver Broncos football player
- Jim Gallagher, Jr., PGA Tour golfer
- Chris Gleason, (1943-2023) racing driver
- Craig Grebeck, professional baseball player
- Jay Greenberg, journalist
- Count Grog, professional wrestling manager/promoter
- Jack Ham, Pro Football Hall of Fame linebacker
- Carlton Haselrig (1966–2020), Pro Bowl offensive guard with Pittsburgh Steelers, only six-time NCAA Wrestling Champion, Distinguished Member of National Wrestling Hall of Fame
- Artrell Hawkins, professional football player, starting strong safety for the NFL's New England Patriots, Carolina Panthers, and Cincinnati Bengals
- Andrew Hawkins, professional football player, wide receiver for the NFL's Cleveland Browns and star of Spike TV's 4th and Long
- Galen Head (1947–2020), professional ice hockey player and Johnstown hockey contributor
- Victor Heiser (1873–1972), Great Flood of 1889 survivor, physician, and author
- Tamar Simon Hoffs, film director, writer, and producer
- Matthew C. Horner (1901–1972), Mariner Corps Major general
- Incantation, death metal band formed in Fair Lawn, New Jersey relocated to Johnstown in the mid-1990s
- E. Snapper Ingram (1884–1966), Los Angeles City Council member, 1927–1933
- Robert T. Jeschonek, award-winning author
- Tim Kazurinsky, comedian and actor, of television's Saturday Night Live and the Police Academy movies
- Natalia Livingston, General Hospital actress
- Olivia Locher, photographer
- Randy Mazey, baseball coach at West Virginia University
- Terry McGovern (1880–1918), Hall of Fame boxer
- Susan Meier, romance novelist
- Charles T. Menoher (1862–1930), World War I general
- John Murtha (1932–2010), U.S. congressman
- George Musulin (1914–1987), American army officer of the Office of Strategic Services (OSS) and CIA operative.
- David Noon, composer
- Michael Novak (1933–2017), author, philosopher, Catholic theologian, US diplomat, a George Frederick Jewett Scholar at the American Enterprise Institute; 1994 recipient of Templeton Prize
- Joe O'Donnell (1922–2007), documentarian, photojournalist and a photographer for the US Information Agency
- Edwarda O'Bara (1953-2012), woman who spent 42 years in a coma
- Joe Pass (1929–1994), jazz guitarist
- Steve Petro (1914–1994), professional football player
- Herb Pfuhl (1928–2011), longest-serving mayor of Johnstown
- Walter Prozialeck, scientist
- Frank Raab (1879–1940), ariel flying ring and artistic gymnast
- Jeff Richardson, professional football player
- Braxton Roxby, professional baseball player
- Ray Scott (1920–1998), sportscaster, inductee in National Sportscasters and Sportswriters Association Hall of Fame
- Russell Shorto, author of Island at the Center of the World, Descartes' Bones: A Skeletal History of the Conflict Between Faith and Reason, and Smalltime: A Story of My Family and the Mob.
- Edward A. Silk (1916–1955), Medal of Honor winner
- Geroy Simon, professional football player, slotback for the CFL's Saskatchewan Roughriders; recipient of the CFL's Most Outstanding Player Award (2006); CFL's all-time leading wide receiver in receiving yards
- Mark Singel, former Lieutenant Governor of Pennsylvania; acting governor from June 14, 1993, to December 13, 1993
- Emil Sitka (1914–1998), actor, whose famous line "Hold hands, you lovebirds!" earned him the moniker as the fourth of the Three Stooges
- Frank Solich, head football coach at Ohio University; 1998–2003 head coach of Nebraska
- LaRod Stephens-Howling, professional football player, running back for the NFL's Pittsburgh Steelers
- John Stofa, quarterback for NFL's Buffalo Bills, Miami Dolphins, and Cincinnati Bengals
- Michael Strank (1919–1945), World War II hero and one of the six U.S. Marines pictured in the famous Iwo Jima flag raising photo, from Johnstown suburb of Franklin
- BIG Brian Subich, world-ranked competitive eater, competed in the Nathan's Hot Dog eating contest
- John J. Tominac (1922–1998), Medal of Honor recipient
- Eem Triplin, rapper
- Richard Verma, US Assistant Secretary of State for Legislative Affairs and US Ambassador to India (2014 nominee)
- Pete Vuckovich, Cy Young Award–winning pitcher
- John Walker, organist
- Benjamin Wallace (1847–1921), American circus owner
- Michael Walzer, philosopher and political scientist, born in New York but raised in Johnstown
- Ian Williams, guitarist and instrumentalist from rock bands Don Caballero (1992–2000) and Battles
- Nan Wynn (1915–1971), singer and actress

== In popular culture ==
The 2021 book Smalltime: The Story of My Family and the Mob, by Russell Shorto, is the story of organized crime in and around Johnstown, and the connections Shorto's family had to the American Mafia.

"The River" by Bruce Springsteen and the E Street Band references "the Johnstown Company."
