= Herb Pfuhl =

American politician

Herbert Pfuhl Jr. (April 25, 1928 – August 18, 2011) was an American politician and teacher. Pfuhl was the longest serving Mayor of Johnstown, Pennsylvania in the municipality's history, serving six terms as head of the city from 1971 to 1977 and again from 1982 to his retirement in 1993.

Pfuhl faced major challenges during his two-decade long career as the elected chief of Johnstown, including population decline, the 1977 Johnstown flood and the collapse of the steel industry, which included one of the city's biggest employers, Bethlehem Steel. However, Pfuhl has been credited with having revitalized downtown Johnstown's business district and successfully lobbying for millions in aid from the U.S. federal government for economic development.

== Biography ==
=== Early life ===
Pfuhl was born in Johnstown, Pennsylvania, in 1928 to German immigrant parents who had moved to the United States during the 1920s. Pfuhl's father, Herbert L. Pfuhl, moved to Johnstown from Berlin, Germany. His mother, Anna Schweitzer, moved to Johnstown from a rural region of Germany when she was 16 years old. She worked as a maid for a Johnstown family, the Suppes. Anna Schweitzer was also a relative of Albert Schweitzer, a prominent physician and theologian. Both became students at Johnstown High School, where they learned English. The couple met while both were attending the Zion Lutheran Church and soon married.

Pfuhl remained a resident of Johnstown for his entire life, eventually settling in the Roxbury neighborhood of the city. He grew up in a home with coal stoves heating the room. Pfuhl enlisted in the United States Navy during World War II. He graduated from Johnstown High School in 1946. He then earned a bachelor's degree from the University of Pittsburgh. Pfuhl was a Presbyterian. He worked in public education before entering politics. He was a teacher and coach in the Ferndale Area School District in Cambria County, Pennsylvania. Pfuhl also served in the Pennsylvania National Guard.

=== Mayor of Johnstown ===
Pfuhl served six terms as Mayor of Johnstown, the longest tenure of any chief executive in city history. He helped guide Johnstown's transition from a commission government to a local government consisting of a strong mayor and city council. He helped move Johnstown to its present system of governing based on a city manager.

Pfuhl ran for Mayor of Johnstown during six mayoral elections, winning five of the six campaigns. He was elected as a Republican, despite Johnstown's reputation as a stronghold of the Democratic Party. Pfuhl was elected to his first term as mayor in the 1971 election.

Pfuhl was mayor of Johnstown during the July 1977 flood, which devastated the city and the local economy. The flood heavily damaged the facilities of Bethlehem Steel, which was Johnstown's major employer at the time, with 12,000 employees during pre-flood 1977. Bethlehem Steel lost more than $50 million in the flood, resulting in 4,000 layoffs.

Pfuhl accused Bethlehem Steel of using the flood as an excuse to pull some of its investments from the area. The business district was heavily flooded, closing both of the city's department stores, Penn Traffic and Glosser Bros. Pennsylvania Gov. Milton Shapp gave Pfuhl a hand-written letter after the flood, authorizing Pfuhl to waive the usual regulations and solicitation process for the clean-up.

Pfuhl lost his re-election bid in 1977 to Democrat Charles "Kutch" Tomljanovic, largely due to the aftermath of the 1977 Johnstown flood, which proved one of the biggest challenges of his political career.

Pfuhl remained out of office for just one term before being re-elected as mayor in the 1981 election and re-took the mayor's office in 1982. In October 1986, Pfuhl appointed Linda Weaver as Johnstown's police chief. The appointment made Weaver the first female police chief in Pennsylvania. She retired on March 5, 1993. Pfuhl announced his retirement in February 1993, when he announced that he would not seek re-election in the November 1993 mayoral election. In his announcement, Pfuhl told the audience, "I love my family, I love my city, I love this job. And I really feel I've been pretty good at it." Weaver would later succeed Pfuhl as the mayor of Johnstown, assuming the office in 1994. and remaining in office until 1996

Pfuhl died at Memorial Medical Center in Johnstown, Pennsylvania, on August 19, 2011, aged 83. He was survived by his wife of 64 years, the former Phyllis I. Meyer, and five children. He was buried at Grandview Cemetery at the mausoleum in Westmont, Pennsylvania.
