= Galliker's =

American food company

Galliker Dairy Company
- Company type: Private
- Industry: Dairy
- Founded: March 25, 1914
- Headquarters: Johnstown, Pennsylvania
- Area served: North America
- Key people: Louis G. Galliker III (President)
- Website: Gallikers.com

Galliker Dairy Company or "Galliker's" is a fourth-generation, family-held, private business located in Johnstown, Pennsylvania. Galliker's primary products include milk, ice cream, juice, and iced tea.

== History ==
The Galliker Dairy Company was founded on March 25, 1914, when Louis Galliker purchased the Shreve Ice Cream Company located in Johnstown, Pennsylvania. The new company was first known as the Galliker Ice Cream Company.

Ice cream was the firm's only product until competition forced the company into the milk business in 1925. In the early days, the firm made ice cream at 451-453 Franklin Street and processed milk and had its garage at the corner of Haynes and Sherman Streets, Johnstown. Louis Galliker died in January 1937, and was succeeded by his widow, Pauline H. Galliker, who had been active in the business from its founding.

The company purchased a property on Napoleon Street for garage purposes in 1940. In 1943, the company changed its name to the Galliker Dairy Company. In 1946, William M. Galliker was elected president and Louis G. Galliker, Jr., was elected secretary-treasurer. In 1965, Louis G. Galliker, Jr., died and in 1968, William M. Galliker retired. At that time, Louis G. Galliker III assumed leadership of the company.

A new plant was opened in the Johnstown Industrial Park in late 1973 and processing plant, Potomac Farms Dairy, located in Cumberland, Maryland, was acquired in March 1984.

In March 1990, the Galliker Dairy Company became one of the first dairies in the country to offer its milk in a container that protects milk from the adverse effects of light. The innovation was trademarked the "Lightsafe Yellow Jug." The Lightsafe Yellow Jug has become one of Galliker’s signature products. It is widely recognized within the marketplace as a symbol for quality and freshness.

== Production and Distribution ==
The company uses two primary processing plants. The main plant is located at the headquarters in Johnstown, PA and the other in Cumberland, MD.

=== Distribution ===
As of August 17, 2011 The company also uses eleven distribution areas to distribute their brand throughout the Mid-Atlantic and South Atlantic regions of the United States. The locations of the distribution depots include:

- Altoona, PA
- Bedford, PA
- Carlisle, PA
- Punxsutawney, PA
- State College, PA;
- Freeport, PA,
- Meadville, PA
- Oakland, MD
- Culpeper, VA
- Harrisonburg, VA
- Moorefield, WV

The majority of product distributed by means of depots reach throughout major portions of central and western Pennsylvania, Maryland, parts of Ohio, Virginia, West Virginia, New York, New Jersey and North Carolina.
