= AmeriServ Financial =

Pennsylvanian bank holding company

AmeriServ Financial, Inc.
- Company type: Public
- Traded as: Nasdaq: ASRV; Russell Microcap Index component
- Industry: Banking
- Founded: 1983; 43 years ago
- Headquarters: Johnstown, Pennsylvania
- Key people: Craig G. Ford (chairman); Jeffrey A. Stopko (CEO & President); Michael D. Lynch (CFO)
- Total assets: ▲$1.167 billion (2017)
- Total equity: ▼$0.095 billion (2017)
- Number of employees: 305 (2017)
- Website: www.ameriserv.com

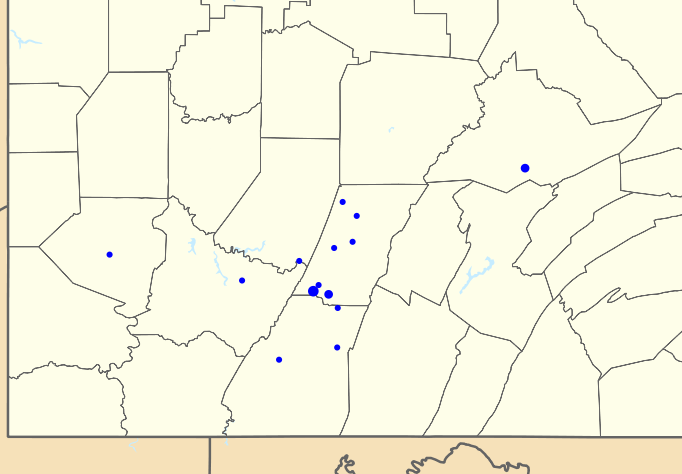
AmeriServ branch footprint in southwest Pennsylvania.

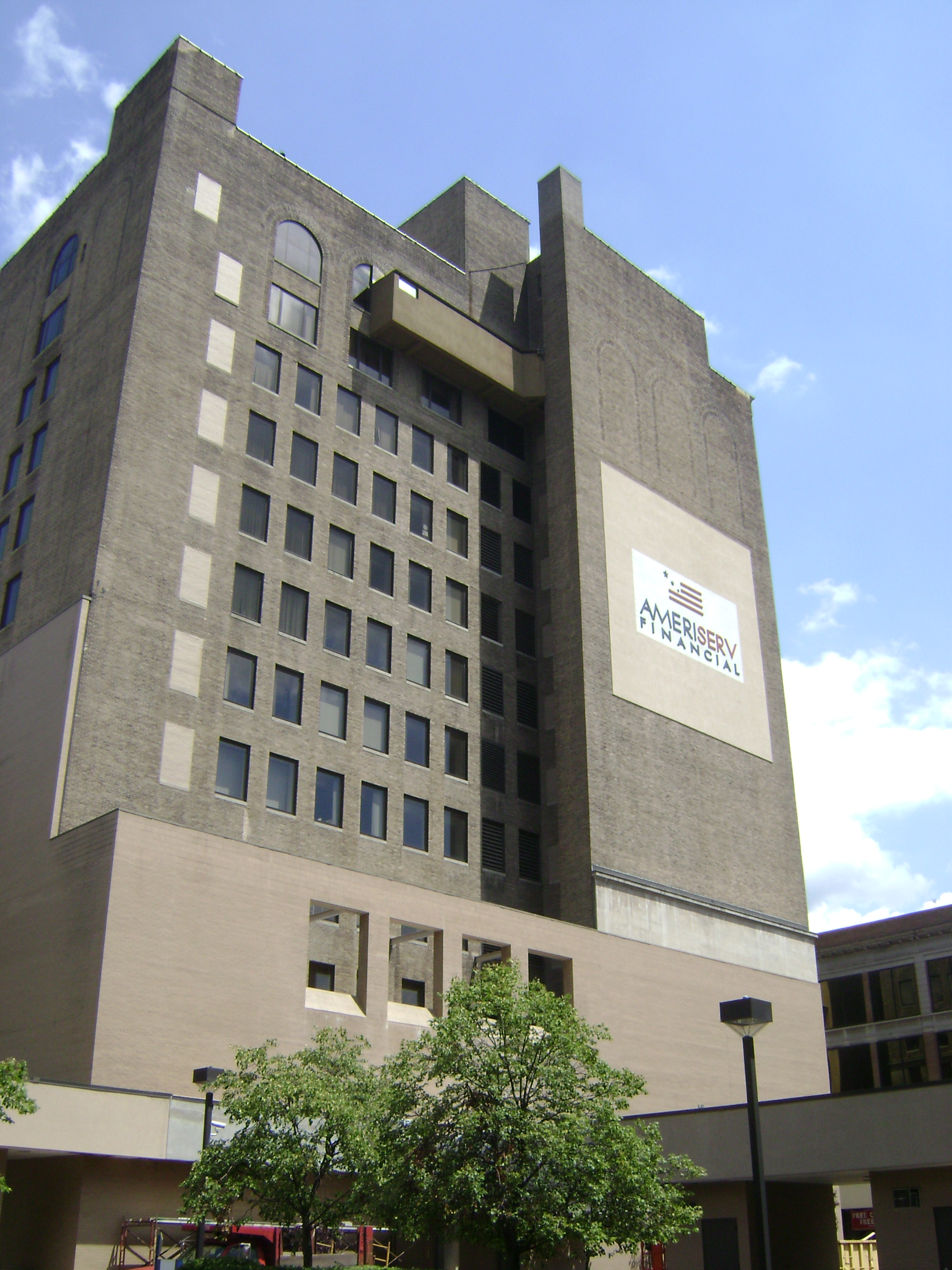
2008 photo of Ameriserv Financial headquarters building in Johnstown, Pennsylvania, on the corner of Main and Franklin Streets.

AmeriServ Financial, Inc. is a bank holding company based in Johnstown, Pennsylvania. It operates AmeriServ Financial Bank, AmeriServ Trust and Financial Services Company, and AmeriServ Life Insurance Company. The bank operates 16 automated teller machines.

Since 1996, the company has been the main sponsor of the Flood City Music Festival in Johnstown, Pennsylvania.

== History ==
In January 1983, USBANCORP, INC. was formed as a bank holding company.

In October 1987, AmeriServ Life Insurance Company was formed.

In October 1992, AmeriServ Trust and Financial Services Company was formed.

In May 2001, the company changed its name to AmeriServ Financial, Inc.

In March 2007, the company acquired West Chester Capital Advisors.

In 2009, the company sold its corporate trust bond administration business to U.S. Bancorp.

In August 2011, the company received $21 million from the Small Business Lending Fund, which it used to repay the $21 million investment it received from the United States Department of the Treasury as part of the Troubled Asset Relief Program.

In March 2015, Jeffrey A. Stopko was promoted to chief executive officer of the company.
