= Stone Bridge (Johnstown, Pennsylvania) =

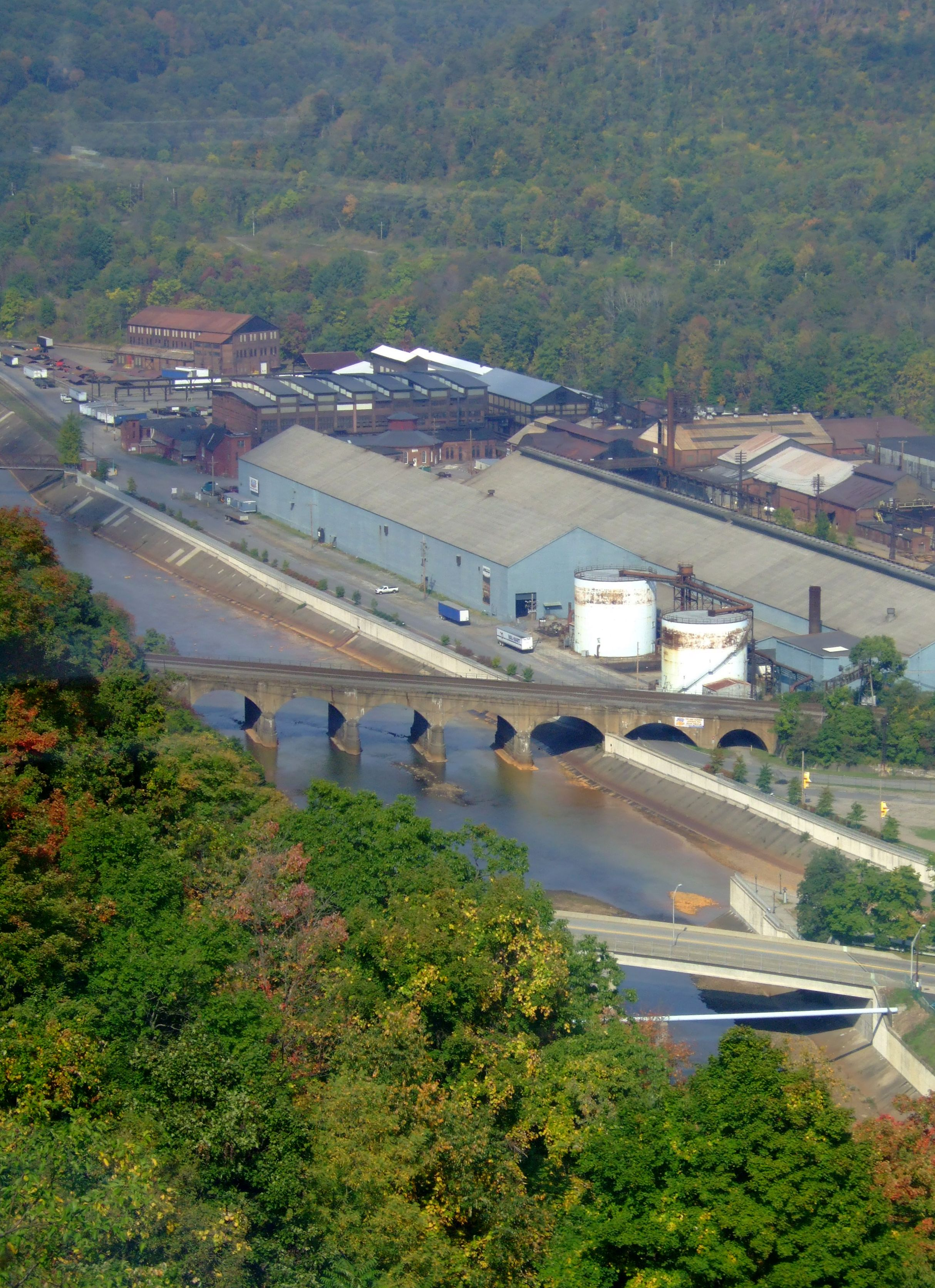
- Stone Bridge from the overlook
- Coordinates: 40.3325°N 78.9249°W
- Carries: railroad traffic
- Crosses: Conemaugh River
- Locale: Johnstown, Pennsylvania, USA
- Official name: Conemaugh River Viaduct

Characteristics
- Design: arch bridge
- Material: Stone
- Total length: 428 feet (130 m)
- Width: four tracks
- Longest span: 58 feet (18 m)
- No. of spans: 7
- Piers in water: 4

History
- Construction start: 1887
- Construction end: 1888

Location
- Interactive map of Stone Bridge

The Stone Bridge spans the Conemaugh River in Johnstown, Pennsylvania. The bridge is a seven-arch stone railroad bridge located on the Norfolk Southern Railway's Pittsburgh Line, built by the Pennsylvania Railroad in 1887–88. Its upstream face was reinforced with concrete in 1929.

This bridge survived the Johnstown Flood of 1889, but the bridge blocked debris across the river. These materials, including barbed wire, subsequently caught fire and created an inferno covering 30 acres (120,000 m^{2}). Scores of people were trapped and killed. The bridge is visible from Point Park in downtown Johnstown.

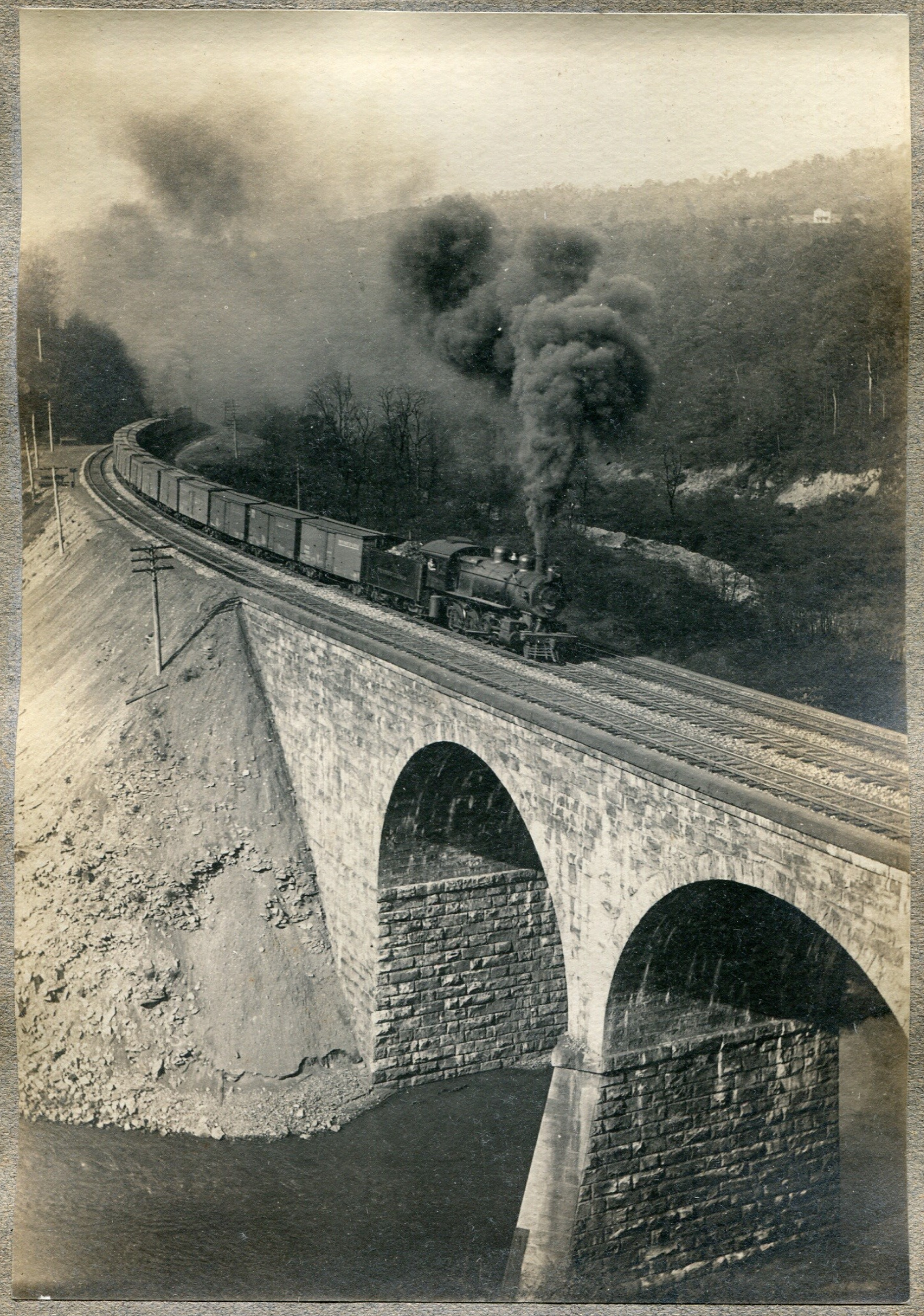

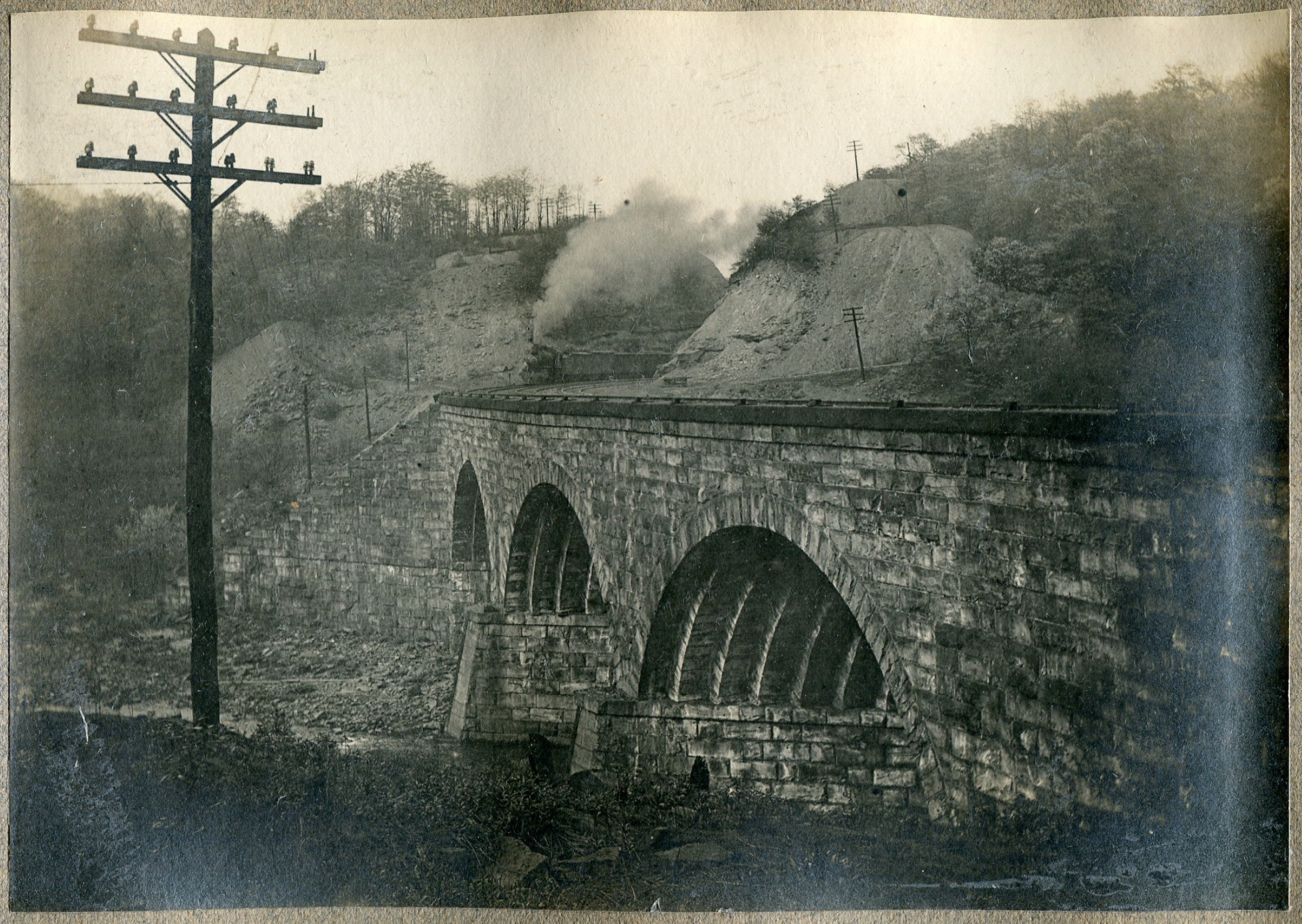
Stone Bridge c. 1905

== Stone Bridge project ==
The Stone Bridge, located on the edge of Johnstown's downtown, is an arched bridge built by the Pennsylvania Railroad in 1887. On May 31, 1889, its seven arches blocked tons of debris, carried by the Johnstown Flood, including miles of barbed wire twisted through it from the destruction of a plant. The bridge withstood the force of the flood and this load. But an enormous fire broke out in the debris at the bridge, killing scores of people trapped within it, and burning for three days.

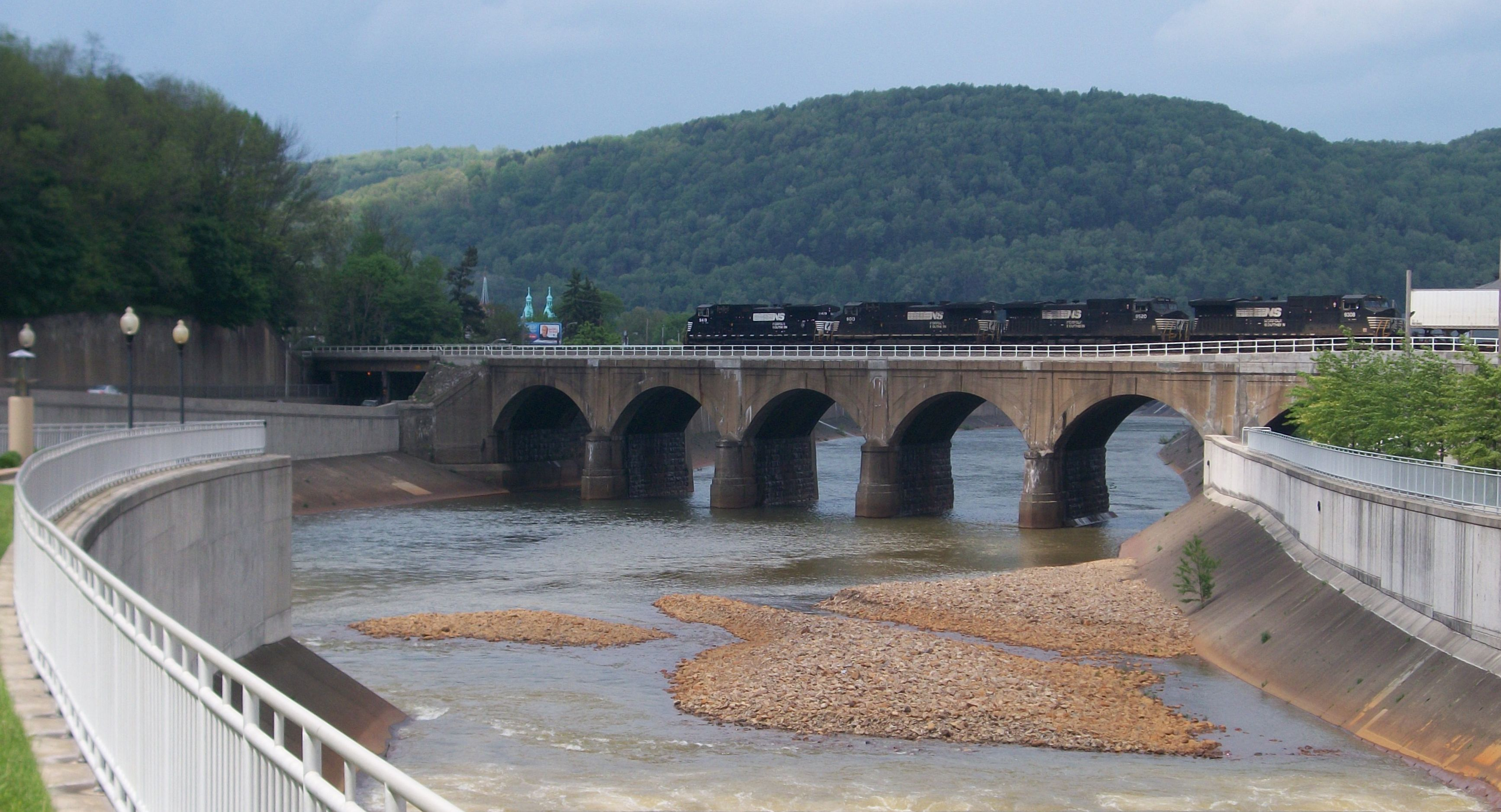
Closer view, with rail traffic

A Johnstown landmark, the three-track bridge is still used by the railroad. It is now owned by the Norfolk Southern Railway. Route 56, the most heavily traveled road in the region, passes nearby. The bridge is highly visible from Route 56, downtown, the Johnstown Area Heritage Association's (JAHA) newly established Festival Park, and the restaurant and visitors center above the city at the Inclined Plane. The bridge needed restoration, as its stone façade had long since been covered with concrete, added when the bridge was expanded with a third track, and its general appearance was poor.

A bridge restoration project was developed by community leaders, to include cleaning and physical and aesthetic improvements, resurfacing of the south side, and new lighting with energy-efficient LED lighting adjustable to different colors and intensities. Estimated to cost $1.2 million, the project was initiated in 2008 as part of flood commemorative activities.

Michael Brosig, co-chair of the Stone Bridge Committee, said,

The significance of the Stone Bridge is that it stood its ground against the flood waters and altered the future of Johnstown completely and forever. It created the backdrop for the event that put Johnstown on the map. Restoring the South facade of that structure and casting LED lighting on it will certainly showcase the triumph of the human spirit in a spectacular style for all to see, enjoy and be proud of their heritage. Based on its strategic location, it is the linchpin of the historic district of our city.

Consultants on the bridge restoration project included Shadowstone, Inc., of Clifton, New Jersey, for the lighting. For the bridge restoration and rehabilitation, the group worked with Pawlowski & Haman Architects, P.C., and H. F. Lenz Co., both of Johnstown.

== See also ==
- List of bridges documented by the Historic American Engineering Record in Pennsylvania
