= Cambria City Historic District =

Historic district in Pennsylvania, United States

- U.S. National Register of Historic Places
- U.S. Historic district
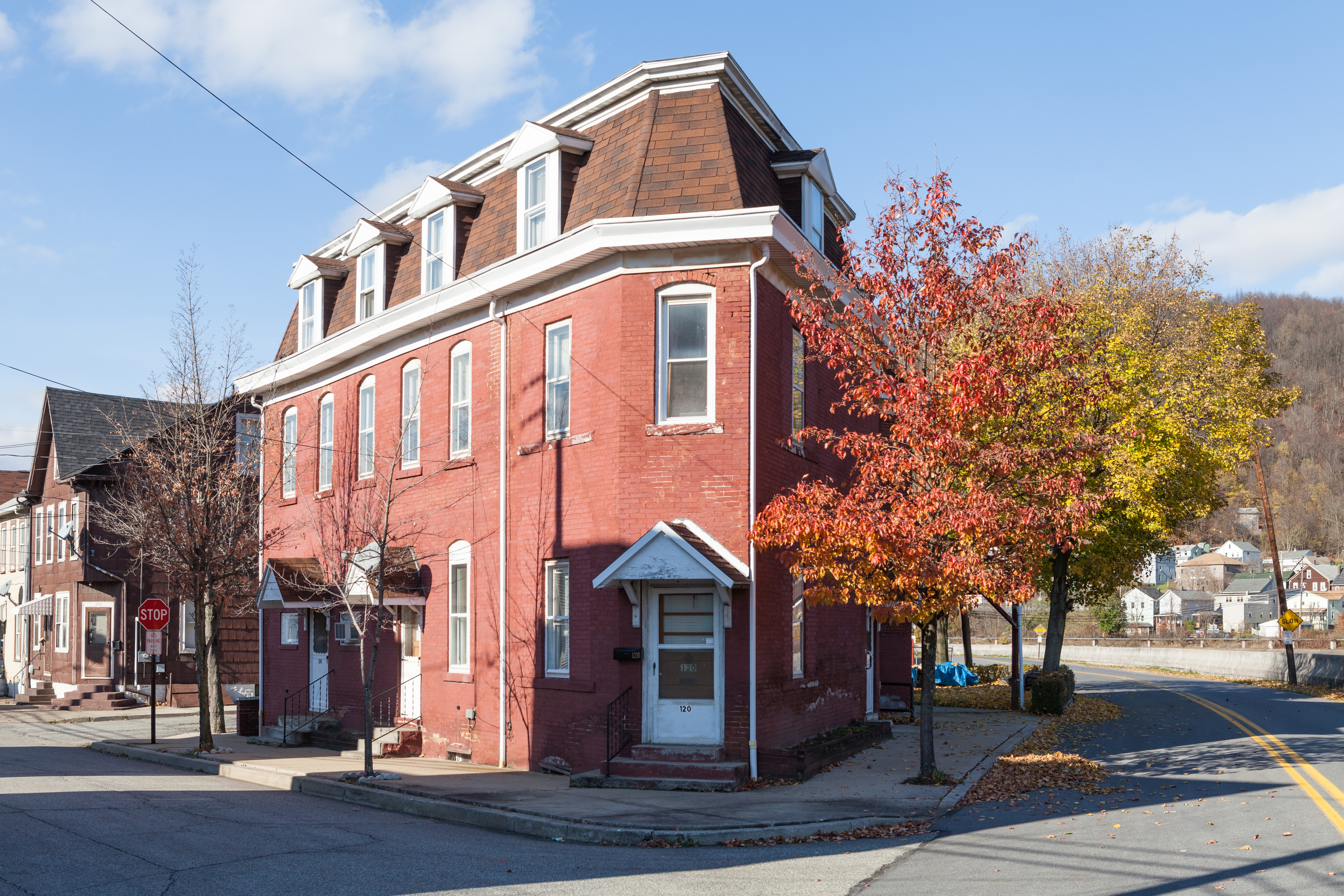
- 120 Chestnut St in the district

- Location within Pennsylvania Location within the United States
- Location: Roughly bounded by Broad St., Tenth Ave. and the Conemaugh River, Johnstown, Pennsylvania
- Coordinates: 40°20′27″N 78°55′46″W
- Area: 39 acres (16 ha)
- Built: 1889
- Architect: Multiple
- Architectural style: Queen Anne, Second Empire
- NRHP reference No.: 91001706
- Added to NRHP: November 14, 1991

Cambria City Historic District is a national historic district located at Johnstown in Cambria County, Pennsylvania, United States. The district includes 198 contributing buildings and 1 contributing structure in a predominantly working-class residential area of Johnstown. Though predominantly residential, it also includes a small business district and industrial buildings such as a former brewery, bottling plant, and slaughter house, along with a notable collection of churches, schools, and a fire station. The district includes some buildings dated before the Johnstown Flood, but the majority date from 1890 to 1920. Notable buildings include the collection of two-story, balloon frame, detached and semi-detached dwellings, Fifth Avenue Hotel (1889), Pollack Building (1905), former Cambria Fire Hose and Ladder Company (1890), former Germana Brewery (1907), August and Louisa Mayer Building (1907), Tulip Bottling Company (1913-1949), St. Casimer's Polish Church (1907), Immaculate Conception Church (1908), St. Stephen's Slovak Church (1914), St. Columba Church (1914), St. Mary's Greek Catholic Church (1922), Venue Of Merging Arts (formerly St. George's Orthodox Church, 1911), Hungarian Reformed Church (1902), and First Catholic Slovak Band Hall (1913-1949). The contributing structure is the Minersville Bridge (1914).

It was listed on the National Register of Historic Places in 1991.
