= Old Conemaugh Borough Historic District =

Historic district in Pennsylvania, United States

- U.S. National Register of Historic Places
- U.S. Historic district
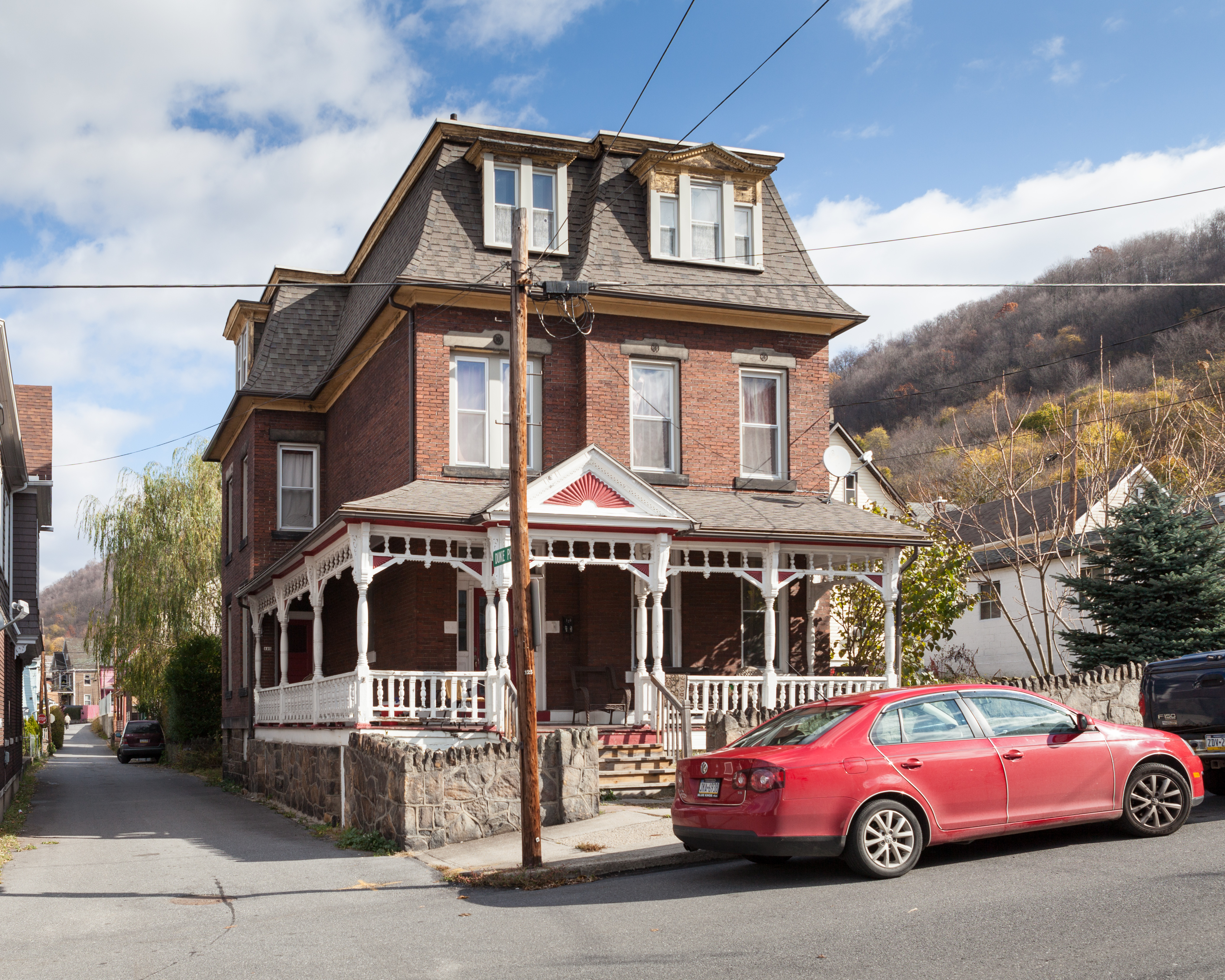
- 1870 W. H. Smith Residence, a Victorian mansion in the district

- Location within Pennsylvania Location within the United States
- Location: Roughly bounded by Railroad, Adams, and Steel Sts., and Church Ave., Johnstown, Pennsylvania
- Coordinates: 40°19′37″N 78°54′39″W
- Area: 33 acres (13 ha)
- Built: 1878
- Architect: Myton, Walter; et al.
- Architectural style: Queen Anne, Second Empire
- NRHP reference No.: 95001253
- Added to NRHP: November 7, 1995

The Old Conemaugh Borough Historic District is a national historic district that is located in Johnstown in Cambria County, Pennsylvania, United States.

It was listed on the National Register of Historic Places in 1995.

== History and architectural features ==
This district encompasses 330 contributing buildings that are located in a predominantly working-class residential area in Johnstown, and includes a few examples of high-style, Victorian-era dwellings that represent the Queen Anne and Second Empire styles.

Notable buildings include the Young House (c. 1850), which is located on Coal Street. Described as "a plank building within a larger balloon house," it still has its original door latch hardware and end chimneys, as well as ornamental fireplaces "with carved Indian Heads."

Also notable are the Christian Kakuck House (1888), the Spenger House (c. 1890), the W. H. Smith Residence (c. 1870), the Otto M. Hornick House (1904), the American House (1832), the Brass Rail Bar (c. 1890), St. Joseph's German Catholic Church (1868), Central Catholic School (1906), and the Hudson Street School (1895, 1924).
