= National Register of Historic Places listings in Cambria County, Pennsylvania =

Location of Cambria County in Pennsylvania

This is a list of the National Register of Historic Places listings in Cambria County, Pennsylvania.

This is intended to be a complete list of the properties and districts on National Register of Historic Places in the Cambria County, Pennsylvania. The locations of National Register properties and districts for which the latitude and longitude coordinates are included below, may be seen in a map.

There are 34 properties and districts listed on the National Register in the county. Two sites are further designated as National Historic Landmarks and another is designated as a National Memorial.

This National Park Service list is complete through NPS recent listings posted May 1, 2026.

== Current listings ==
| | Name on the Register | Image | Date listed | Location | Municipality | Description |
|---|---|---|---|---|---|---|
| 1 | Allegheny Portage Railroad National Historic Site | Allegheny Portage Railroad National Historic Site | October 15, 1966 (#66000648) | U.S. Route 22; 40°24′47″N 78°27′37″W | Conemaugh and Cresson Townships | Extends into Allegheny Township in Blair County |
| 2 | Berwind-White Mine 40 Historic District | Berwind-White Mine 40 Historic District | April 28, 1992 (#92000392) | Roughly bounded by the boney pile, the Eureka No. 40 mine site, the Scalp Level borough line, and the Berwind-White Farmstead; 40°15′13″N 78°50′21″W | Richland Township and Scalp Level | Mining patch town. |
| 3 | Bridge in Johnstown City | Bridge in Johnstown City | June 22, 1988 (#88000805) | State Route 3022 spur over the Stonycreek River; 40°19′33″N 78°55′33″W | Johnstown | |
| 4 | Bridge in Portage Township | Bridge in Portage Township | June 22, 1988 (#88000782) | Pennsylvania Route 53 over Bens Creek; 40°24′08″N 78°38′24″W | Portage Township | |
| 5 | A.W. Buck House | A.W. Buck House | May 12, 1995 (#95000521) | 615 North Center Street; 40°29′22″N 78°43′31″W | Ebensburg | |
| 6 | Cambria City Historic District | Cambria City Historic District | November 14, 1991 (#91001706) | Roughly bounded by Broad Street, Tenth Avenue, and the Conemaugh River; 40°20′27″N 78°55′46″W | Johnstown | |
| 7 | Cambria County Courthouse | Cambria County Courthouse | June 30, 1980 (#80003449) | Center Street; 40°29′01″N 78°43′29″W | Ebensburg | |
| 8 | Cambria County Jail | Cambria County Jail | June 30, 1980 (#80003450) | North Center and Sample Streets; 40°29′11″N 78°43′34″W | Ebensburg | |
| 9 | Cambria Iron Company | Cambria Iron Company | June 22, 1989 (#89001101) | Five industrial complexes along the Conemaugh River in or near Johnstown; 40°19′42″N 78°55′13″W | Johnstown | |
| 10 | Cambria Public Library Building | Cambria Public Library Building | June 19, 1972 (#72001100) | 304 Washington Street; 40°19′40″N 78°55′15″W | Johnstown | |
| 11 | Colver Historic District | Colver Historic District | June 3, 1994 (#94000521) | Roughly bounded by Ninth Avenue, the Ebensburg Coal Company Power Building, and Bakerville, in Colver; 40°32′36″N 78°47′46″W | Barr, Blacklick, and Cambria Townships | |
| 12 | Downtown Johnstown Historic District | Downtown Johnstown Historic District | August 7, 1992 (#92000941) | Bounded by Washington, Clinton, Bedford, Vine, Market, Locust, and Walnut Streets; 40°19′30″N 78°55′07″W | Johnstown | |
| 13 | Ebensburg Historic District | Ebensburg Historic District | September 10, 2019 (#100004163) | Bounded Roughly by Highland Ave., West St., Sugar St., and Triumph St. 40°29′10″N 78°43′30″W | Ebensburg | |
| 14 | Eliza Furnace | Eliza Furnace | September 6, 1991 (#91001138) | Lower Main Street; 40°29′03″N 78°55′20″W | Vintondale | Extends into Indiana County |
| 15 | First Cambria AME Zion Church | | April 10, 2025 (#100011622) | 409-411 Haynes Street; 40°19′12″N 78°55′17″W | Johnstown | |
| 16 | Grand Army of the Republic Hall | Grand Army of the Republic Hall | April 17, 1980 (#80003451) | 132 Park Place; 40°19′34″N 78°55′07″W | Johnstown | |
| 17 | Grandview Cemetery | Grandview Cemetery | May 14, 2025 (#100011822) | 801 Millcreek Road; 40°19′00″N 78°55′35″W | Johnstown | |
| 18 | Johnstown Flood National Memorial | Johnstown Flood National Memorial | October 15, 1966 (#66000656) | 733 Lake Road; 40°20′46″N 78°46′14″W | Adams and Croyle Townships | Updated listing approved July 26, 2024. |
| 19 | Johnstown Inclined Railway | Johnstown Inclined Railway | June 18, 1973 (#73001597) | Between Johns Street and Edgehill Drive; 40°19′32″N 78°55′43″W | Johnstown | |
| 20 | Johnstown Masonic Temple | | August 13, 2025 (#100012125) | 130 Valley Pike; 40°18′18″N 78°54′45″W | Johnstown | |
| 21 | Benjamin F. Jones Cottage | Benjamin F. Jones Cottage | February 24, 1995 (#95000125) | Third Street; 40°27′27″N 78°35′30″W | Cresson Township | |
| 22 | Lilly Bridge | Lilly Bridge | June 22, 1988 (#88000785) | Pennsylvania Route 53 over Burgoon Run; 40°25′26″N 78°37′08″W | Lilly | |
| 23 | Minersville Historic District | Minersville Historic District | April 27, 1995 (#95000522) | Roughly along Connelly Avenue, Honan Avenue, Garvey Place, and Iron Street; 40°20′34″N 78°55′35″W | Johnstown and West Taylor Township | |
| 24 | Moxham Historic District | Moxham Historic District | March 12, 1999 (#99000324) | Roughly bounded by Dupont Street, Linden Avenue, Village Street, and Park and Coleman Avenues; 40°17′52″N 78°54′30″W | Johnstown | |
| 25 | Nathan's Department Store | Nathan's Department Store | August 10, 1979 (#79002178) | 426–432 Main St. 40°19′31″N 78°55′08″W | Johnstown | |
| 26 | Philip Noon House | Philip Noon House | August 23, 1984 (#84003179) | 114 East High Street; 40°29′05″N 78°43′29″W | Ebensburg | |
| 27 | Old Conemaugh Borough Historic District | Old Conemaugh Borough Historic District | November 7, 1995 (#95001253) | Roughly bounded by Railroad, Adams, and Steel Streets, and Church Avenue; 40°19′37″N 78°54′39″W | Johnstown | |
| 28 | Patton Historic District | Patton Historic District | June 28, 1996 (#96000714) | Roughly bounded by 5th, Beech, 6th, and Palmer Avenues and Terra Cotta Street; 40°38′10″N 78°39′04″W | Patton | |
| 29 | Portage Historic District | Portage Historic District | July 21, 1995 (#95000890) | Roughly bounded by North Railroad Avenue, Prospect Street, Johnson Avenue, and Vine Street; 40°23′07″N 78°40′23″W | Portage | |
| 30 | Revloc Historic District | Revloc Historic District | May 11, 1995 (#95000520) | Roughly bounded by Highland Avenue, Fourth Street, Penn Avenue, and Eighth Street in Revloc; 40°29′27″N 78°45′52″W | Cambria Township | |
| 31 | South Fork Fishing and Hunting Club Historic District | South Fork Fishing and Hunting Club Historic District | July 31, 1986 (#86002091) | Roughly bounded by Fortieth, Main, and Lake Streets; 40°20′17″N 78°46′24″W | Adams Township | |
| 32 | Staple Bend Tunnel | Staple Bend Tunnel | April 19, 1994 (#94001187) | Junction of Legislative Route 3035 and Mineral Point; 40°21′33″N 78°51′19″W | Conemaugh Township | |
| 33 | Westmont Historic District | Westmont Historic District | February 24, 1995 (#95000131) | Roughly bounded by Clarion Street, Edgehill Drive, Blair and Wayne Streets, Diamond Boulevard, and Stackhouse Park; 40°19′20″N 78°56′19″W | Westmont | |
| 34 | Windber Historic District | Windber Historic District | November 14, 1991 (#91001705) | Roughly bounded by the borough line, Cambria Avenue, 28th Street, and Big Paint Creek; 40°14′10″N 78°49′55″W | Scalp Level | Extends into Somerset County |

== See also ==
- List of Pennsylvania state historical markers in Cambria County
