= Colver =

Colver may refer to:

- Colver (surname), a surname
- Colver, Pennsylvania, an unincorporated community and census-designated place in Cambria County, Pennsylvania, United States
- Colver Historic District, a national historic district in Cambria County, Pennsylvania
