= Johnstown Inclined Plane =

Funicular in Johnstown, Pennsylvania

Coordinates: 40°19′32″N 78°55′43″W

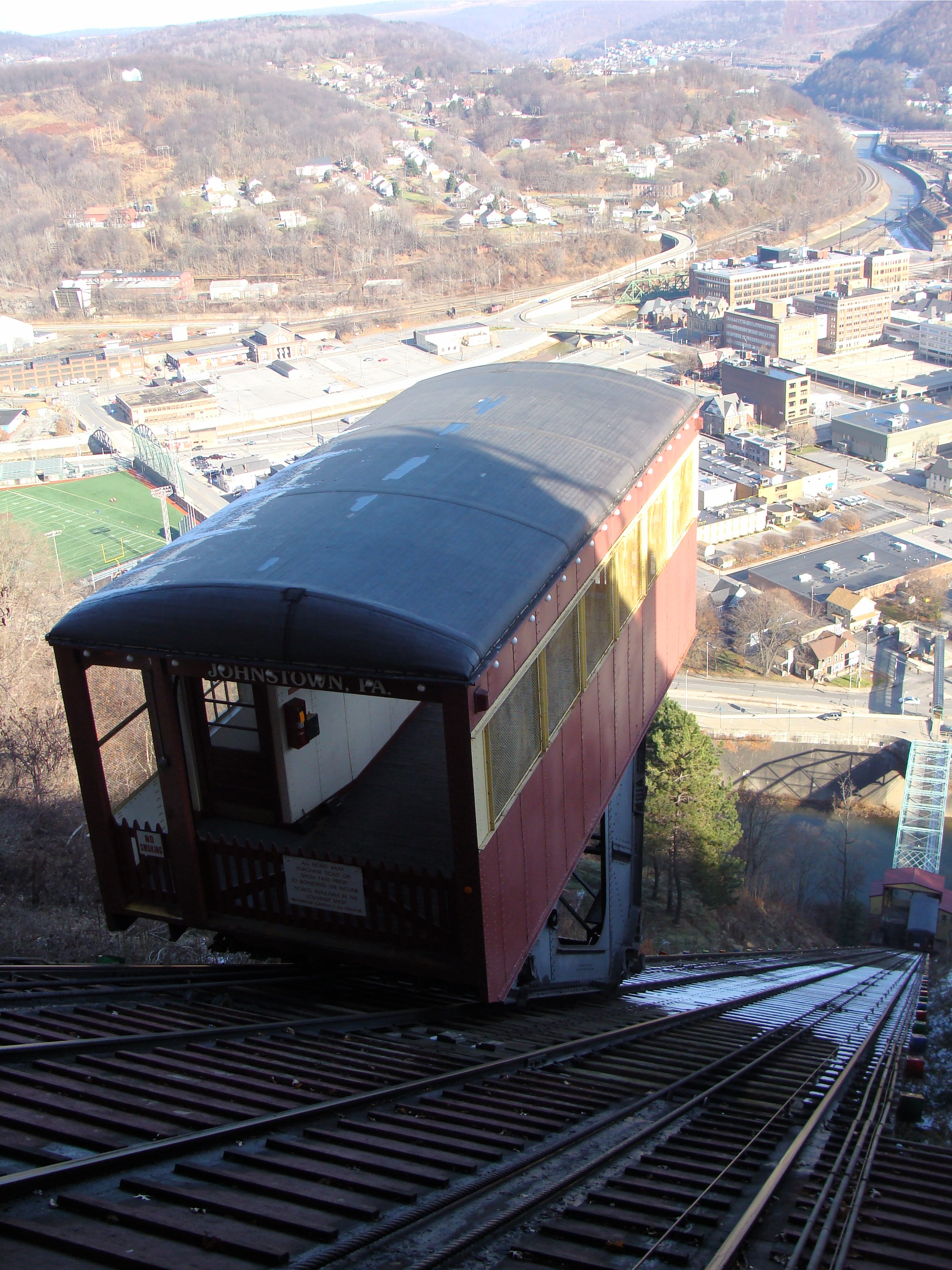

Overview
- Locale: Johnstown, Pennsylvania; United States
- Transit type: Funicular
- Annual ridership: 20,193 (2021) ▼50.5%
- Website: www.inclinedplane.org

U.S. National Register of Historic Places
- Official name: Johnstown Inclined Railway
- Designated: June 18, 1973
- Reference no.: 73001597
- Architect: Samuel Diescher

Historic Mechanical Engineering Landmark
- Official name: Johnstown Incline
- Designated: September 1994
- Reference no.: 180

Operation
- Began operation: June 1, 1891
- Operator: CamTran

Technical
- System length: 896.5 ft (273.3 m)
- Track gauge: 8 ft (2,440 mm)

The Johnstown Inclined Plane is a funicular in Johnstown, Cambria County, Pennsylvania, U.S. The incline and its two stations connect the city of Johnstown, situated in a valley at the confluence of the Stonycreek and the Little Conemaugh rivers, to the borough of Westmont on Yoder Hill. Designed by Hungarian-American engineer Samuel Diescher, it was completed in 1891 following the Johnstown Flood two years prior. The funicular was intended to serve as an escape route during floods—a purpose it served during the Johnstown floods of 1936 and 1977—as well as a convenient mode of transportation for residents atop Yoder Hill. With a grade of approximately 72%, it holds the Guinness World Record as the steepest vehicular funicular in the world. The incline is listed on the National Register of Historic Places and is designated a Historic Mechanical Engineering Landmark.

The funicular consists of two cars running on parallel tracks, which travel an 896.5-foot-long (273.3 m) route and ascend 502.5 feet (153.2 m) vertically, making the journey in 90 seconds. The cars are open to the elements, with an enclosed seating area, and can carry both passengers and automobiles. The cables connecting the cars are steel wire rope, wound around a drum that is powered by an electric motor. As one car descends, the other ascends and acts as a counterweight. The incline's upper station in Westmont contains a visitor center, gift shop, and observation deck, while the lower station in Johnstown is accessed by the Inclined Plane Bridge.

Originally operated by Cambria Iron Company and its successor Bethlehem Steel, the Johnstown Incline was initially well-used, but ridership began to decline after 1919 because of the growing popularity of automobiles. Following two attempts to close it down, the funicular was sold to the borough of Westmont in 1935. The incline was briefly shut down in January 1962 when its supply of power from Bethlehem Steel was terminated, and the Cambria County Tourist Council took over operations that July following a renovation. The Cambria County Transit Authority (now CamTran) took over the incline in 1983, and the funicular reopened in August 1984 following an 18-month renovation. The incline's lower station was temporarily closed in the early 2000s due to the replacement of the Inclined Plane Bridge. The incline closed in 2021 for an extensive rehabilitation project and reopened to the public on September 10, 2026.

== Design ==
=== Route and tracks ===
The Johnstown Inclined Plane was designed by Hungarian-American engineer Samuel Diescher, who had also designed the Duquesne, Castle Shannon and Fort Pitt inclines in Pittsburgh. The funicular consists of a parallel set of 8 ft (2,440 mm) broad gauge railroad tracks. With a grade of approximately 72%, (Note: Various sources use 71.9 percent or exactly 72 percent as the grade of the incline. Other sources give a figure of 71 percent.) it holds the Guinness World Record as the steepest vehicular funicular in the world. The incline is 896.5 feet (273.3 m) long, ascending 502.5 feet (153.2 m) vertically to the top of Yoder Hill and the borough of Westmont. The upper station, atop Yoder Hill, is at an elevation of 1,693.5 feet (516.2 m) above sea level. (Note: The funicular's engineer, Samuel Diescher, wrote in 1897 that the incline was 895 feet (273 m) long and that it rose 581 feet (177 m).) Originally, each station had wrought-iron railings and boom barriers.

The rails are supported by 720 railroad ties made from Southern Yellow Pine, each measuring 14 feet (4.3 m) long. The incline is illuminated at night by 114 high-pressure sodium-vapor lamps mounted along the sides of tracks. There was a stairway between the tracks with 966 steps; this was removed c. 1963.

=== Vehicles ===
Two cars traverse the slope; as one descends, the other ascends and acts as a counterweight. The cars are 15 feet 6 inches (4.7 m) wide and about 34 feet (10 m) long, with a roof measuring 15 feet 2 inches (4.62 m) high. Each car has space for either 65 people, 6 motorcycles, or an automobile. Although the cars are open to the elements, an enclosed seating area with a bench is situated along the outer side of the incline.

The cables connecting the cars are 2-inch-diameter (50.8 mm), 6×36 right regular lay, steel wire rope. They are wound around a 3-short-ton (2.7-metric-ton; 2.7-long-ton), 16-foot-diameter (5 m) drum that connects the cars. The cable on the north track is 1,075 feet (328 m) long, while the south cable is 7 feet (2.13 m) shorter. Each car weighs 22 short tons (20.0 metric tons; 19.6 long tons), but they and the cables can carry an additional load of 15 short tons (13.6 metric tons; 13.4 long tons). A 400-horsepower (298 kW) electric motor drives the drum, simultaneously winding and unwinding the cable, to propel the incline. The Johnstown Inclined Plane is unusual in that the motor and winch are located at a 90-degree angle to the incline instead of directly underneath it. Operation of the incline is controlled via a foot pedal located in a booth in the upper station.

An emergency brake engages if the air pressure needed to control the incline is insufficient; the brake also engages if a dead man's switch is tripped in the operator's booth. In addition to the hauling cables, a 972-foot (296 m) safety cable capable of withstanding 165 short tons (149.7 metric tons; 147.3 long tons) is connected to the cars.

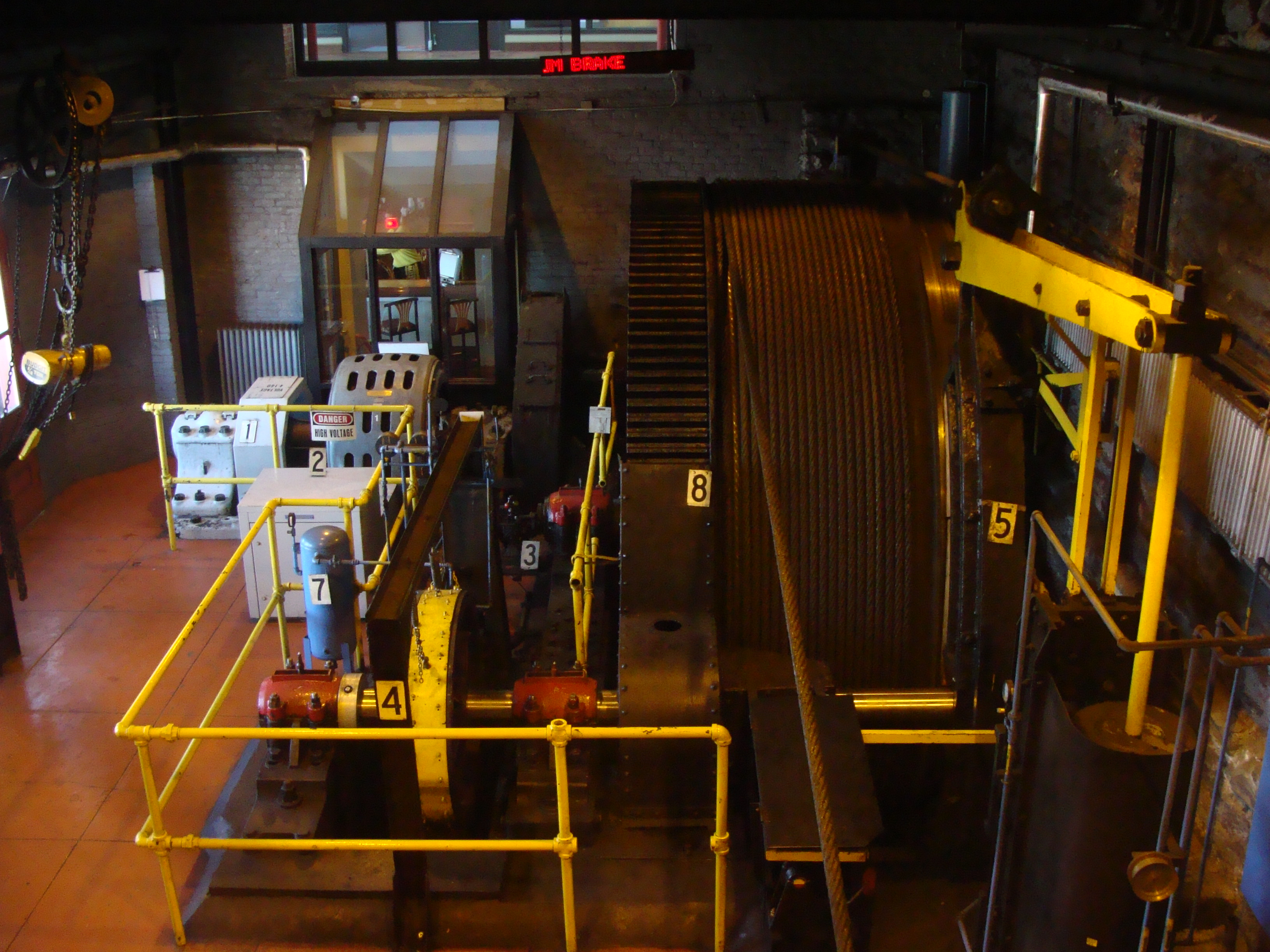
The room that houses the incline's hoisting mechanisms

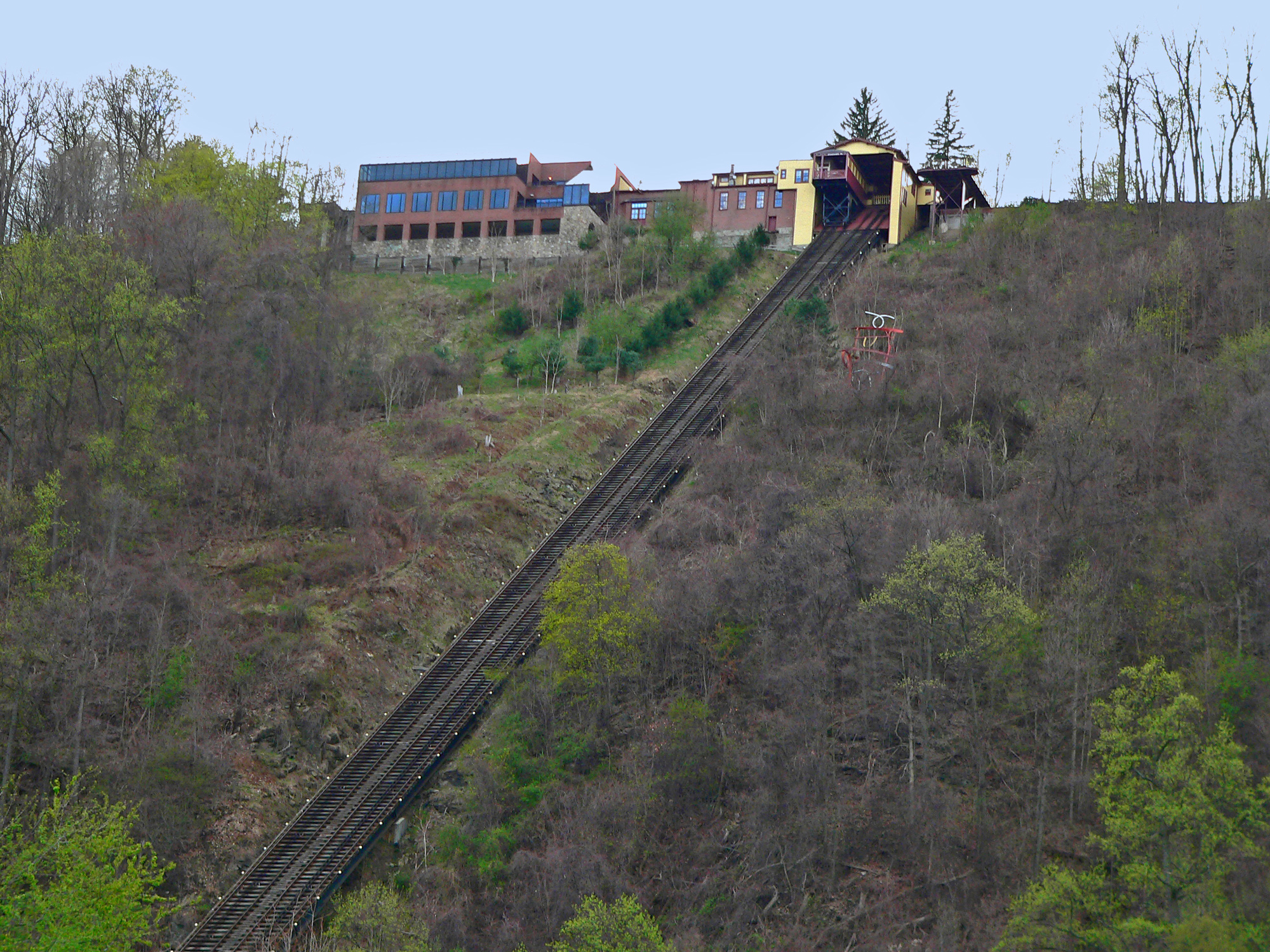
The upper station has an observation deck and visitor center/restaurant adjacent to it.

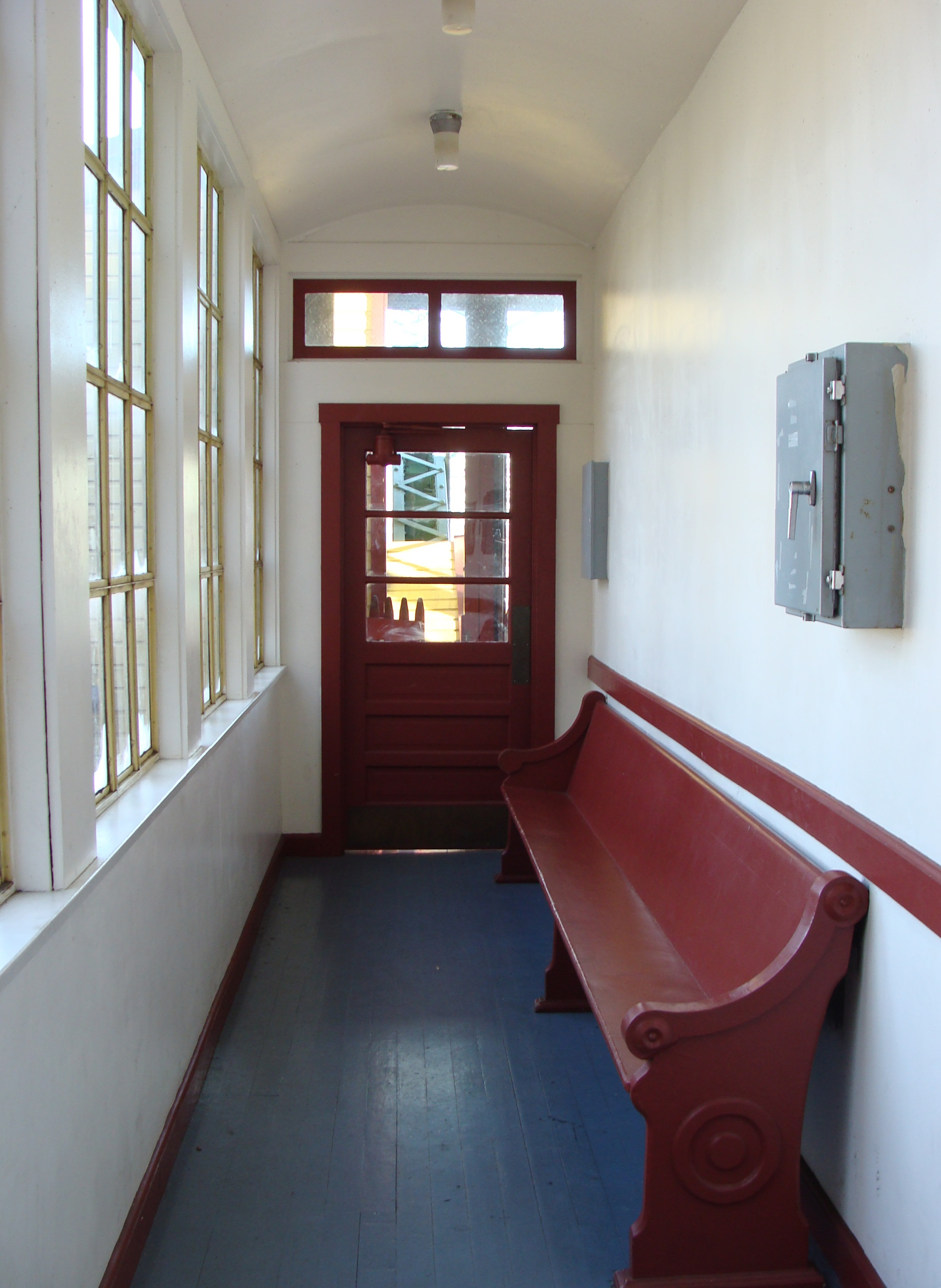
The enclosed passenger area, with bench

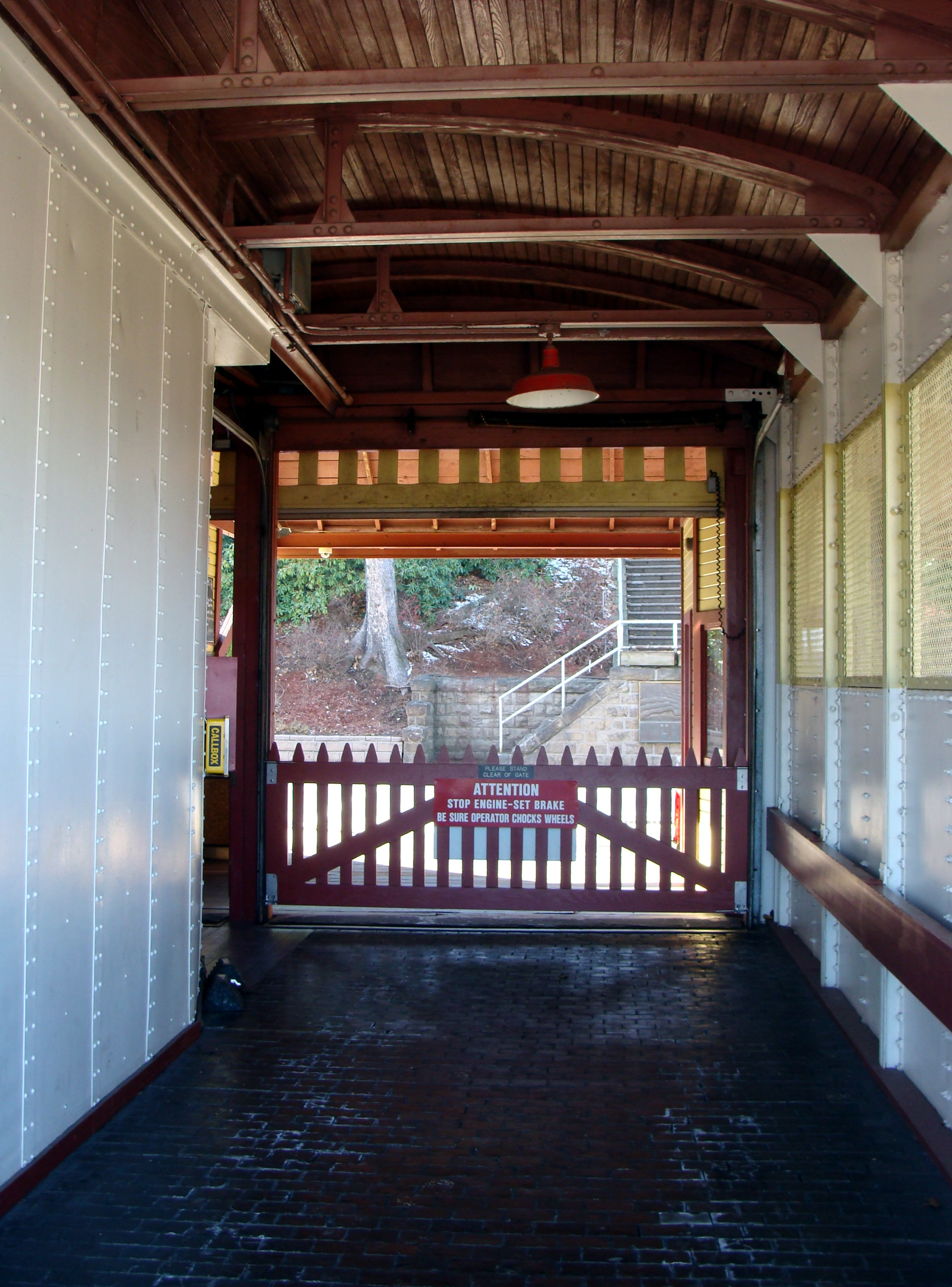
The main deck of the car, which is large enough to hold several motorcycles or an automobile.

== History ==
=== Background and construction ===
Inclines are common in Europe, and immigrants, such as the German, Slavic, and Welsh people who settled near Johnstown, remembered them from their native lands and brought the concept to the United States. The earliest inclines in the United States were a series of 10 that were built in the 1830s as part of the Allegheny Portage Railroad. The portage railroad carried canal boats over the Allegheny Mountains to connect the canals from Pittsburgh to the ones from Philadelphia. Pittsburgh at one time also had "at least 17" inclines, many of which carried both passengers and freight; two of these inclines (including the Nunnery Hill Incline) were curved.

On May 31, 1889, the South Fork Dam collapsed upstream of Johnstown on the Little Conemaugh River. The resulting deluge devastated the city, killing 2,209 people and destroying 1,600 houses in low-lying areas. As the city rebuilt, the Cambria Iron Company started work on a residential development atop Yoder Hill. To provide easy transportation on the steep slope for residents of the new community of Westmont, the company constructed an inclined plane. In addition to being a convenient mode of transportation, the Johnstown Inclined Plane doubled as an escape route in case Johnstown was flooded again.

Diescher was hired by Cambria Iron to design the incline. The rails used in the incline were manufactured in Johnstown at Cambria Iron, and many of the construction tools handcrafted there. The Inclined Plane Bridge was also built to connect the lower station with the rest of Johnstown. Originally named the Cambria Inclined Plane, the Johnstown Inclined Plane opened on June 1, 1891. It had cost $133,296 to build. The funicular was originally operated by the Cambria Inclined Plane Company, a subsidiary of Cambria Iron.

=== Cambria Iron ownership ===
The convenience the incline provided stimulated a rapid growth of population in Westmont and made the borough one of the country's first suburbs. Over 40 million trips were taken on the incline in its first 80 years of operation. When the incline was built, it used double-decker cars that were 12 feet (3.7 m) wide and 24 feet (7.3 m) long. The double-decker cars had horses and wagons riding on the main, upper deck and passengers riding in a compartment below. Originally, the incline used a compressed air system to reverse direction. In its heyday, the funicular operated 24 hours a day, and both cars ran continuously. Only one human fatality has occurred at the incline; it was determined that the incident was not caused by the incline itself. There were two incidents in the 1920s when horses aboard the incline became spooked and leapt from the car onto the tracks.

The incline's original steam engine was disconnected on January 6, 1912, and replaced with an electric motor. After receiving complaints about fares, Pennsylvania's Public Service Commission (PSC) mandated in 1915 that the Cambria Inclined Plane Company revise the fares for the route. The Johnstown Inclined Plane saw its highest-ever annual ridership in 1919, when the incline carried 1,356,393 pedestrians and 124,825 vehicles. Afterward, ridership steadily declined due to the increased popularity of vehicular transport. The double-decker cars were reconfigured into a single-decker design in 1921.

Ridership was one-third of 1919 levels by the 1930s, prompting the Cambria Inclined Plane Company to ask the PSC for permission to discontinue service in December 1930. The company claimed that the funicular was unprofitable, that the approach roads to the stations were in disrepair, and that vehicles could just use highways nearby, but local automobile owners and Johnstown's city council opposed the proposal to close the Cambria Incline to vehicles. The PSC ultimately declined the closure request in May 1931, mandating that the approach roads be repaired, though the Cambria Inclined Plane Company claimed that it would be impractical to repair the approach roads. The company again applied for permission to abandon the incline in December 1934.

=== Westmont government ownership ===
==== Mid-1930s to early 1960s ====
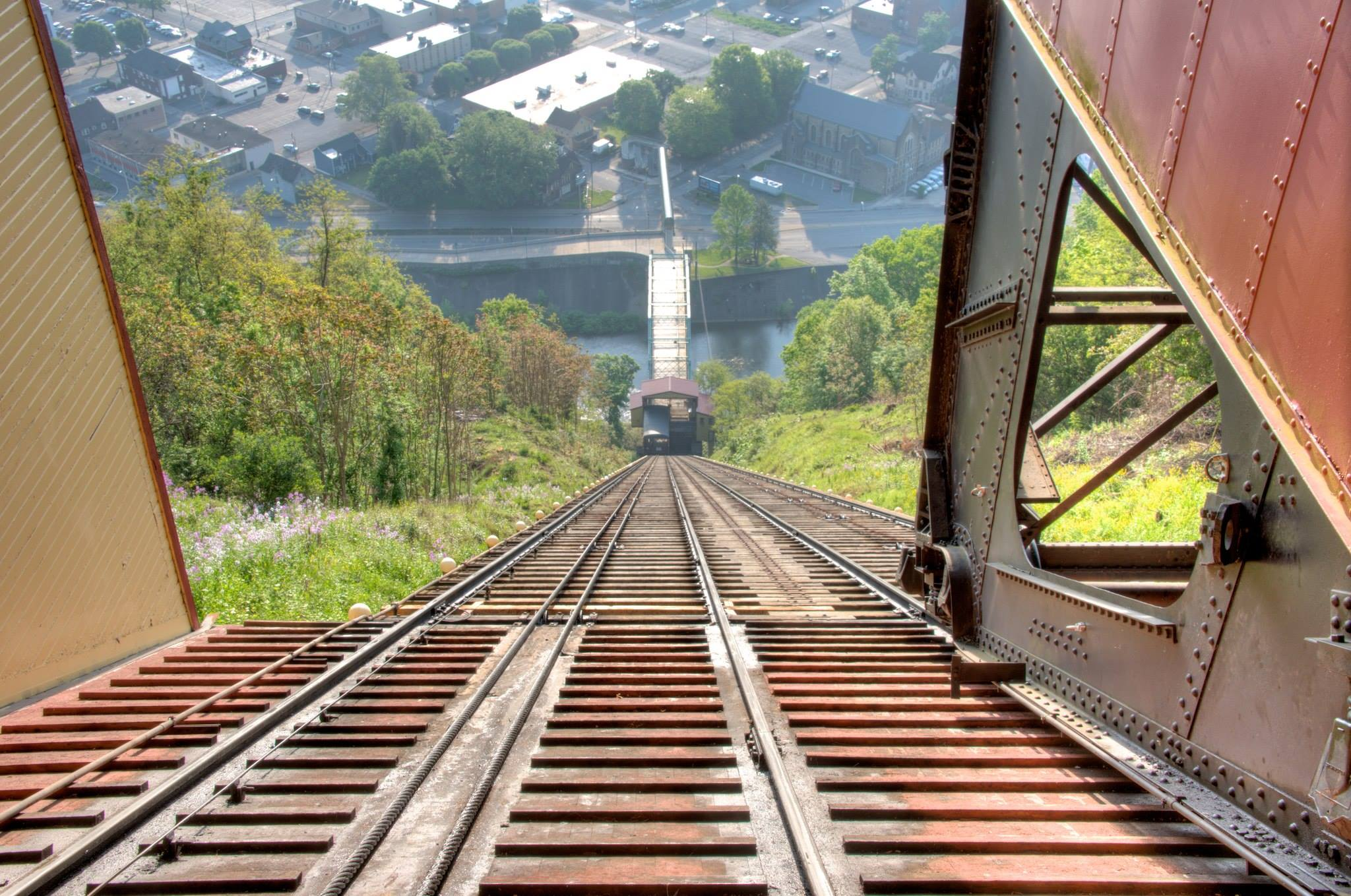
A view of the Johnstown Inclined Plane's tracks from the upper station

To avert the funicular's closure, Bethlehem Steel, the successor to Cambria Iron, proposed selling the Johnstown Inclined Plane to the Westmont borough government. A new law and two orders had to be enacted to allow the Westmont government to take over the Cambria Inclined Plane. The Pennsylvania General Assembly passed the first of these bills in February 1935, allowing Westmont to buy the Cambria Inclined Plane Company. The borough of Westmont finalized its purchase in April 1935 for a nominal fee of $1. That June, the General Assembly passed a second bill permitting Westmont to operate feeder bus services to the funicular's stations, and Governor George Howard Earle III signed the bill. In the year after it took over the incline's operation, Westmont earned $1,603 from the route.

During the Johnstown flood on March 17, 1936, nearly 4,000 people were evacuated from Johnstown to higher ground via the incline; afterward, rescue workers used the funicular to help with the flood-cleanup efforts. The Johnstown Incline also continued to serve as a mode of public transportation between the bottom and top of the hill. From February 1938 to July 1953, the Johnstown Traction Company operated transit buses from Johnstown to Westmont with the "fully loaded public buses" being carried by the incline. Newer buses were too large to fit on the incline's cars, leading to the discontinuation of the bus service on the incline. As a result, commuters had to transfer from local buses on either end of the incline.

Ridership on the incline increased again in the 1940s, when it accommodated 700,000 annual passengers, some of whom rode the funicular to avoid paying for gasoline during World War II. The construction of highways nearby in the 1950s prompted many of the incline's former riders to drive instead, and by 1957 the borough of Westmont was contemplating closing the incline. Though the Johnstown Incline remained open, was losing $25,000 a year by 1961. Around that time, volunteers renovated the Johnstown Inclined Plane to attract visitors; this work included painting the Inclined Plane Bridge near the lower station.

==== Cambria County Tourist Council takeover ====
Bethlehem Steel stopped supplying electricity to the Johnstown Inclined Plane when the factory switched to a system that could not be used on the incline. This forced the incline to close on January 31, 1962. The closure prompted the public to advocate for the incline's continued operation; as a result, the electric motor was rewound, ties were replaced, and the cars were repainted. The Cambria County Tourist Council was organized to raise money to operate the incline, with the goal of raising $10,200 before the end of February 1962, and it solicited donations from Pennsylvania residents. The Westmont government subsequently said that it did not want to demolish the incline but was also unwilling to sell or continue operating it. In April, the borough government agreed to lease the incline to the Cambria County Tourist Council.

The incline reopened on July 4, 1962, coinciding with Independence Day. Initially, the Cambria County Tourist Council paid a nominal fee of $10 annually. When the incline reopened, the cars did not run continuously; instead, they operated only after at least eight fare-paying passengers had gathered in each car. One observer wrote that, although it was theoretically possible to drive between Westmont and Johnstown, it "is much more fun and certainly more direct" to ride the incline instead.

During the early 1970s, the Pennsylvania Turnpike Planning and Development Commission authorized the construction of a diorama depicting the Johnstown Inclined Plane. By then, the funicular was primarily used as a tourist attraction, recording an average of 80,000 annual passengers. The safety cable was replaced in the mid-1970s with wires from Bethlehem Steel's plant. On July 20, 1977, during that year's Johnstown flood, the incline was again used as an escape route, evacuating 1,500 residents from the valley to Westmont. Afterward, the incline carried rescue equipment and emergency personnel into the valley; tourists also gathered at the upper station to survey the damage, hampering the cleanup efforts.

=== CamTran ownership ===
==== 1980s and 1990s ====
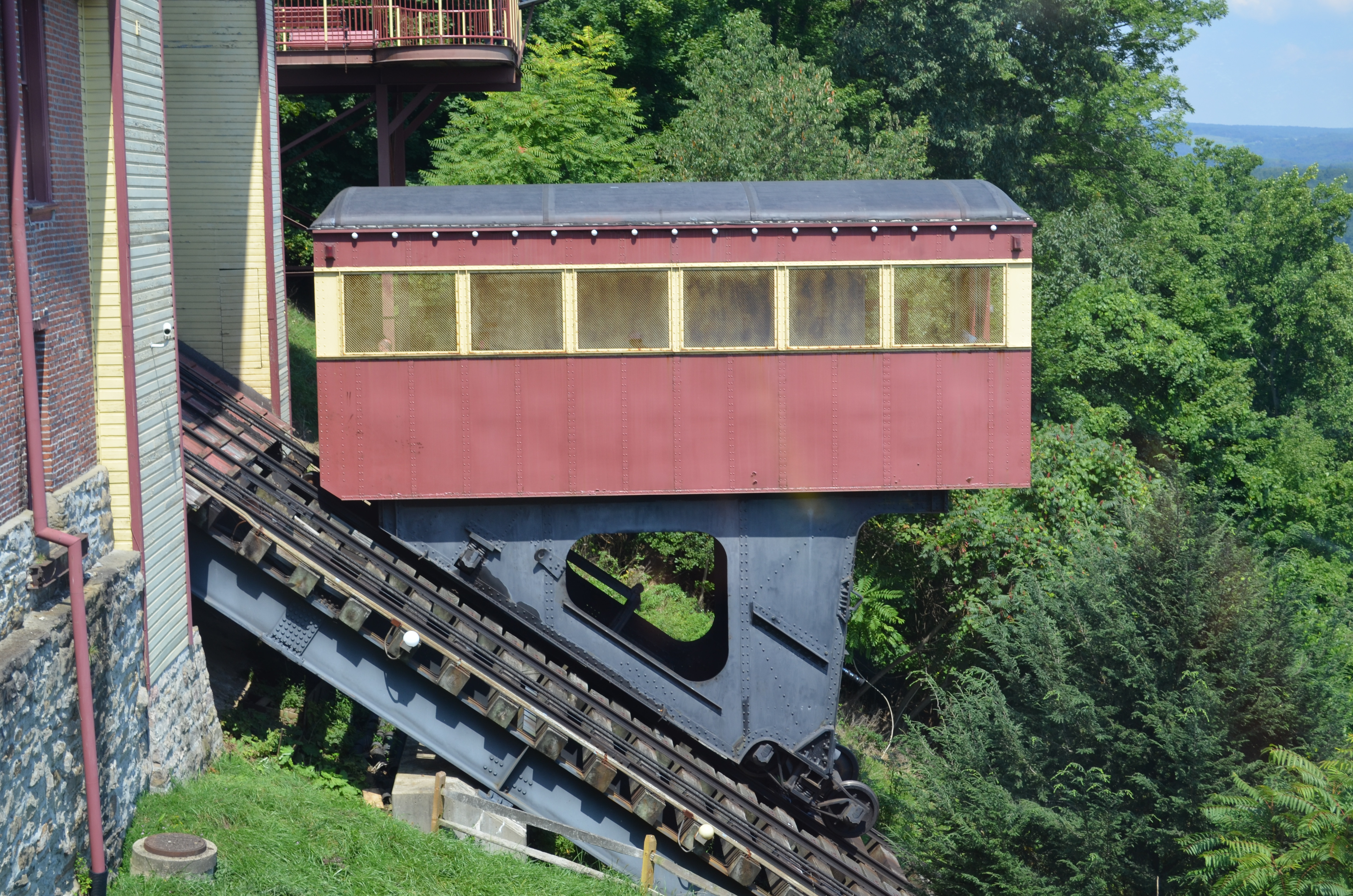
Side view

By July 1982, there were plans to renovate the Johnstown Incline, and the Cambria County Tourist Council sought money from the federal and state governments to fund the renovation. The incline had to be sold to the Cambria County Transit Authority (now CamTran) to become eligible for government funding. The route closed for repairs in January 1983, at which point the renovation was planned to cost $1.7 million. The federal government funded 80% of the renovation, while the local government provided the remainder; in addition, local businessmen W. E. and Rudolph Schoneck agreed to finance 3.5% of the renovation's cost. The government of Westmont subsequently agreed to sell the incline to the Cambria County Transit Authority for a nominal fee of $1. The sale was finalized on March 8, 1983.

The renovations were completed on August 22, 1984, and the incline was rededicated on September 6. Sources disagree on whether the project cost $3.2 million or $3.5 million. The Pittsburgh Press wrote at the time: "For Johnstown, the incline has, in more ways than one, provided a lift." By then, the incline was locally known as the "Heavenly Hoist" and was one of three remaining passenger inclines in Pennsylvania, along with the Duquesne Incline and Monongahela Incline in Pittsburgh. The Johnstown Incline carried about 80,000 people per year (including about 100 daily commuters) after it reopened, though it primarily functioned as a tourist attraction and was losing money. Due to the high cost of operating the funicular, CamTran leased it to the Cambria County Tourist Council, though the federal government continued to give CamTran about $538,000 annually to operate the funicular.

In advance of the Johnstown Flood's 100th anniversary, in the late 1980s, the Johnstown Incline received about $1.6 million or $1.9 million for further renovations. This funding would be used to construct a visitor center next to the upper station, which was to include a restaurant and bar, meeting room, theater, and presentation room. The visitor center was supposed to be completed in July 1988, but it was still unfinished when Johnstown began commemorating the flood's centennial in mid-1989. A reporter for the Los Angeles Times wrote the same year that the incline carried at least 30 vehicles a day. The visitor center had opened by 1991. The original restaurant closed and was replaced by another restaurant in the 1990s. A footbridge spanning Pennsylvania Route 56 between the incline's lower station and Vine Street was opened around 1994. By then, The Globe and Mail reported that the incline often went several days without carrying any vehicles. By late 1995, there were plans to close the Johnstown Incline temporarily so the Inclined Plane Bridge could be rebuilt. The closure was postponed because officials could not find the necessary parts for the repairs; the incline was shuttered for repairs during two weeks in early 1998.

==== 2000s and 2010s ====
In early 2000, the Pennsylvania Department of Transportation (PennDOT) commenced a $2.9 million renovation of the Incline Plane Bridge next to the lower station, and a shuttle bus began running between the lower and upper stations. The incline remained open for round-trip journeys from the upper station, and the restaurant and visitor center continued to operate; at the time, the incline carried 120,000 annual riders. The bridge reopened in 2001, but its beams were of the wrong size, which forced PennDOT to close it for repairs. By then, the incline was in danger of closing permanently due to a funding shortfall, since visitors erroneously thought that it had stopped running during the bridge's closure. The route's closure was averted after officials launched a promotional campaign, created an endowment fund, and rescheduled the repairs so they took place outside the busy summertime season. The bridge closed in September 2001 to allow PennDOT to finish repairing the deck; the restaurant in the visitor center closed permanently due to the resulting reduction in traffic. The bridge reopened on December 14.

In the two years after the incline's reopening in 2001, annual ridership declined by 40%, in part due to the closure of the restaurant. As a result, the funicular was closed on weekdays for two months in 2003, and it was also closed during the winters starting in 2002–2003. The Johnstown Incline's operators offered discounts to residents of Cambria County to encourage local visitation. Andy Lasky proposed reopening the restaurant in the Johnstown Incline's visitor center in 2003; the plans faced opposition because they entailed removing part of the neighboring hillside and expanding the visitor center's parking lot. A judge ultimately approved Lasky's petition to allow the parking lot to be expanded, but the parking-lot project was deferred due to a lack of funding. Lasky formally leased the restaurant space in 2004.

The Johnstown Inclined Plane was closed from September 9 to October 14, 2010, for the installation of a new 9,000-pound (4,100 kg) "hoist brake shaft". From October 29 to 31, 2012, CamTran shut down the incline fearing power outages during Hurricane Sandy. The Asiago's restaurant moved into the visitor center's restaurant space in 2013. Two resistors failed and stopped the incline near the stations on June 28, 2014; repairs took approximately a month after consultants diagnosed the failure. Sensor issues briefly disrupted service in August 2014 and again in December 2014, forcing the incline to start its winter maintenance period early. In addition, the firm NexGen was hired in 2015 to refurbish the incline's cars for $3.7 million. By 2017, local residents were advocating for a $10 million renovation of the Johnstown Incline, partially financed by Act 44 funds from the Pennsylvania Turnpike Commission (PTC). The design process was 60% completed by 2019, when a dispute between PennDOT and the PTC arose over whether the project was eligible for Act 44 funds.

==== 2020s refurbishment ====
Two cars traversing the slope

In 2021, the incline closed for a renovation, which was expected to cost more than $12 million; the visitor center and Asiago's restaurant remained open during the project. The refurbishment included restoration of the cars, a complete overhaul of the mechanical and electrical systems, and replacement of all the track ties. The project was funded by a variety of state and federal funds, including part of a $24 million federal grant from the Rebuilding American Infrastructure with Sustainability and Equity program. Donations from local foundations also covered some of the restoration cost. By July 2022, the incline's ties had been replaced, a drainage system had been added, and vegetation had been planted around the incline.

Though the project was supposed to be completed in early 2023, the renovation stalled after work was 92 percent complete. Local TV station WJAC-TV reported in May 2023 that the incline's reopening had been delayed due to issues in completing and delivering the sheave wheels, to which the cables are attached. After further issues arose, CamTran halted the renovation in January 2024. The sheave wheels had been delivered but needed to be remade; officials had also discovered damage to one of the cables, and the incline needed to be inspected and recertified before it could reopen. The same month, CamTran began soliciting bids for the replacement of a footbridge at the bottom of the incline. In May 2024, CamTran awarded three contracts for the renovation of the incline's visitor center, its observation deck, and the footbridge. Due to the continued delays, CamTran declined to review bids for replacement cables that September, as the cables were not ready to be installed.

Work resumed in December 2024 after CamTran finished investigating the cable damage. By March 2025, CamTran wanted to reopen the Johnstown Incline by the end of the year, and the replacement sheave wheels were installed that April. By that July, workers had conducted successful test runs of the funicular cars and were adding sensors. CamTram was hiring staff for the incline by September 2025, and the Pennsylvania government inspected the incline the next month. The incline's reopening was subsequently delayed again to early 2026 due to brake issues; the brake system had been repaired by February 2026. The incline passed a state inspection that May and completed a 30-day testing phase in July. The Johnstown Inclined Plane reopened on September 10, 2026, with free rides for 30 days.

== Current operations ==
Historical ridership
Year	Pass.	±%
1996	142,109	—
1997	120,156	−15.4%
1998	118,802	−1.1%
1999	120,456	+1.4%
2000	121,779	+1.1%
2001	66,620	−45.3%
2002	74,485	+11.8%
2003	72,431	−2.8%
2004	65,685	−9.3%
2005	86,031	+31.0%
2006	109,222	+27.0%
2007	104,238	−4.6%
2008	100,653	−3.4%
2009	102,516	+1.9%
2010	92,185	−10.1%
2011	81,236	−11.9%
2012	94,934	+16.9%
2013	86,984	−8.4%
2014	70,761	−18.7%
2015	43,670	−38.3%
2016	65,268	+49.5%
2017	63,764	−2.3%
2018	51,481	−19.3%
2019	65,804	+27.8%
2020	40,835	−37.9%
2021	20,193	−50.5%
Source: National Transit Database, Federal Transit Administration; The incline had no passengers during 2022–2025 due to reconstruction.

Since the 1980s, the incline has become one of the main tourist attractions in Johnstown, with people visiting the incline to "ride for fun, nostalgia and novelty." In 2021 (prior to its temporary closure), the Johnstown Inclined Plane had an annual ridership of 20,193 passengers, a decrease of 50.5 percent from the previous year. Primarily used for tourism, the incline's use by commuters, who bike or walk to work, has also increased. CamTran's Route 18 transit bus offers connections between the incline and downtown Johnstown. As of 2026, the cost for a ride on the incline is $3 one way (or $5 for a round trip), while the one-way fare for automobiles is $8. The incline takes around 90 seconds to travel between stations; the same trip takes 10 minutes by automobile. There are parking lots next to both stations. When in regular operation, the incline is inspected daily before it opens to the public.

The upper station has a gift shop selling souvenirs and snacks. Adjacent to the station is a visitor center made of glass and brick. The mechanical room housing the incline's hoisting mechanism is visible from the gift shop and the visitor center. The visitor center has a restaurant, telescopes, and displays about Johnstown's floods, in addition to dioramas of Johnstown inside. An observation deck providing views of the incline, the city, and the valley is located on the opposite side of the station from the visitor center. There is also a 30-by-60-foot (9.1 by 18.3 m) American flag outside the visitor center. Since the 1970s, the upper station of the Johnstown Incline has also led to a series of multipurpose trails. One of these trails is a sculpture trail with eight works by local artist James Wolfe, who made the sculptures in 1989 using remnants of the Bethlehem Steel factory in Johnstown.

Next to the lower station, the Inclined Plane Bridge spans the Stoneycreek River, providing access to the rest of Johnstown. This bridge is variously cited as measuring 225 feet (69 m) or 237 feet (72 m) long. The bridge connects to Pennsylvania Routes 56 and 403. The Johnstown Flood Museum is about three blocks away from the lower station.

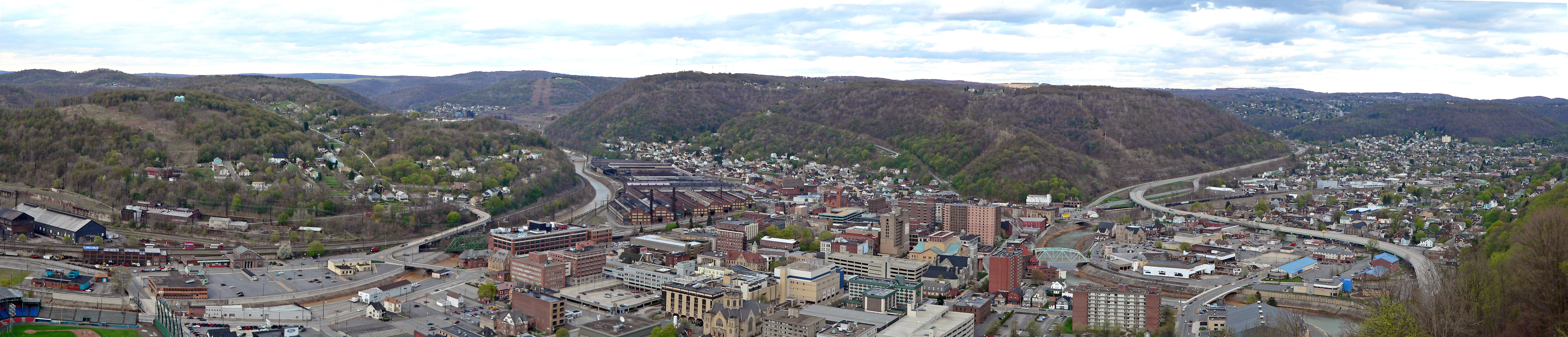
Panorama from the observation deck at the top of the incline. The Little Conemaugh River (center-left) and the Stonycreek River (right) combine in Johnstown to form the Conemaugh River.

== Recognition and landmark designations ==
The incline has been featured on media such as a commemorative coin memorializing the 1889 Johnstown Flood and a postal cancellation issued in 1979. The Cambria County Tourist Council published a book about the incline in 1985. In addition, the Johnstown Inclined Plane was listed on the National Register of Historic Places on June 18, 1973, and it was designated an Historic Mechanical Engineering Landmark by the American Society of Mechanical Engineers (ASME) in September 1994.

== See also ==
- List of funicular railways
- List of Historic Mechanical Engineering Landmarks
- National Register of Historic Places listings in Cambria County, Pennsylvania
