= Johnstown flood of 1936 =

Natural disaster in Pennsylvania

- Date: March 17, 1936 to March 18, 1936
- Location: Johnstown, Pennsylvania area
- Deaths: 25
- Property damage: US$43 million

The Johnstown flood of 1936, also collectively with other areas referred to as the Saint Patrick's Day Flood, was a devastating flood in Cambria County, and Johnstown, Pennsylvania proper, referred to as "Greater Johnstown".

The flood was preceded by heavy rains beginning March 9, 1936, which did not stop until March 22. The storms brought warmer weather with temperatures of 50 °F (10 °C) and was a cause of one stage of the flooding; the continuous rainfall was the second cause. The natural surface runoff of 1 to 3 inches (2.5 to 7.5 cm) was far surpassed by the deluge of from 10 to 30 inches (25 to 75 cm) of water in the region.

The flood came before pending flood control legislation was enacted or any significant flood control measures were implemented. The narrowness of the valleys and the encroachment of buildings on riverbanks contributed to the record flooding. By the time nightfall on March 17, one-third of the city was under 17 feet (5.2 m) of water. Twenty-five people lost their lives in the disaster, and damages estimated at $43 million made it the worst flood since the flood of 1889. The event is chronicled at the Johnstown Flood Museum.

After the flood, sweeping nationwide flood control laws were enacted and from 1938 to 1943 Johnstown saw many projects completed. These measures gave residents the feeling that the area was now "flood free", and it was touted as such until the flood of 1977.

== History ==
On June 7, 1906, Johnstown experienced major flooding that reached 17 feet (5.2 m) on the Franklin street bridge. On March 14, 1907, there was flooding that was bested only by the one in 1889. There was talk of flood control but nothing was accomplished. Talks had finally determined that something needed to be done and the legislature was working on a bill by 1935.

On March 15 and 16, 1936, heavy rains hit the Johnstown area. Warmer weather began to melt the accumulated snow on the ground, and the soil became saturated. By March 17, the Conemaugh River reached flood stage and was continuing to rise at the rate of 18 inches per hour. The raging streams merged and entered Johnstown. At Locust Street and Lee Place, the flood crest reached to within five feet of the high-water mark of the catastrophic flood of May 31, 1889. In the section known as Cambria City, the stone bridge, unlike in 1889, remained unobstructed, resulting in a flood level here that was 18 inches higher than that of the 1889 flood.

On March 18, whistles and sirens began to scream, as word spread that the Quemahoning Reservoir dam had broken. People rushed for higher ground. This report turned out to be false and people started making their way back into town. Robert Bondy, the American Red Cross national director of disaster relief arrived to start relief efforts. The Works Progress Administration sent 7000 men and 350 to report to Mayor Shields. 1724 enlisted and 114 officers were mobilized by Governor George H. Earle effectively placing the area under martial law. 80 members of the Highway Patrol and 81 members of the State Police arrived to help restore and maintain order. The gauge on the Poplar Street Bridge showed 15 feet above flood level and the 14 feet above flood stage at the "Point".

=== Inclined bridge and plane ===
As the flood was rising people crossed the Inclined Plane Bridge and were ferried to the Westmont hilltop by the funicular inclined plane, that only stopped when the flood waters rose too high for it to continue operating.

== Causes ==
In early March 1936, a storm front moved into Pennsylvania bringing 50 degree Fahrenheit (10 degree Celsius) weather which was very high for so early in the season. The warm front was enough to melt accumulated snow in the mountains. Those temperatures were accompanied by three days of severe rains, which saturated the land and caused swift run-off into local streams and rivers upstream from Johnstown.

The natural run-off of 1 to 3 inches (2.5 to 7.5 cm) was far surpassed by the deluge of from 10 to 30 inches (25 to 75 cm) of water in the region. Other areas affected by the same storm system included Connecticut River at Hartford, Connecticut, was 8.6 feet higher than recorded in 300 years, the Susquehanna River at Harrisburg, was 3.5 feet higher than seen in 200 years, and the Ohio River at Pittsburgh was 6.1 feet higher than the previous highest level recorded in 1762. Flooding was widespread.

== Tax to fund recovery ==
In 1936, a statewide temporary 10% tax on alcohol was created to assist with the city's recovery from the flood.

By 1942, the tax had contributed $42 million to recovery costs. In 1951, the tax was made permanent, becoming the state liquor tax, with funds no longer earmarked for costs related to the flood. In the following years, the tax was raised twice to 18%.

== Aftermath ==
Flood control measures had been introduced, but had bogged down in legislative debates. The Johnstown flood of March, 1936 came before anything significant had been accomplished. The 1936 Johnstown flood was the seminal event that gave modern federal flood control measures in the United States their impetus. 15,000 letters were sent to President Franklin Delano Roosevelt asking for help. The Johnstown Tribune and Democrat (which later merged with The Tribune-Democrat) demanded federal aid. Senators and Representatives in Washington, D.C. enacted the Flood Control Act of 1936 and the Flood Control Act of 1937. In August, 1938 work began on the most extensive flood control channel improvement project in American history. In Johnstown, the U.S. Army Corps of Engineers constructed 6,500 feet of river walls and 3,000 feet of dykes. On November 27, 1943, Colonel Gilbert Van B. Wilkes, Chief of the US Army Corps of Engineers, Pittsburgh District reported to Johnstown leaders that the flood problem had been effectively solved. Johnstown began to promote the city as "Flood Free".

== See also ==
- Pittsburgh flood of 1936
