= Inclined Plane Bridge =

Bridge in Johnstown, Pennsylvania

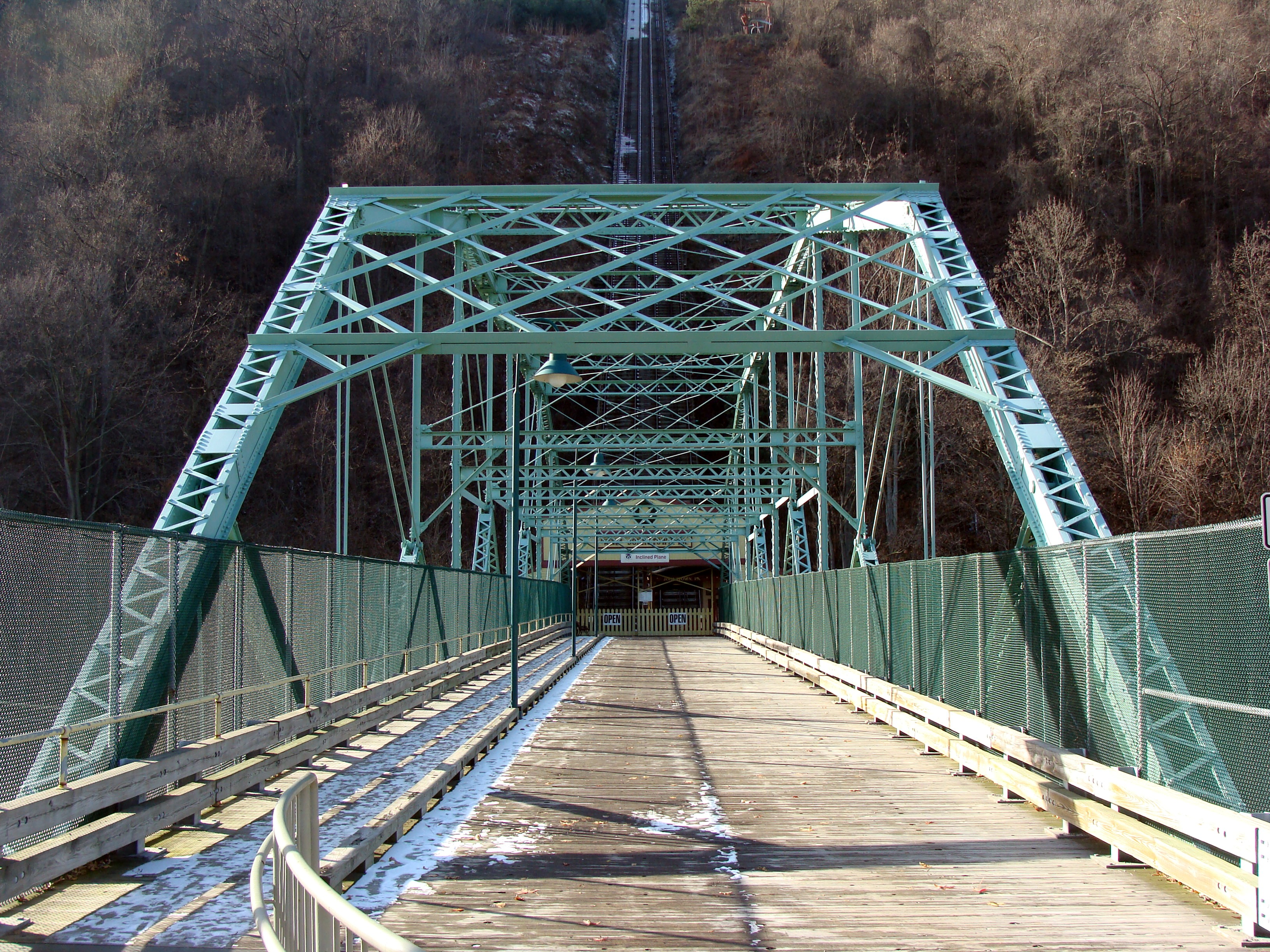
- Coordinates: 40°19′33″N 78°55′33″W
- Carries: SR 3022 spur
- Crosses: Stonycreek River
- Locale: Cambria, Pennsylvania, United States
- Other name: Bridge in Johnstown City
- Maintained by: PennDOT
- NBI #: 113022001000000

Characteristics
- Total length: 72.2 m (237 ft)
- Width: 5.7 m (19 ft)
- Load limit: 5 short tons (4.5 t)

History
- Constructed by: Sparks and Evans
- Built: June 1, 1891
- Inclined Plane Bridge
- U.S. National Register of Historic Places
- MPS: Highway Bridges Owned by the Commonwealth of Pennsylvania, Department of Transportation TR
- NRHP reference No.: 88000805
- Added to NRHP: June 22, 1988

Location
- Interactive map of Inclined Plane Bridge

The Inclined Plane Bridge is a 237-foot-long (72 m) Pennsylvania through truss bridge that spans Stonycreek River in Johnstown, Pennsylvania, United States. It connects the city to the lower station of the Johnstown Inclined Plane. The bridge was listed on the National Register of Historic Places in 1988 and was documented by the Historic American Engineering Record (HAER) in 1997.

== History ==
On May 31, 1889, the South Fork Dam on the Little Conemaugh River, upstream of Johnstown, collapsed. The resulting deluge devastated the city, killing over 2,000 people. As the city rebuilt, the Cambria Iron Company started work on a residential development atop Yoder Hill, overlooking the city. To provide easy transportation across the steep slope for the residents of the new community of Westmont, as well as to function as an escape route for future floods, the company opted to construct the Johnstown Inclined Plane, a funicular. A bridge had to be built to connect Johnstown to the lower station of the incline, on the opposite side of Stonycreek River as the city.

Work started on the bridge on June 11, 1890, with excavation of the bridge's abutments finished a week later. By March 20, 1891, only the approach to the bridge remained to be completed. The bridge, officially, was opened on June 1, 1891, at the same time as the incline. On March 17, 1936, nearly 4,000 people crowded on the approach, the bridge, and numerous boats to escape to higher ground via the incline as Stonycreek and Conemaugh Rivers overflowed their banks. The floodwaters continued downstream and eventually reached Pittsburgh.

The Works Progress Administration appropriated $17,812 in October 1936 to repair the bridge's approach and replace stringers, handrails and the road deck. The Pennsylvania Department of Highways, the predecessor to the Pennsylvania Department of Transportation (PennDOT), acquired the bridge in 1964. It was listed on the National Register of Historic Places on June 22, 1988. On September 1, 2000, PennDOT undertook a $2.3 million renovation of the bridge and the access road leading to it. Work was suspended from April to September 2001, to allow operation of the incline. The renovations were completed on December 14, 2001, after PennDOT finished repairs to the bridge deck.

== Design ==
The Inclined Plane Bridge was made from wrought iron and steel riveted together to form a Pennsylvania truss. The Pennsylvania, or Petit, truss is "essentially a Pratt truss" with the outermost horizontal girders being "polygonal" and having "subdivided panels" to "stiffen the truss under heavy loads." At 237 feet (72 m) long, the Inclined Plane Bridge is relatively short for a Pennsylvania truss; bridges of this sort are generally 250 to 600 feet (76 to 183 m) long.

== See also ==
- List of bridges on the National Register of Historic Places in Pennsylvania
- List of bridges documented by the Historic American Engineering Record in Pennsylvania
- National Register of Historic Places listings in Cambria County, Pennsylvania

== Sources ==
- Gruen, J. Philip (1997). "Inclined Plane Bridge". Historic American Engineering Record. National Park Service. HAER PA-454.
- Springirth, Kenneth C (2006). Johnstown Trolleys and Incline. Images of Rail. Charleston, South Carolina: Arcadia. ISBN 0-7385-4583-X.
