= Cambria and Indiana Railroad =

American transport company

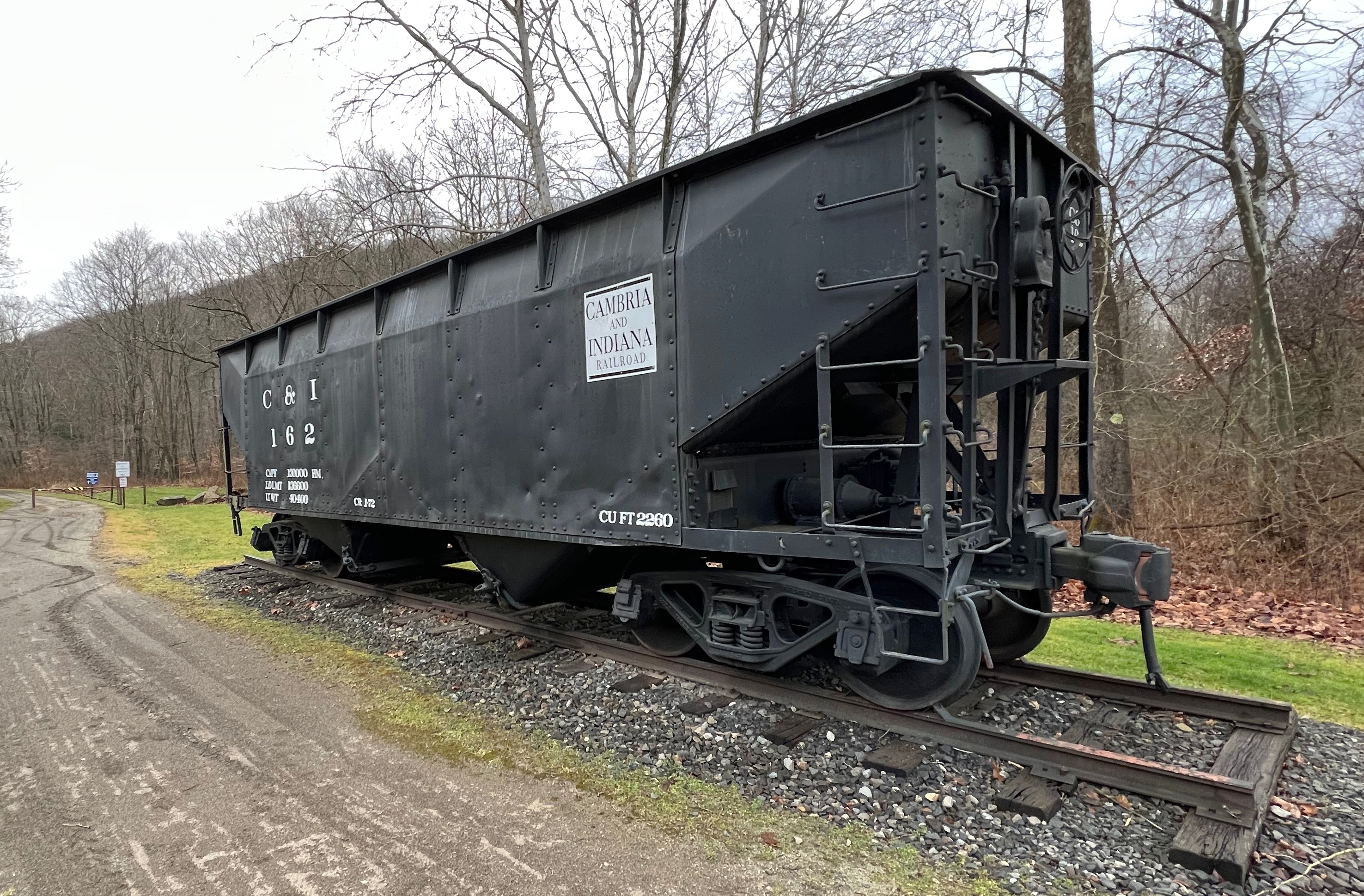
- Coal hopper located Ghost Town Trail, a rail trail in Indiana County, Pennsylvania

Overview
- Headquarters: Colver, Pennsylvania
- Reporting mark: CI
- Locale: Cambria and Indiana County, Pennsylvania
- Dates of operation: 1904–1995
- Successor: None

Technical
- Track gauge: 4 ft 8 1/2 in (1,435 mm) standard gauge
- Length: 57 miles (92 km)

The Cambria and Indiana Railroad (C&I) (reporting mark CI) is a railway company that is located in the southeastern part of Indiana County, Pennsylvania in the United States. Incorporated in 1904 and built in 1910 with the intention of carrying lumber, coal was discovered in the area soon after its construction, and C&I's fortunes subsequently became closely intertwined with the coal industry.

C&I became the "richest railroad in the country", generating the most revenue per mile of track, during the 1930s and 1940s. The increasing use of electricity for heating purposes, however, dealt a severe blow to C&I and in 1995, C&I divested almost all its assets.

== Brief history ==
The Cambria and Indiana Railroad, originally named Blacklick and Yellow Creek Railroad (B&YC), was founded in 1904 by Vinton Lumber Company as a subsidiary company to haul its lumber. Soon after its construction, coal was found in the area and the subsidiary was subsequently purchased by John Heisley Weaver and B. Dawson Coleman for US$100,000 in 1910 to serve its coal interests in the Cambria and Indiana counties.

At the time of purchase, the B&YC was only ten miles long but the railroad was extensively extended soon after its acquisition to better serve its new purpose. Construction began in February, 1911 and the name of the company was officially changed on 20 April 1911 to reflect the name of the two counties that it served. By 1919, C&I was also serving 23 other mines in the area. Scheduled passenger service started in 1914 until 1 December 1931, after which, it only ran only when needed until the late 1930s.

The first locomotive on the C&I was a Baldwin Steam Locomotive #3 which was subsequently sold in January 1930. The C&I became the "richest railroad in the country", generating the most revenue per mile of track, during the 1930s and 1940s. All this, however, was to change as a result of the declining use of coal for heating homes in preference for electricity. By 1962, there were only four mines left on the line, spelling the apparent demise of the C&I.

Bethlehem Steel became the majority owner of the railway in 1950. Business picked up when the BethEnergy subsidiary, opened Mine 33 near Ebensburg in 1963, and Barnes & Tucker opened a large mine at Stiles in 1965, thus sustaining C&I for another thirty years. However, in the summer of 1994, Bethlehem closed down Mine 33, spelling the apparent demise of the C&I. A year later, C&I sold almost all its trackage as scrap and donated most of its abandoned right-of-way to the Cambria County Conservation and Recreation Authority to become part of the Ghost Town Trail for use by bicyclists and walkers. C&I locomotives were dispatched to other Bethlehem subsidiary railroads. A small portion of trackage was retained by Conrail and another portion was sold to a private owner. In 1998, the private owner sold 9.6 miles of the abandoned track back to the C&I. Bethlehem Steel was acquired by ISG in 2003.

In 2004, nearly 10 years following the closing of Mine 33 and the end of C&I operations, ISG reported plans to reopen Mine 33 to produce coke primarily for steel-making by 2006, and also to generate electricity. This development was shelved in late 2006 due to economic conditions.

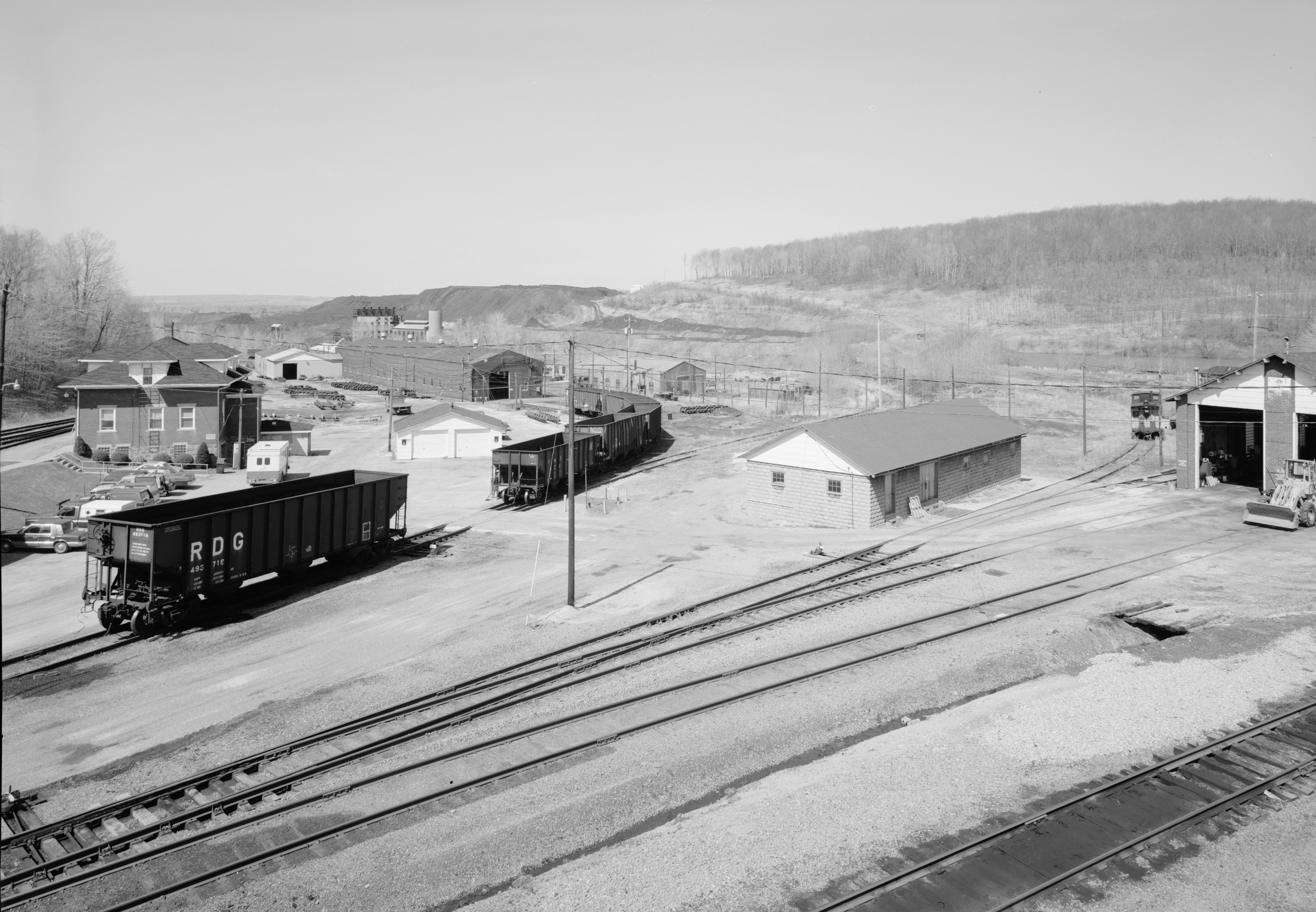
Cambria and Indiana Railroad Yard Colver Mine

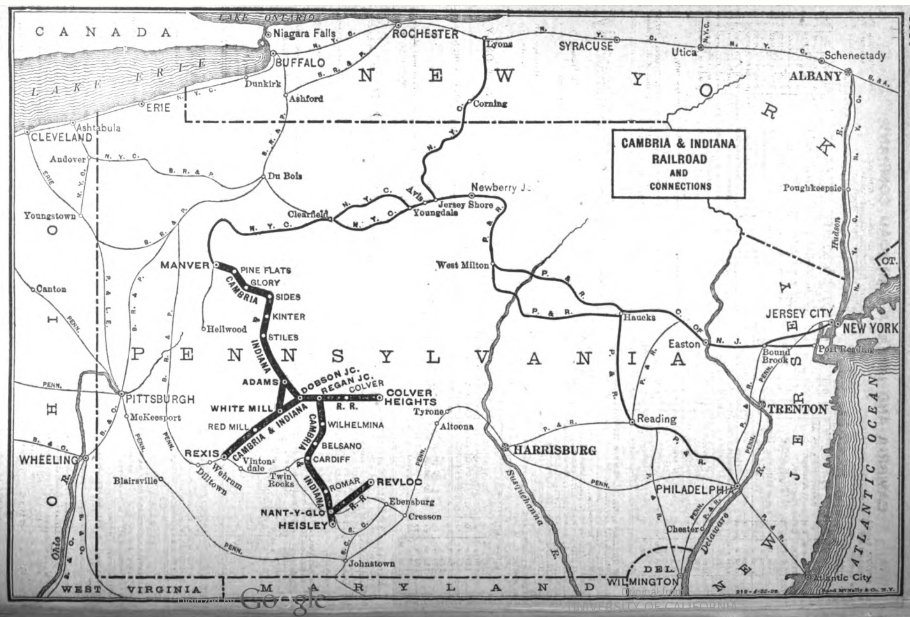
1923 Map (distorted scale)

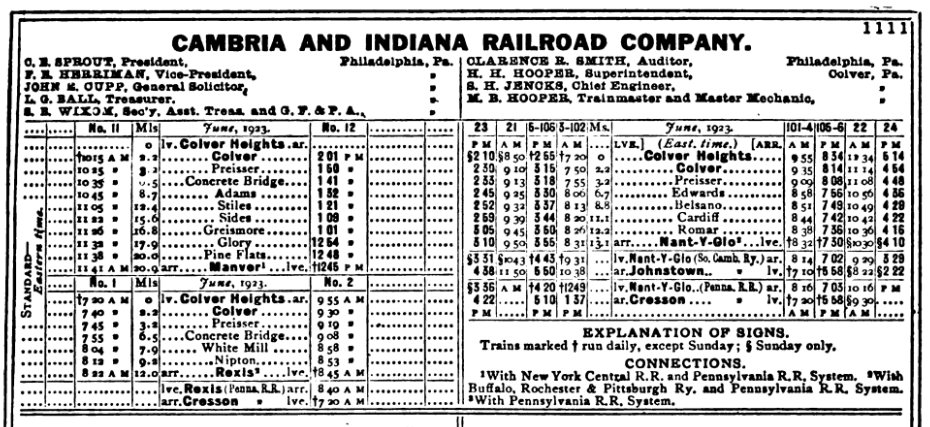
1923 Timetable

== See also ==
- Colver Historic District
- Revloc Historic District
