= Revloc, Pennsylvania =

Unincorporated community in Pennsylvania, US

- Census-designated place
- Location within the state of Pennsylvania Revloc (the United States)
- Coordinates: 40°29′29″N 78°45′52″W
- Country: United States
- State: Pennsylvania
- County: Cambria
- Township: Cambria

Area
  - Total: 0.34 sq mi (0.89 km^{2})
  - Land: 0.34 sq mi (0.89 km^{2})
  - Water: 0 sq mi (0.00 km^{2})
- Elevation: 2,060 ft (630 m)

Population (2020)
  - Total: 531
  - Density: 1,545.1/sq mi (596.55/km^{2})
- Time zone: UTC-5 (Eastern (EST))
  - Summer (DST): UTC-4 (EDT)
- ZIP code: 15948
- FIPS code: 42-64288
- GNIS feature ID: 1184954

Revloc is an unincorporated community and census-designated place in Cambria Township, Cambria County, Pennsylvania, United States. It is located near the intersections of US Routes 422 and 219, and is approximately 2 miles (3 km) west of the borough of Ebensburg, the Cambria County seat. As of the 2010 census, the population of Revloc was 570.

"Revloc" is the reverse-spelling of neighboring community Colver.

== Demographics ==
Historical population
Census	Pop.	Note	%±
2020	531		—
U.S. Decennial Census

== History ==
The Revloc mine, located south of the community, was originally constructed by the Monroe Coal Company (also known as the Coleman & Weaver Company) in 1916–1917. These mines later fell under the authority of Bethlehem Mining (BethEnergy), which operated them until the 1980s. In 1978, the Beaver County Times announced plans to reopen the mines after more than one year of closure, following a fire that resulted in over $10 million in losses. The original structures of the Revloc mines are still in existence, including a boiler house, an office building, and a red brick 1940s-era bathhouse.

The community of Revloc was founded in 1917 as a coal patch town to house the workers of the mines. The community was home to a notable amount of Eastern European immigrants, including those from Ukraine and Poland.

== Education ==
It is in the Central Cambria School District.

== See also ==
- List of geographic names derived from anagrams and ananyms
