= List of Pennsylvania state historical markers in Cambria County =

Location of Cambria County in Pennsylvania

This is a list of the Pennsylvania state historical markers in Cambria County.

This is intended to be a complete list of the official state historical markers placed in Cambria County, Pennsylvania by the Pennsylvania Historical and Museum Commission (PHMC). The locations of the historical markers, as well as the latitude and longitude coordinates as provided by the PHMC's database, are included below when available. There are 26 historical markers located in Cambria County.

== Historical markers ==
| Marker title | Image | Date dedicated | Location | Marker type | Topics |
| Admiral Peary Park | | 1948 | At site on SR 1005 just N of junction with SR 2014 W of Cresson | Roadside | Military, Military Post-Civil War, Professions & Vocations |
| Allegheny Portage Railroad | | September 11, 1994 | Intersection of Rts. 53 & 164, Portage Twp. | Roadside | Railroads, Transportation |
| Cambria City | | September 1, 1994 | 418 Broad St., Johnstown; 40.3397°N 78.9288°W | City | Cities & Towns, Coal, Ethnic & Immigration, Labor, Religion, Steel |
| Cambria County | | May 25, 1982 | County Courthouse, Center St., Ebensburg; 40.5257°N 78.7249°W | City | Government & Politics, Government & Politics 19th Century |
| Charles M. Schwab | | August 18, 1947 | SR 1001 at Loretto; 40.50859°N 78.63629°W | Roadside | Business & Industry, Education, Professions & Vocations, Steel |
| Clara Barton (1821-1912) | | July 1, 1994 | 662 Main St., Johnstown | City | Medicine & Science, Professions & Vocations, Women |
| Demetrius Gallitzin | | August 19, 1947 | SR 1005 (former LR 276), Loretto; 40.5021°N 78.6309°W | Roadside | Early Settlement, Ethnic & Immigration, Religion |
| Dr. Lawrence F. Flick | | May 11, 1959 | U.S. 219, 1 mile S of Carrolltown | Roadside | Medicine & Science, Professions & Vocations |
| First Cambria AME Zion Church | | May 10, 1997 | 409 Haynes Street, Johnstown; 40.32°N 78.9213°W | City | African American, Religion |
| First Steel | | March 4, 1947 | Pa. 56 in Johnstown, opposite steel mill (Missing) | Roadside | Business & Industry, Invention, Steel |
| First Steel Rails | | August 18, 1947 | Opposite steel mill (old Pa. 56), Johnstown | Roadside | Business & Industry, Iron, Railroads, Steel |
| Hastings UMWA - District 2 Labor Chautauquas | | July 22, 2007 | Brubaker Lane walking trail, Hastings (near Boro. Bldg. - 207 5th Ave.) | Roadside | Coal, Government & Politics 20th Century, Labor |
| John Brophy | | November 6, 1993 | Triangle Park, Route 271; 40.32°N 78.837°W | Roadside | Coal, Government & Politics 20th Century, Labor |
| Johnstown | | October 1, 1947 | William Penn Ave. (ST 3037) at N city line (Missing) | Roadside | Business & Industry, Steel |
| Johnstown Flood | | May 1975 | North bound side of U.S. 219, at sta. 6/45, approx. one mile south of South Fork Boro. | Roadside | Environment |
| Johnstown Flood | | May 31, 2005 | Johnstown Festival Park - 90 Johns St., near the Stone Bridge | City | Environment |
| Johnstown Flood | | August 18, 1947 | Rager's Hill Rd. & Rt. 869, near Rt. 219, 1 mile S of South Fork; 40.34707°N 78.78386°W | Roadside | Environment |
| Johnstown Local Flood Protection Project | | October 21, 1999 | Point Park, Johnstown; 40.3302°N 78.9248°W | Roadside | Environment, Government & Politics, Military |
| Lemon House | | November 19, 1958 | old U.S. 22 E of Cresson at county line | Roadside | Buildings, Business & Industry, Houses & Homesteads |
| Loretto | | June 29, 1948 | Manor Rd. (SR 1005), just outside Loretto; 40.46005°N 78.59758°W | Roadside | Education, Religion, Steel |
| Loretto | | August 19, 1947 | US 22 and PA 276 West of Cresson | Roadside | Business & Industry, Religion |
| Malcolm Cowley | | August 20, 1994 | U.S. 422, 2 miles W of Belsano; 40.5257°N 78.8864°W | Roadside | Writers |
| Portage Railroad | | August 19, 1947 | Wm. Penn Hwy. (SR 2014 / old U.S. 22) at Portage Rd., just E of Cresson; 40.45747°N 78.57277°W | Roadside | Railroads, Transportation |
| Robert E. Peary | | August 19, 1947 | Adm. Peary / Wm. Penn Hwy. (SR 2014 / old US 22) just W of Cresson; 40.46027°N 78.59933°W | Roadside | Exploration, Professions & Vocations |
| Sgt. Michael Strank | | May 17, 1986 | 125 Main St. (Pa. 271), Franklin Borough; 40.3429°N 78.8843°W | Roadside | Military, Military Post-Civil War |
| Staple Bend Tunnel | | August 19, 1947 | Pa. 271, 5 miles N of Johnstown (Missing) | Roadside | Railroads, Transportation |

== See also ==
- List of Pennsylvania state historical markers
- National Register of Historic Places listings in Cambria County, Pennsylvania
