= Berwind-White Mine 40 Historic District =

Historic district in Pennsylvania, United States

- U.S. National Register of Historic Places
- U.S. Historic district
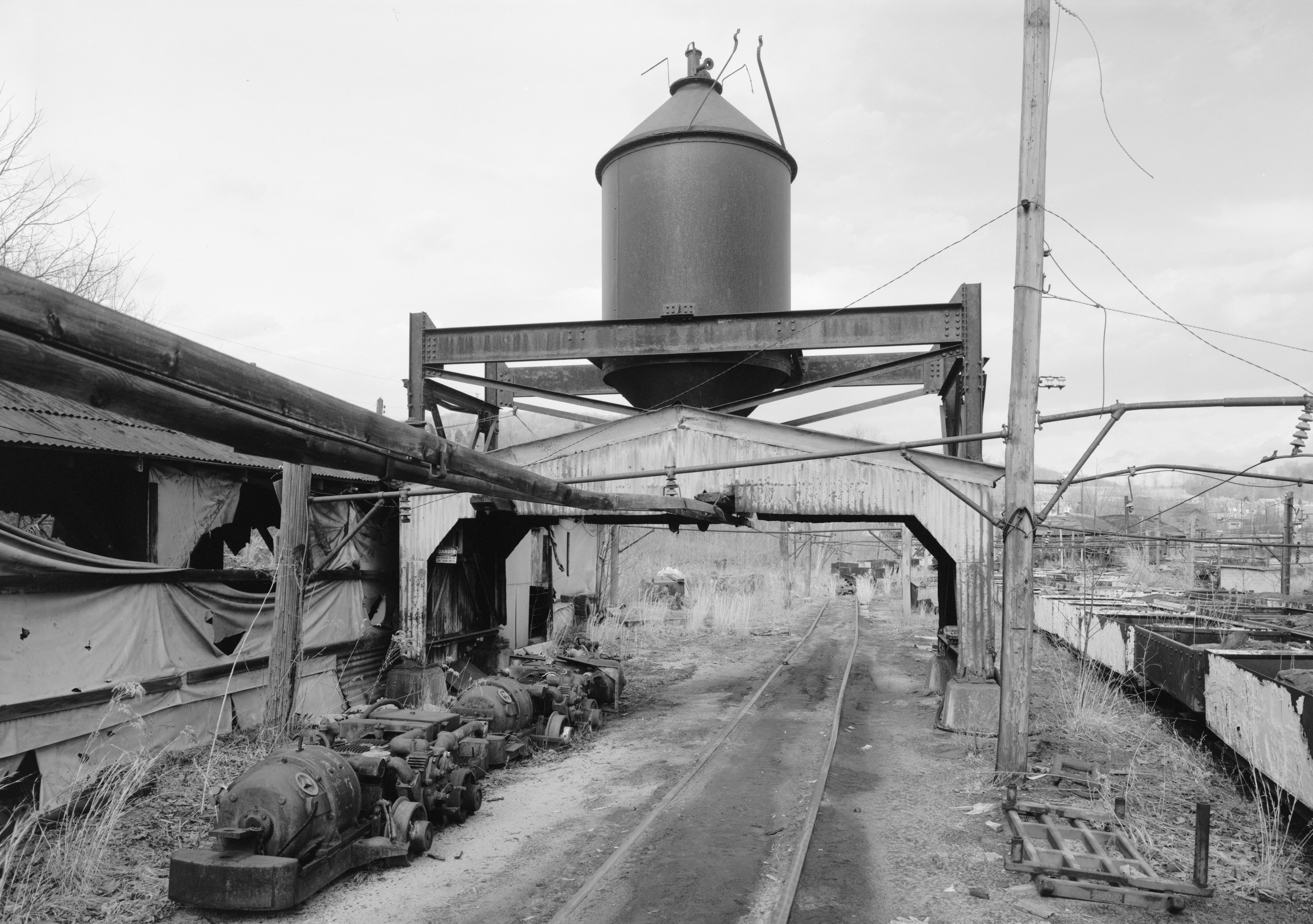
- Sand tank at Eureka No. 40, March 1988

- Location within Pennsylvania Location within the United States
- Location: Roughly bounded by the boney pile, Eureka No. 40 mine site, Scalp Level Borough line and Berwind-White Farmstead, Richland Township and Scalp Level, Pennsylvania
- Coordinates: 40°29′27″N 78°45′52″W
- Area: 194 acres (79 ha)
- Built: 1905–1941
- Architect: Windber Lumber Co.
- Architectural style: Utilitarian industrial
- NRHP reference No.: 92000392
- Added to NRHP: April 28, 1992

Berwind-White Mine 40 Historic District is a national historic district located at Richland Township and Scalp Level in Cambria County, Pennsylvania, United States. The district includes 121 contributing buildings, 2 contributing sites, and 4 contributing structures. The district consists of a mine site and patch community associated with the Berwind-White Coal Mining Company's Eureka Mine No. 40, and developed between 1905 and the 1941. Notable buildings include over 100 two-story, frame miners' double housing, power house (c. 1906, 1929), drift openings, cleaning plant, motor barn (c. 1905, 1940s, 1970s), fan house, sand tank (c. 1928), railroad repair car shop (c. 1925-1930), and wash house (c. 1923, 1930, 1957).

It was listed on the National Register of Historic Places in 1992.

Most of the Eureka No. 40 coal mine complex, except for the power house, was demolished in 2011-12.
