= Portage Historic District =

Historic district in Pennsylvania, US

- U.S. National Register of Historic Places
- U.S. Historic district
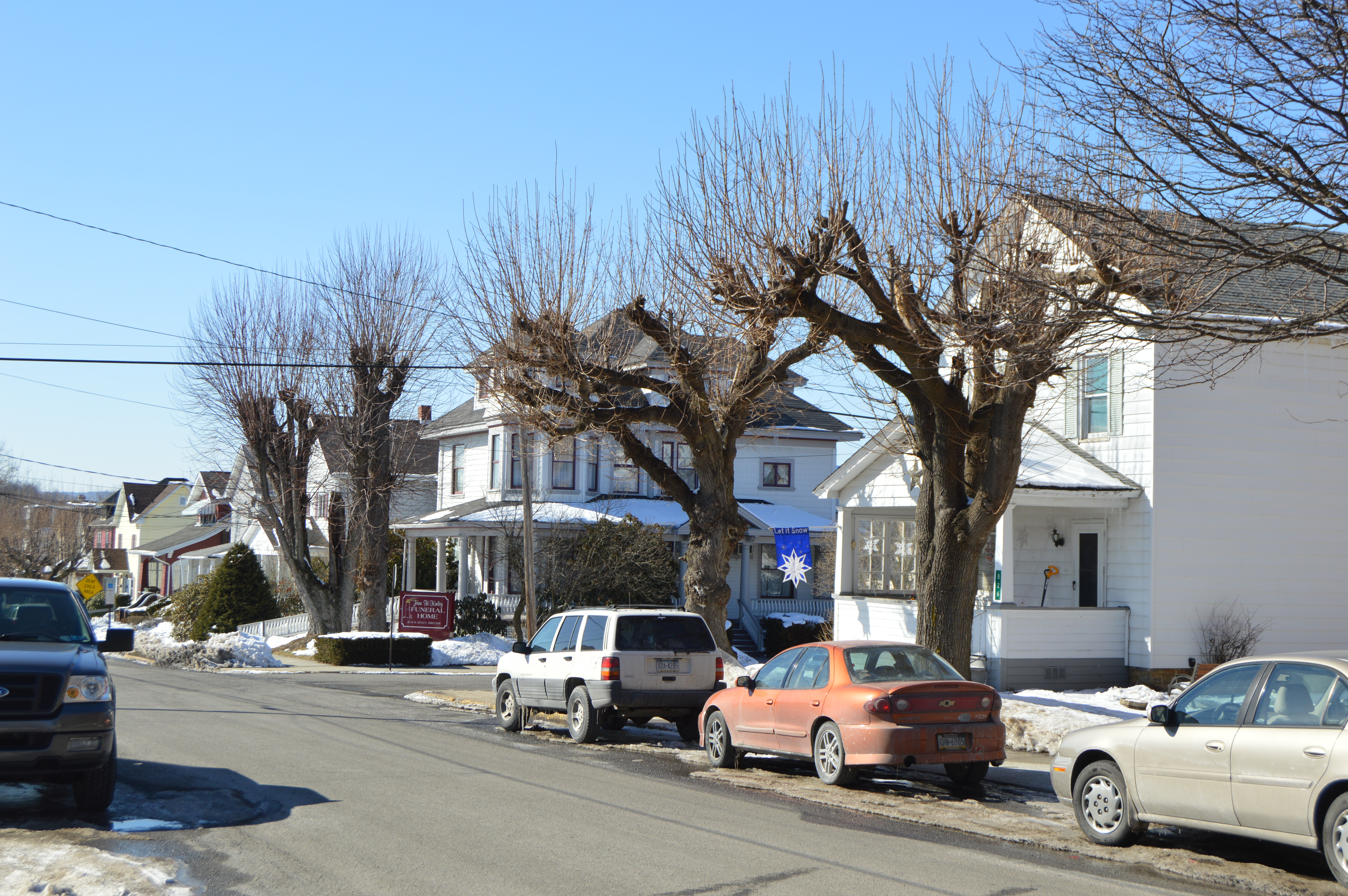
- Houses on Gillespie at Cambria

- Location within Pennsylvania Location within the United States
- Location: Roughly bounded by N. Railroad Ave., Prospect St., Johnson Ave. and Vine St., Portage Township, Portage, Pennsylvania
- Coordinates: 40°23′07″N 78°40′23″W
- Area: 95 acres (38 ha)
- NRHP reference No.: 95000890
- Added to NRHP: July 21, 1995

The Portage Historic District is a national historic district that is located in Portage in Cambria County, Pennsylvania, United States.

It was listed on the National Register of Historic Places in 1995.

== History and architectural features ==
This district encompasses 561 contributing buildings and five contributing structures, four of which are bridges. Located in the central business district and surrounding residential areas of Portage, most of the buildings were built between 1900 and 1925, with the oldest dating to the 1870s.

Notable non-residential buildings include the Pennsylvania Railroad freight station (c. 1906), the Pennsylvania Railroad passenger station (c. 1916), the Palmer Feed Mill (c. 1916), the Pearce Building (1914), the Central Hotel (c. 1916), the Century Ribbon Mill (1906-1911), the Portage Bronze Electric Company (c. 1916), First Lutheran Church (1872), St. Michael's Orthodox Church (1915), and Hungarian Hall (c. 1920).
