= Quemahoning Reservoir =

Reservoir in Pennsylvania, U.S.

- Location within Pennsylvania Location within the United States
- Location: Somerset County, Pennsylvania, United States
- Coordinates: 40°09′58″N 78°57′43″W
- Primary outflows: Stonycreek River
- Basin countries: United States
- Built: 1910 to 1913
- Surface area: 877 acres (355 ha)
- Surface elevation: 1,627 ft (496 m)

The Quemahoning Reservoir, also known to locals as The Que, is created by the Quemahoning Dam, located on Quemahoning Creek on the border of Quemahoning Township, Conemaugh Township, and Jenner Township in Somerset County, Pennsylvania just south of Hollsopple.

== History and features ==
The dam was built by the Manufacturers Water Company to supply water for the Cambria Iron Company's works in Johnstown, Pennsylvania. Construction began in 1910 and was completed in 1913, creating a reservoir that is roughly five miles long and two miles wide at its widest place, which drains into the Stonycreek River and thence into the Kiski-Conemaugh system.

The reservoir reportedly covers the American Indian village of Kickenapauling's Town, which was referred to in records of Christopher Gist, as well as in the 10 June 1779 deed of Joseph Johns, after whom Johnstown was named. It is one of the largest artificial bodies of water in Pennsylvania, and is known as a stopover for migratory waterfowl, including geese, swans, and herons.

In April 1917, a special police force was stationed at the Hickston Run and Quemahoning reservoirs as "a precaution against possible plots to cripple the great Cambria Steel Company's plant" during World War I, according to area newspapers.

The dam and reservoir were sold by Bethlehem Steel Corporation (successor to Cambria Iron) to the Cambria Somerset Authority in 2000, which now operates it both for recreation and industrial water supply.

The original sixty-six-inch pipeline built by Manufacturers Water Company from the reservoir to Johnstown was subsequently upgraded and refurbished after the sale to the Cambria Somerset Authority. Additionally, Somerset Borough, Pennsylvania has since commenced construction of a pipeline from the reservoir to the borough to provide potable water.

== Recreational use ==
Fishing, boating, camping and occasional whitewater rafting are among the recreational activities available. Upgraded release valves in 2010 substantially increased discharges from the reservoir to improve whitewater rafting on the Stonycreek River.

Bethlehem Steel Corporation ran a gun club, a farm house and Bethco Pines, a recreational park for its staff. The park included boating, swimming and facilities which employed a number of people. The dissolution of the Bethlehem Steel Corporation in the 1990s caused the recreation areas and reservoir to be put up for sale, and was included in the sale to a coalition of local governments.

Summer's Best Two Weeks (SB2W) operates portions of the former Bethco Pines recreational park located on a section of the Reservoir. The Camp is affiliated with SB2W on Lake Gloria which is approximately 5 miles away from the one on the Quemahoning Reservoir. Summer's Best Two Weeks is a Christian sports resident camp that hosts hundreds of campers during the summer for two week intervals.
