= Johnstown Flood Museum =

Historic building in Johnstown, Pennsylvania

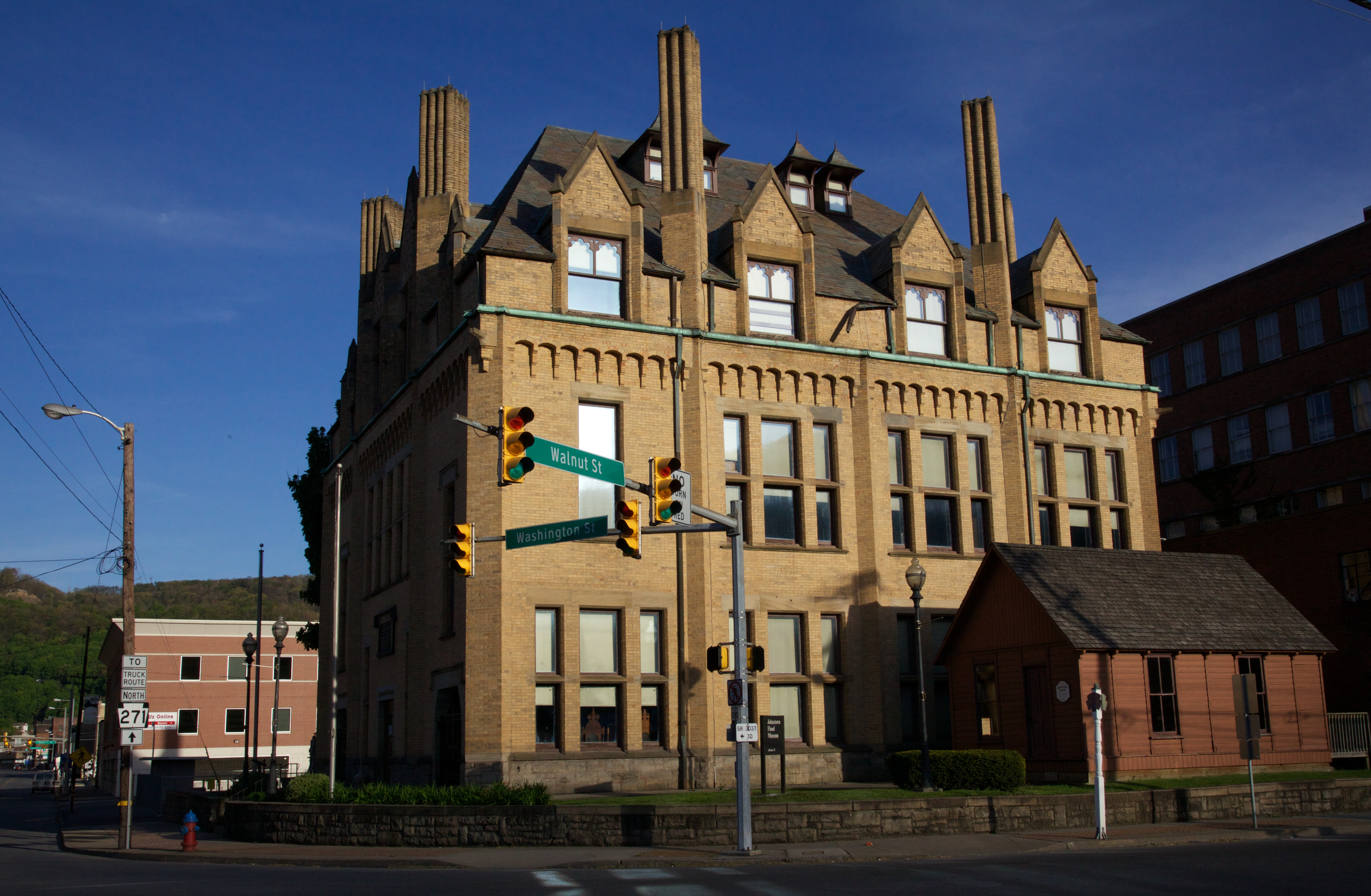

- Location within Pennsylvania Location within the United States
- Established: 1973
- Location: 304 Washington St., Johnstown, Pennsylvania
- Coordinates: 40.3278°N 78.9208°W
- Type: History Museum, Artifacts, and Local History
- President: Richard Burkert
- Website: Official website
- Cambria Public Library Building
- U.S. National Register of Historic Places
- Area: less than one acre
- Built: 1890
- Architectural style: French Gothic revival
- NRHP reference No.: 72001100
- Added to NRHP: June 19, 1972

The Johnstown Flood Museum is a history museum located in Johnstown, Pennsylvania, dedicated to the Johnstown Flood of 1889. The museum is housed in the former Cambria Public Library, which is part of the Downtown Johnstown Historic District.

== Building history ==
The Cambria Public Library building is a historic Carnegie library. It was built in 1890–1891, after the original library was destroyed in the Johnstown Flood. Andrew Carnegie, along with the Cambria Iron Company, provided all funds toward the construction and maintenance of the library through 1930. It is one of 3,000 Carnegie libraries constructed between 1885 and 1919. The building is a three-story brick structure with a tile roof encased in dormers in the French Gothic revival style.

The Cambria Public Library was a center of culture and community in Johnstown. In addition to holding over 75,000 books, the Cambria Public Library had a 300-seat auditorium, a meeting hall, a Pennsylvania State Library district center, a government documents repository, a gymnasium for the Johnstown Athletic Center, and was home to the Beth Zion Forum Lecture. The building was damaged in the Johnstown flood of 1936 and ceased to function as a library in 1971.

The Cambria Public Library building was added to the National Register of Historic Places in 1972. It has housed the Johnstown Flood Museum since 1973.

== Museum ==
The Johnstown Flood Museum opened on May 31, 1973, on the 84th anniversary of the Johnstown Flood.

The Johnstown Flood Museum chronicles the events of the flood through exhibits and media. The museum shows the documentary, The Johnstown Flood in the Robert S. Waters Theater. Exhibits include the relief map that uses lights and sounds to display the path of the flood. Surrounding the map are artifacts from the flood. The museum also features a restored "Oklahoma house", a temporary structure used to house flood survivors.

In January 2025 the museum, but not its contents, were damaged when cold weather caused a water valve to leak on the third floor. As a result, the museum was closed indefinitely. The museum reopened in September 2025 with plans to close again for renovations in late spring 2026.

== See also ==
- National Register of Historic Places listings in Cambria County, Pennsylvania
