= Colver (surname) =

Colver is a surname. Notable people with the surname include:

- Edward Colver (born 1949), American photographer
- Jim Colver (born 1958), American politician
- Nathaniel Colver (1794–1870), American Baptist clergyman
- R. Belle Colver (1882–1977), American writer and journalist
- Samuel Colver (1817–1891), Oregon pioneer
- William Byron Colver (1870–1926), chairman of the Federal Trade Commission
