= Revloc Historic District =

Historic district in Pennsylvania, United States

- U.S. National Register of Historic Places
- U.S. Historic district
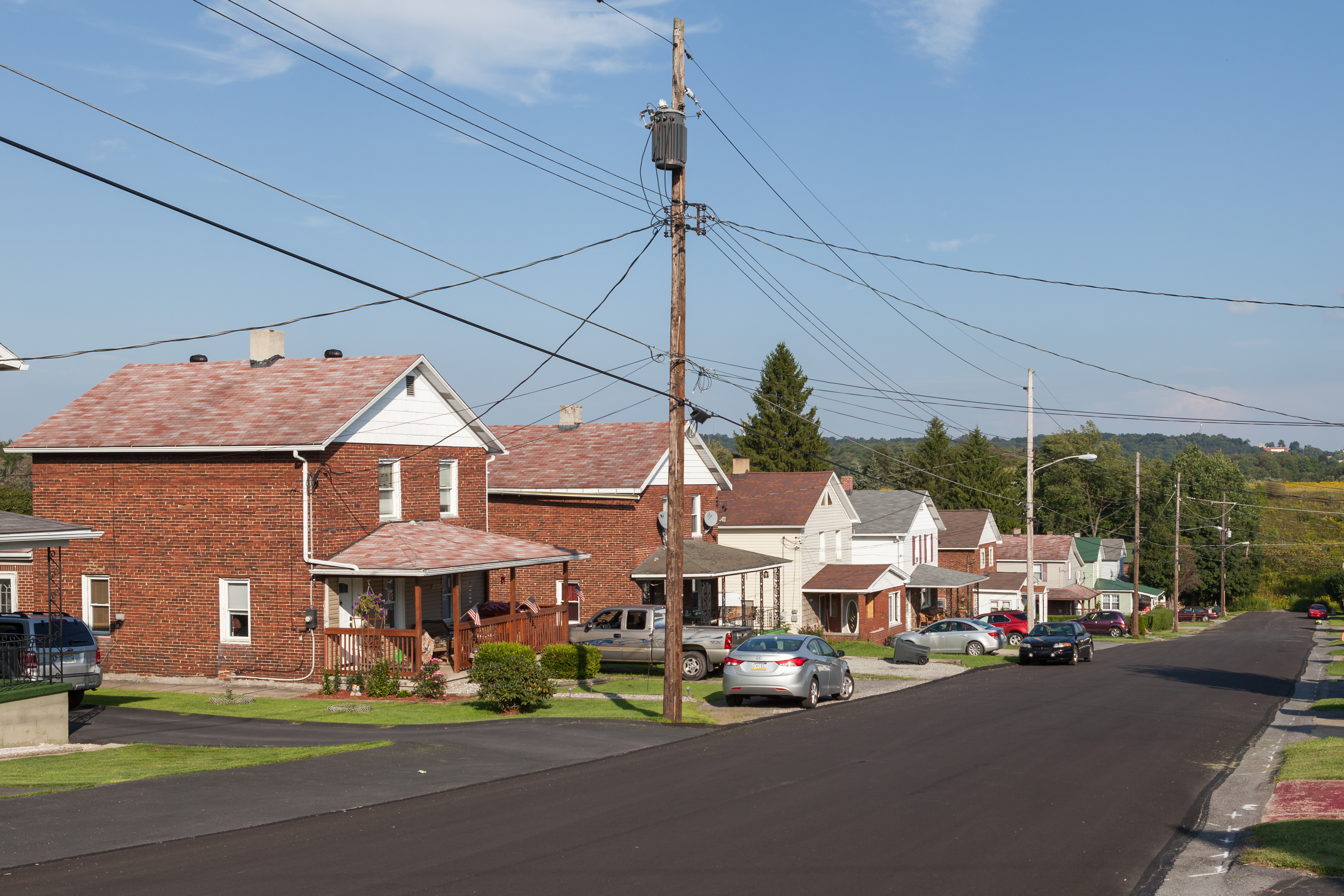
- Looking east from 625 Highland Ave

- Location within Pennsylvania Location within the United States
- Location: Roughly bounded by Highland Ave., Fourth St., Penn Ave. and Eighth St., Revloc, Cambria Township, Pennsylvania
- Coordinates: 40°29′27″N 78°45′52″W
- Area: 83 acres (34 ha)
- Built: 1917-1944
- Architect: Jencks, S. E.; et al.
- MPS: Bituminous Coal and Coke Resources of Pennsylvania MPS
- NRHP reference No.: 95000520
- Added to NRHP: May 11, 1995

The Revloc Historic District is a national historic district located at Cambria Township in Cambria County, Pennsylvania, United States.

It was listed on the National Register of Historic Places in 1995.

== History and architectural features ==
This district encompasses 203 contributing buildings, one contributing site, and one contributing structure, including residential areas and utilitarian industrial buildings that were associated with the Monroe Coal Mining Company and developed between 1917 and 1944. The mine was serviced by the Cambria and Indiana Railroad.

Notable buildings include a variety of brick and frame miners' houses, a stone company store (1918), a payroll office (c. 1916), a company boiler house (c. 1916), a supply house (c. 1918), a machine and blacksmith shop (c. 1916), the Revloc Presbyterian Church (1923), the Most Holy Redeemer Catholic Church (1924), and the Revloc School (c. 1919, 1924).
