= Cambria Somerset Authority =

The Cambria Somerset Authority (CSA) was formed in 1999, in anticipation of acquiring water interests and related land properties of Manufacturers Water Company, a subsidiary of Bethlehem Steel Corporation. Transfer of ownership occurred in August, 2000. The CSA now owns and manages 5,200 acres (21 km^{2}) in Cambria County and Somerset County Pennsylvania, including managing recreation, conservation, open space and water supply uses of the lands and water encompassing the Wilmore Dam and Reservoir, Hinckston Run Dam and Reservoir, and South Fork Dam and impoundment, all in Cambria County; and Border Dam and impoundment, and Quemahoning Reservoir and Dam, both in Somerset County.

== Financing ==
The Authority has been operating at a loss, with subsidies from Cambria County and Somerset County. Each county contributed $60,000 in 2006, and $75,000 each in 2005.

== Recreational activities ==
Recreational activities include boating, fishing, hiking, hunting, camping, whitewater rafting and nature watching. Conservation of the water and lands includes protection of riparian buffers; water quality improvements to local waterways; sustainable forest management practices; and protection of aquatic species.
