= Cambria Township, Pennsylvania =

Township in Pennsylvania, US

Coordinates: 40°29′48″N 78°44′42″W

- Township
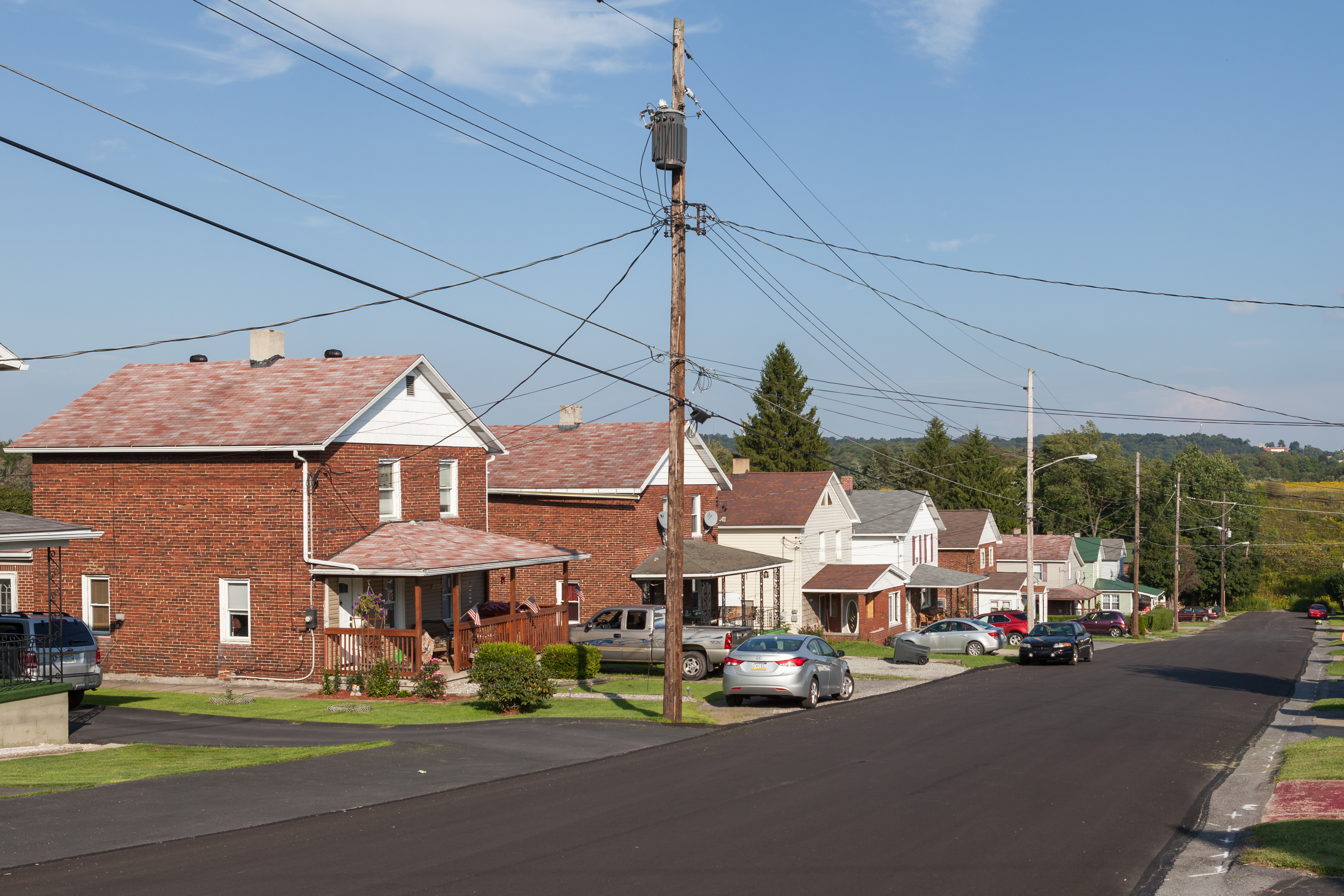
- Highland Avenue in Revloc

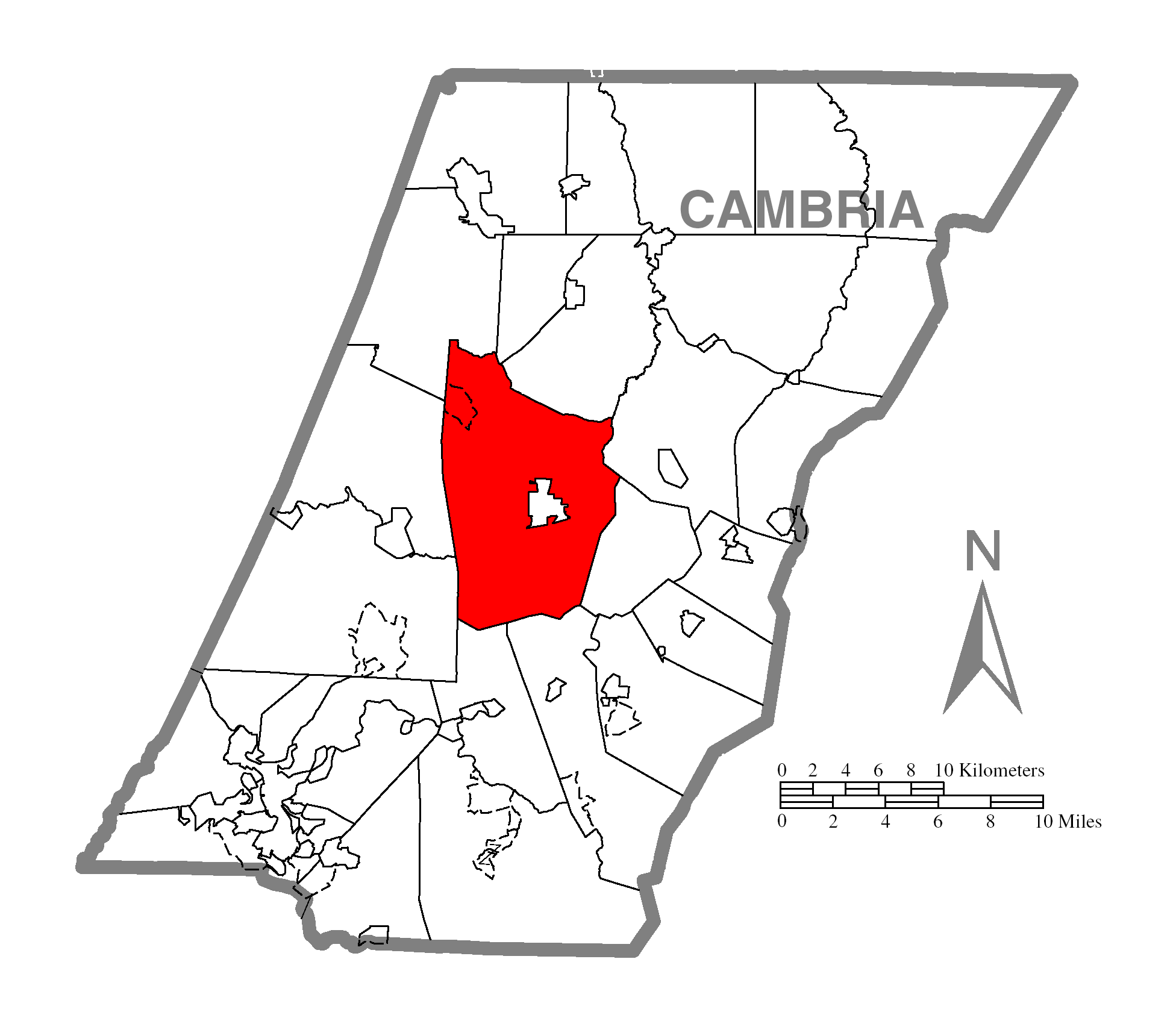
- Map of Cambria County, Pennsylvania highlighting Cambria Township

- Map of Cambria County, Pennsylvania
- Country: United States
- State: Pennsylvania
- County: Cambria
- Incorporated: 1798

Area
  - Total: 50.20 sq mi (130.02 km^{2})
  - Land: 49.86 sq mi (129.14 km^{2})
  - Water: 0.34 sq mi (0.88 km^{2})

Population (2020)
  - Total: 5,781 ▼
  - Estimate (2021): 5,730
  - Density: 117.6/sq mi (45.39/km^{2})
- Time zone: UTC-5 (Eastern (EST))
  - Summer (DST): UTC-4 (EDT)
- Area code: 814
- FIPS code: 42-021-10880
- Website: www.cambriatwp.com

Cambria Township is a township in Cambria County, Pennsylvania, United States. The population was 5,781 at the 2020 census. It is part of the Johnstown, Pennsylvania Metropolitan Statistical Area and geographically surrounds the borough of Ebensburg, the Cambria County seat.

== History ==
The Colver Historic District was listed on the National Register of Historic Places in 1994. The Revloc Historic District was listed in 1995.

== Geography ==
Cambria Township is located in the center of Cambria County at 40.515887,-78.744507, 23 miles (37 km) northeast of Johnstown and 25 miles (40 km) west of Altoona. U.S. Route 22 crosses the township from east to west, U.S. Route 219 crosses it from north to south, and U.S. Route 422 leads west from Ebensburg across the western portion of the township.

According to the United States Census Bureau, Cambria Township has a total area of 50.2 square miles (130.0 km^{2}), of which 49.8 square miles (129.1 km^{2}) is land and 0.35 square miles (0.9 km^{2}), or 0.67%, is water.

== Communities ==
=== Census-designated places ===
Census-designated places are geographical areas designated by the U.S. Census Bureau for the purposes of compiling demographic data. They are not actual jurisdictions under Pennsylvania law. Other unincorporated communities, such as villages, may be listed here as well.

- Colver
- Revloc

=== Unincorporated communities ===
- Bakersville
- Tripoli
- Winterset

== Demographics ==
Historical population
Census	Pop.	Note	%±
2000	6,323		—
2010	6,099		−3.5%
2020	5,781		−5.2%
2021 (est.)	5,730		−0.9%
U.S. Decennial Census

As of the census of 2000, there were 6,323 people, 2,015 households, and 1,470 families residing in the township. The population density was 128.4 inhabitants per square mile (49.6/km^{2}). There were 2,105 housing units at an average density of 42.7 per square mile (16.5/km^{2}). The racial makeup of the township was 95.98% White, 2.99% African American, 0.11% Native American, 0.36% Asian, 0.06% Pacific Islander, 0.08% from other races, and 0.41% from two or more races. Hispanic or Latino of any race were 0.55% of the population.

There were 2,015 households, out of which 32.7% had children under the age of 18 living with them, 61.5% were married couples living together, 7.4% had a female householder with no husband present, and 27.0% were non-families. 24.0% of all households were made up of individuals, and 12.7% had someone living alone who was 65 years of age or older. The average household size was 2.57 and the average family size was 3.06.

In the township the population was spread out, with 20.2% under the age of 18, 7.5% from 18 to 24, 28.4% from 25 to 44, 25.0% from 45 to 64, and 19.0% who were 65 years of age or older. The median age was 42 years. For every 100 females there were 104.9 males. For every 100 females age 18 and over, there were 102.7 males.

The median income for a household in the township was $32,995, and the median income for a family was $41,031. Males had a median income of $28,778 versus $22,772 for females. The per capita income for the township was $16,868. About 6.6% of families and 10.5% of the population were below the poverty line, including 14.5% of those under age 18 and 9.6% of those age 65 or over.
