= Colver, Pennsylvania =

Unincorporated community in Pennsylvania, US

- Census-designated place
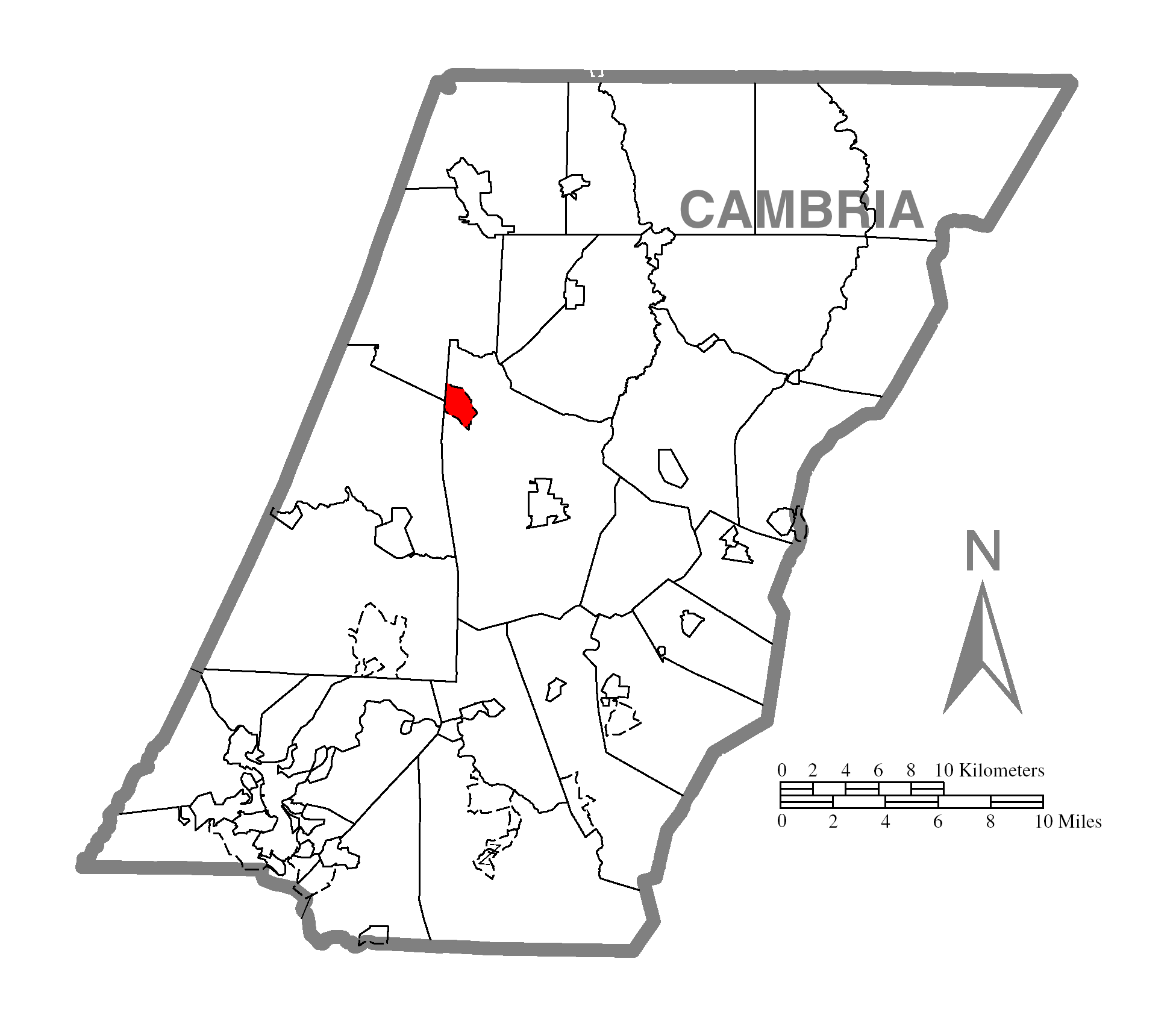
- Location within Cambria County

- Location within the U.S. state of Pennsylvania Colver (the United States)
- Coordinates: 40°32′35″N 78°47′14″W
- Country: United States
- State: Pennsylvania
- County: Cambria
- Township: Cambria

Area
  - Total: 1.26 sq mi (3.27 km^{2})
  - Land: 1.26 sq mi (3.27 km^{2})
  - Water: 0 sq mi (0.00 km^{2})
- Elevation: 2,172 ft (662 m)

Population (2020)
  - Total: 904
  - Density: 715.5/sq mi (276.26/km^{2})
- Time zone: UTC-5 (Eastern (EST))
  - Summer (DST): UTC-4 (EDT)
- ZIP code: 15927
- FIPS code: 42-15416
- GNIS feature ID: 2389349

Colver is an unincorporated community and census-designated place (CDP) in Cambria County, Pennsylvania, United States. The population was 959 at the 2010 census.

Colver got its name from B. Dawson Coleman and John Heisley Weaver, using the first three letters of Coleman and the last three letters of Weaver. Revloc is the reverse spelling of Colver.

== Geography ==
Colver is located in central Cambria County at 40°32′35″N 78°47′14″W (40.542992, -78.787314). It is in the northwestern part of Cambria Township, 7 miles (11 km) northwest of Ebensburg, the county seat.

According to the United States Census Bureau, the Colver CDP has a total area of 1.3 square miles (3.3 km^{2}), all land.

== Demographics ==
Historical population
Census	Pop.	Note	%±
1970	1,175		—
1980	1,165		−0.9%
1990	1,024		−12.1%
2000	1,035		1.1%
2010	959		−7.3%
2020	904		−5.7%
U.S. Decennial Census

At the 2000 census there were 1,035 people, 416 households, and 291 families in the CDP. The population density was 837.3 inhabitants per square mile (323.3/km^{2}). There were 445 housing units at an average density of 360.0 per square mile (139.0/km^{2}). The racial makeup of the CDP was 99.52% White, 0.10% African American and 0.39% Asian. Hispanic or Latino of any race were 0.29%.

There were 416 households, 30.8% had children under the age of 18 living with them, 55.8% were married couples living together, 9.1% had a female householder with no husband present, and 30.0% were non-families. 27.9% of households were made up of individuals, and 18.0% were one person aged 65 or older. The average household size was 2.47 and the average family size was 3.00.

The age distribution was 23.3% under the age of 18, 8.6% from 18 to 24, 27.5% from 25 to 44, 22.8% from 45 to 64, and 17.8% 65 or older. The median age was 39 years. For every 100 females, there were 99.4 males. For every 100 females age 18 and over, there were 92.7 males.

The median household income was $23,388 and the median family income was $28,421. Males had a median income of $30,114 versus $16,944 for females. The per capita income for the CDP was $12,219. About 9.9% of families and 17.1% of the population were below the poverty line, including 30.1% of those under age 18 and 10.6% of those age 65 or over.

== Education ==
It is in the Central Cambria School District..
