= Stonycreek River =

River in Pennsylvania, United States

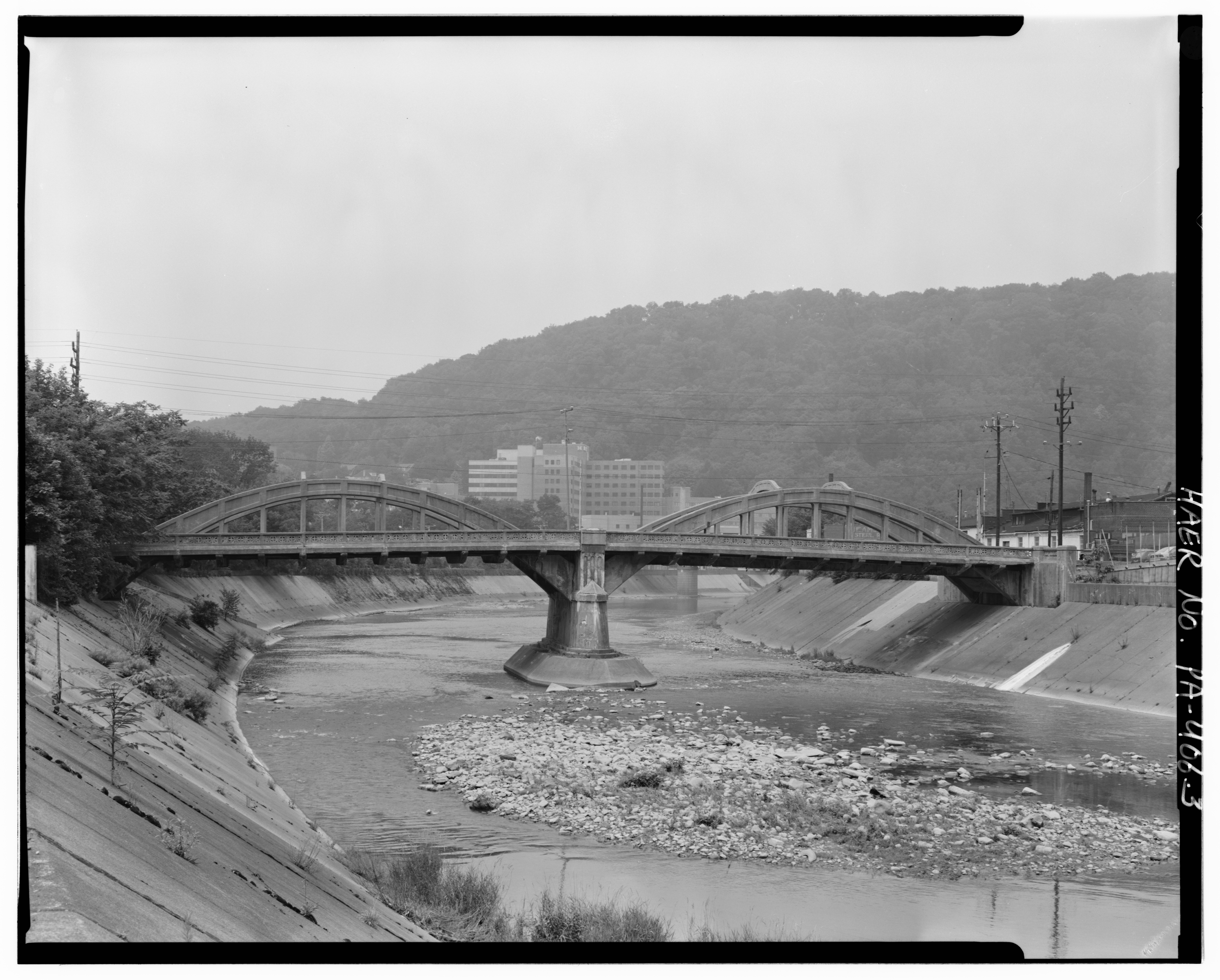

Location
- Country: United States

Physical characteristics
- Source
  - coordinates: 39.927025°N 78.9586355°W
- Mouth
  - coordinates: 40.3309072°N 78.9253033°W
  - elevation: 1,138 ft (347 m)
- Discharge
  - location: Ferndale
  - average: 704 cu ft/s (19.9 m^{3}/s)

Basin features
- River system: Allegheny River

The Stonycreek River (also referred to as Stony Creek) is a tributary of the Conemaugh River, approximately 45 mi (72 km) long, in southwestern Pennsylvania, United States.

== Course ==
It rises in the mountains of eastern Somerset County from the headwater spring, Pius Spring, in Berlin, and flows north past Shanksville, Stoystown, Hooversville, and Ferndale. It joins the Little Conemaugh River at Johnstown to form the Conemaugh River. Additional variant names include: Achsinne-hanne, Gordon, and Sinne-hanna.

The river basin is in a highly scenic area but had been considered among the most degraded in the state, largely as the result of acid mine drainage from the long history of coal mining in the region. The recovery of the river has been an ongoing project of federal, state, and private agencies, and continues to progress. In recent decades, the river has become a popular destination for trout fishing.

== Recreation ==
Following the sale of the Quemahoning Reservoir by Bethlehem Steel Corporation to the Cambria Somerset Authority, there have been periodic releases of water into the Stonycreek in order to facilitate whitewater rafting as an additional recreational opportunity. As of early 2010, there was a proposal to substantially increase discharges from the reservoir to improve whitewater rafting on the Stonycreek River. A local canoe club secured a grant for $500,000 and raised the remaining $500,000 needed for repairs to the dam valve, which were needed to enable recreational releases. There are now biweekly whitewater releases on the river throughout the summer.

== See also ==
- List of rivers of Pennsylvania
- List of tributaries of the Allegheny River
