= Colver Historic District =

Historic district in Pennsylvania, United States

- U.S. National Register of Historic Places
- U.S. Historic district
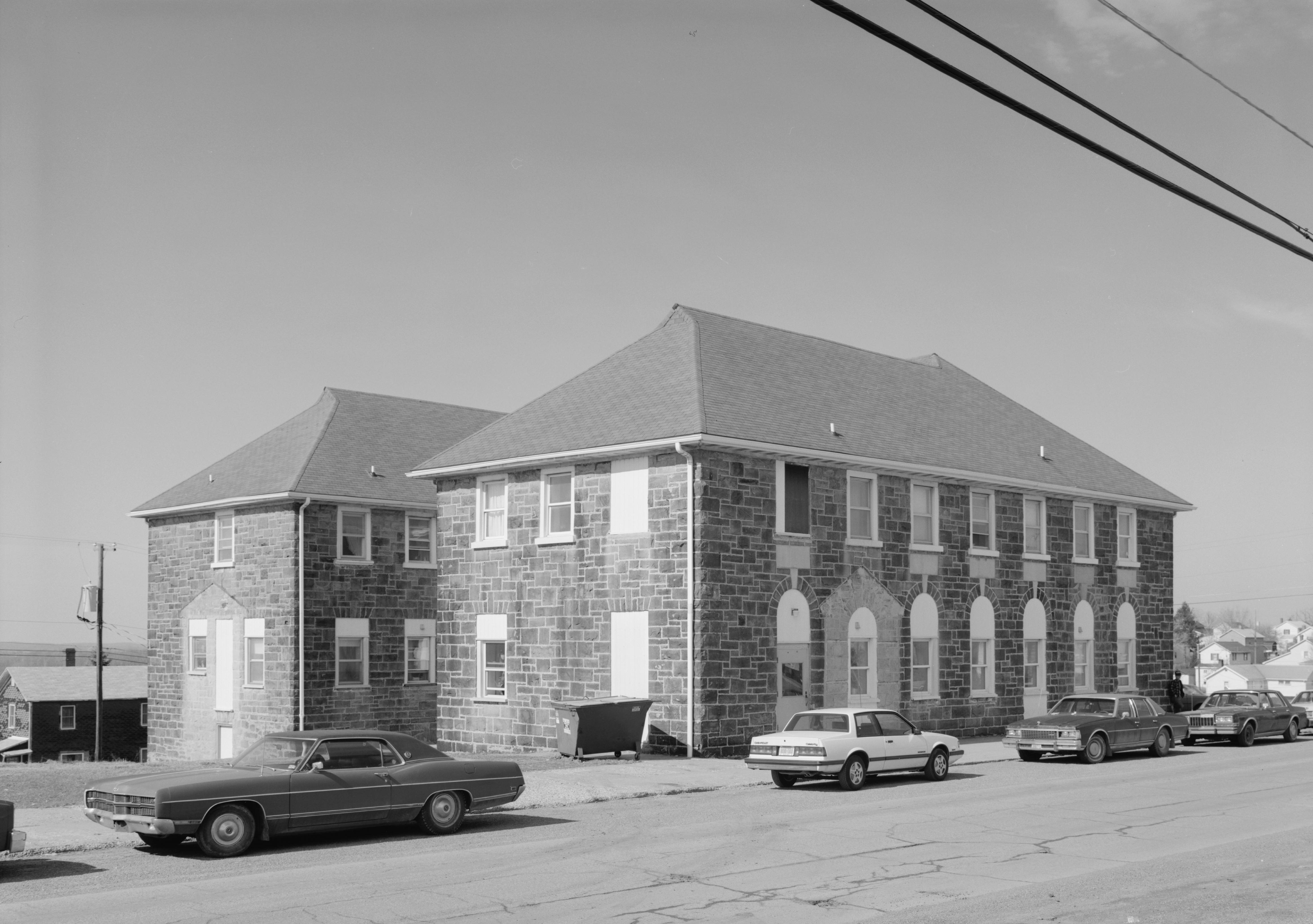
- Colver Hotel, 1988

- Location within Pennsylvania Location within the United States
- Location: Roughly bounded by Ninth Ave., the Ebensburg Coal Company Power Building and Bakerville, Colver, Barr Township and Cambria Township, Pennsylvania
- Coordinates: 40°32′36″N 78°47′46″W
- Area: 272 acres (110 ha)
- Built: 1911–1943
- Architect: S.H. Jenks, Horace Trumbauer
- Architectural style: Company Housing
- MPS: Bituminous Coal and Coke Resources of Pennsylvania MPS
- NRHP reference No.: 94000521
- Added to NRHP: June 3, 1994

Colver Historic District is a national historic district located at Barr Township and Cambria Township in Cambria County, Pennsylvania, United States. The district includes 336 contributing buildings, 5 contributing sites, and 3 contributing structures. The district consists of residential areas, coal mining resources, Cambria and Indiana Railroad shop buildings, and a dairy farm associated with the Ebensburg Coal Company's mine and developed between 1911 and 1943. Notable buildings include a variety of brick and frame workers' housing, the Ebensburg Coal Company office building (1914), stone company store (1912), Colver Amusement Company (1912), Colver Hotel (1912), Colver Presbyterian Church (1915), public school (1927), hospital (1914), Roundhouse No. 1 (1918), Roundhouse No. 2 (1920), and main power building (1911).

Colver district was listed on the National Register of Historic Places in 1994.
