= Downtown Johnstown Historic District =

Historic district in Pennsylvania, United States

- U.S. National Register of Historic Places
- U.S. Historic district
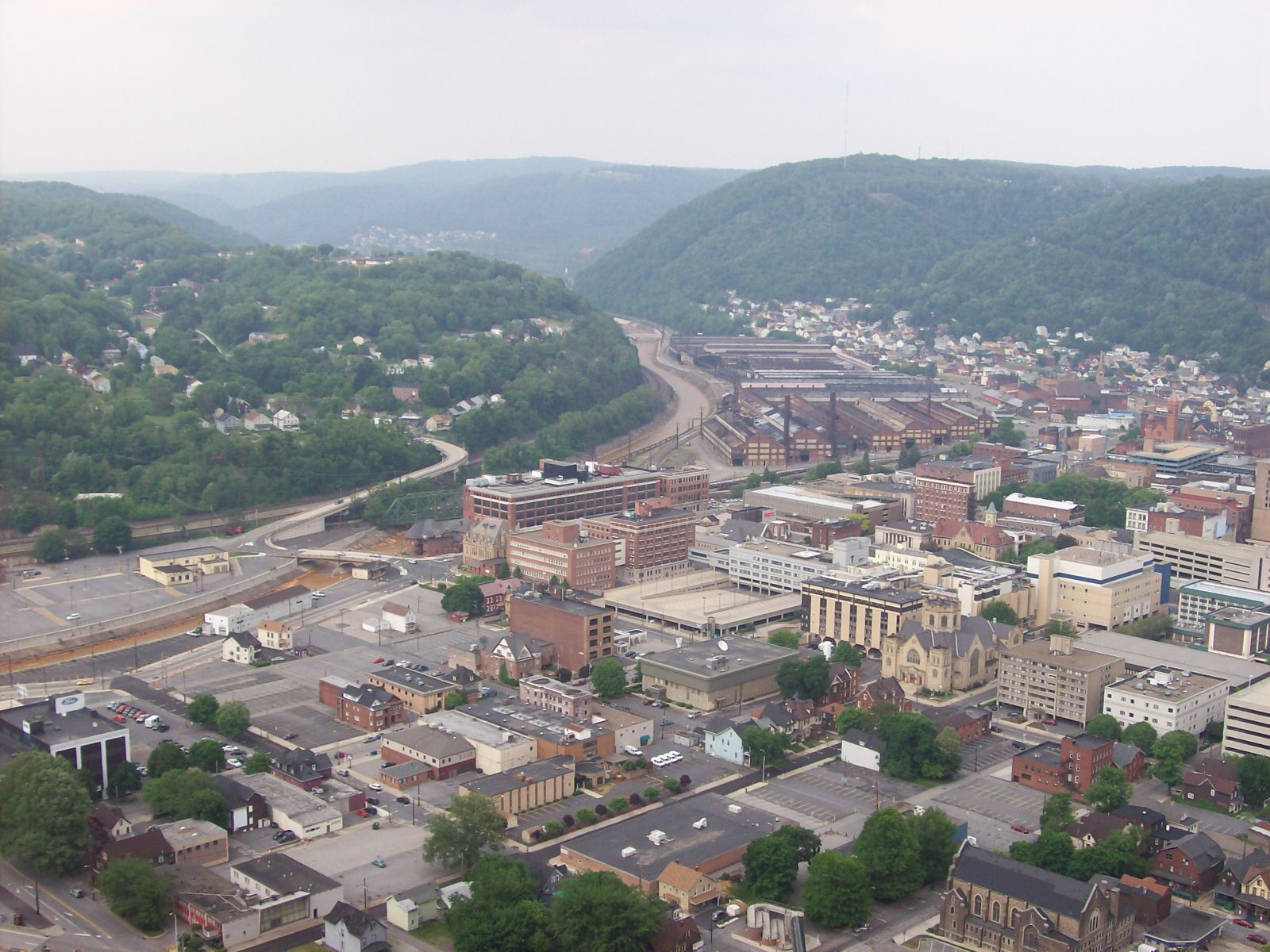
- Downtown Johnstown, February 2006

- Location within Pennsylvania Location within the United States
- Location: Bounded by Washington, Clinton, Bedford, Vine, Market, Locust and Walnut Sts., Johnstown, Pennsylvania
- Coordinates: 40°19′30″N 78°55′07″W
- Area: 50 acres (20 ha)
- Built: 1889
- Architect: Multiple
- Architectural style: Second Empire, Art Deco, Romanesque
- NRHP reference No.: 92000941
- Added to NRHP: August 7, 1992

Downtown Johnstown Historic District is a national historic district in Johnstown, Cambria County, Pennsylvania, United States. The district includes 109 contributing buildings, 4 contributing sites, and 1 contributing structure in Johnstown's central business district and surrounding residential areas. The district consists of some buildings dated before the Johnstown Flood, but the majority date from 1890 to 1930. Notable buildings include the Alma Hall (1884), Bantley Building (1888), Stenger Dry Goods Store (1883), Widmann Building (1892), Cambria Iron Office Building (1881, 1885), St. Vincent DePaul Building (c. 1900), Swank Building (1907), Glosser Brothers Department Store (1905), Johnstown City Hall (1900), former U.S. Post Office (1912), State Theater (1926), U.S. Post Office (1938), Franklin Street United Methodist Church (1869), St. John Gualbert Cathedral (1896), First United Methodist Church (1911), Elks Building (1903), and Moose Building (1917). Located in the district and listed separately are the Cambria Public Library Building, G.A.R. Hall, and Nathan's Department Store.

It was listed on the National Register of Historic Places in 1992.

== Gallery ==
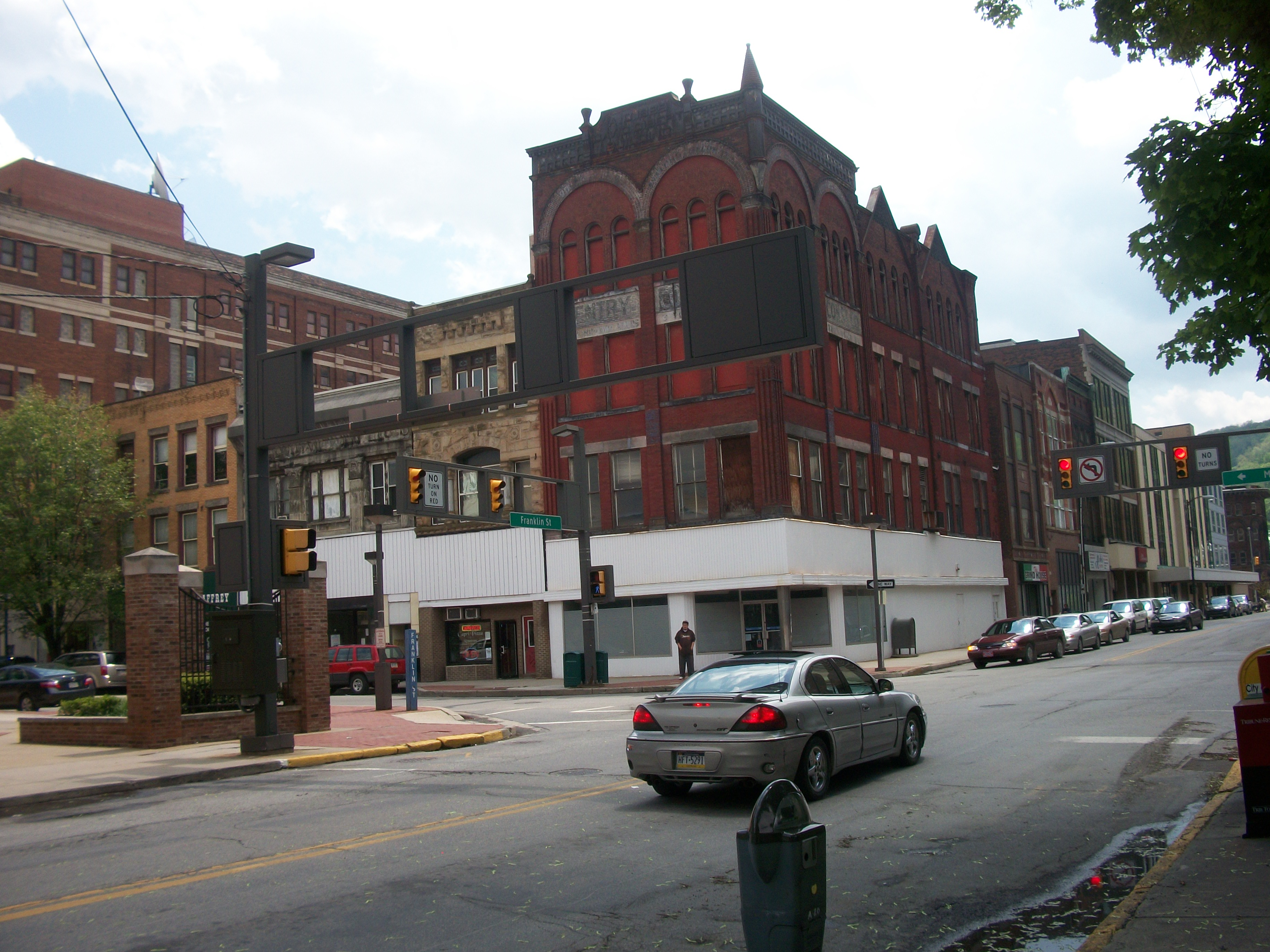
Downtown Johnstown, May 2010

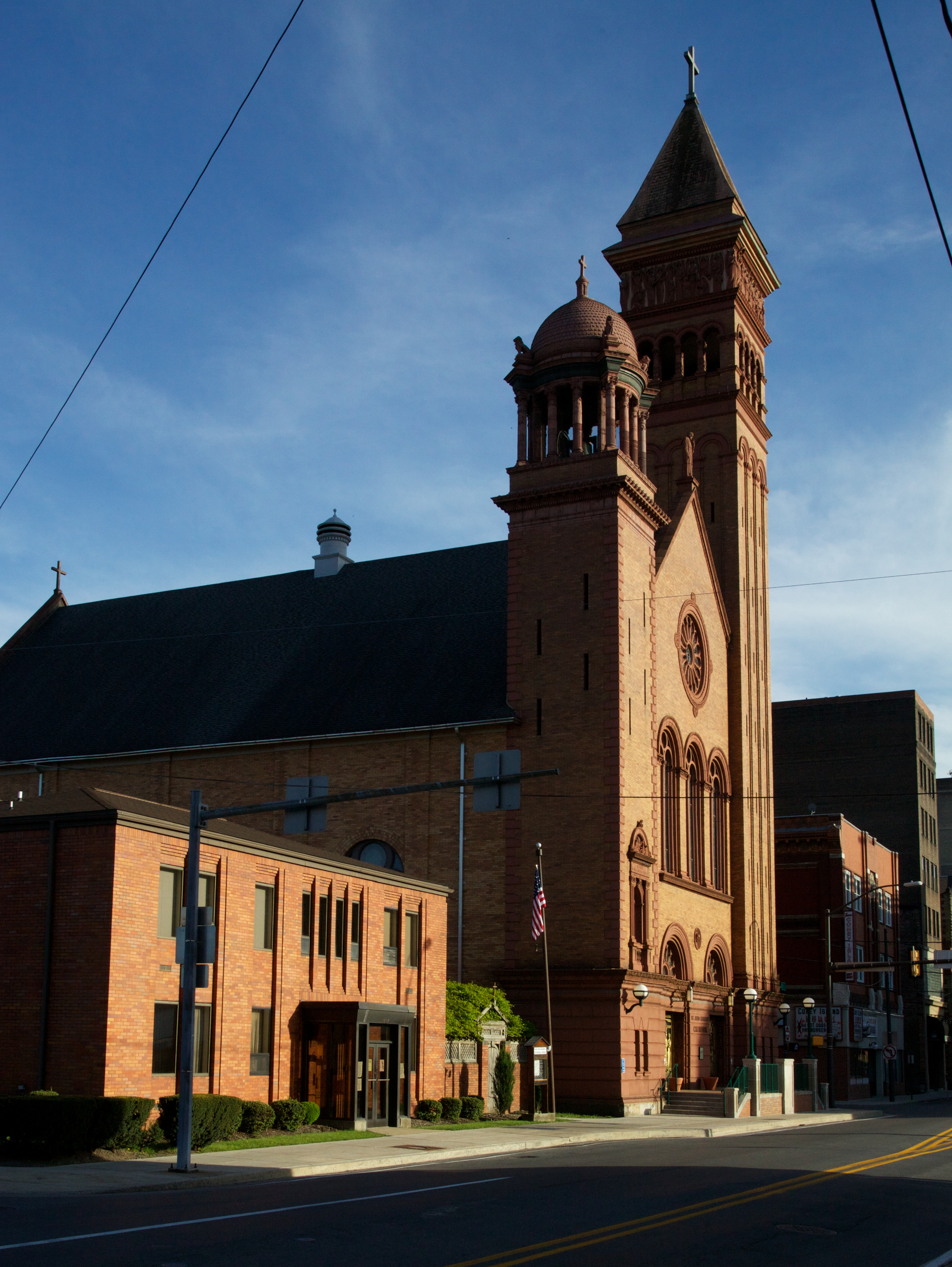
St. John Gualbert Cathedral
