= In Sunlight, in a Beautiful Garden =

2001 historical novel by Kathleen Cambor

In Sunlight, In a Beautiful Garden
- Author: Kathleen Cambor
- Cover artist: First edition
- Language: English
- Genre: Novel
- Publisher: Farrar, Straus and Giroux
- Publication date: 2001
- Publication place: United States
- Media type: Print (hardback)
- Pages: 256 pp
- ISBN: 0-374-16537-8
- OCLC: 44090481
- Dewey Decimal: 813/.54 21
- LC Class: PS3553.A4277 I5 2001
- Preceded by: The Book of Mercy

In Sunlight, In a Beautiful Garden (2001) is a historical novel by American writer Kathleen Cambor.

It is based around events of the Johnstown Flood of 1889, when more than 2,000 people drowned after the collapse of the South Fork Dam. It has fictional characters in major roles, with historical figures as minor characters.

== Description ==
The novel portrays historical figures of the South Fork Fishing and Hunting Club, such as the industrialists Henry Clay Frick, Andrew Mellon, and Andrew Carnegie, in cameo roles.

Fictional characters include Frank Fallon, a steel mill foreman and American Civil War veteran; his son Daniel, a labor organizer; James Talbot, a lawyer hired for the club; and his daughter Nora, an amateur naturalist who believes that the dam, built to provide an Eden for the captains of industry, is likely to fail.

== Reception ==
The novel was selected as a New York Times Notable Book of 2001.
