= Grand Army of the Republic Hall (Johnstown, Pennsylvania) =

- U.S. National Register of Historic Places
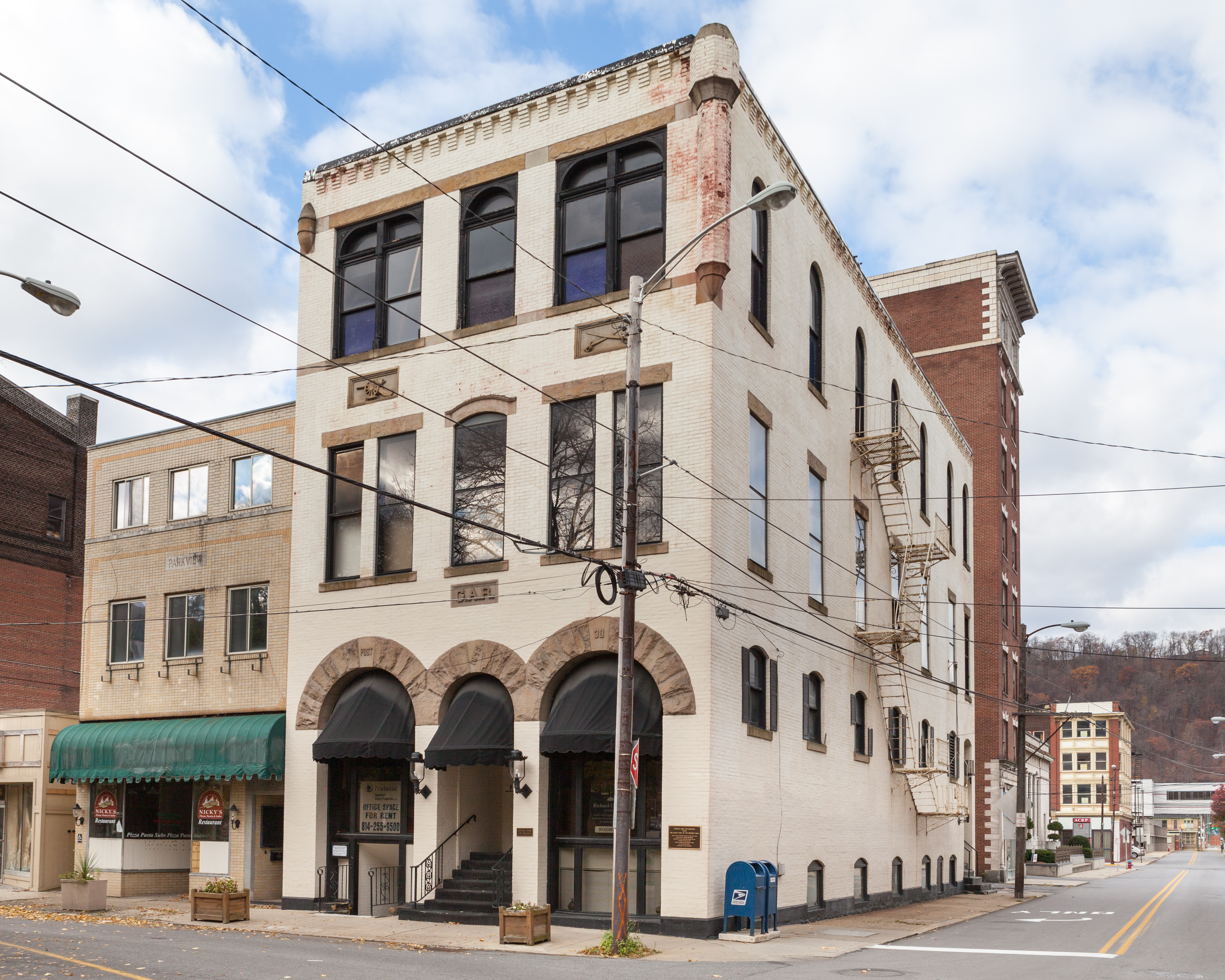
- Seen from Locust Street in 2014

- Location within Pennsylvania Location within the United States
- Location: 132 Park Pl., Johnstown, Pennsylvania
- Coordinates: 40°19′34.4″N 78°55′6.88″W
- Area: 0.1 acres (0.040 ha)
- Built: 1893
- NRHP reference No.: 80003451
- Added to NRHP: April 17, 1980

The Grand Army of the Republic Hall is an historic clubhouse building in Johnstown, Cambria County, Pennsylvania, United States.

It was added to the National Register of Historic Places in 1980.

== History and architectural features ==
Built in 1893, the Grand Army of the Republic Hall, which is located in the Downtown Johnstown Historic District, is a three-story brick building with a flat roof, three bays by seven bays. The front facade features two carved stone insets with a cannon and crossed sword motif. It was built by the local chapter of the Grand Army of the Republic and was subsequently converted to business office space. The building was damaged in the Flood of 1977.
