= Nathan's Department Store =

- U.S. National Register of Historic Places
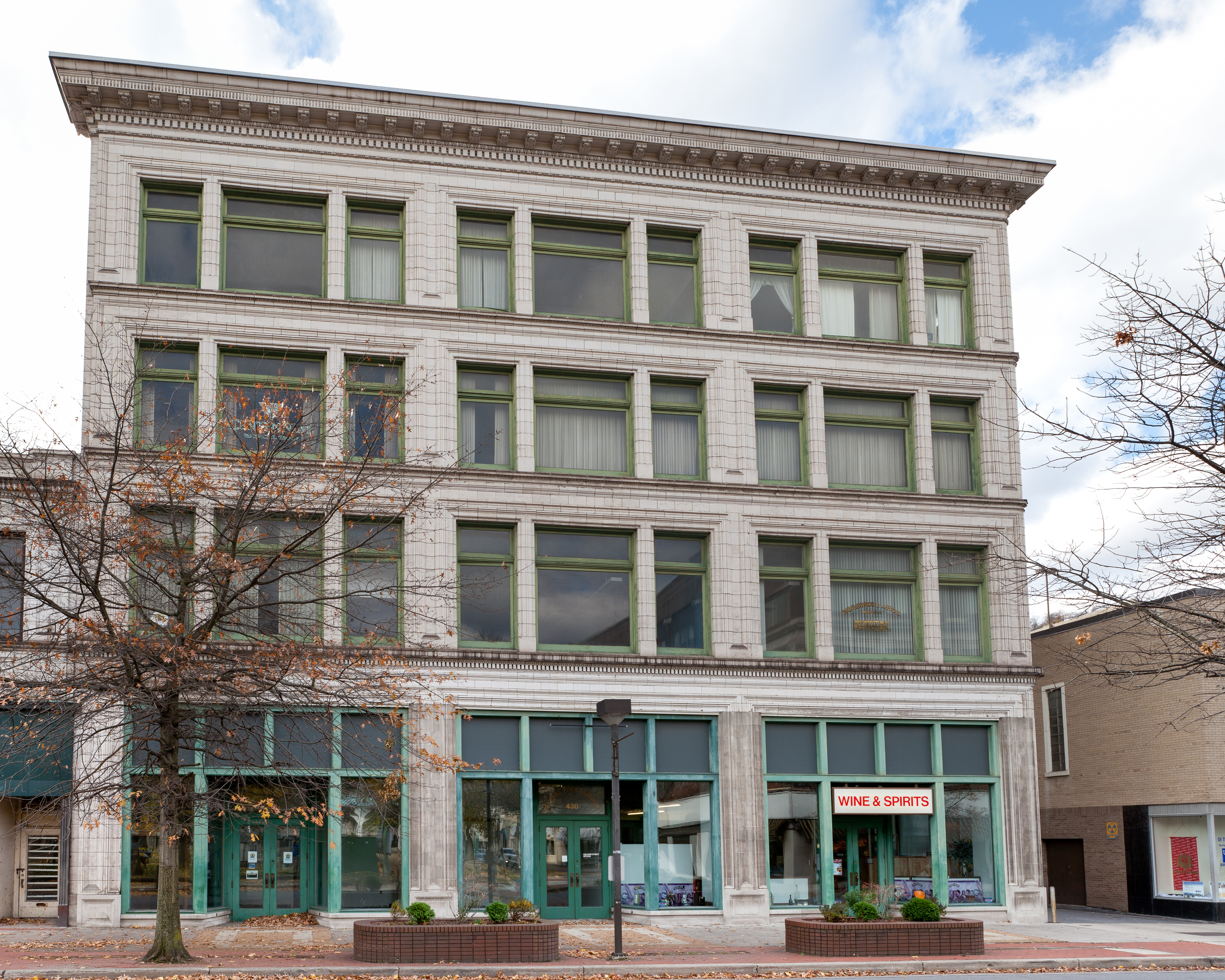
- The store in November 2014

- Location within Pennsylvania Location within the United States
- Location: 426-432 Main St, Johnstown, Pennsylvania
- Coordinates: 40°19′31″N 78°55′8″W
- Area: 0.3 acres (0.12 ha)
- Built: 1917
- Architectural style: Early Commercial
- NRHP reference No.: 79002178
- Added to NRHP: August 10, 1979

Nathan's Department Store is a historic department store building that is located in Johnstown, Cambria County, Pennsylvania, United States.

Located in the Downtown Johnstown Historic District, it was added to the National Register of Historic Places in 1979.

== History and architectural features ==
Built in 1917, this historic structure is a four-story, brick building with a finished basement. The front facade features glazed architectural terra cotta in a simplified classical motif. The building was damaged in the Flood of 1977. For many years the building housed an S. S. Kresge store.
