= Alma Hall =

Building in Johnstown, Pennsylvania

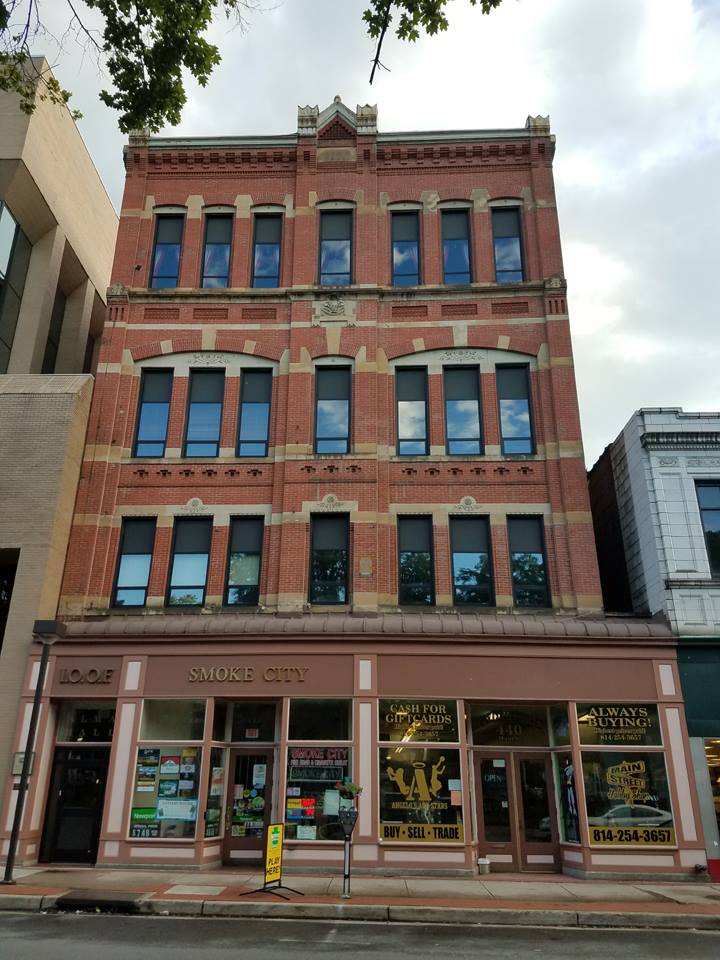

General information
- Architectural style: Queen Anne Commercial Architecture
- Address: 440-442 Main Street
- Town or city: Johnstown, Pennsylvania
- Coordinates: 40.325074°N 78.918691°W
- Groundbreaking: 1883
- Completed: August 30, 1884
- Owner: Alma Lodge #523

Website
- http://www.almalodge523.org

Alma Hall is the home of Alma Lodge #523 of the Independent Order of Odd Fellows, located in Johnstown, Pennsylvania. Alma Hall was the first four-story building in the city of Johnstown, and is the oldest building built by a fraternal organization in downtown Johnstown. The building served as a refuge for survivors of the Johnstown Flood in 1889.

== Building History ==
Alma Hall was officially opened on August 30, 1884. The building was constructed as the home of Alma Lodge, but also served as offices for local doctors, attorneys, and other professionals. The building is an example of Queen Anne style architecture and was one of the first four-story buildings in downtown Johnstown.

== The 1889 Johnstown Flood ==
Alma Hall was one of four buildings that survived the Johnstown Flood in 1889, being shielded by the First Methodist Episcopal Church (now Franklin Street United Methodist Church). While the first floor was under water and debris, the remaining floors were quickly occupied by 264 survivors. The survivors included Dr. W.E. Matthews who helped those who needed medical attention (including delivering two babies) while suffering from three cracked ribs. Another survivor was Attorney James Walters, who was carried by the flood waters and thrown through the window into his own office. The building was used as a headquarters for relief distribution following the flood.

== Alma Hall Today ==
As it has since its opening, Alma Lodge #523, I.O.O.F. serves as the owner and primary tenant of the building. William F. Packer Encampment, a subordinate branch of the order, also meets at the lodge. The lodge and encampment offices are located on the second floor and the meeting room and dining room are located on the fourth floor. A smoke shop and collectibles shop are located on the ground floor, while an attorney and an accountant occupy space on the second floor. The building's third floor is currently vacant, but is used by the lodge as storage space.
