= The Book of Mercy =

Novel by Kathleen Cambor

- First edition
- Author: Kathleen Cambor
- Language: English
- Genre: Novel
- Publisher: Farrar, Straus and Giroux
- Publication date: 1996
- Publication place: United States
- Media type: Print (hardback)
- Pages: 261 pp
- ISBN: 0-374-11550-8
- OCLC: 33666111
- Dewey Decimal: 813/.54 20
- LC Class: PS3553.A4277 B66 1996

The Book of Mercy is the debut novel of the American writer Kathleen Cambor.

Narrated in alternate chapters by Edmund Mueller, an 83-year-old retired Pittsburgh, Pennsylvania firefighter, and his daughter, Anne, a 42-year-old psychiatrist and single mother, the novel weaves a family saga of two Catholic German-Americans.
