= Kathleen Cambor =

American author

Kathleen Cambor is an American author. Her novels include The Book of Mercy, which received the Janet Heidinger Kafka Prize and was a finalist for the PEN/Faulkner Award for Fiction. She was awarded a Guggenheim Fellowship in 2001 for her second novel, In Sunlight, In a Beautiful Garden. The novel was selected as a New York Times Notable Book of 2001.

She was the director for the University of Houston creative writing program from 1997 to 2000. She is currently a visiting professor at Rice University in Houston, Texas.

== Bibliography ==
- In Sunlight, in a Beautiful Garden: A Novel (2002)
