= Johnstown Flood =

1889 disaster in Pennsylvania

Coordinates: 40°20′54.8″N 78°46′30.3″W

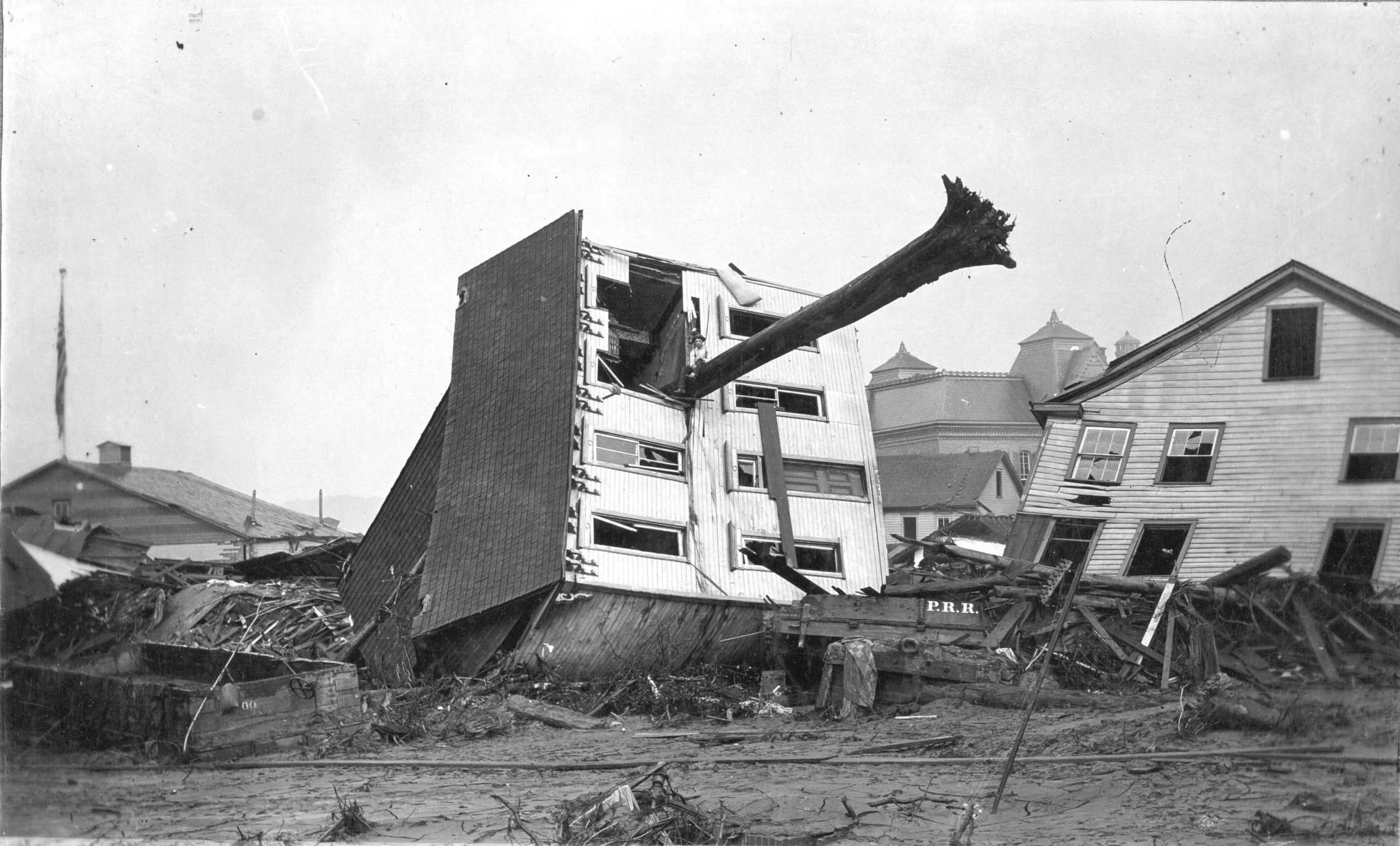
- The John Schultz house in Johnstown after the flood

Meteorological history
- Duration: May 31, 1889

Overall effects
- Fatalities: 2,208
- Damage: US$17 million (equivalent to $551 million in 2025)
- Areas affected: South Fork, East Conemaugh, and Johnstown in Pennsylvania, U.S.

The Johnstown Flood, sometimes referred to locally as the Great Flood of 1889, occurred on Friday, May 31, 1889, after the catastrophic failure of the South Fork Dam, located on the south fork of the Little Conemaugh River, 14 miles (23 km) upstream of the town of Johnstown, Pennsylvania, United States. The dam ruptured after several days of extremely heavy rainfall, releasing 14.55 million cubic meters of water. With a volumetric flow rate that temporarily equaled the average flow rate of the Mississippi River, the flood killed 2,208 people and accounted for US$17 million (equivalent to $551 million in 2025) in damage. In terms of loss of life, it was the worst flash flood in U.S. history.

The American Red Cross, led by Clara Barton and with 50 volunteers, undertook a major disaster relief effort. Support for victims came from all over the United States and 18 foreign countries. After the flood, survivors suffered a series of legal defeats in their attempts to recover damages from the dam's owners. This led in the 20th century to American Tort law allowing, in some circumstances, strict liability rather than fault-based liability.

The events have been commemorated both nationally and locally; the Johnstown Flood National Memorial was established in 1964, and the National Historic Landmark District of the South Fork Fishing and Hunting Club was established in 1986. Both are administered by the National Park Service.

== History ==
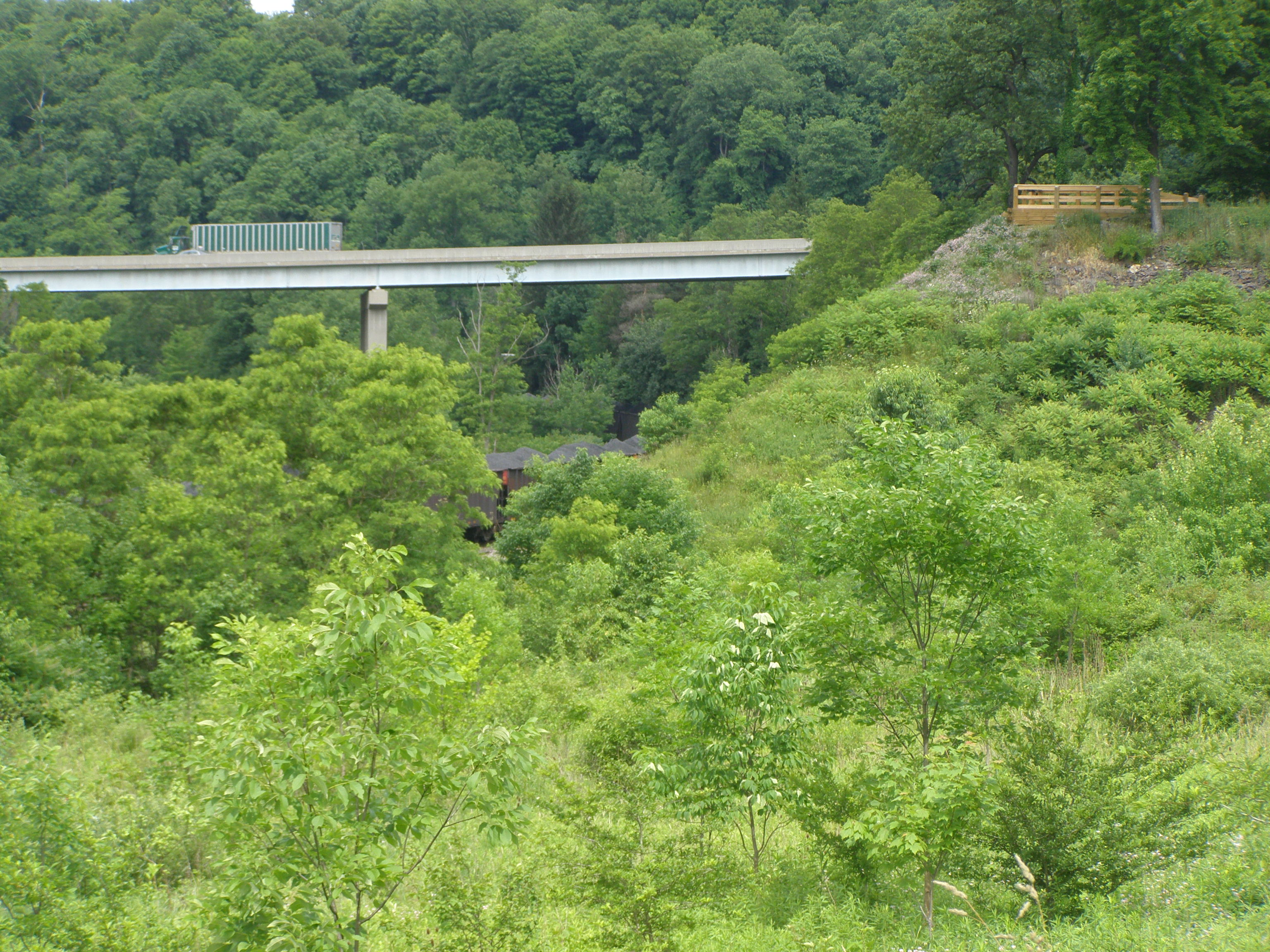
The remaining abutment of the South Fork Dam with the US-219 highway bridge downstream in the background

The city of Johnstown, Pennsylvania was founded in 1800 by Swiss immigrant Joseph Johns (anglicized from "Schantz"), where the Stonycreek and Little Conemaugh rivers joined to form the Conemaugh River. It began to prosper with the building of the Pennsylvania Main Line Canal in 1836.

Construction of the Pennsylvania Railroad and the Cambria Iron Works in the 1850s brought further industry to town, and eventually led to abandonment of the canal. By 1889, Johnstown's industries had attracted numerous Welsh and German immigrants to work. With a population of 30,000, it was a growing industrial community known for the quality of its steel.

The high, steep hills of the narrow Conemaugh Valley and the Allegheny Mountains to the east had restricted development in Johnstown, keeping it close to the riverfront. The valley received large amounts of runoff from rain and snowfall. The area surrounding the city is prone to flooding due to its location along rivers whose upstream watersheds include an extensive drainage basin of the Allegheny Plateau. In addition to these factors, slag from the iron furnaces of the steel mills was dumped along the river to create more land for building, narrowing the riverbed. Developers' artificial narrowing of the riverbed to maximize early industries left the city even more flood-prone.

Immediately downstream of Johnstown, the Conemaugh River is hemmed in by steep mountainsides for about 10 miles (16 km). A roadside plaque alongside Pennsylvania Route 56, which follows this river, proclaims that this stretch of valley is the deepest river gorge in North America east of the Rocky Mountains.

=== South Fork Dam and Lake Conemaugh ===
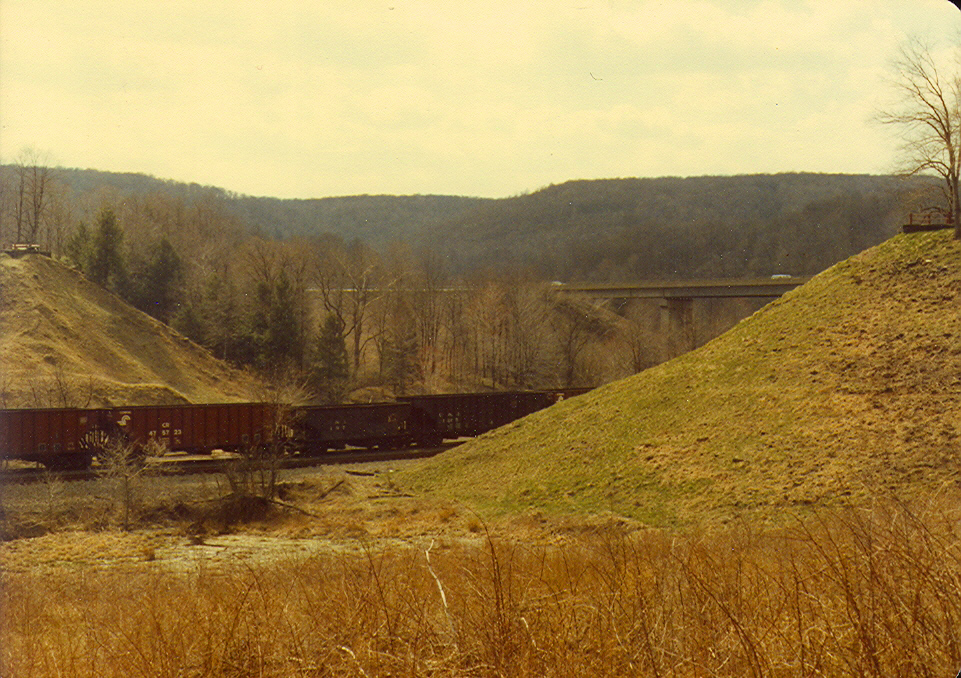
Remains of the South Fork Dam abutment with US-219 downstream in the background as it appeared in 1980

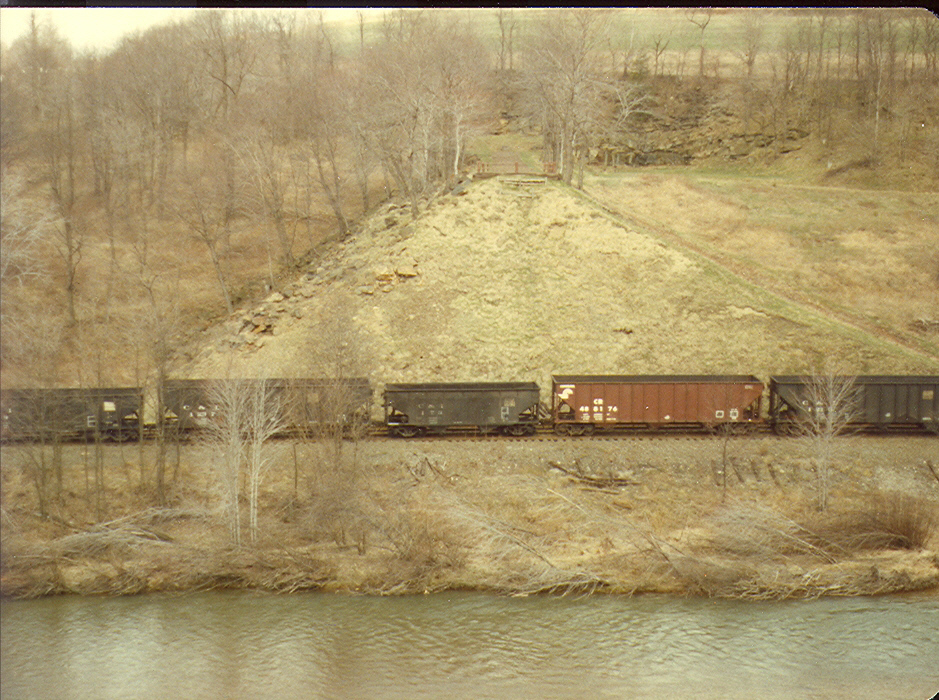
Remains of South Fork Dam showing construction details of the dam as it appeared in 1980

High above the city, the Commonwealth of Pennsylvania built the earthenwork South Fork Dam between 1838 and 1853 as part of a cross-state canal system, the Main Line of Public Works. Johnstown was the eastern terminus of the Western Division Canal, supplied with water by Lake Conemaugh, the reservoir behind the dam.

As railroads superseded canal barge transport, the Commonwealth abandoned the canal and sold it to the Pennsylvania Railroad. The dam and lake were part of the purchase, and the railroad sold them to private interests.

Henry Clay Frick led a group of Pittsburgh speculators, including Benjamin Ruff, to purchase the abandoned reservoir, modify it, and convert it into a private resort lake as a property for their wealthy associates. Many were connected to Carnegie Steel through business and social ties.

Development included lowering the dam to widen its top enough to accommodate a carriageway and installing a fish screen in the spillway. Workers lowered the dam, which had been 72 feet (22 m) high, by 3 feet (0.91 m). These alterations are thought to have increased the vulnerability of the dam. A system of relief pipes and valves was not replaced, a feature of the original dam that had previously been sold off for scrap. The club had no way to lower the lake's water level in an emergency.

The Pittsburgh speculators built cottages and a clubhouse to create the South Fork Fishing and Hunting Club, an exclusive and private mountain retreat. Membership grew to include more than fifty wealthy steel, coal, and railroad industrialists.

Lake Conemaugh at the club's site was 450 feet (140 m) in elevation above Johnstown. The lake was about 2 miles (3.2 km) long, about 1 mile (1.6 km) wide, and 60 feet (18 m) deep near the dam. The dam was 69 feet (21 m) high and 931 feet (284 m) long.

== Events of the flood ==
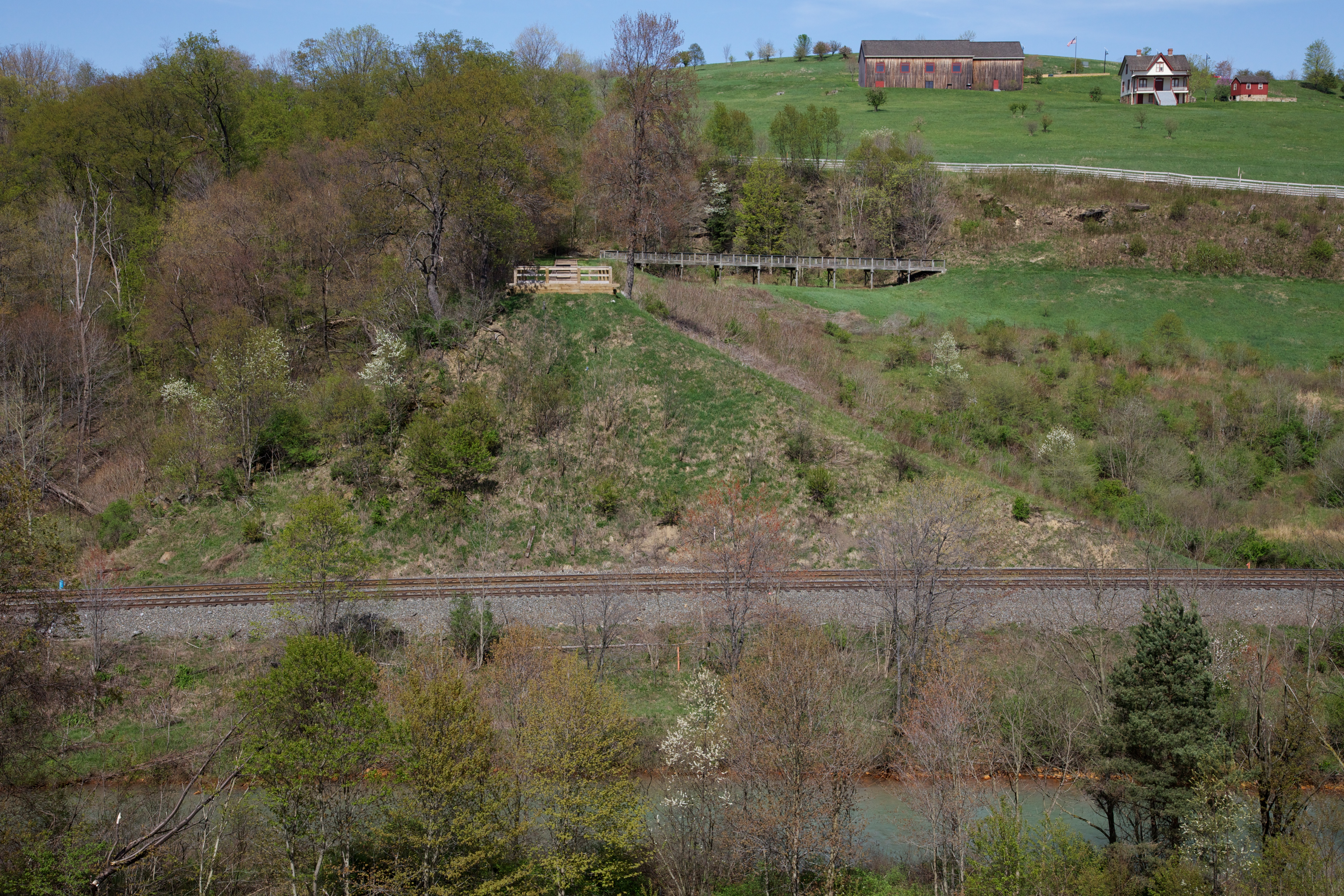
The north end of the dam abutment and the farm of Elias Unger, now the visitor center of the Johnstown Flood Museum

View of the lake bed from top of the dam

May 1889 view of the broken dam from the roadway

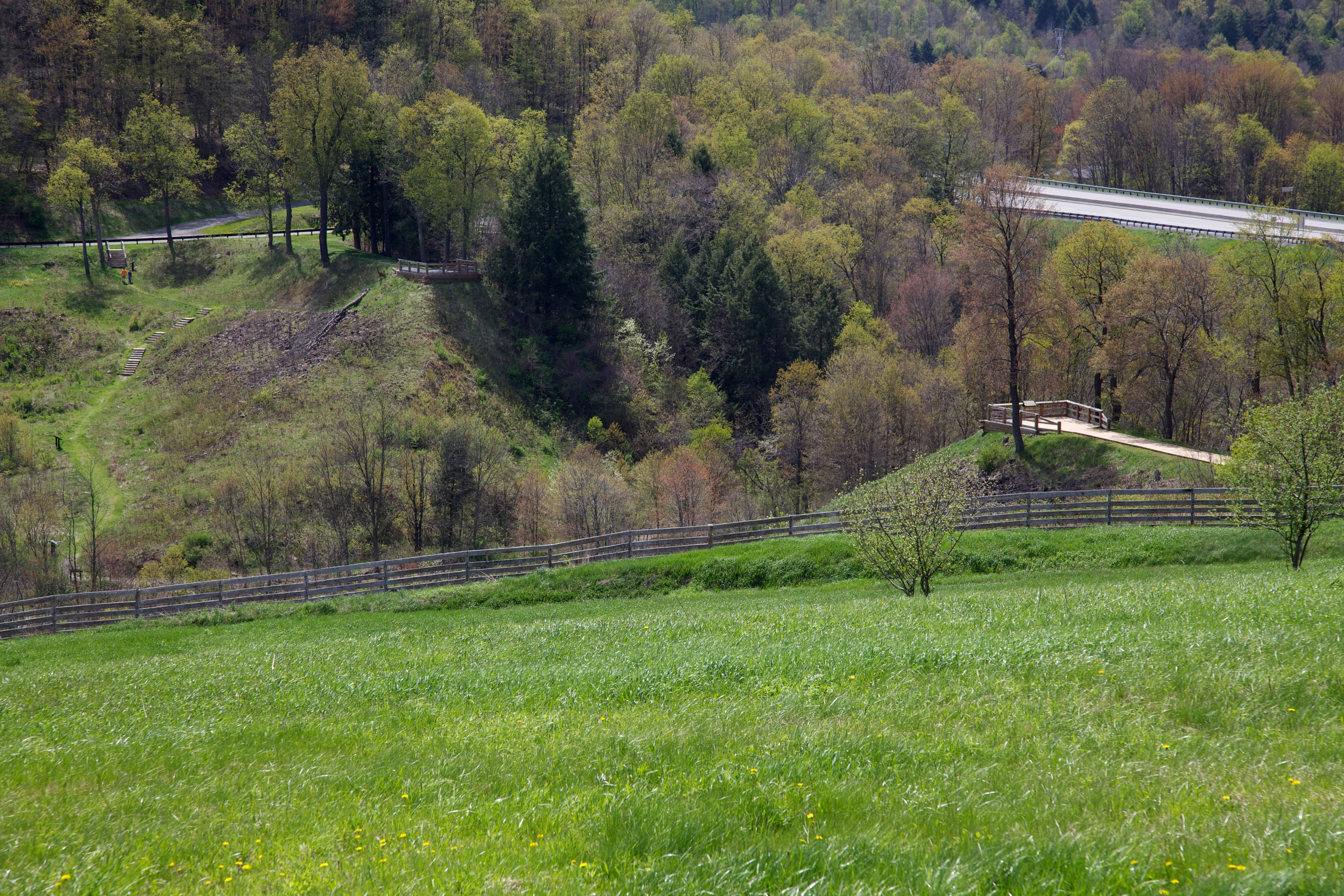
May 5, 2013 view of the center section of the dam that gave way

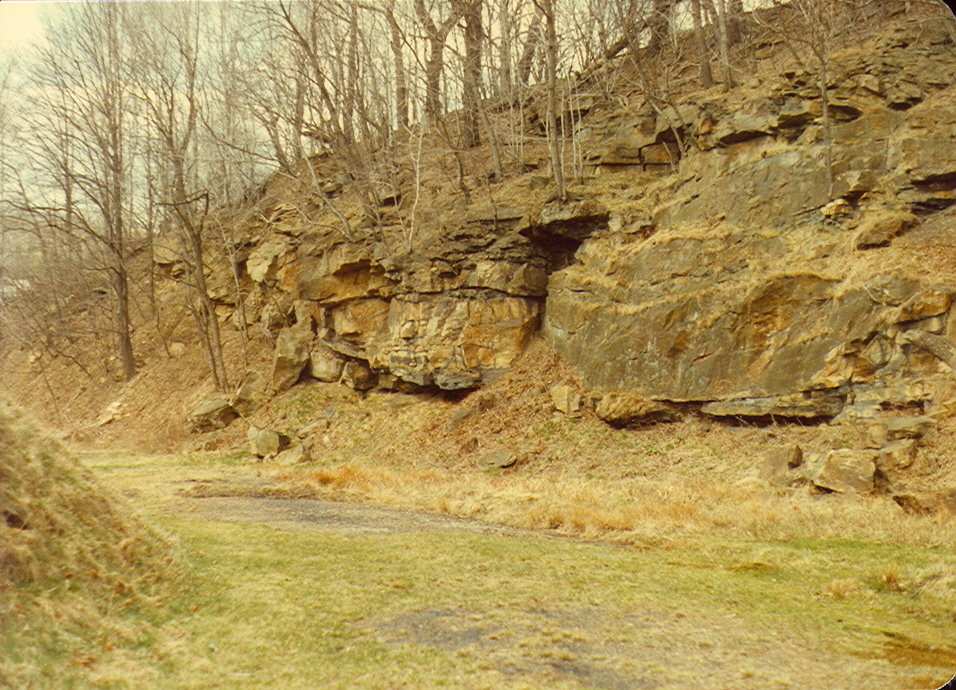
Lake Conemaugh's spillway as it appeared in 1980

Wreck of Pullman cars and engines at Conemaugh

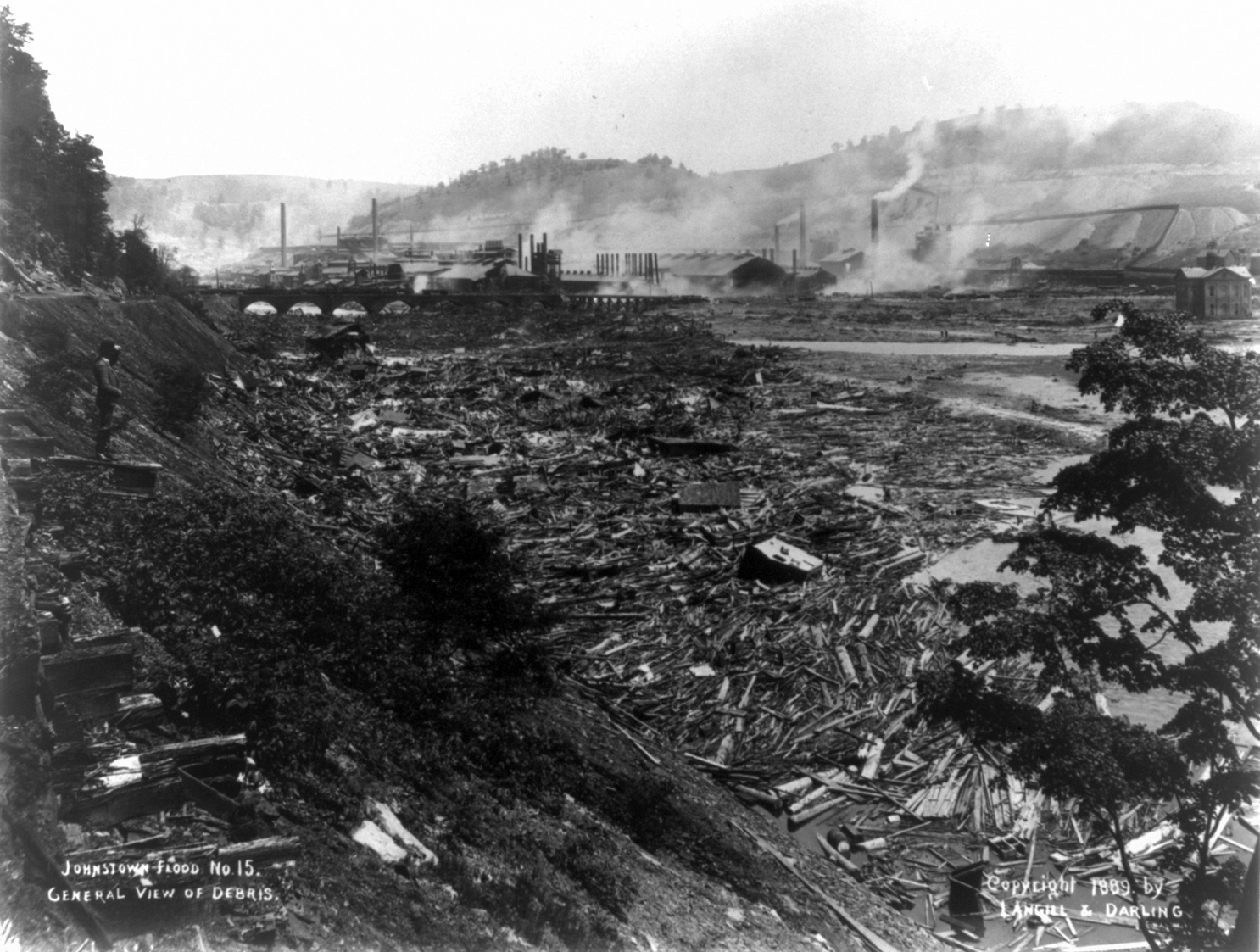
1889 view of debris field with Stone Bridge in the left center

On May 28, 1889, a low-pressure area formed over Nebraska and Kansas. By the time this weather pattern reached western Pennsylvania two days later, it had developed into what would be termed the heaviest rainfall event ever recorded in that part of the United States. The U.S. Army Signal Corps estimated that 6 to 10 inches (150 to 250 mm) of rain fell in 24 hours over the region. During the night of May 30, small creeks became roaring torrents, ripping out trees and debris. Telegraph lines were downed, and rail lines were washed away. Before daybreak, the Little Conemaugh River and Stoney Creek, which form the main stem of the Conemaugh River at their confluence in Johnstown, were threatening to overtop their banks.

On the morning of May 31, in a farmhouse on a hill just above the South Fork Dam, Elias Unger, president of the South Fork Fishing and Hunting Club, awoke to the sight of Lake Conemaugh swollen after a night-long heavy rainfall. Unger ran outside in the still-pouring rain to assess the situation and saw that the water was nearly cresting the dam. He quickly assembled a group of men to save the face of the dam by trying to unclog the spillway, where an iron grate and a broken fish trap had become obstructed with debris from the swollen waterline. Other men tried digging a ditch at the other end of the dam, on the western abutment, which was lower than the dam crest. The idea was to release more water from the lake to prevent overtopping at the crest in the center, where the dam was structurally weakest, but the effort was unsuccessful. Most men remained on top of the dam, some plowing earth to raise the crest above the water, while others tried to pile mud and rock on the face to save the eroding wall.

John Parke, an engineer for the South Fork Club, briefly considered cutting through the dam's end near the abutments, where the pressure would be lower, to create another spillway, but eventually decided against it, as doing so would have quickly ensured the dam's failure. Twice, under orders from Unger, Parke rode on horseback to a telegraph office in the nearby town of South Fork to send warnings to Johnstown explaining the dangerous situation unfolding at the dam. Parke did not personally take a warning message to the telegraph tower – he sent a man instead. The warnings were not passed to the authorities in Johnstown, however, as there had been many false alarms in the past of the dam not holding against flooding, and most people felt the danger was not serious enough to warrant urgent delivery of the messages. Unger, Parke, and the rest of the men continued working until exhaustion to save the face of the dam; they abandoned their efforts around 1:30 pm, fearing their efforts were futile and recognizing the dam was at risk of imminent collapse. Unger ordered all of his men to fall back to high ground on both sides of the dam where they could do nothing but watch and wait. During the day in Johnstown, the situation worsened as water levels rose to as high as ten feet (3.0 metres). in the streets, trapping some people in their houses.

Between 2:50 and 2:55 pm the South Fork Dam breached. LIDAR analysis of the Lake Conemaugh basin reveals that it contained 14.55 million cubic meters (3.843 billion gallons) of water at the moment the dam collapsed. Witnesses reported that the lake took only 35–45 minutes to empty completely after the dam began to fail, though modern dam-breach computer modeling reveals that it likely took approximately 65 minutes for most of the lake to empty. The first town to be hit by the flood was South Fork, immediately downstream; the town was on high ground, and most of the people escaped by running up the nearby hills when they saw the dam spill over. Between twenty and thirty houses were destroyed or washed away, and four people were killed.

Continuing downstream to Johnstown, 14 miles (23 km) by river to the west, the water picked up debris such as trees, houses, and animals. At the Conemaugh Viaduct, a 78-foot-high (24 m) railroad bridge, the flood was momentarily stemmed when debris jammed against the stone bridge's arch. But within seven minutes, the viaduct collapsed, allowing the flood to resume its course. Owing to the delay at the stone arch, the floodwaters gained additional hydraulic head, resulting in a stronger, more abrupt wave of water hitting places downstream than would otherwise have been expected. The small town of Mineral Point, one mile (1.6 km) below the viaduct, was the first populated place to be hit with this renewed force. About thirty families lived on the village's single street. After the flood, there were no structures, no topsoil, no subsoil in Mineral Point – only the bedrock was left. The death toll here was approximately sixteen people. In 2009, studies showed that the flood's flow rate through the narrow valley exceeded 420,000 cubic feet per second (12,000 m^{3}/s), comparable to the flow rate of the Mississippi River at its delta, which varies between 250,000 and 710,000 cu ft/s (7,000 and 20,000 m^{3}/s).

The village of East Conemaugh was the next populated area to fall victim to the flood. One witness on high ground near the town described the water as almost obscured by debris, resembling "a huge hill rolling over and over". From his idle locomotive in the town's railyard, engineer John Hess heard and felt the rumbling of the approaching flood. Throwing his locomotive into reverse, he raced backward toward East Conemaugh, the whistle blowing constantly. His warning saved many people who reached high ground. When the flood hit, it picked up the still-moving locomotive off the tracks and floated it aside; Hess himself survived, but at least fifty people died, including about twenty-five passengers stranded on trains in the village.

Just before reaching the main part of Johnstown, the flood surge hit the Cambria Iron Works in the town of Woodvale, sweeping up railroad cars and barbed wire. One survivor from Cambria City described the moment the rush hit: "In 15 minutes the water rose 10 feet, and in five minutes more I am sure 50 houses came floating down the streets. There were people in every one of them, and God only knows how many were lost." He described the houses jamming together and being battered to pieces before carrying far, and recalled that when he looked back from the flood, "where Cambria City stood there was nothing but a great lake of water." Of Woodvale's 1,100 residents, 314 died in the flood. Boilers exploded when the flood hit the Gautier Wire Works, sending black smoke visible to Johnstown residents. Miles of barbed wire became entangled with the rest of the debris in the flood waters.

Fifty-seven minutes after the dam collapsed, the flood reached Johnstown. Residents were caught by surprise as the wall of water and debris bore down, traveling at 40 miles per hour (64 km/h) and reaching 60 feet (18 m) in places. Some people, realizing the danger, tried to escape by running to high ground, but most were swept away by the surging floodwaters in their homes and workplaces. Many people were crushed by pieces of debris, and others became caught in barbed wire from the wire factory upstream. Those who reached the attics or roofs, or managed to stay afloat on floating debris, waited for hours for help to arrive.

The Stone Bridge, a substantial arched structure, carried the Pennsylvania Railroad across the Conemaugh River in the center of Johnstown. The debris carried by the flood, now including twisted steel rails, boxcars, entire buildings, and the bodies of the flood's victims, formed a temporary dam at the bridge, forcing the flood surge to roll upstream along the Stoney Creek River channel. Eventually, gravity caused the surge to return to the dam, resulting in a second wave that hit the city from a different direction. Some people who had been washed downstream became trapped in an inferno as the debris that had piled up against the bridge caught fire; at least eighty people died there. The fire burned for three days. After floodwaters receded, the pile of debris at the bridge was seen to cover 30 acres (12 ha), and reached 70 feet (21 m) in height. It took workers three months to remove the mass of debris, the delay owing in part to the large quantity of barbed wire from the ironworks that was entangled with the wreckage. Dynamite was eventually used.

== Survivor accounts ==
Contemporary accounts documented both miraculous escapes and scenes of devastating loss. Attorney James M. Walters of Walnut Street described riding his own house down the flooded streets until it struck Alma Hall, throwing him into his second-floor office; he found some 200 survivors sheltering in the hall's upper floors. The group organized itself in the total darkness. Walters was elected president, and Dr. Matthews managed the upper floors despite having several ribs crushed by a falling timber. Two women gave premature birth during the night; Walters reported that women and children surrendered their lives the following day from terror and fatigue.

Among the scenes recorded in the days after the flood: William Varner lost six of his children while saving an eighteen-month-old infant, his wife having died just three weeks before the disaster. An elderly German man and his wife floated on their house to a point below Ninevah. Their five daughters drowned, while the couple clung to a tree for twenty-four hours before they could be taken down. One of the most affecting sights reported was a young woman pulled from the Conemaugh River, her clothing nearly entirely torn away, found clasping a baby boy of about a year old tightly to her chest, with the child's face raised to her lips as in a final kiss. The family of George J. Leas of Iron Street survived when their floating house lodged against the drift at the stone bridge after nearly half an hour adrift, allowing all eight people on the roof to escape.

== Victims ==
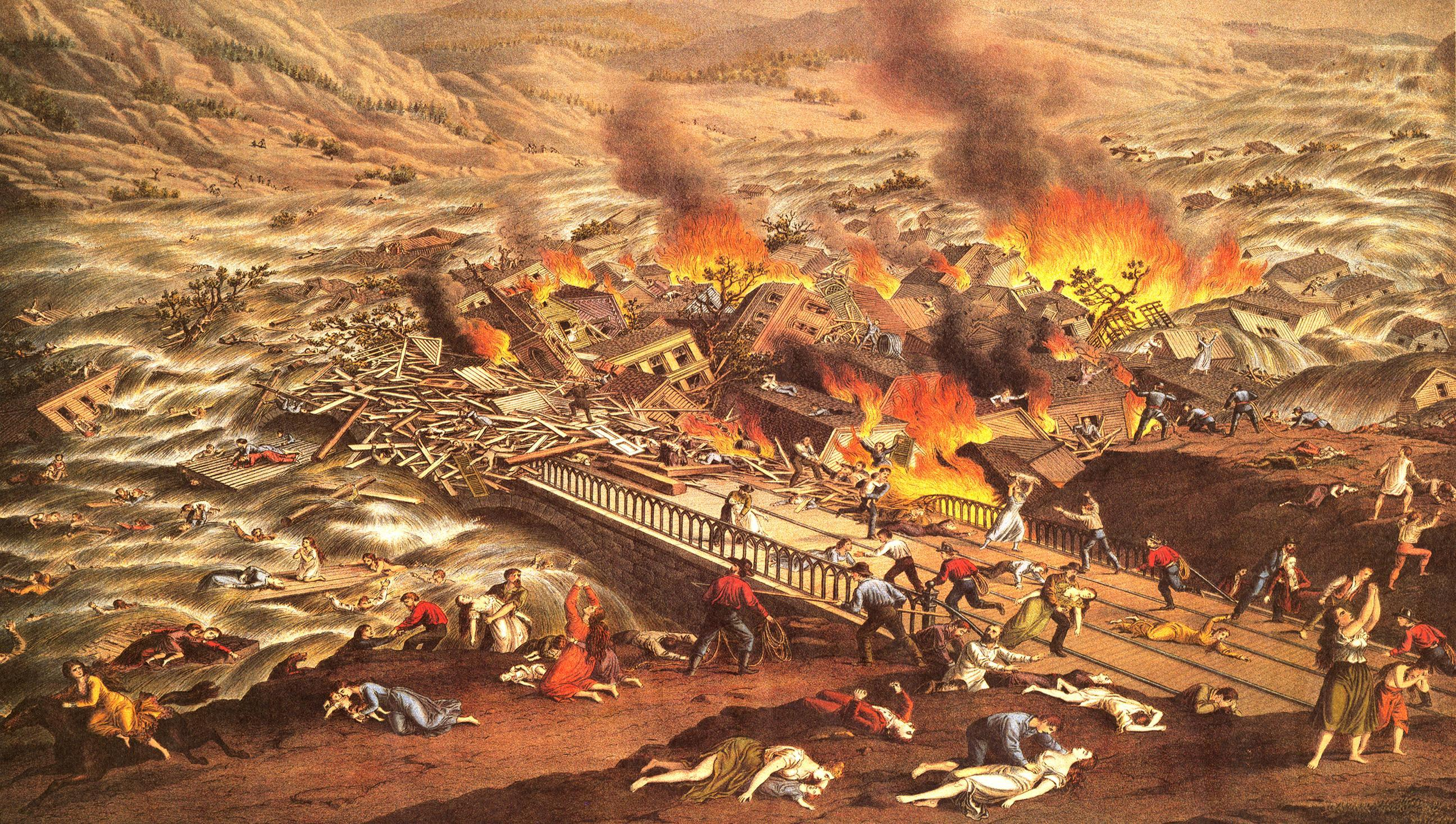
A contemporary rendition of the Johnstown Flood scene at the Stone Bridge by Kurz and Allison (1890)

The total death toll from the flood was calculated originally as 2,209 people, making the disaster the largest loss of civilian life in the United States at the time. This number of deaths was later surpassed by fatalities in the 1900 Galveston hurricane and the September 11 attacks. However, as pointed out by historian David McCullough, a man reported as presumed dead had survived; Leroy Temple returned to Johnstown 11 years after the disaster and revealed he had extricated himself from the flood debris at the Stone Bridge, walked out of the valley, and moved to Beverly, Massachusetts. After the revelation of Temple's survival, the official death toll was 2,208.

According to records compiled by the Johnstown Area Heritage Association, bodies were found as far away as Cincinnati, Ohio, and as late as 1911; 99 entire families died in the flood, including 396 children; 124 women and 198 men were widowed; 98 children were orphaned; and one third of the dead, 777 people, never were identified; their remains were buried at Johnstown's Grandview Cemetery.

== Investigation ==
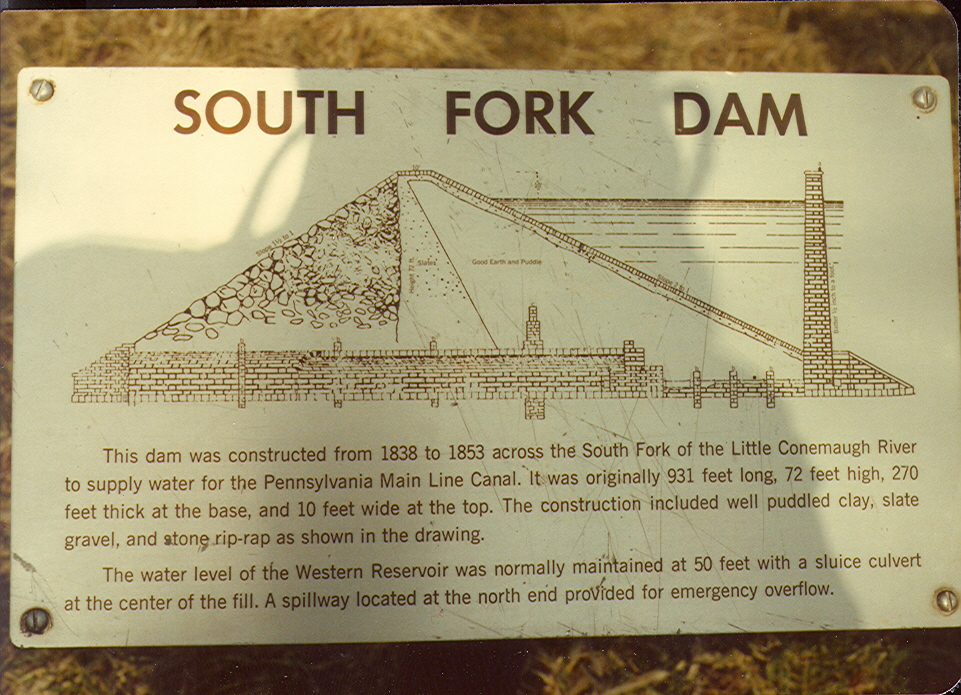
South Fork Dam legend showing construction details of the dam

On June 5, 1889, five days after the flood, the American Society of Civil Engineers (ASCE) appointed a committee of four prominent engineers to investigate the cause of the disaster. The committee was led by the esteemed James B. Francis, a hydraulic engineer best known for his work related to canals, flood control, turbine design, dam construction, and hydraulic calculations. Francis was a founding member of the ASCE and served as its president from November 1880 to January 1882. The committee visited the site of the South Fork Dam, reviewed the original engineering design of the dam and modifications made during repairs, interviewed eyewitnesses, commissioned a topographic survey of the dam remnants, and performed hydrologic calculations.

The ASCE committee completed its investigation report on January 15, 1890, but its final report was sealed and not shared with other ASCE members or the public. At ASCE's annual convention in June 1890, committee member Max Becker was quoted as saying, "We will hardly [publish our investigation] report this session, unless pressed to do so, as we do not want to become involved in any litigation." Although many ASCE members clamored for the report, it was not published in the society's transactions until two years after the disaster, in June 1891. William Shinn, a former partner of industrialist Andrew Carnegie, became the new president of ASCE in January 1890. He gave the investigation report to outgoing Becker to decide when to release it to the public. Becker kept it under wraps until the time of ASCE's convention in Chattanooga, Tennessee, in 1890. The long-awaited report was presented at that meeting by James Francis. The other three investigators, William Worthen, Alphonse Fteley, and Max Becker, did not attend.

In its final report, the ASCE committee concluded the dam would have failed even if it had been maintained within the original design specifications, i.e., with a higher embankment crest and with five large discharge pipes at the dam's base. This claim has since been challenged. A hydraulic analysis published in 2016 confirmed that the changes made to the dam by the South Fork Fishing and Hunting Club severely reduced its ability to withstand major storms. Lowering the dam by as much as 3 feet (0.91 m) and failing to replace the discharge pipes at its base cut the dam's safe discharge capacity in half. This lowering of the dam greatly reduced the capacity of the main spillway and virtually eliminated the action of an emergency spillway on the western abutment. Walter Frank first documented the presence of that emergency spillway in a 1988 ASCE publication. Its existence is supported by topographic data from 1889 which shows the western abutment to be about one foot lower than the crest of the dam remnants, even after the dam had previously been lowered as much as three feet by the South Fork Club. Adding the width of the emergency spillway to that of the main spillway yielded the total width of spillway capacity that had been specified in the 1847 design of William Morris, a state engineer.

== Legal ==
In the years following the disaster, some survivors blamed members of the South Fork Fishing and Hunting Club for their modifications to the dam, which lowered its level and gradually blocked its spillway. They were also accused of failing to maintain the dam properly, so that it was unable to contain the additional water of the unusually heavy rainfall.

The club was successfully defended in court by the firm of Knox and Reed (later Reed Smith LLP), whose partners Philander Knox and James Hay Reed were both club members. Knox and Reed successfully argued that the dam's failure was a natural disaster, an Act of God. No legal compensation was ever paid to the survivors of the flood.

Neither the club nor its members were ever held legally responsible for the disaster. This perceived injustice is considered to have aided the acceptance, in later cases, of a new definition of "strict, joint, and several liability," so that even a "non-negligent defendant could be held liable for damage caused by the unnatural use of land."

Individual members of the South Fork Club, millionaires in their day, contributed to the recovery in Johnstown. Along with about half of the club members, co-founder Henry Clay Frick donated thousands of dollars to the relief effort. After the flood, Andrew Carnegie built the town a new library.

Popular feeling ran high, as is reflected in Isaac G. Reed's poem:

Many thousand human lives-
Butchered husbands, slaughtered wives
Mangled daughters, bleeding sons,
Hosts of martyred little ones,
(Worse than Herod's awful crime)
Sent to heaven before their time;
Lovers burnt and sweethearts drowned,
Darlings lost but never found!
All the horrors that hell could wish,
Such was the price that was paid for— fish!

== Aftermath ==
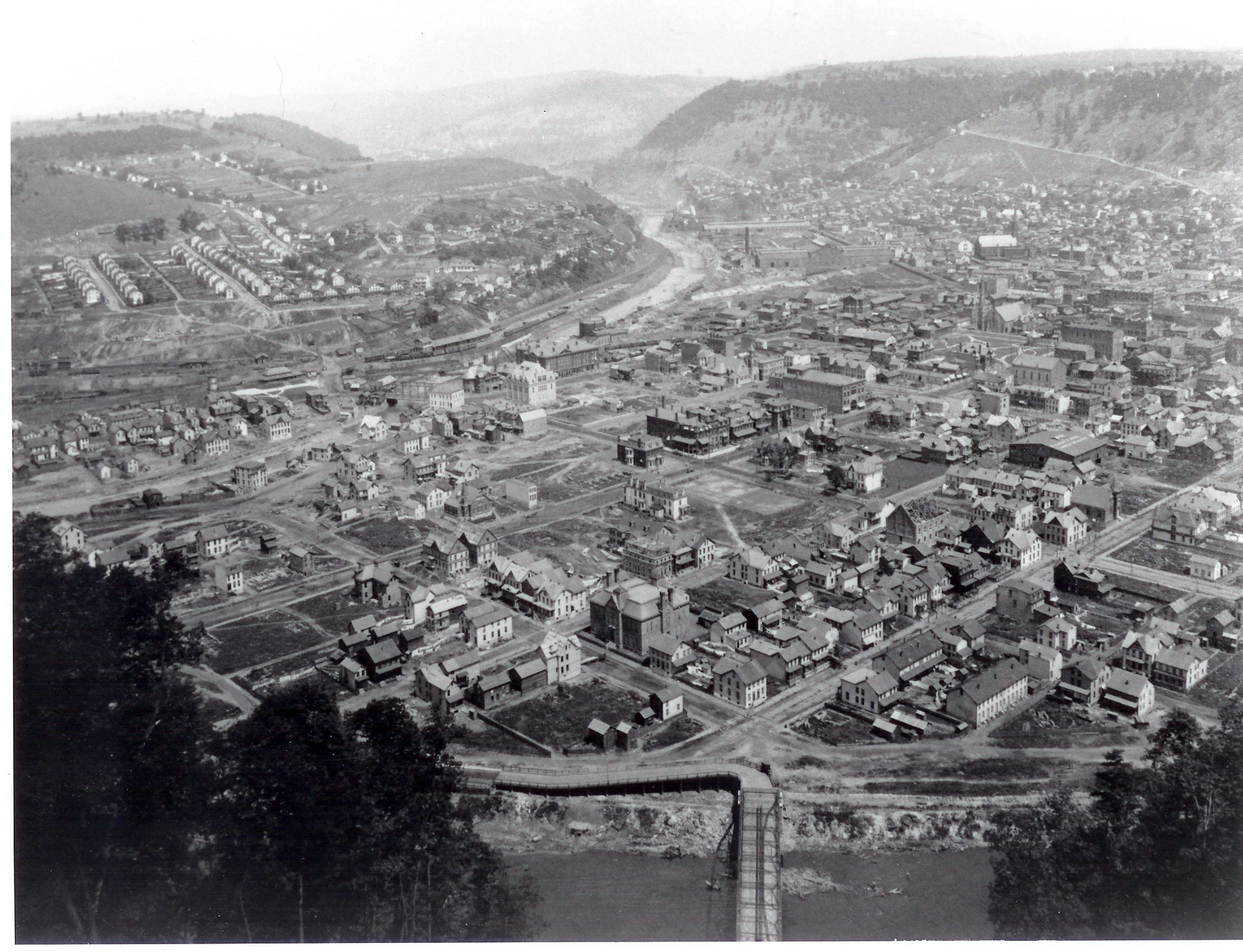
1889 view of Johnstown, Pennsylvania, several months after the Great Flood

The Johnstown Flood was the worst flood to hit the United States in the 19th century, and to date, the worst natural disaster to strike Pennsylvania. 1,600 homes were destroyed, at an estimated total cost of US$17 million (equivalent to $551 million in 2025), and 4 square miles (10 km^{2}) of downtown Johnstown were completely destroyed. Debris at the Stone Bridge covered thirty acres, and clean-up operations were to continue for years. Cambria Iron and Steel's facilities were heavily damaged; they returned to full production within 18 months.

Working seven days and nights, workmen built a wooden trestle bridge to temporarily replace the Conemaugh Viaduct, which had been destroyed by the flood. The Pennsylvania Railroad restored service to Pittsburgh, 55 miles (89 km) away, by June 2. Food, clothing, medicine, and other provisions began arriving by rail. Morticians traveled by railroad. Johnstown's first call for help requested coffins and undertakers. The demolition expert "Dynamite Bill" Flinn and his 900-man crew cleared the wreckage at the Stone Bridge. They carted off debris, distributed food, and erected temporary housing. At its peak, the army of relief workers totaled about 7,000.

One of the first outsiders to arrive was Clara Barton, the founder and president of the American Red Cross. Barton arrived on June 5, 1889, to lead the group's first major disaster relief effort; she did not leave for more than five months. Donations for the relief effort came from all over the U.S. and overseas. $3,742,818.78 was collected for the Johnstown relief effort from within the U.S. and 18 foreign countries, including Russia, France, Germany, Great Britain, Australia, and the Ottoman Empire.

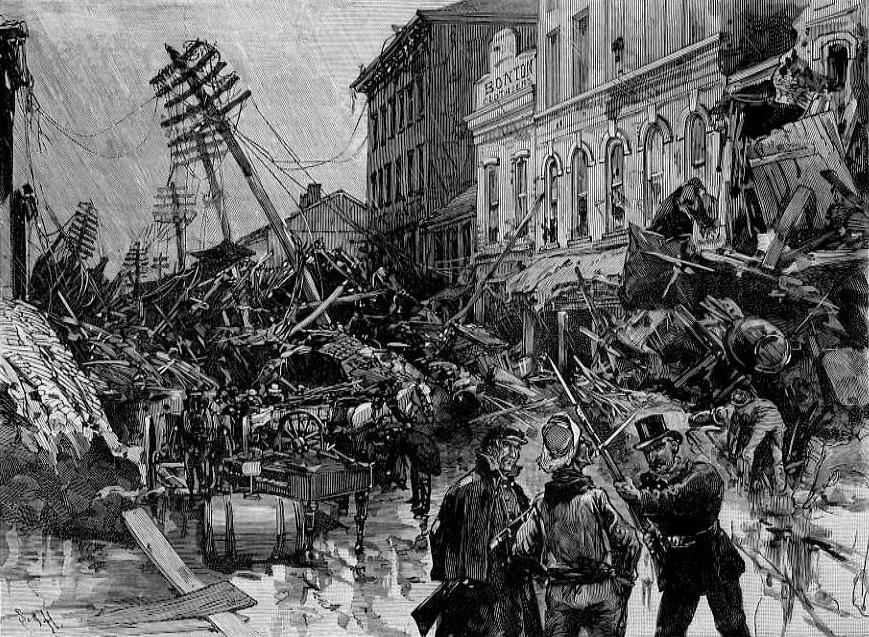
Authorities averting looting on Main Street, as depicted in a June 15, 1889, illustration in Harper's Weekly (This was shown satirically in the 1978 book MAD Goes to Pieces as "The morning after the final concert of The Who.")

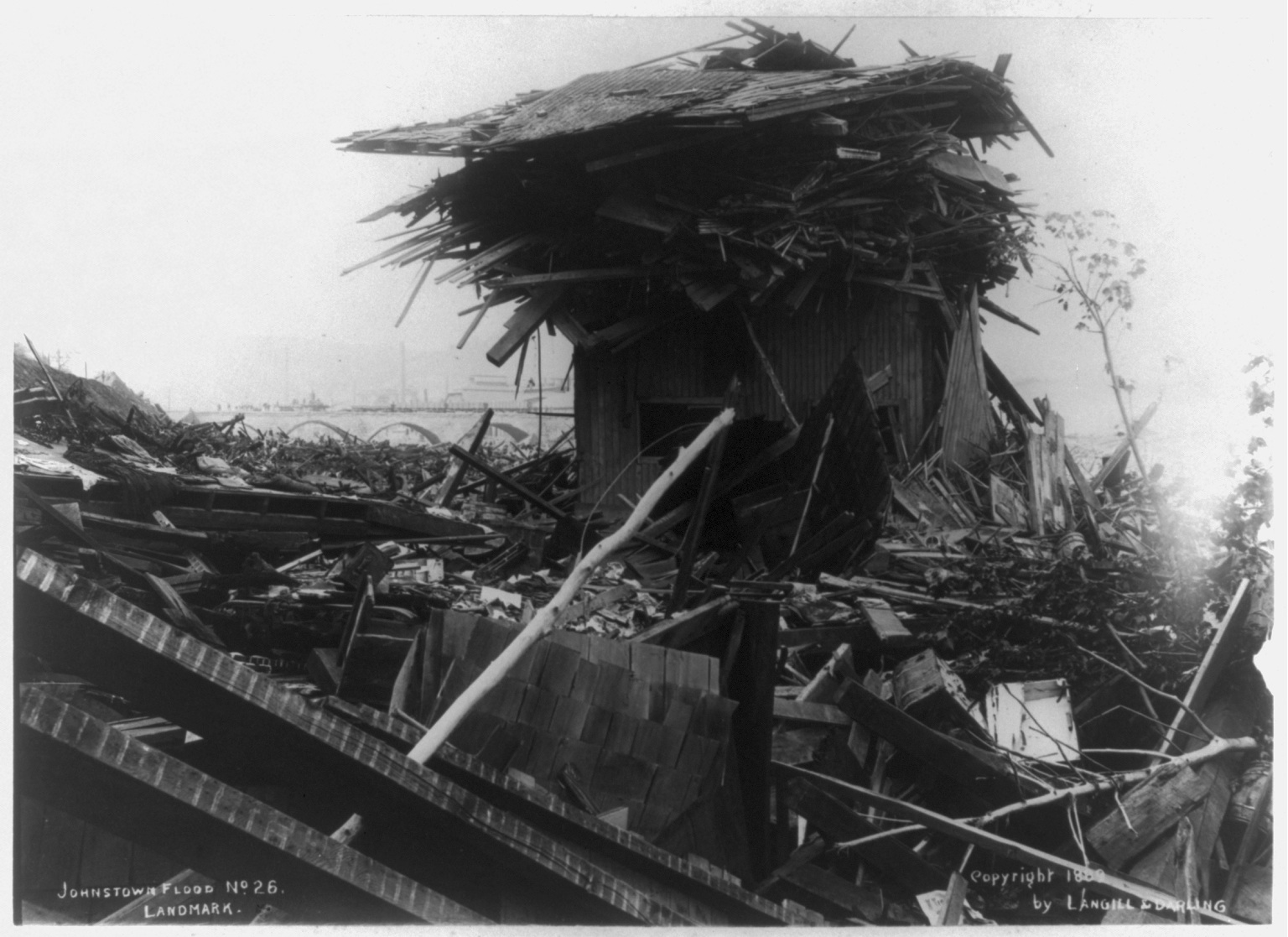
A house almost completely destroyed in the flood

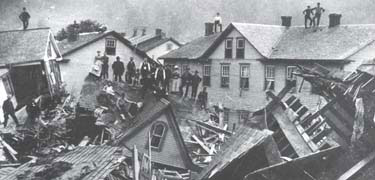
View of lower Johnstown three days after the flood

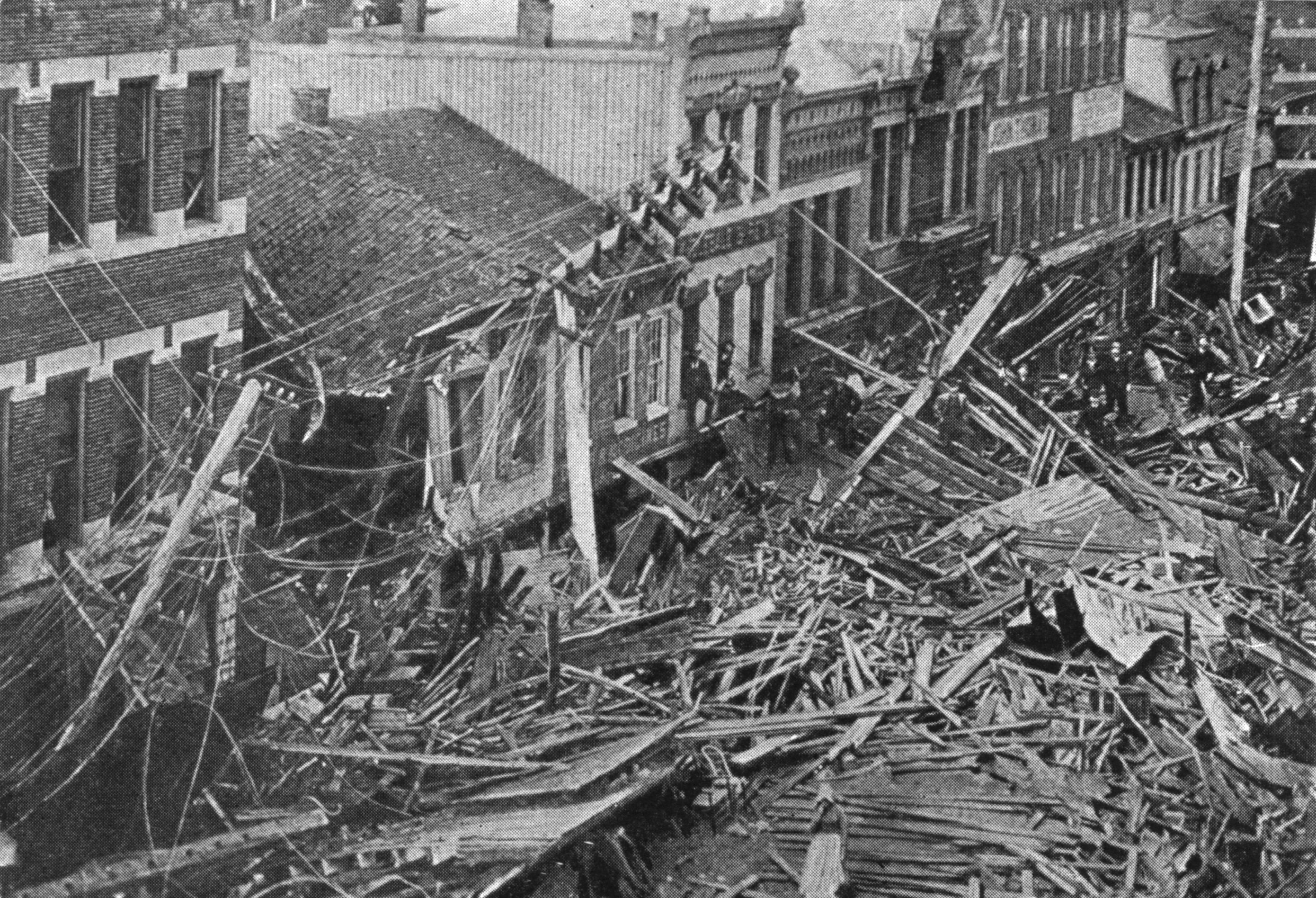
Main Street after flood

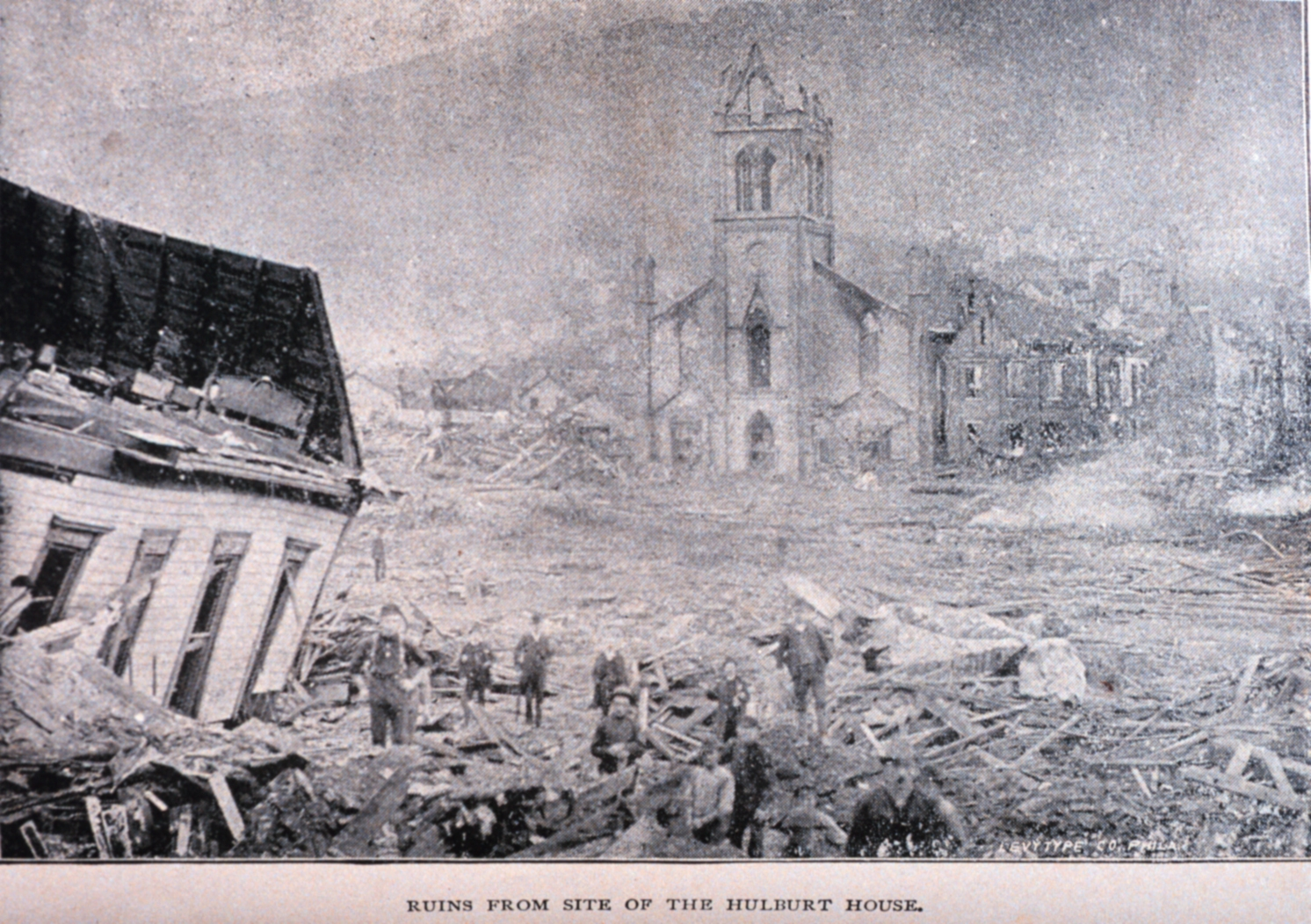
Ruins of the Hulbert House

=== Subsequent floods ===
Flooding has continued to be a concern for Johnstown, which experienced major floods in 1894, 1907, 1924, 1936, and 1977. The biggest flood of the first half of the 20th century was the St. Patrick's Day flood of March 1936. That flood also reached Pittsburgh, where it was known as the Pittsburgh Flood of 1936. Following the 1936 flood, the United States Army Corps of Engineers dredged the Conemaugh River within the city and built concrete river walls, creating a channel nearly 20 feet (6.1 m) deep. Upon completion, the Corps proclaimed Johnstown "flood free".

The new river walls withstood Hurricane Agnes in 1972, but on the night of 19 July 1977, a severe thunderstorm dropped 11 inches (28 cm) of rain in eight hours on the watershed above the city and the rivers began to rise. By dawn, the city was underwater, with water reaching as high as 8 feet (2.4 m). Seven counties were declared a disaster area, suffering $200 million in property damage, and 78 people died. Forty were killed by the Laurel Run Dam failure. Another 50,000 were rendered homeless by this 100-year flood. Markers on a corner of City Hall at 401 Main Street show the height of the crests of the 1889, 1936, and 1977 floods.

== Legacy ==
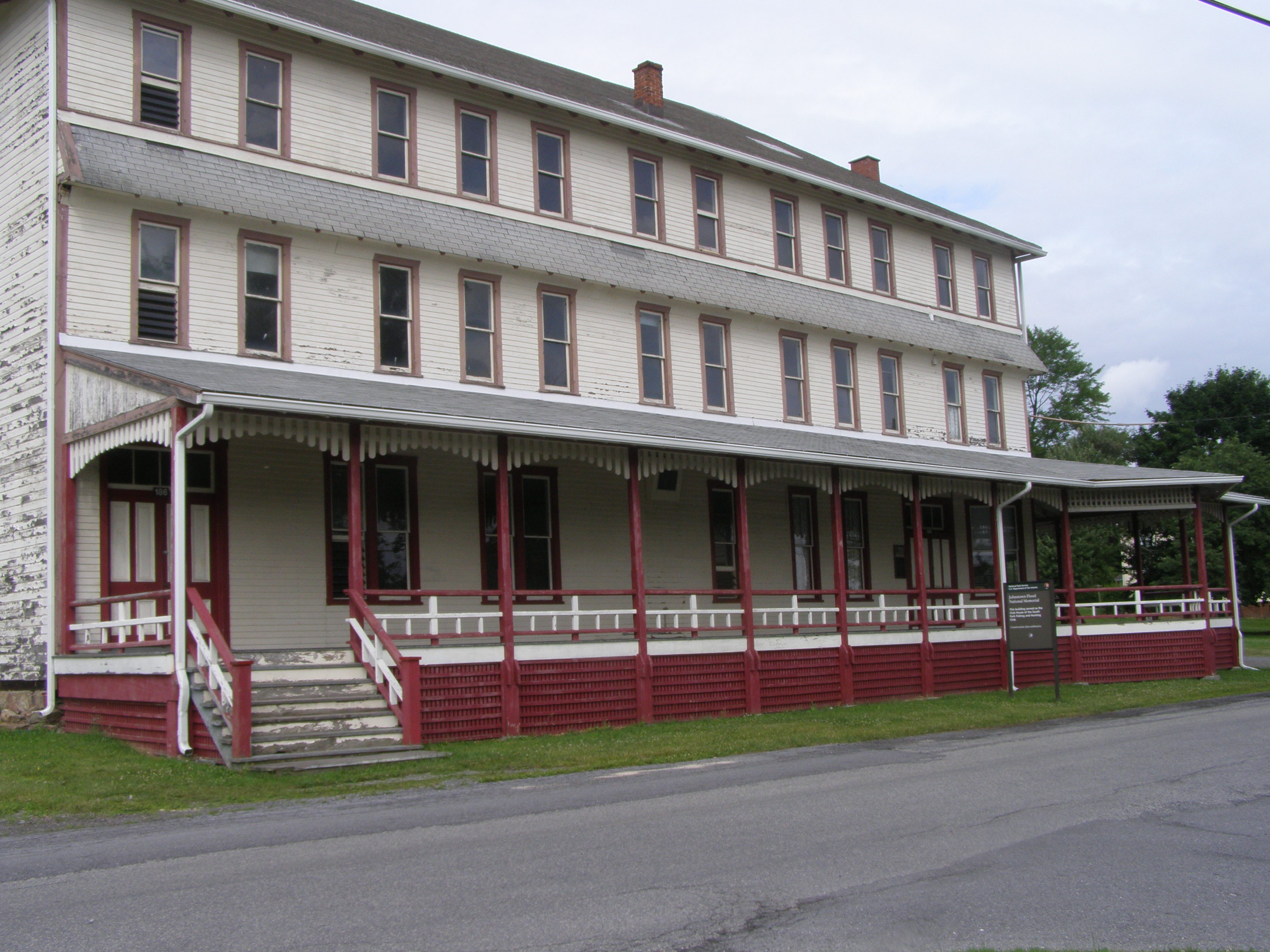
The former South Fork Fishing and Hunting Club, now the Johnstown Flood National Memorial

By loss of life it was the worst flash flood in U.S. history.

At Point Park in Johnstown, at the confluence of the Stonycreek and Little Conemaugh rivers, an eternal flame burns in memory of the flood victims.

The Carnegie Library in Johnstown is now operated by the Johnstown Area Heritage Association. It has adapted it for use as the Johnstown Flood Museum.

Portions of the Stone Bridge have been made part of the Johnstown Flood National Memorial. This includes a park established in 1969 and managed by the National Park Service. In 2008, the bridge was restored as part of a project that included new lighting, as part of commemorative activities related to the flood.

Supporters of the memorial also believed it was important to gain control of the remaining buildings and property of the former South Fork Fishing and Hunting Club to ensure full interpretation. The area and contributing buildings were designated as the National Historic Landmark District in 1986 and added to the National Register of Historic Places. It is also administered by the National Park Service.

Combined with the failure of the Walnut Grove Dam less than a year later, the Flood brought national attention to the issue of dam safety.

=== Effect on the development of American law ===
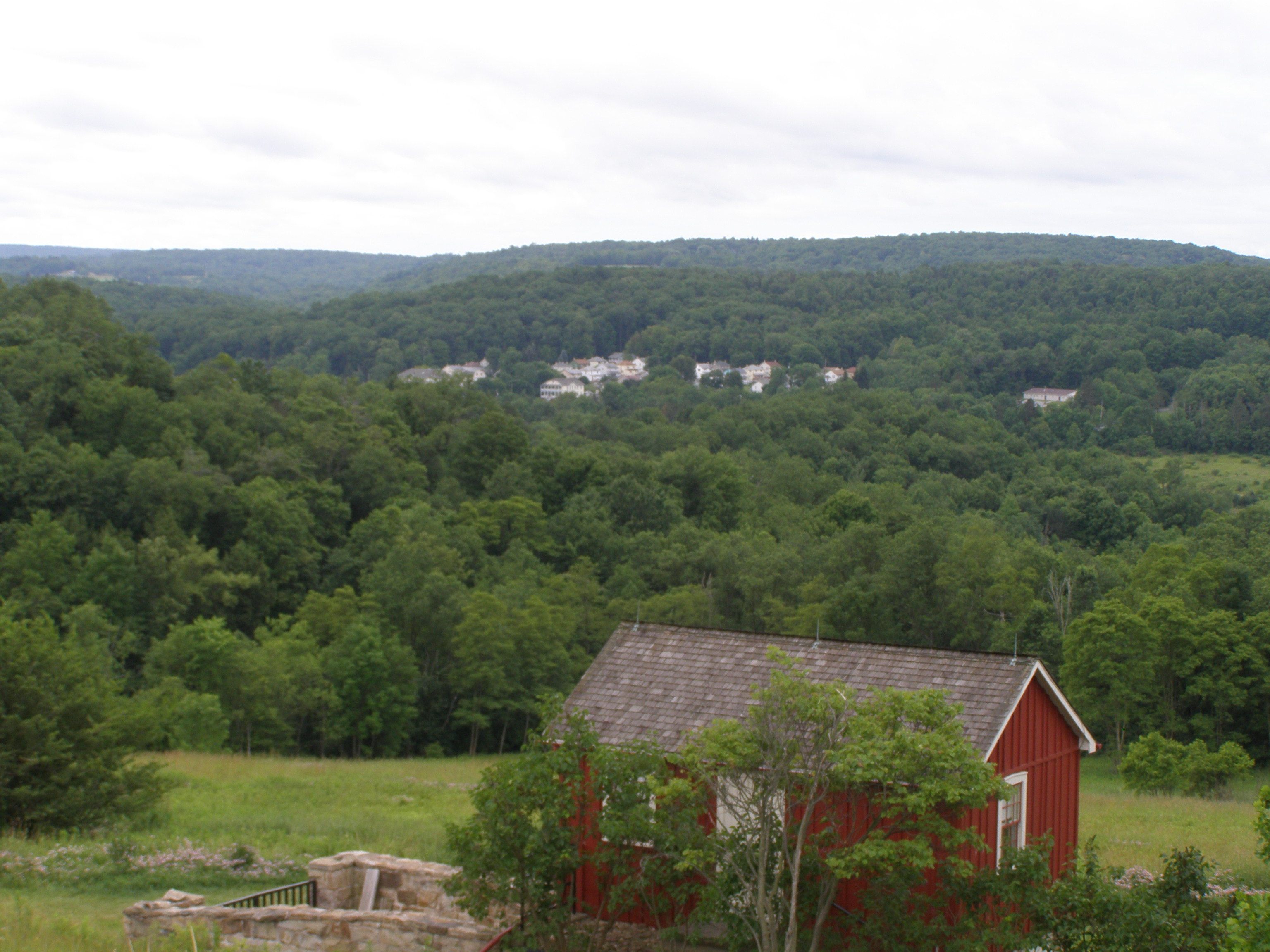
Location of the South Fork Reservoir at Johnstown Flood National Memorial in Johnstown, Pennsylvania

Survivors of the flood were unable to recover damages in court because it was difficult for any suit to prove that any of the South Fork Club's owners had behaved negligently. This failure of survivors' suits against the club led to coverage and extensive criticism in the national press. As a result of this criticism, in the 1890s, state courts around the country adopted Rylands v. Fletcher, a British common law precedent which had formerly been largely ignored in the United States. State courts' adoption of Rylands, which held that a non-negligent defendant could be held liable for damage caused by the unnatural use of land, foreshadowed the legal system's 20th-century acceptance of strict liability.

== Depiction in media ==
=== Film and television ===
- The Johnstown Flood, a 1926 American silent epic film directed by Irving Cummings and starring Janet Gaynor. A print is held at George Eastman House.
- The Johnstown Flood, a 1946 animated film. Mighty Mouse uses time-reversal power to undo the flood and prevent the dam from breaking in the first place. One of a series of cartoons where he stops disasters that actually happened.
- Slap Shot, a 1977 film was filmed in Johnstown, renamed as the fictitious "Charlestown" for the film. There are several references to an also fictitious "1938 flood," when the character Reg Dunlop (Paul Newman) refers to a statue of a dog that had warned the town of the coming flood. Radio announcer Jim Carr also refers to Charlestown's nickname, "Flood City."
- The Johnstown Flood, a 1989 short documentary film which won the Documentary Short Subject Oscar in 1990.
- The Men Who Built America - "Bloody Battles" aka "Blood Is Spilled", an episode of the 2012 miniseries docudrama.

=== Theater ===
- "A True History of the Johnstown Flood" by Rebecca Gilman.
- By the early 20th century, entertainers developed an exhibition portraying the flood, using moving scenery, light effects, and a live narrator. It was featured as a main attraction at the Stockholm Exhibition of 1909, where it was seen by 100,000 and presented as "our time's greatest electromechanical spectacle", and was probably the Johnstown Flood attraction at the 1908 Franco-British Exhibition at Shepherd's Bush, London, which was seen by 715,000 people. The stage was 82 feet (25 m) wide, and the show employed a total of 13 stagehands.

=== Music ===
- "Mother Country", written by singer-songwriter John Stewart in 1969, contains the lyrics "What ever happened to those faces in the old photographs / I mean, the little boys / Boys? Hell they were men / Who stood knee deep in the Johnstown mud / In the time of that terrible flood / And they listened to the water, that awful noise / And then they put away the dreams that belonged to little boys."
- "Highway Patrolman", a track from Bruce Springsteen's 1982 album Nebraska, mentions a (fictional) song titled "Night of the Johnstown Flood".

=== Literature ===
==== Poems ====
- "The Pennsylvania Disaster," a poem by William McGonagall
- "By the Conemaugh", a poem by Florence Earle Coates.Coates, Florence Earle (1889). Poems (1898)/By the Conemaugh – via Wikisource.
- "A Voice from Death", a poem by Walt Whitman commissioned by Joseph Pulitzer for the New York World and published on its front page for June 7, 1889. Whitman claimed to have written it in an hour and a half after being deeply moved by the reports of the impact on a working-class city.

==== Short stories ====
- Brian Booker's "A Drowning Accident", in One Story (Issue #57, May 30, 2005), was largely based on the Johnstown Flood of 1889.
- Caitlín R. Kiernan featured the flood in her "To This Water (Johnstown, Pennsylvania, 1889)", in her collected Tales of Pain and Wonder (1994).
- Donald Keith's science fiction serial Mutiny in the Time Machine was published in Boys' Life magazine beginning in Dec 1962. It involved a Boy Scout troop discovering a time machine and travelling to Johnstown just prior to the flood.
- Jim Shepard's Privilege, in Ploughshares, (Fall 2023 Issue) is a story of historical fiction based on the Johnstown Flood of 1889.

==== Historical works ====
- Willis Fletcher Johnson wrote in 1889 a book called History of the Johnstown Flood (published by Edgewood Publishing Co.), one of the first accounts of the flood published as a book.
- James Herbert Walker wrote a 40-page pamphlet in 1889 called The Johnstown Horror!!! Or Valley of Death, Being a Complete and Thrilling Account of the Awful Floods and Their Appalling Ruin. Published by the National Publishing Company, the pamphlet was being sold in New York City less than a week after the disaster and was later expanded to a book of over 400 pages.
- Gertrude Quinn Slattery, who survived the flood as a six-year-old girl, published a memoir entitled Johnstown and Its Flood in 1936.
- Historian and author David McCullough's first book was The Johnstown Flood (1968), published by Simon & Schuster.
- Weatherman and author Al Roker wrote Ruthless Tide: The Heroes and Villains of the Johnstown Flood, America's Astonishing Gilded Age Disaster.

==== In fiction ====
- Marden A. Dahlstedt wrote the young adult novel The Terrible Wave (1972), featuring a young girl as the main character.
- John Jakes featured the flood in his novel The Americans (1979), set in 1890 and the final book in the series of The Kent Family Chronicles.
- Kathleen Cambor wrote the historical novel In Sunlight, In a Beautiful Garden (2001), based on events of the flood. The book was a New York Times Notable Book of the Year.
- Peg Kehret's fantasy novel The Flood Disaster, features two students assigned a project on the flood who travel back in time.
- Murray Leinster's fantasy novel The Time Tunnel (1967) features two time travelers who were unable to warn the Johnstown population of the coming disaster.
- Colleen Coble wrote The Wedding Quilt Bride (2001), which tells the story of a romance between a member of the club's granddaughter and a man brought in to see if the dam was really in trouble. It follows him trying to convince the people of the danger and then the flood.
- Mary Hogan's The Woman in the Photo (2016) is about two young women, one in present-day America and one in Johnstown, Pennsylvania in 1889, before and during the Flood.
- The Star Trek: The Original Series novel Rough Trails (2006) (third part of the Star Trek: New Earth mini-series) by L.A. Graf recreates the Johnstown Flood set on another planet.

== See also ==
- Austin, Pennsylvania Dam Failure
- St. Francis Dam disaster
- Vajont Dam disaster

== Bibliography ==
- Chisholm, Hugh, ed. (1911). "Johnstown" . Encyclopædia Britannica. Vol. 15 (11th ed.). Cambridge University Press. p. 475.
- Coleman, Neil M. Johnstown's Flood of 1889 – Power Over Truth and the Science Behind the Disaster (2018). Springer International Publishing AG. 256 pp. 978–3-319-95215-4 978-3-319-95216-1 (eBook)
- Coleman, Neil M., Wojno, Stephanie, and Kaktins, Uldis. (2017). The Johnstown Flood of 1889 – Challenging the Findings of the ASCE Investigation Report. Paper No. 29-10. Geological Society of America Abstracts with Programs. Vol. 49, No. 2. Abstract: THE JOHNSTOWN FLOOD OF 1889 – CHALLENGING THE FINDINGS OF THE ASCE INVESTIGATION REPORT (Joint 52nd Northeastern Annual Section / 51st North-Central Annual Section Meeting - 2017). doi:10.1130/abs/2017NE-290358.
- Coleman, Neil M., Kaktins, Uldis, and Wojno, Stephanie (2016). Dam-Breach hydrology of the Johnstown flood of 1889 – challenging the findings of the 1891 investigation report, Heliyon, doi:10.1016/j.heliyon.2016.e00120
- Coleman, Neil M., Wojno, Stephanie, and Kaktins, Uldis. (2016). Dam-breach hydrology of the Johnstown Flood of 1889 – Challenging the findings of the 1891 investigation report. Paper No. 178-5. Geological Society of America Abstracts with Programs. Vol. 48, No. 7. Abstract: DAM-BREACH HYDROLOGY OF THE JOHNSTOWN FLOOD OF 1889 – CHALLENGING THE FINDINGS OF THE 1891 INVESTIGATION REPORT (GSA Annual Meeting in Denver, Colorado, USA - 2016). doi:10.1130/abs/2016AM-283665
- Coleman, Neil M., Davis Todd, C., Myers, Reed A., Kaktins, Uldis (2009). "Johnstown flood of 1889 – destruction and rebirth" (Presentation 76-9). Geological Society of America Abstracts with Programs, Vol. 41, No. 7, p. 216.
- Davis T., C., Coleman, Neil M., Meyers, Reed A., and Kaktins, Uldis (2009). A determination of peak discharge rate and water volume from the 1889 Johnstown Flood (Presentation 76-10). Geological Society of America Abstracts with Programs, Vol. 41, No. 7, p. 216.
- Kaktins, Uldis, Davis Todd, C., Wojno, S., Coleman, N.M. (2013). Revisiting the timing and events leading to and causing the Johnstown Flood of 1889. Pennsylvania History, v. 80, no. 3, 335–363.
- Johnson, Willis Fletcher. History of the Johnstown Flood (1889).
- McCullough, David. The Johnstown Flood (1968); ISBN 0-671-20714-8
- O'Connor, R. Johnstown – The Day The Dam Broke (1957)
