= Laurel Run Dam =

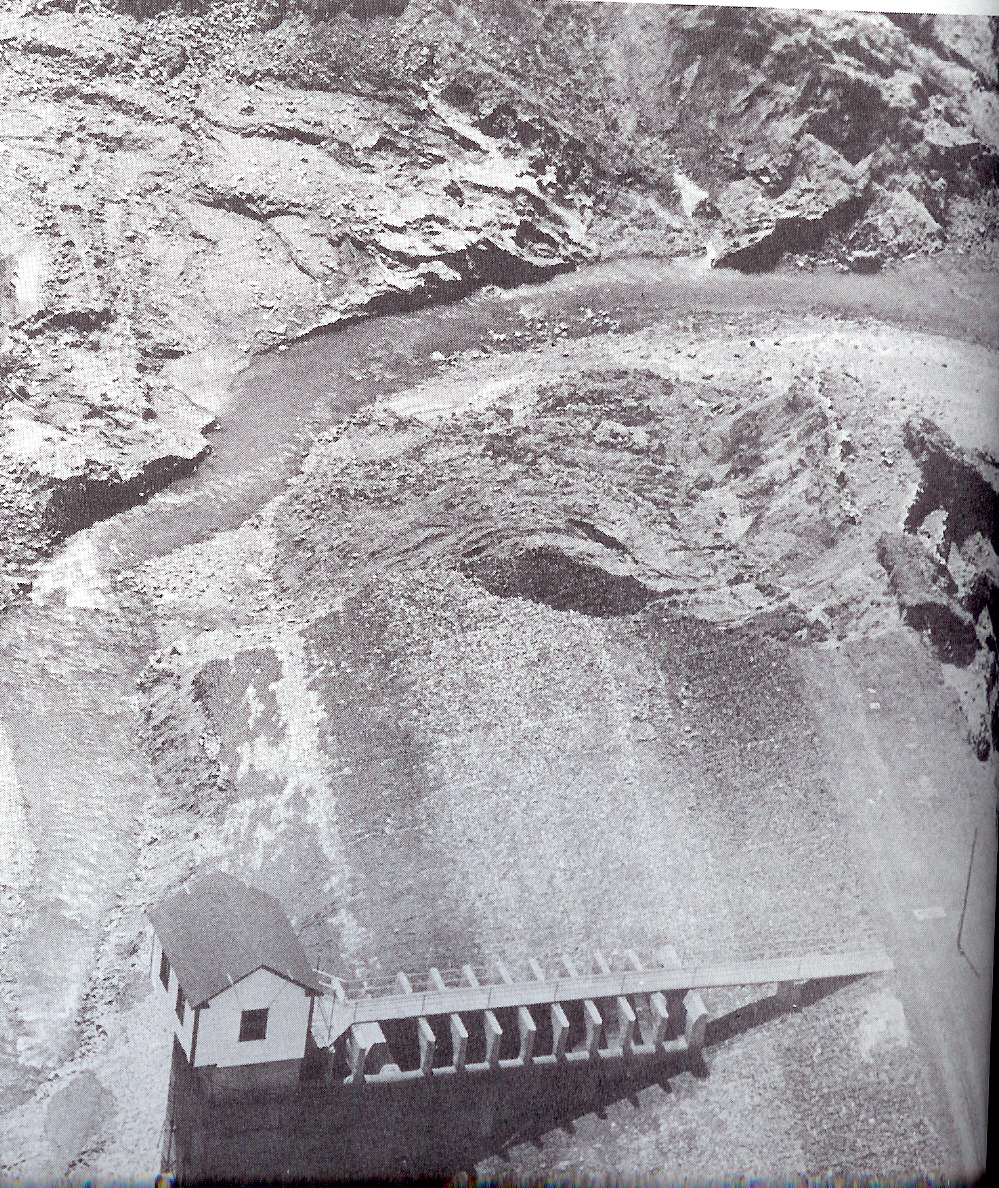
- Laurel Run dam failure in 1977

- Location within Pennsylvania
- Location: West Taylor Township, Cambria County, near Johnstown, Pennsylvania, U.S.
- Coordinates: 40°23′03″N 78°54′56″W
- Construction began: 1915
- Opening date: 1919
- Demolition date: July 20, 1977
- Owner: Johnstown Water Authority

Dam and spillways
- Type of dam: Earthen embankment
- Impounds: Laurel Run Creek
- Height: 42 feet (13 m)

Reservoir
- Creates: Laurel Run Reservoir
- Total capacity: 101,000,000 US gallons (380,000 m^{3})
- Catchment area: 18 square miles (47 km^{2})
- Surface area: 22 acres (89,000 m^{2})

The Laurel Run Dam, also known as Laurel Run Dam No. 2, was an earthen embankment dam that failed during the Johnstown Flood of 1977. It had the largest reservoir of seven dams to fail between July 19 and 20, 1977 and caused the most fatalities of the two that did. The dam failed in the early morning of July 20 after period of heavy rain, causing 101 million US gallons (380,000 m^{3}) of water to flood downstream Tanneryville, killing 40 people.

== History ==
During the 1860s, the Johnstown Water Company was planning new infrastructure to meet the municipal water needs of Johnstown, Pennsylvania. Laurel Run and Wild Cat Creeks were initially selected as sources and a dam was constructed on Laurel Run Creek in 1869 that impounded the 9 million US gallons (34,000 m^{3}) Laurel Run reservoir No. 1. Water was transferred from the reservoir through an 18,000-foot 16-inch cast iron pipe to Main and Market Streets in the old Johnstown Borough. Due to contamination and larger reservoirs being built, the Laurel Run reservoir No. 1 was abandoned in 1910.

After the Saltlick Reservoir was completed, workers and equipment were moved to construct the new Laurel Run reservoir No. 2 in 1915. The dam and reservoir were complete in 1919 and held a capacity of 101 million US gallons (380,000 m^{3}) of water. The dam was also designed for future enlargement.

=== 1977 failure ===
On the night of July 19, 1977, heavy rains drenched the Johnstown area; at 2:35 A.M. on July 20, the Laurel Run Dam failed. More than 100 million gallons of water were released when the earthen dam gave way. The resulting flood killed 40 people, destroyed 9 homes, and damaged 19 others in downstream Tanneryville. Most residents were asleep at the time and there was no warning system in place along the narrow 3-mile (4.8 km) valley below the dam. In addition, the rain and night-time conditions limited any escape. Overall, the failure caused US$5.3 million in damages (US$ 28 million in 2025). The Laurel Run Dam was over-topped with water which eroded its structure. Six other dams failed that day, four were small and two were minor in size. The Sandy Run Dam failure killed five people and was the only other failure to cause deaths.

=== Aftermath ===
The cause of the Laurel Run Dam's failure was attributed to an inadequate spillway design and stability issues, alongside allegations of a lack of enforcement of then-existing Pennsylvania dam safety regulations. Concerns about the dam had been previously brought to the attention of Greater Johnstown Water Authority officials by various engineering consultants, though their recommendations were repeatedly ignored. In a correspondence written shortly after the flood to the Secretary of the Pennsylvania Department of Environmental Resources Maurice K. Goddard, Pittsburgh-based geotechnical engineer Elio D'Appolonia of D'Appolonia Consulting Engineers stated:

Laurel Run is well known to me. We investigated this dam in the '60s. Its deficiencies were recognized and reports prepared for modification, but for various reasons, over a period of one-and-a-half decades, remedial steps or new construction was not taken. If the dam had been upgraded in accordance with today's prudent engineering practice, the dam would have been able to store and/or pass the storm.

Lawsuits were brought by flood victims families against the Greater Johnstown Water Authority and its dam maintenance contractor, Laurel Management Company, along with the Water Authority's management company, Bethlehem Steel, and the Pennsylvania Department of Environmental Resources. Though information was revealed that all named litigants could have taken precautions to prevent the dam's failure, these lawsuits were later settled out of court in 1989 for an undisclosed amount. After the events of July, 1977, the Laurel Run Dam was never rebuilt by the Greater Johnstown Water Authority. In 1990, the land below, and including, the site of the dam was designated the "Laurel Run Park" by West Taylor Township. Today, the exact site of the dam is now a grassy field scattered with planted trees and a park bench near the creek. The area that was the reservoir is now wetlands filled with various plants and animals.

== See also ==
- South Fork Dam – Built in 1853, its failure caused the 1889 Johnstown Flood.
- Dam failure
