= John White Alexander =

American painter (1856–1915)

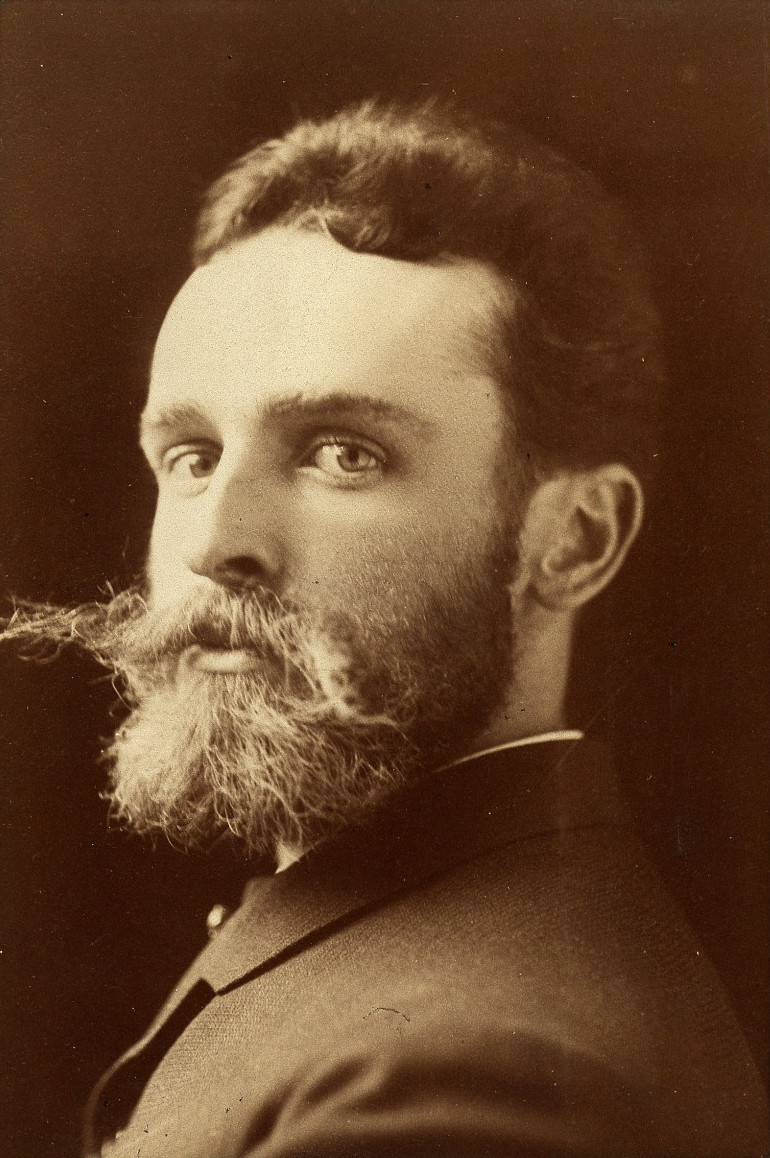
- Alexander in 1882 or 1883
- Born: October 7, 1856; Allegheny, Pennsylvania
- Died: May 31, 1915 (aged 58); New York
- Known for: Painting

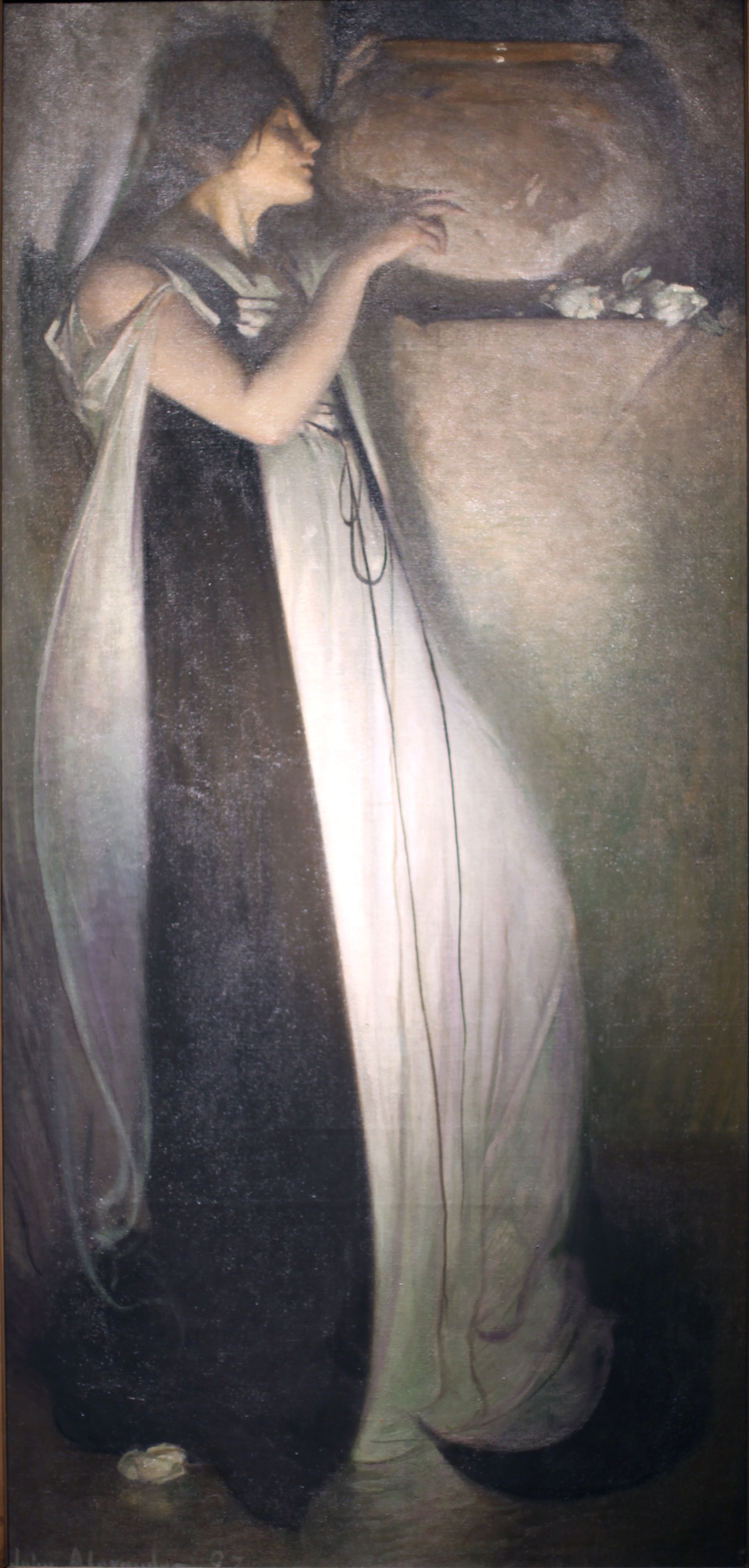
Isabella and the Pot of Basil, oil on canvas, 1897, Museum of Fine Arts, Boston

John White Alexander (October 7, 1856 – May 31, 1915) was an American portrait, figure, and decorative painter and illustrator.

== Early life and training ==
John White Alexander was born in Allegheny, Pennsylvania, now a part of Pittsburgh, Pennsylvania, on October 7, 1856. Orphaned in infancy, he was reared by his grandparents. He became a telegraph boy in Pittsburgh at the age of 12. Edward J. Allen (1830–1915), the secretary/treasurer of the Atlantic and Pacific Telegraph Company, recognized Alexander's drawing talent while he worked there and adopted him. Allen brought Alexander to the Allen home at "Edgehill" where Alexander painted various members of the Allen family, including Colonel Allen.

Alexander moved to New York City at the age of 18 and worked in an office at Harper's Weekly, where he was an illustrator and political cartoonist at the same time that Edwin Austin Abbey, Joseph Pennell, Howard Pyle, and other celebrated illustrators worked there. After an apprenticeship of three years, he traveled to Munich for his first formal training. Owing to the lack of funds, he removed to the village of Polling, Bavaria, and worked with Frank Duveneck. They traveled to Venice, where he profited from the advice of Whistler, and then he continued his studies in Florence, the Netherlands, and Paris.

== Career ==
In 1881, he returned to New York City and quickly achieved great success in portraiture, numbering among his sitters Oliver Wendell Holmes, John Burroughs, Henry G. Marquand, R.A.L. Stevenson, and James McCosh, the president of Princeton University.

His first exhibition in the Paris Salon of 1893 was a brilliant success and was followed by his immediate election to the Société Nationale des Beaux Arts. In 1889 he painted for Mrs. Jeremiah Milbank a well-received portrait of Walt Whitman and one of her husband, Jeremiah Milbank. In 1901 he was named Chevalier of the Legion of Honor, and in 1902 he became a member of the National Academy of Design, where he served as president from 1909 to 1915. He was a member of the American Academy of Arts and Letters. He received the gold medals of the Paris Exposition (1900) and the World's Fair in St. Louis (1904).

In 1909 the National Arts Club presented a retrospective exhibition of his work that included 63 canvases as well as photographs of his work.

He was several times a judge at the annual exhibit of the Carnegie Institution, and in other years he won prizes, once an honorable mention and twice the first prize, the second time in 1911 for Sunlight.

He served as a trustee of the Metropolitan Museum of Art from 1909 until his death in 1915.

He was among the artists who founded the National Society of Mural Painters in 1895 and he was elected to a five-year term as its president in 1914.

== Personal life ==
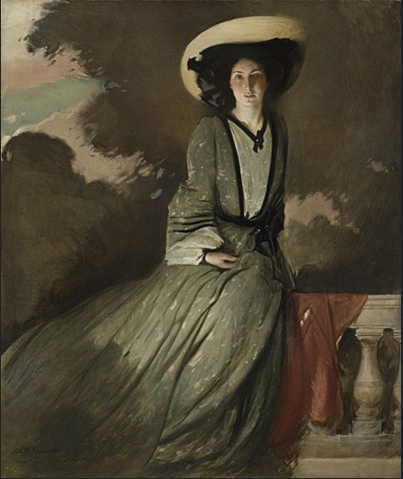
Portrait of Mrs. John W. Alexander

Alexander was married to Elizabeth Alexander (1866–1947), to whom he was introduced in part because of their shared last name. She was the daughter of James Waddell Alexander (1839–1915), longtime executive of the Equitable Life Assurance Society. The Alexanders had one child, the Princeton mathematician James Waddell Alexander II.

Alexander died of heart disease at his home in New York City on May 31, 1915. He was buried in Princeton, New Jersey, following a church service in Manhattan.

The Cleveland Museum of Art presented a memorial exhibit that included 27 of his works during the summer of 1917.

== Works ==
Many of his paintings are in museums and public places in the United States and in Europe, including the Metropolitan Museum of Art, the Brooklyn Art Museum, the Los Angeles County Museum of Art, the Museum of Fine Arts, Boston, the Butler Institute, and the Library of Congress in Washington D.C. In addition, in the entrance hall to the Art Museum of the Carnegie Institute in Pittsburgh, Pennsylvania, a series of Alexander's murals titled "Apotheosis of Pittsburgh" (1905–1907) covers the walls of the three-story atrium area.

Alexander's artist's proof of his portrait of Whitman, signed by the artist in April 1911, is in the Walt Whitman Collection at the University of Pennsylvania.

== Gallery ==
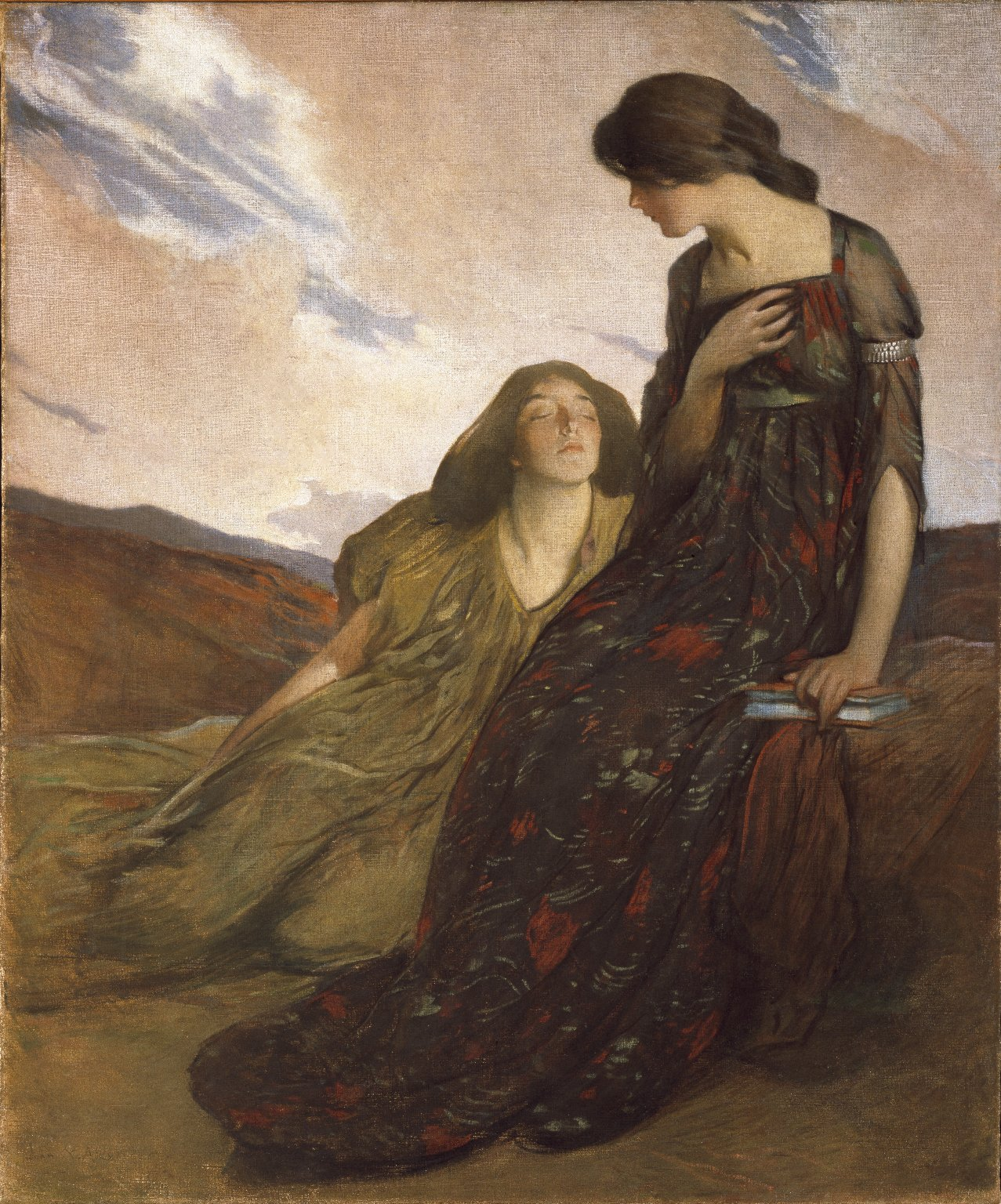
Memories, 1903, Brooklyn Museum

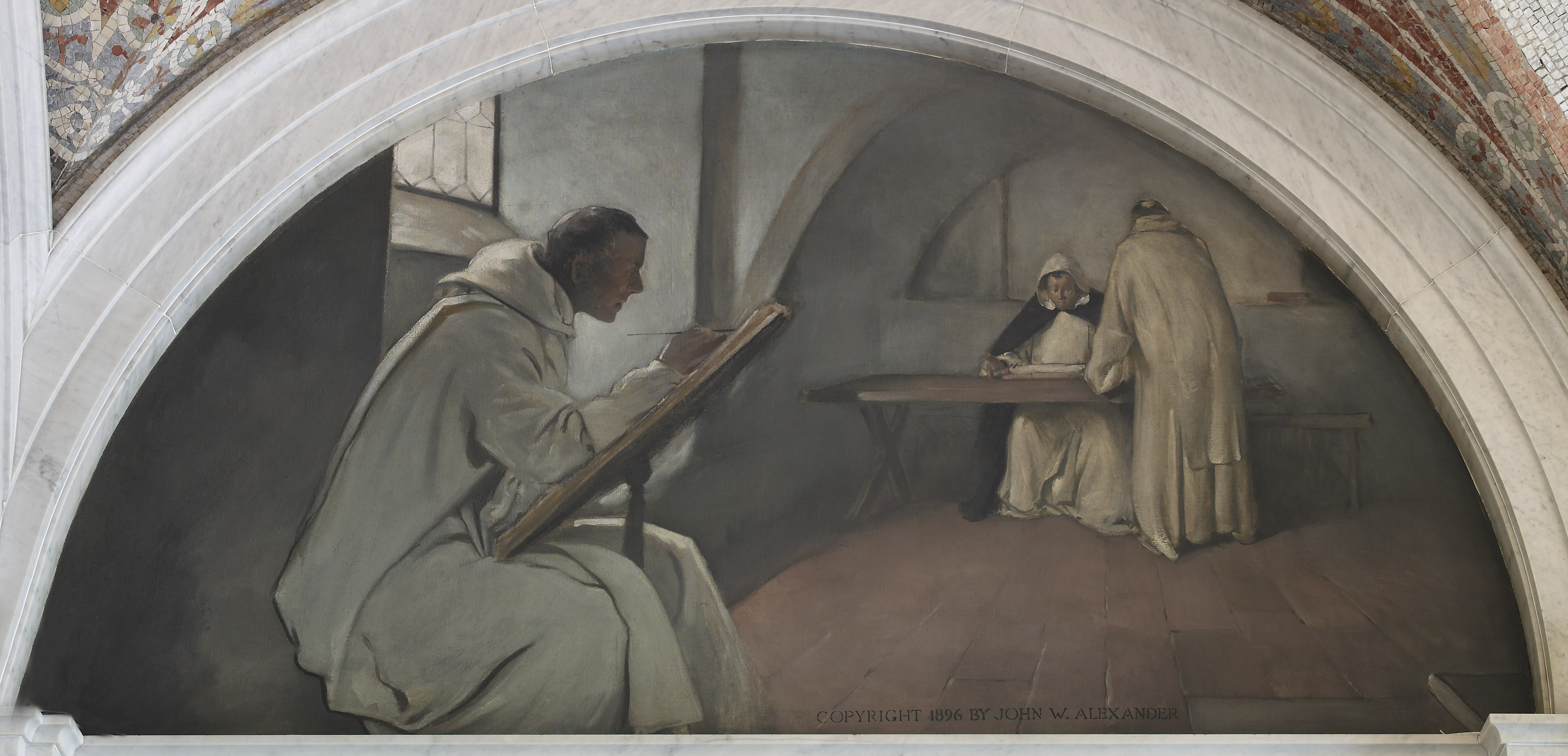
Manuscript Book mural, 1896, Library of Congress Thomas Jefferson Building, Washington, D.C.

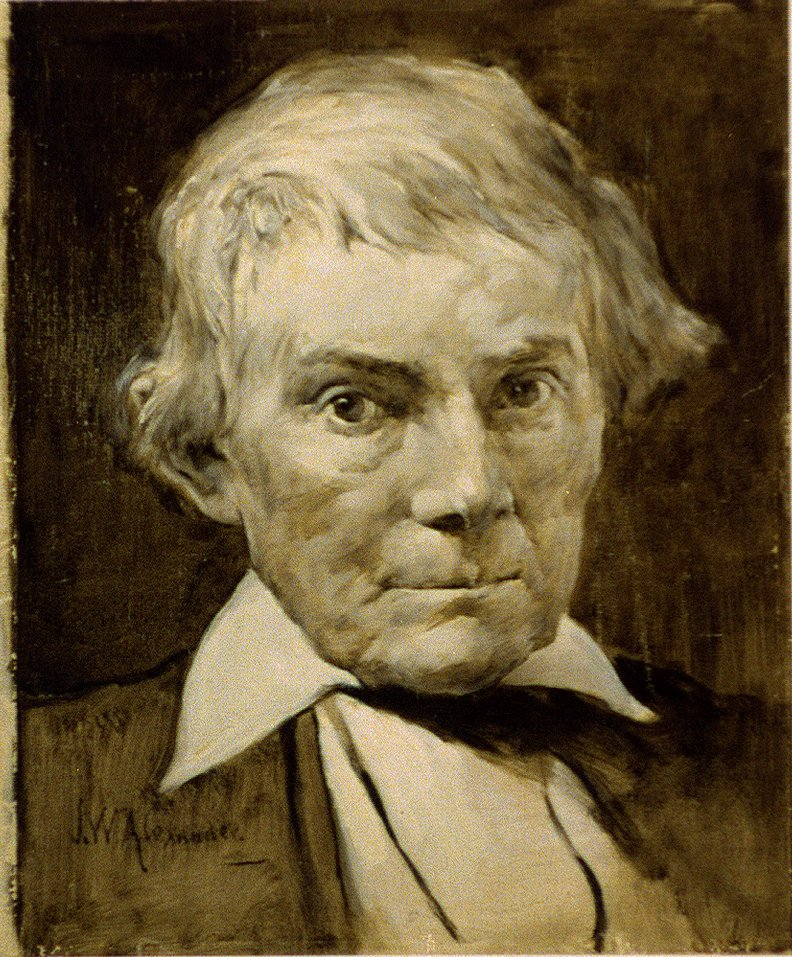
Alexander H. Stephens, 1883

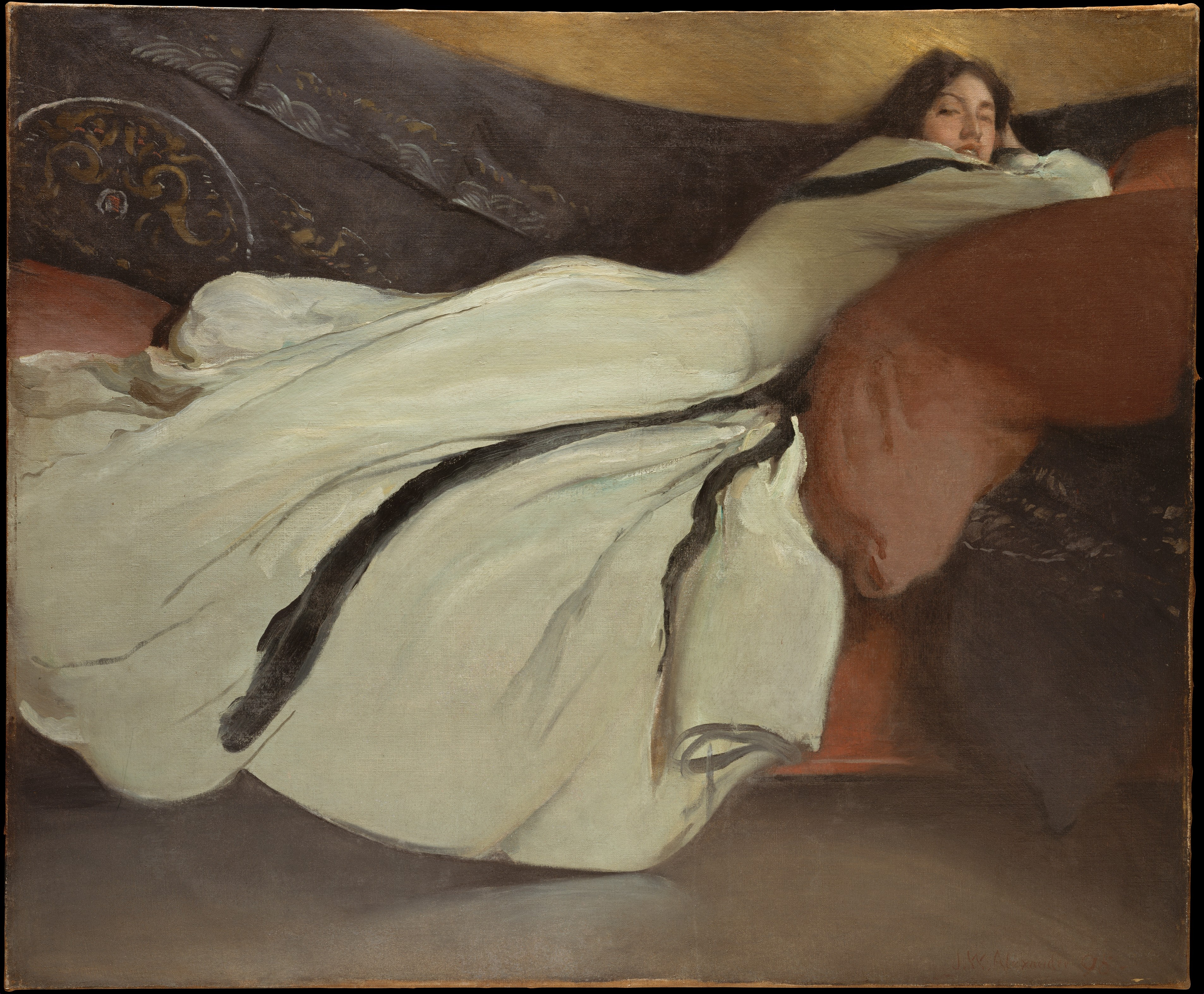
Repose, 1895, The Metropolitan Museum of Art
