= Johnstown Flood National Memorial =

Historic site in Pennsylvania, U.S.

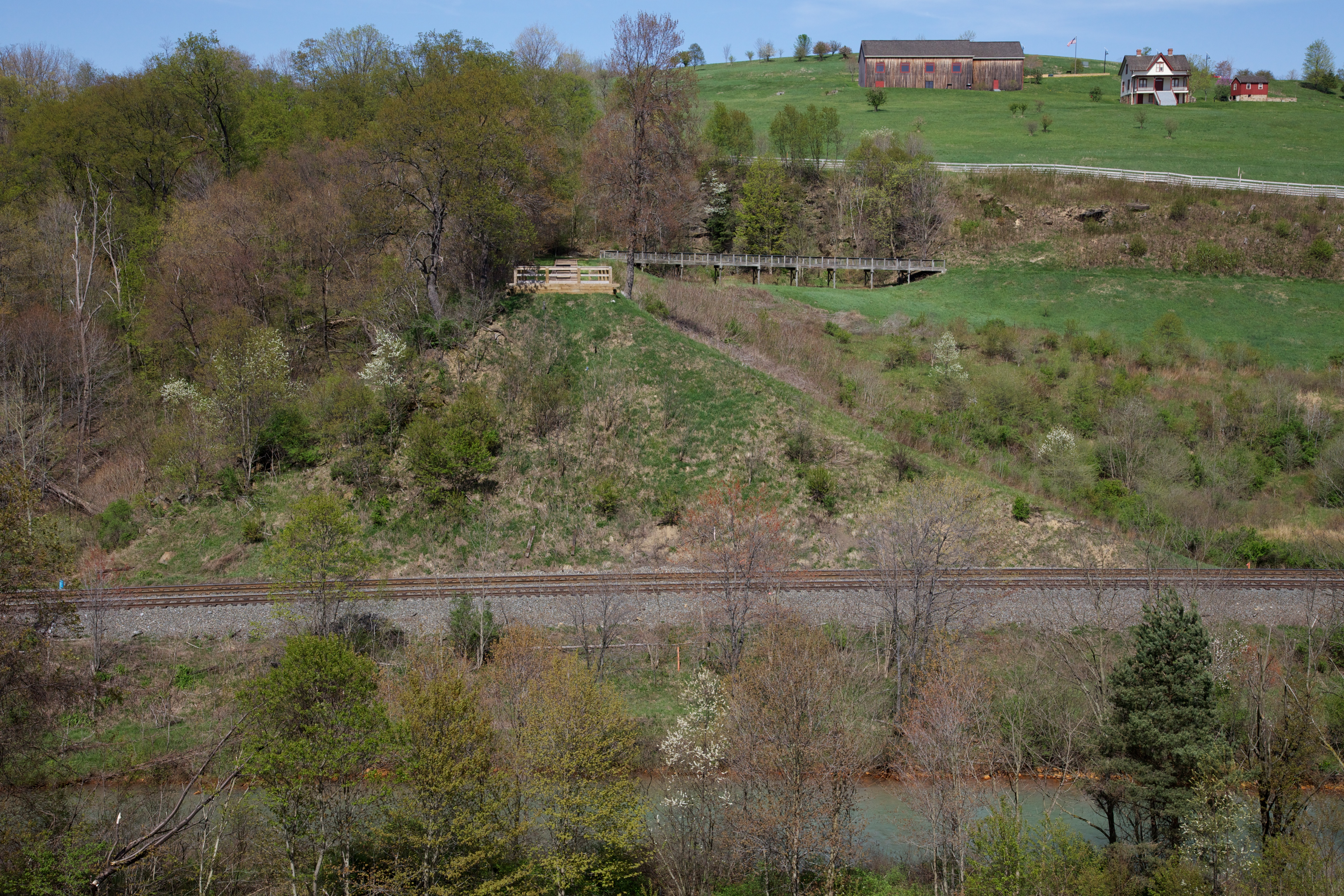
- Dam abutment and Elias Unger's farm

- Location within Pennsylvania Location within the United States
- Location: Croyle Township / Adams Township, Cambria County, Pennsylvania, United States
- Nearest city: Johnstown, Pennsylvania
- Coordinates: 40°20′44″N 78°46′43″W
- Area: 164.12 acres (66.42 ha)
- Established: August 31, 1964
- Visitors: 74,977 (in 2025)
- Governing body: National Park Service
- Website: Johnstown Flood National Memorial
- Johnstown Flood National Memorial
- U.S. National Register of Historic Places
- Nearest city: Johnstown, Pennsylvania
- Area: 163.5 acres (66.2 ha)
- Built: 1889
- NRHP reference No.: 66000656
- Added to NRHP: October 15, 1966

The Johnstown Flood National Memorial is a unit of the United States National Park Service in Cambria County, Pennsylvania, United States. Established in 1964 through legislation signed by President Lyndon B. Johnson, it pays tribute to the thousands of victims of the Johnstown Flood, who were injured or killed on May 31, 1889 when the South Fork Dam ruptured.

== History ==
=== History of the Johnstown Flood ===
Founded in 1800, Johnstown was a steel town that grew from the development of the Pennsylvania Railroad and other transportation services in Cambria County. By 1889, the town had a population of thirty thousand people who were of mostly German and Welsh ancestry. Established in the center of a narrow floodplain between Little Conemaugh and Stony Creek rivers, the community was surrounded, during the latter part of the nineteenth century, by land that had been altered by deforestation and the leveling of hills. These factors contributed to periodic floods, as did the narrow river valleys.

In 1836, the South Fork dam was built to create a reservoir (later named Conemaugh Lake) for the Pennsylvania Canal's western division. Measuring eight hundred and fifty feet at its breast section, the dam was made of earth and stone. It was reported to be the largest dam of its type in the world at the time of its construction. Subsequently abandoned by the canal system, it was purchased by private owners, including a former congressman.

Ultimately it was purchased by the South Fork Fishing and Hunting Club, an exclusive recreational group composed of wealthy individuals from the Pittsburgh region, for use as a summer mountain retreat. The club paid for repairs to the dam and additional development: a main building and "cottages" to transform the area into a boating and fishing resort community.

On May 31, 1889, the South Fork dam broke from the weight of combined heavy rains and a sudden freshet that had caused a significantly higher amount of water to accumulate in its reservoir than normal. The dam's rupture released twenty million tons of water, which traveled at forty miles per hour, creating a seventy-foot-high wall of water that was propelled fourteen miles downward into the Little Conemaugh River Valley, where it flooded Johnstown. Property, industry, homes, farms, and lives were destroyed as the water, debris, oil, and bodies of flood victims were caught in the arches of a Pennsylvania Railroad-owned stone bridge. Eighty of the trapped people subsequently died in a related fire.

Although the flood lasted for only ten minutes, the catastrophic damage it caused required five years of cleanup and rebuilding to enable residents of Johnstown to recover. In addition to the thousands of initial injuries and lives lost, the community was affected by an outbreak of typhoid fever, which developed from bacteria-tainted flood waters and lack of sanitation. Forty more people died.

Surviving residents were treated and cared for by relief corps from several cities in Southwestern Pennsylvania. The federal government and foreign countries also responded with more than $3.7 million in money, food, and clothing for the town. Clara Barton and the Red Cross also responded with substantial aid.

Just sixteen when the flood happened, survivor Victor Heiser years later recollected that time during a recording of his oral history. He remembered people living in the area near the dam often saying beforehand, "That dam will give way, but it won't ever happen to us." He said that when the flood hit, it was like a "huge wall" coming down the street. The longest-living survivor of the flood, Frank Shomo, died March 20, 1997, at the age of one hundred and eight.

=== History of the memorial ===
As a result of legislation proposed by U.S. Congressman John P. Saylor (R-PA), H.R. 931, which was supported by the Blair County Historical Society and the Pennsylvania Historical and Museum Commission, creation of this memorial was approved by the United States Congress on August 31, 1964. Signed into law by U.S. President Lyndon B. Johnson on September 2, 1964, the Johnstown Flood National Memorial was officially established.

It was to preserve the remains of the South Fork Dam. This had been found to be structurally lacking at the time of its rupture during the Johnstown Flood on May 31, 1889. Also conserved by this legislation were the former Lake Conemaugh bed, along with the nearby farm of Elias Unger and the clubhouse of the South Fork Fishing and Hunting Club, which had owned the dam and reservoir. The associated land is treated as a park.

The memorial is presently located at 733 Lake Road near South Fork, Pennsylvania, about 10 miles (16 km) northeast of Johnstown.

The clubhouse and several associated buildings have since been designated as part of a National Historic Landmark District, established in 1986 and listed on the National Register of Historic Places. They are significant not only for the role of the club in the flood, but as an example of elite recreational clubs in the late nineteenth century, and the architecture of the time.

== Park features ==
The visitor center at this national memorial offers two floors of exhibits with maps, views of the former dam, tactile displays, historic photographs of the South Fork Fishing and Hunting Club, a reproduction morgue book, the oral history of flood survivor Victor Heiser, and the film, "Black Friday." Visitors may go to the Unger House and the Springhouse.

Visitors to the national memorial may also explore the South Fork Fishing and Hunting Clubhouse, which was acquired by the park in 2006, and the Lake View Visitor Center. Ranger-interpreted and van-guided tours are also both available.

Hiking trails connect various parts of the memorial, and picnicking areas are also present throughout.

== Lakebed Rehabilitation Project ==
In January 2020, the Lakebed Rehabilitation Project began at the Johnston Flood National Memorial. The project's goal was to restore the view of how the lakebed looked before the breakage of the dam in 1889. Vegetation has grown in the area so the National Park Service Wildland Fire and Aviation staff cleared it using a masticator machine. This caused problems however as there are many places that both man and machine cannot clear with safety. An organization named Allegheny Goatscape from Pittsburgh used their services of 12 goats and a donkey to provide assistance in clearing the area. The herd is able to eat an approximate of an acre of vegetation every two weeks. Another organization named Russell Tree Experts from Ohio also assisted in mechanical clearing of the lakebed. This clearing project is expected to continue till the summer of 2021.

== Gallery ==
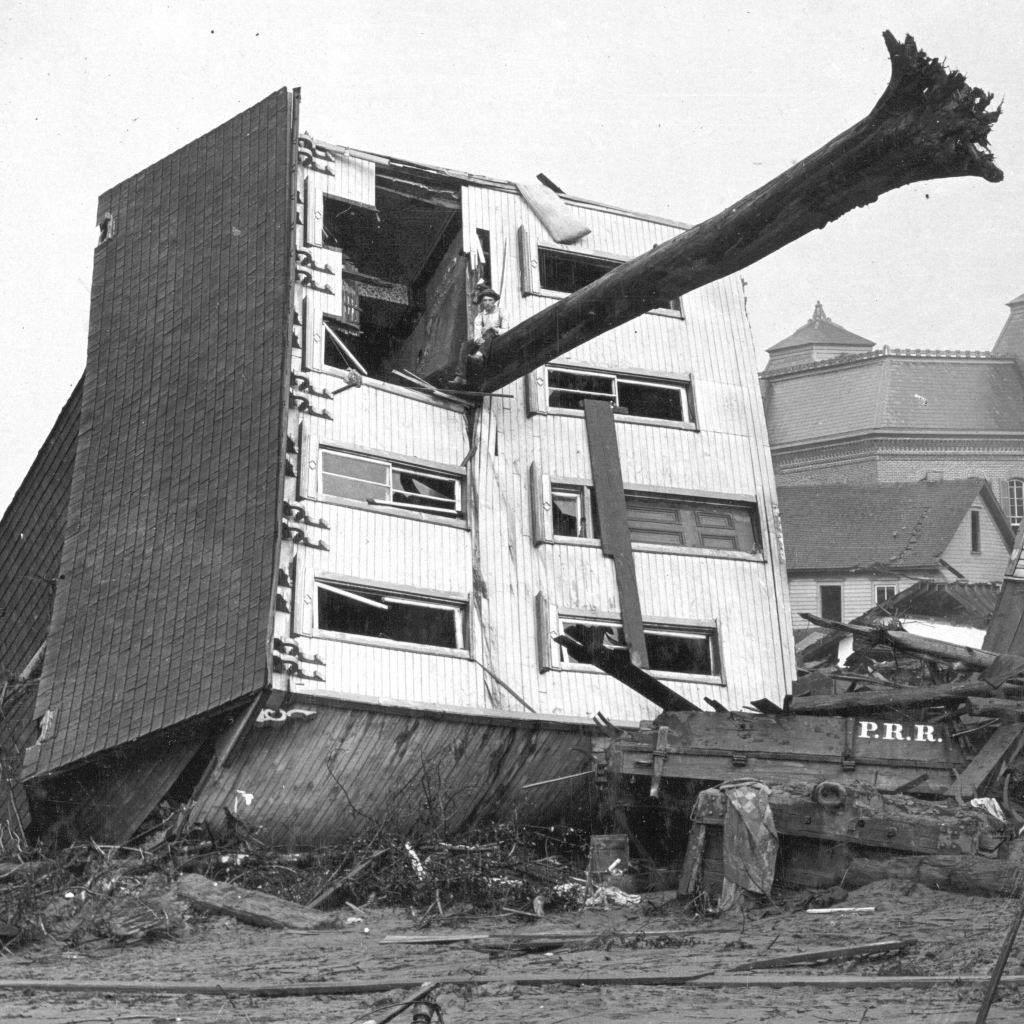

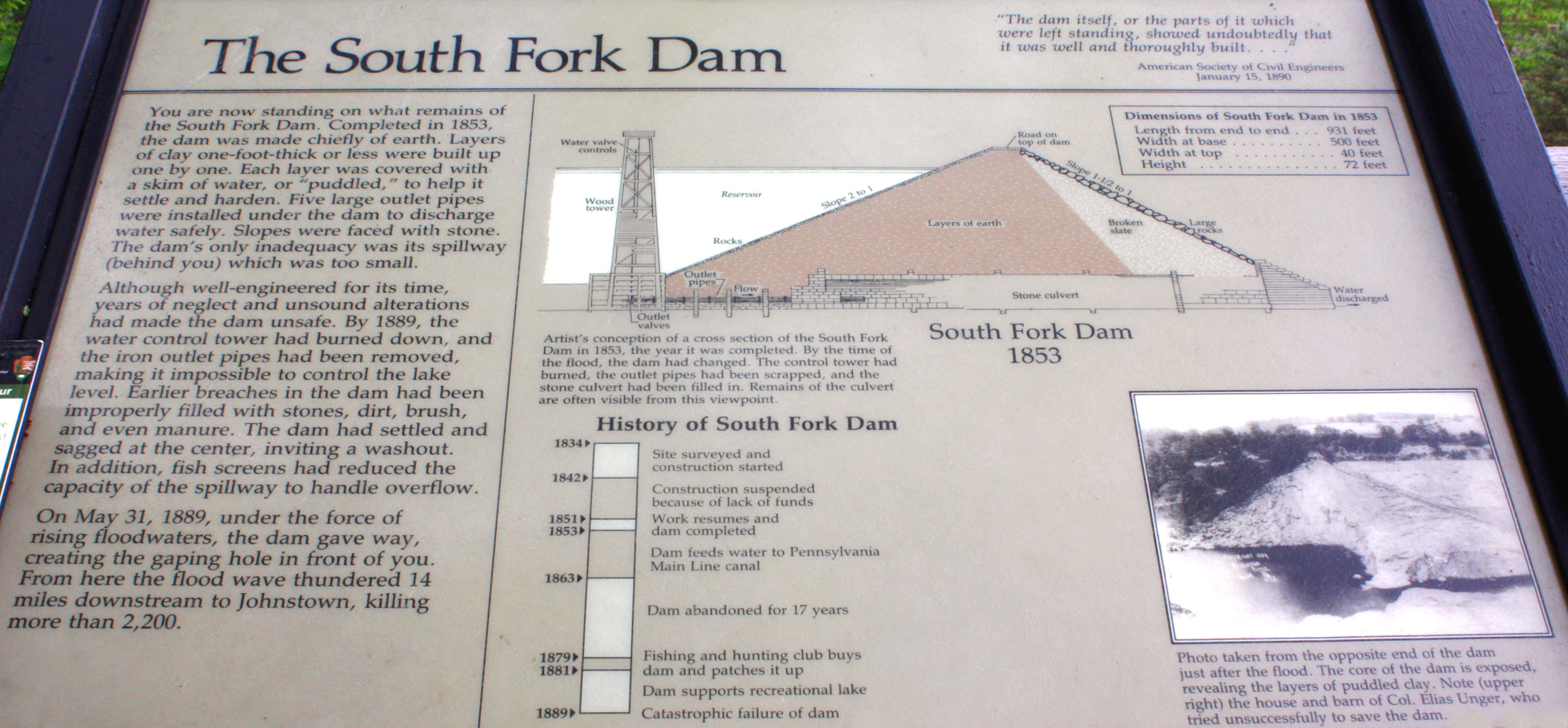

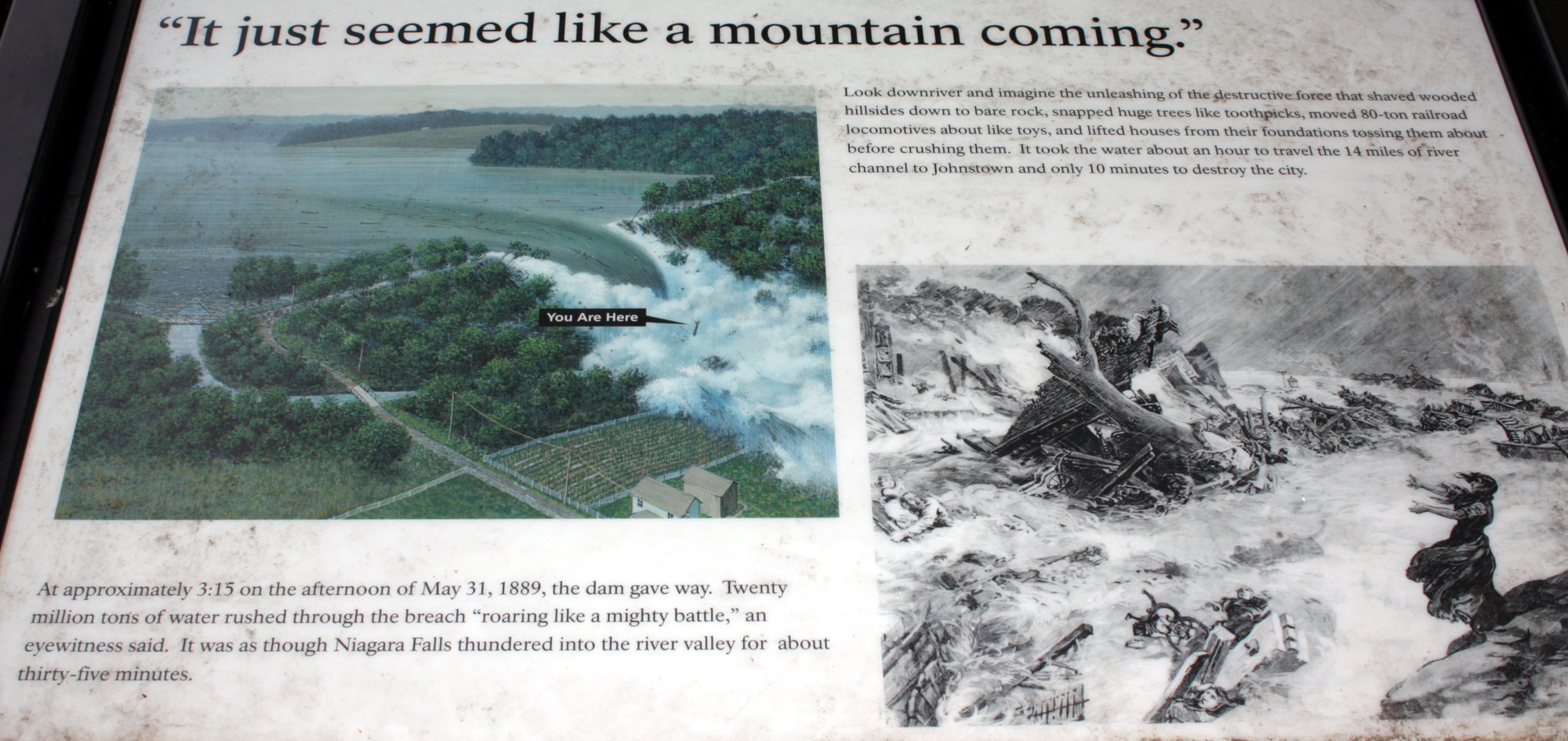

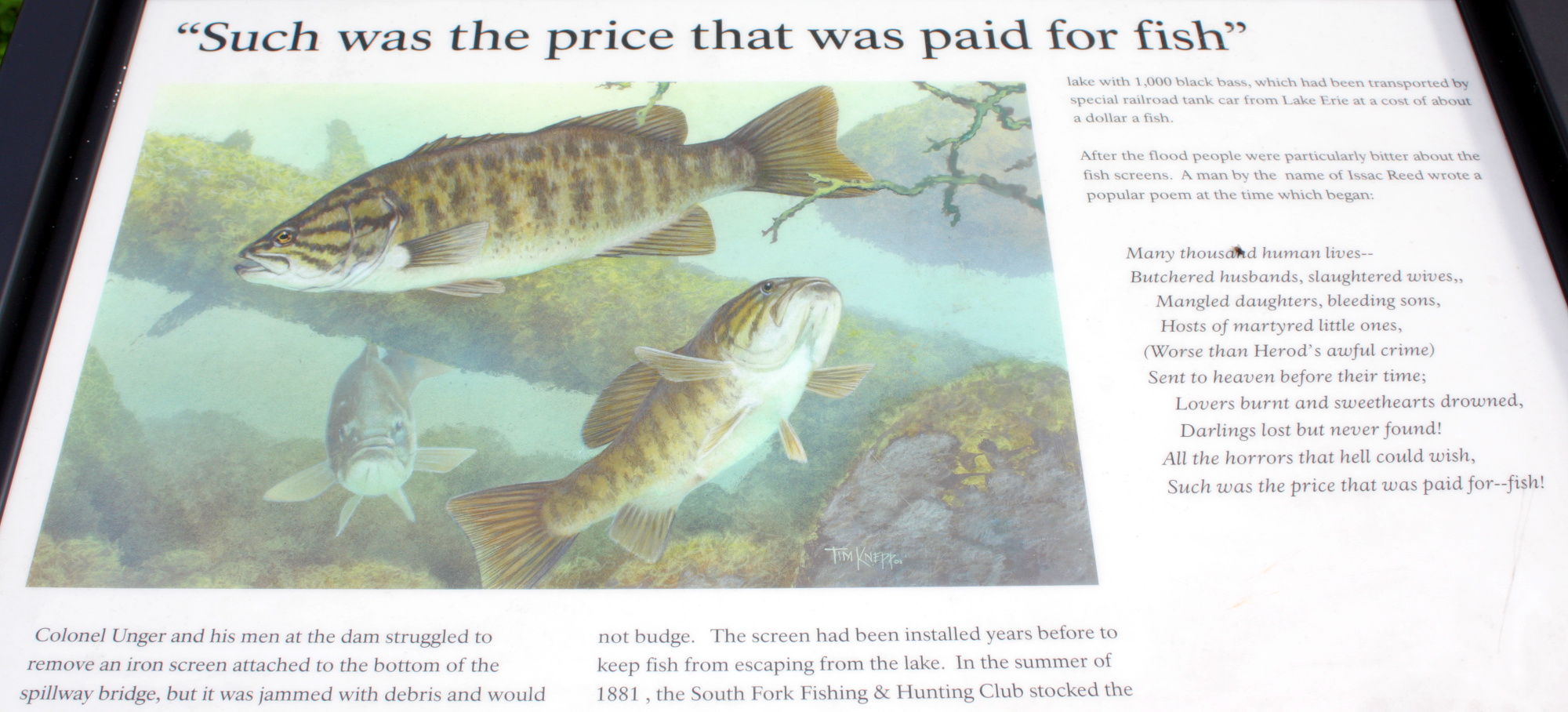

== See also ==
- List of national memorials of the United States
- South Fork Fishing and Hunting Club
- Johnstown flood of 1936
- Johnstown flood of 1977
- St. Francis Dam disaster
- Vajont Dam disaster
