= South Fork Fishing and Hunting Club =

Historic district in Pennsylvania, United States

- U.S. National Register of Historic Places
- U.S. Historic district
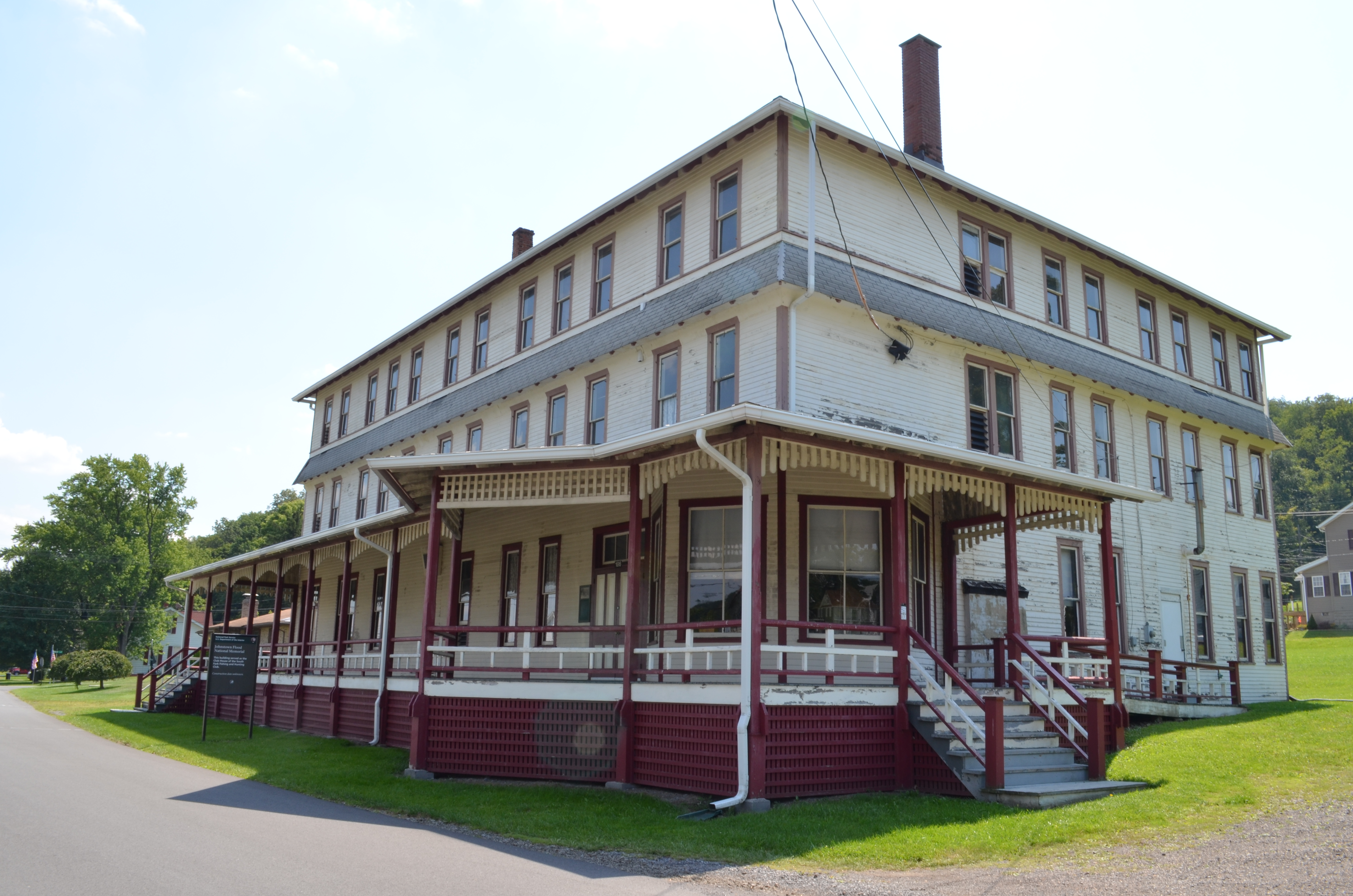
- Clubhouse, August 2012

- Location within Pennsylvania Location within the United States
- Interactive map showing the location for South Fork Fishing and Hunting Club
- Location: Roughly bounded by Fortieth, Main, and Lake Sts., Adams Township, Pennsylvania
- Coordinates: 40°20′17″N 78°46′24″W
- Area: 5.6 acres (2.3 ha)
- Built: 1883
- Architectural style: Stick/eastlake, Gothic, Queen Anne
- NRHP reference No.: 86002091
- Added to NRHP: July 31, 1986

The South Fork Fishing and Hunting Club was a Pennsylvania corporation that operated an exclusive and secretive retreat at a mountain lake in St. Michael, Pennsylvania, near the community of South Fork. Its members were more than 50 extremely wealthy industrialists and their families. Most were based in Pittsburgh, the center of steel and related industries.

The club owned the South Fork Dam and an associated reservoir. The earthen dam failed on May 31, 1889, causing the Johnstown Flood that killed more than 2,200 people downstream. An estimated 14.3 million tons of water from Lake Conemaugh were released, wreaking devastation along the valley of South Fork Creek and the Little Conemaugh River and the dozen miles downstream to Johnstown, Pennsylvania, United States.

It was the worst disaster in U.S. history at the time. Relief efforts were among the first major actions of Clara Barton and her newly organized American Red Cross.

The club was found to have neglected maintenance on the earthen dam and performed some ill-advised alterations. Despite some years of claims and litigation, the club and its members were never found to be liable for monetary damages. The corporation was disbanded in 1904. Its real estate was sold by the local sheriff at public auction, largely to satisfy a mortgage on the large clubhouse.

The club, the flood and later investigations have continued to be subject of studies, commemoration, and cultural works. A Johnstown Flood National Memorial was created. In addition, in 1986 the remaining buildings of the club and associated property were designated as a National Historic Landmark District, and listed on the National Register of Historic Places.

== Club and dam history ==
In the late 19th century, Pittsburgh was the center of industry and had many extremely wealthy entrepreneurs and businessmen. In 1880, entrepreneur Benjamin Franklin Ruff suggested organizing a club to establish an exclusive mountain retreat as a center of summer recreation for members. He and Henry Clay Frick established the club in 1881.

Ruff had previously bought property that he offered for sale to the club, promoting the idea to Henry Clay Frick, a friend and among the wealthy elite group of men who controlled Pittsburgh's steel, rail and other industries. The newly organized club purchased property including an old dam and abandoned reservoir from Ruff. He had purchased it from former Congressman John Reilly (D-PA).

The reservoir behind the dam was named as Lake Conemaugh by the club. It was about two miles (3.2 km) long, approximately one mile (1.6 km) wide, and 60 feet (18 m) deep near the dam. The lake had a perimeter of seven miles (11 km) and could hold 14.3 million tons of water. When the water was "up" in the spring, the lake covered more than 400 acres (1.6 km^{2}). The South Fork Dam was 72 feet (22 m) high and 931 feet (284 m) long.

Despite being both well-designed and well-built when new, it failed for the first time in 1862. A history of negligent maintenance and alterations were later believed to have contributed to its failure on May 31, 1889. Between 1881 when the club was opened and 1889, this dam frequently sprang leaks and was patched, mostly with mud and straw.

== Dam flaws ==
Before closing on Ruff's purchase, Congressman Reilly had had crucial discharge pipes removed and sold for their value as scrap metal. There was no longer a practical way to lower the level of water behind the dam should repairs be indicated.

Ruff, although not a civil engineer, had a background that included being a railroad tunnel contractor. He had supervised repairs to the dam. But these did not include a successful resolution of the inability to discharge the water and substantially lower the lake for repair purposes.

The five cast iron discharge pipes, each with an inside diameter of two feet, had previously allowed a controlled release of water. When the initial renovation was completed under Ruff's oversight, it became impossible to drain the lake to repair the dam properly, as the dam and lake area were modified to suit recreational interests.

Most significantly, in order to provide a carriageway across the dam, the top was leveled off, lowering it. The dam was only a few feet higher than the water level at its lowest point. To compound the problem, the club owners and managers had erected fish screens across the mouth of the spillway. Although that was intended to keep water from accumulating to the point of straining the dam, the spillway screens became clogged with debris, restricting the outflow of water.

Daniel Johnson Morrell became a member of the club to observe the state of the dam under its stewardship. He campaigned to club officials, especially to Ruff, its co-founder, regarding the safety of the dam. Morrell insisted on inspections of the dam's breastwork both by his own engineers (including John Fulton), and by those of the Pennsylvania Railroad. Morrell's warnings went unheeded. His offer to do repairs, partially at his own expense, was rejected by club president Benjamin F. Ruff (who died two years before the flood). Morrell joined the club to further express his concerns, but died four years before the flood he had labored to prevent.

The dam had not failed completely since 1862. Notwithstanding leaks and other warning signs, the flawed dam held the waters of Lake Conemaugh back until disaster struck in May 1889. The president of the club at the time of the flood was Colonel Elias Unger. The founding entrepreneur, Benjamin F. Ruff, had died several years earlier, and Unger had been on the job only a short time.

The American Society of Civil Engineers launched an investigation of the South Fork Dam breach immediately after the flood. However, according to modern research conducted by, among others, University of Pittsburgh instructor Neil M. Coleman, the report was delayed, subverted, and whitewashed, before being released two years after the disaster.

Coleman published a book that gave details of the 21st-century investigation, its participating engineers, and the science behind the 1889 flood, titled Johnstown's Flood of 1889 - Power Over Truth and the Science Behind the Disaster (2018).

== Club members ==
The sixteen charter members of the South Fork Fishing and Hunting Club, including Henry Clay Frick who assembled them in November 1879, were Benjamin Ruff, T. H. Sweat, Charles J. Clarke, Thomas Clark, Walter F. Fundenberg, Howard Hartley, Henry C. Yeager, J. B. White, E. A. Myers, C. C. Hussey, D. R. Euwer (as spelled below), C. A. Carpenter, W. L. Dunn, W. L. McClintock, and A. V. Holmes.

Alphabetically, a complete listing of club membership included:

- Edward Jay Allen – helped to organize the Pacific and Atlantic Telegraph Company
- D. W. C Bidwell – owner of a mining industry explosives supply company
- James W. Brown – member of the 58th United States Congress, president of the Colonial Steel Company, and secretary and treasurer for Hussey, Howe and Company, Steel Works, Ltd.
- Hilary B. Brunot – attorney in Pittsburgh
- John Caldwell, Jr. – treasurer of the Philadelphia Company
- Andrew Carnegie – Scottish-American industrialist, businessman, entrepreneur and a major philanthropist
- C.A. Carpenter – freight agent for the Pennsylvania Railroad
- John Weakley Chalfant – president of People's National Bank, associated with steel tubing manufacturer Spang, Chalfant and Company
- George H. Christy – attorney in Pittsburgh
- Thomas Clark
- Charles John Clarke – founder of Pittsburgh-based transportation company Clarke and Company, father of Louis Clarke
- Louis Semple Clarke – co-founder of the Autocar Company and developer of the first porcelain-insulated spark plugs
- A. C. Crawford
- William T. Dunn – owner of the building supply company William T. Dunn and Company
- Cyrus Elder (1833-1912); prominent attorney; chief counsel for the Cambria Iron Company; author; civil leader; sole Johnstown resident club member, who had acquired Daniel Johnson Morrell's membership upon his death; flood survivor
- Daniel R. Euwer – lumber dealer for Euwer and Brothers
- John King Ewing – involved with real estate through Ewing and Byers
- Aaron S. French – founder of A. French Spring Company, manufacturer of steel springs for railroad cars
- Henry Clay Frick – successful American industrialist and art patron
- Walter Franklin Fundenburg – dentist
- A. G. Harmes – manufacturer of machinery through his Harmes Machinery Depot
- John A. Harper –assistant cashier of the Bank of Pittsburgh, president of Western Pennsylvania Hospital
- Howard Hartley – manufacturer of leather products and rubber belts through Hartley Brothers
- Henry Holdship – co-founder of the Art Society of Pittsburgh and the Pittsburgh Symphony Orchestra
- Americus Vespecius Holmes – vice-president of Dollar Bank
- Durbin Horne – president of retail company Joseph Horne and Company
- George Franklin Huff – member of the Pennsylvania State Senate from 1884 to 1888, member of the 52nd United States Congress, the 54th United States Congress, and the 58th United States Congress and the three succeeding Congresses
- Christopher Curtis Hussey – Hussey, Howe and Company, steel manufacturers
- Harriet Augusta Byram Hussey – wife of C.C. Hussey, elected as the club's only female member following her husband's death in 1884
- Lewis Irwin
- Philander Chase Knox – American lawyer and politician who served as US Attorney General, U.S. Senator from Pennsylvania, and, lastly, as Secretary of State from 1909 to 1913
- Frank B. Laughlin – secretary of the Solar Carbon and Manufacturing Company
- John Jacob Lawrence – paint and color manufacturer, partner of Moses Suydam
- John George Alexander Leishman – worked in various executive positions at Carnegie Steel Company, served as Envoy Extraordinary and Minister Plenipotentiary to Turkey from 1899–1901
- Jesse H. Lippincott – associated with the Banner Baking Powder firm
- Sylvester Stephen Marvin – in the cracker business, founding S. S. Marvin Co., centerpiece to the organization of the National Biscuit Company)
- Frank T., Oliver, and Walter L. McClintock – associated with O. McClintock and Company, a mercantile house
- James S. McCord – owner of the wholesale hatters McCord and Company
- James McGregor
- W. A. McIntosh (president of the New York and Cleveland Gas Coal Company; father of Burr McIntosh and Nancy McIntosh)
- H. Sellers McKee – president of the First National Bank of Birmingham, founder of Jeannette, Pennsylvania
- Andrew W. Mellon – American banker, industrialist, philanthropist, and art collector; US Secretary of the Treasury from March 4, 1921, until February 12, 1932
- Reuben Miller – Miller, Metcalf and Perkin, Crescent Steel Works
- Maxwell K. Moorhead – son of James K. Moorhead
- Daniel Johnson Morrell – general manager of the Cambria Iron Company, member of the 40th United States Congress (and 41st United States Congresses, 1867-1871 (R-PA)
- William Mullens
- Edwin A. Meyers – Myers, Shinkle and Company
- H. P. Patton – associated with the window glass manufacturer A. and D. H. Chambers
- Duncan Clinch Phillips – window glass millionaire, father of Duncan Phillips
- Henry Phipps, Jr. – chairman of Carnegie Brothers and Company entrepreneur and major philanthropist
- Robert Pitcairn – Scottish-American railroad executive who headed the Pittsburgh Division of the Pennsylvania Railroad in the late 19th century
- D. W. Ranking – physician
- Samuel Rea – engineer and the 9th president of the Pennsylvania Railroad from 1913 to 1925
- James Hay Reed – partner with Philander Knox in the law firm Knox and Reed, a federal judge nominated by President Benjamin Harrison
- Benjamin F. Ruff – first president of the South Fork Fishing and Hunting Club, tunnel contractor, coke salesman, real estate broker
- Marvin F. Scaife – producer of iron products through W. B. Scaife and Sons
- James M. Schoonmaker – J. M. Schoonmaker Coke Company
- James Ernest Schwartz – president of Pennsylvania Lead Company
- Frank Semple
- Christian Bernard Shea – member of Joseph Horne Company
- Moses Bedell Suydam – M. B. Suydam and Company
- F. H. Sweet
- Benjamin Thaw Sr. – co founder of Heda Coke Company, brother of Harry Kendall Thaw
- Colonel Elias J. Unger – managed hotels along the Pennsylvania Railroad, second and last president of the South Fork Fishing and Hunting Club, honorary title (did not have a military record)
- Calvin Wells – president of Pittsburgh Forge and Iron Company.
- James B. White – manufacturer of manganese ore through James B. White and Company
- John F. Wilcox – civil engineer
- James H. Willock – cashier of the Second National Bank
- Joseph R. Woodwell – served on the board of directors for Deposit Bank of Pittsburgh and the Carnegie Institution for Science
- William K. Woodwell – associated with Joseph R. Woodwell and company
- H. C. Yeager – dry goods and trimming wholesaler through C. Yeager and Company

== Johnstown Flood ==
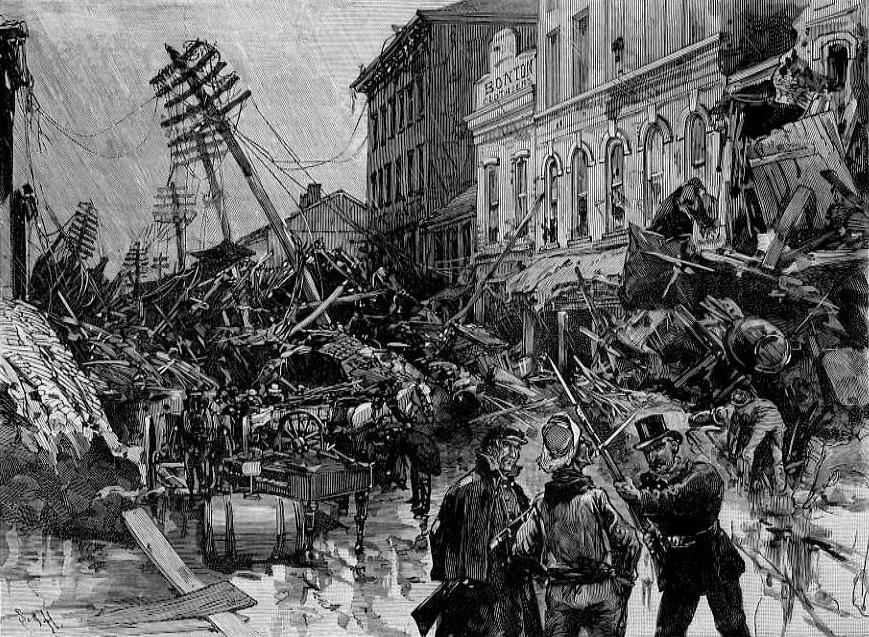
After the Flood at Johnstown -- Main Street

After several days of unprecedented rainfall in the Alleghenies, the dam gave way on May 31, 1889. A torrent of water raced downstream, destroying several towns. When it reached Johnstown, 2,209 people were killed, and there was $17 million ($473 million in 2020 terms) in damage. The disaster became widely known as the Johnstown Flood, and locally known as the "Great Flood".

Rumors of the dam's potential for harm, and its likelihood of bursting, had been circulating for years. At least three warnings sent from South Fork to Johnstown by telegram the day of the disaster went virtually unheeded downstream.

When word of the dam's failure was telegraphed from South Fork by Joseph P. Wilson to Robert Pitcairn in Pittsburgh, Frick and other members of the Club gathered to form the Pittsburgh Relief Committee for tangible assistance to the flood victims. They determined to never speak publicly about the club or the Flood. This strategy was a success.

Club members and its attorneys Philander C. Knox and James H. Reed were able to fend off four lawsuits against the club; Colonel Unger, its president; and against 50 named members. Each case was "either settled or discontinued and, as far as is known, no one bringing action profited thereby."

In the years following this disaster, many people blamed the South Fork Fishing and Hunting Club for the flood. The club owned the dam and was responsible for its maintenance. Despite the evidence to suggest that they were to blame, the Club membership evaded legal responsibility for the disaster. Knox and Reed successfully argued that the dam's failure was a natural disaster and an Act of God. The survivors never received any legal compensation.

The perceived injustice contributed to the acceptance a legal finding of “strict, joint, and several liability,” so that a “non-negligent defendant could be held liable for damage caused by the unnatural use of land.”

Individual members of the club did contribute substantially to the relief efforts. Along with about half of the club members, Henry Clay Frick donated thousands of dollars to the relief effort in Johnstown. After the flood, Andrew Carnegie, one of the club's better-known members, built the town a new library. In modern times, this former library is owned by the Johnstown Area Heritage Association. It houses the Flood Museum.

== Aftermath ==
On February 5, 1904, the Cambria Freeman reported, under the headline "Will Pass Out of History":

The South Fork Hunting and Fishing Club, owners of the Conemaugh Reservoir at the time of the Great Flood, will soon pass out of history as an organization with the sale of all its personal effects remaining in the clubhouse at the reservoir site. Auctioneer George Harshberger has announced that the sale will take place on Thursday, the 25th inst., at the clubhouse, when the entire furnishings will be disposed of at auction. In the list to be disposed of are fifty bedroom suites, many yards of carpet, silverware and table ware with the club monogram engraved thereon and many odd pieces of furniture and bric-a-brac. At the time of the Great Flood the club house was handsomely furnished and was fully equipped to care for at least 200 guests. During the summer of 1889 the clubhouse remained open but has since been occupied only by a caretaker.

== Legacy of the flood ==
Survivors and descendants have worked to create what is known as the Johnstown Flood National Memorial to commemorate events of the flood. It is a park along the river.

== South Fork Fishing and Hunting Club Historic District ==
The Johnstown Flood National Memorial sought stewardship of the club property to "significantly increase the park's capability to interpret the important events surrounding the Johnstown Flood and the individuals associated with it." The South Fork Fishing and Hunting Club Historic District was designated in 1986 as what is now termed a National Historic Landmark District and listed on the National Register of Historic Places.

The district includes eight contributing buildings remaining from the club, including the club house and six cottages. They are representative of popular late-19th century architectural styles, including Stick/Eastlake, Gothic Revival, and Queen Anne.

== Representation in other media ==
- In Sunlight, In a Beautiful Garden is a 2001 novel by Kathleen Cambor, based on the flood. It briefly refers to certain historic club figures in cameo roles.
