= Croyle =

Croyle can refer to:

- Brodie Croyle, American football player
- Croyle Township, Cambria County, Pennsylvania
