= R. Milton Speer =

American politician (1838–1890)

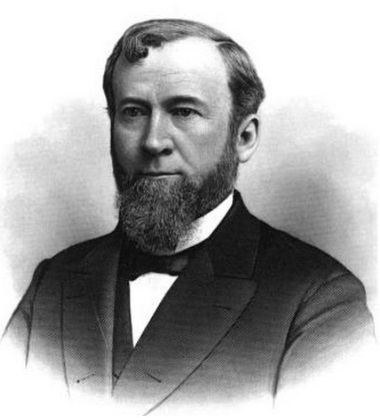
- From Volume II (1890) of Encyclopedia of Contemporary Biography of Pennsylvania

Member of the U.S. House of Representatives from Pennsylvania's 17th district
- In office March 4, 1871 – March 3, 1875
- Preceded by: Daniel J. Morrell
- Succeeded by: John Reilly

Personal details
- Born: Robert Milton Speer; September 8, 1838 Cassville, Pennsylvania, U.S.
- Died: January 17, 1890 (aged 51) New York City, U.S.
- Resting place: Riverview Cemetery, Huntingdon, Pennsylvania, U.S.
- Party: Democratic
- Occupation: Politician, lawyer

Robert Milton Speer (September 8, 1838 – January 17, 1890) was a Democratic member of the U.S. House of Representatives from Pennsylvania.

Robert M. Speer was born in Cassville, Pennsylvania. He attended Cassville Academy, taught school, studied law, was admitted to the bar in 1859 and commenced practice in Huntingdon, Pennsylvania. He was elected assistant clerk of the Pennsylvania State House of Representatives in 1863.

Speer was elected as a Democrat to the Forty-second and Forty-third Congresses. He was not a candidate for renomination in 1874. He was a delegate to the Democratic National Conventions in 1872 and 1880. He resumed the practice of law and in 1876 became one of the proprietors of the Huntingdon Monitor. He was an unsuccessful candidate for election in 1880 to the Forty-seventh Congress. He died in New York City in 1890. Interment is in Riverview Cemetery in Huntingdon, Pennsylvania.

== Sources ==
- United States Congress. "R. Milton Speer (id: S000713)". Biographical Directory of the United States Congress.
- Robert Milton Speer at The Political Graveyard

U.S. House of Representatives
Preceded by Daniel J. Morrell	Member of the U.S. House of Representatives from Pennsylvania's 17th congressional district 1871–1875	Succeeded by John Reilly
