= Marion Reilly (educator) =

American education leader (1879–1928)

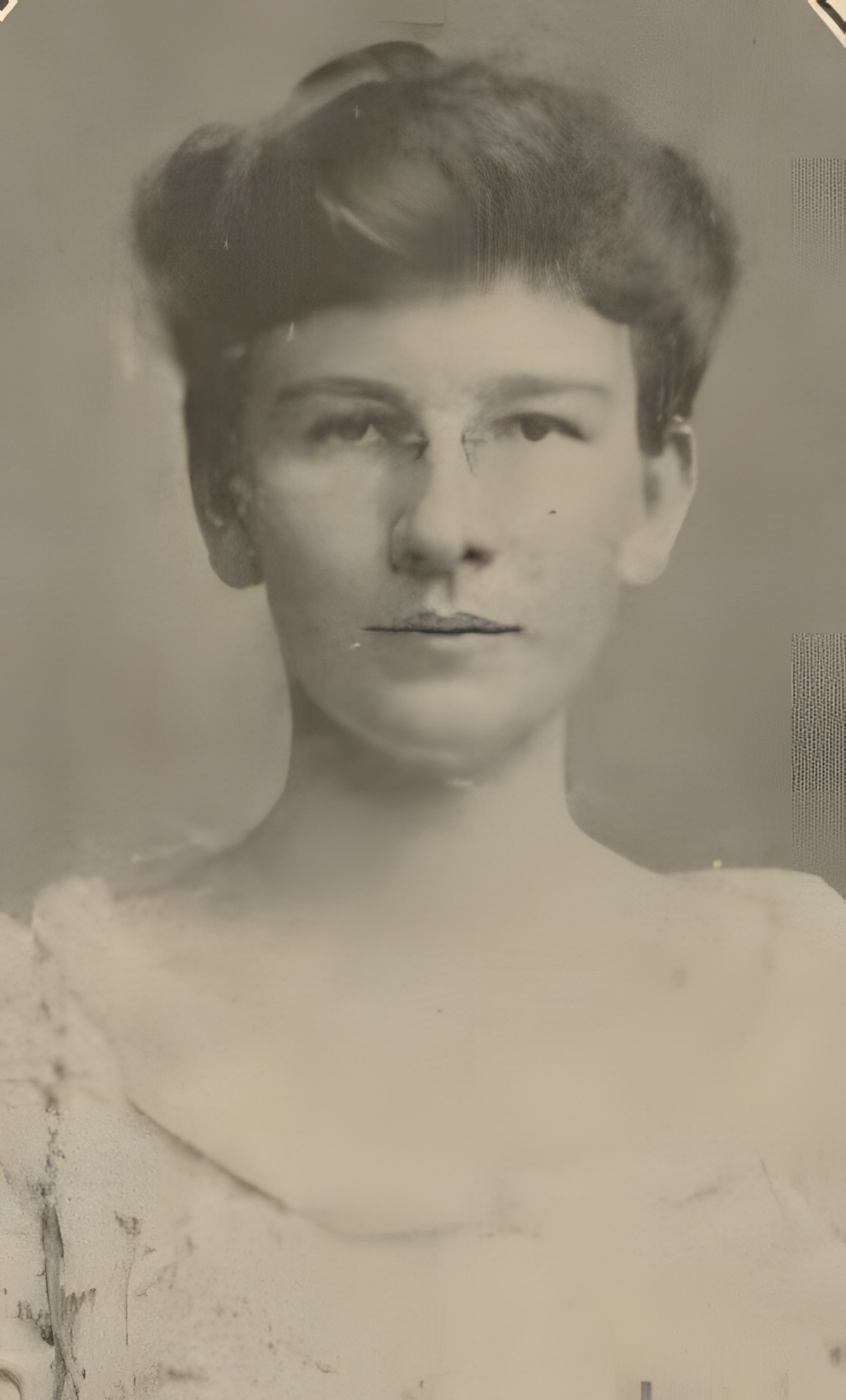
- Marion Reilly in 1910
- Born: July 16, 1879; Altoona, Pennsylvania, U.S.
- Died: January 27, 1928 (aged 48); Philadelphia, Pennsylvania, U.S.
- Education: Bryn Mawr College
- Occupations: Educator, leader in women's higher education
- Known for: Leadership in women's higher education

Marion Reilly (July 16, 1879 – January 27, 1928) was an American educator and leader in women's higher education. Born into a prominent family in Altoona, Pennsylvania, she graduated from Bryn Mawr College in 1901 and continued her studies, specializing in mathematics and physics. Reilly served as the dean of Bryn Mawr College from 1907 to 1916, overseeing a period of expansion and innovation. During her tenure, she introduced groundbreaking programs to advance women's access to education and professional opportunities.

== Biography ==
=== Early life and education ===
Marion Reilly was born on July 16, 1879, in Altoona, Pennsylvania, to John Reilly and Anna Lloyd. Her father, John Reilly, a prominent figure in railroad development and a former U.S. Congressman, moved the family to Philadelphia in 1881. Reilly received her early education at the Agnes Irwin School, a prestigious academic preparatory school for girls in Philadelphia. She pursued her higher education at Bryn Mawr College, graduating with an A.B. degree in 1901. Reilly continued her studies at Bryn Mawr, focusing on mathematics and physics, and she remained at the institution until 1907.

=== Career ===
Marion Reilly began her career as a mathematics instructor at Bryn Mawr College after completing her studies. In 1907, she was appointed as the dean of Bryn Mawr College, a position she held until 1916.

During her tenure as dean, Reilly initiated several programs aimed at expanding educational opportunities for women. She played a significant role in introducing graduate study in education and establishing a professional program in social work at Bryn Mawr. Additionally, she contributed to the expansion of the college's curriculum to include emerging fields of study. Reilly was also actively involved in various academic, social, and civic organizations. She served on the boards of several institutions and participated in shaping educational policies at both local and national levels.

=== Later life and legacy ===
Marion Reilly remained unmarried throughout her life. She died on January 27, 1928, in Philadelphia. She bequeathed her collections of Japanese blockprints and Napoleonic prints to the Brooklyn Museum of Fine Arts in New York. Additionally, she bequeathed $1,000 each to several institutions. These include the Department of Mathematics, the Department of Physics, and the Chinese Scholarship Fund at Bryn Mawr College. Similar amounts were allocated to the Agnes Irwin School and Sophie Irwin Memorial Fund for Teachers, the Bryn Mawr School for Girls at Baltimore, and the Franklin Institute of Pennsylvania.

In recognition of her contributions to women's higher education, several institutions have honored Marion Reilly's memory. These include the establishment of scholarships, awards, and endowed chairs in her name, aimed at supporting students pursuing studies in mathematics, physics, and education.

== Sources ==
=== Books ===
- Best, John Hardin (February 2000). "Reilly, Marion". American National Biography. New York: Oxford University Press. doi:10.1093/anb/9780198606697.article.0900625. (subscription required)
- Jones, Marjorie G. (2008). Frances Yates and the Hermetic Tradition. Lake Worth, Florida: Ibis Press. ISBN 978-0-89254-133-1.

=== Journals ===
- Ponomarenko, V. (2022). "100 years ago this month in the american mathematical monthly". The American Mathematical Monthly. 129 (7): 700. doi:10.1080/00029890.2022.2071571.
