= Daniel J. Morrell =

American politician

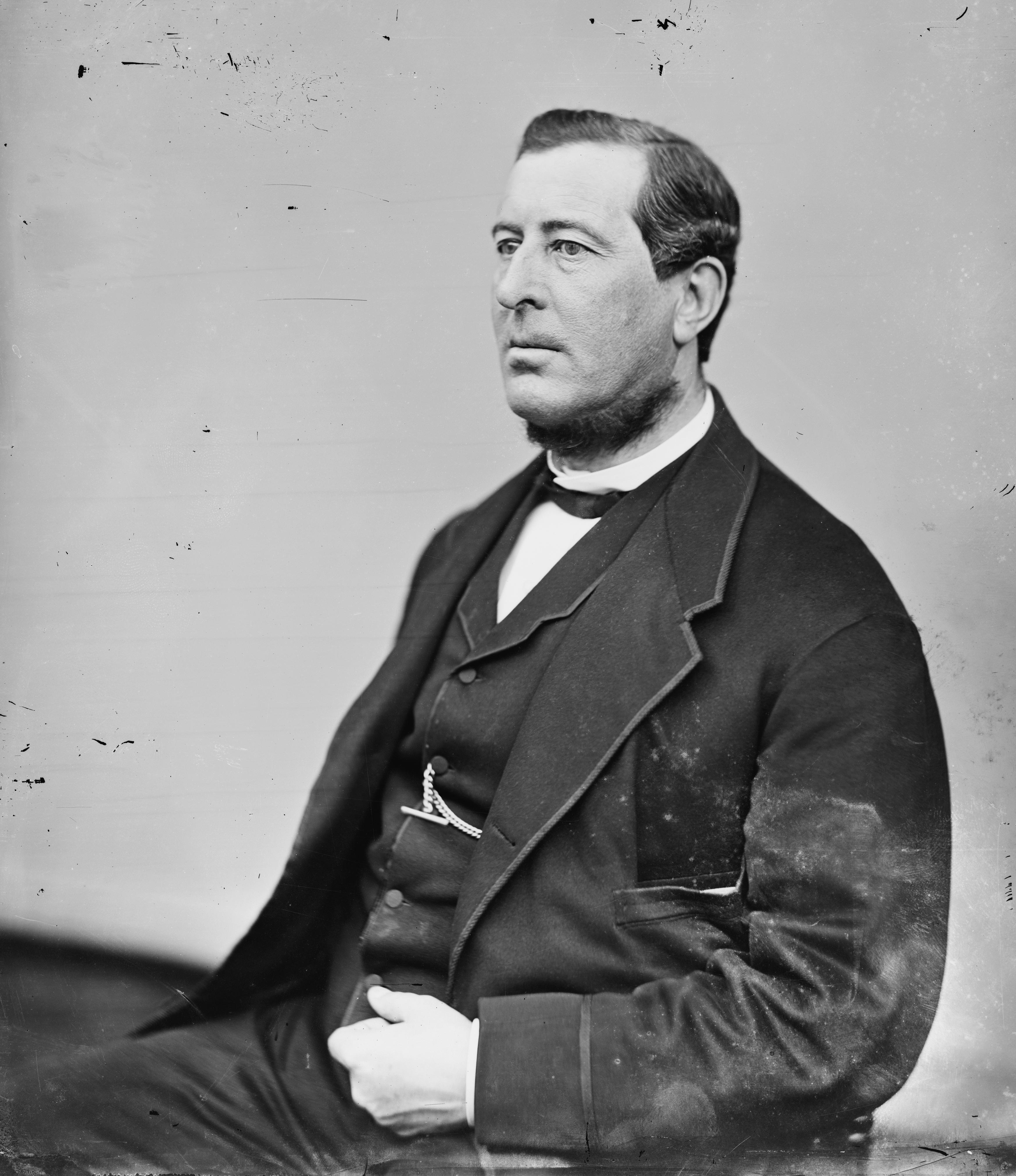
Daniel Johnson Morrell

Daniel Johnson Morrell (August 8, 1821 – August 20, 1885) was a Republican member of the U.S. House of Representatives from Pennsylvania.

== Early life ==
Morrell was born in North Berwick, York County, Maine. He attended public schools. Afterward, he moved south to Philadelphia, Pennsylvania in 1836. He entered a counting room as a clerk. He later engaged in mercantile pursuits.

== Career ==
In 1855 he moved to Johnstown, Pennsylvania. There he became general manager of the Cambria Iron Company, which was the greatest manufacturer of iron and steel in the United States until the 1889 Johnstown Flood.

Morrell also served as president of the local gas and water company from 1860 to 1884, and as president of the First National Bank of Johnstown from 1863 to 1884. He also served as president of the city council for many years.

Morrell was elected as a Republican to the Fortieth and Forty-first Congresses. He served as chairman of the United States House Committee on Manufactures during the Fortieth and Forty-first Congresses. He was an unsuccessful candidate for reelection in 1870. He was appointed as a US commissioner to the Paris Exposition of 1878.

=== Johnstown Flood ===
Morrell became a member of the South Fork Fishing and Hunting Club, an exclusive club made up of elite industrialists and businessmen from Pittsburgh. Its property included the South Fork Dam and its large reservoir, which the club named Lake Conemaugh.

As he had long been based in Johnstown, Morrell knew the dam had failed in 1862. He was concerned about its maintenance through multiple owners and wanted to keep a watchful eye on its stewardship by the club. He repeatedly brought up the issue of dam safety to club officials, especially to co-founder, Benjamin Franklin Ruff. Morrell sent multiple letters to Ruff, expressing his concerns about the dam.

Morrell had insisted on inspections of the dam's breastwork both by his own engineers and those of the Pennsylvania Railroad. Morrell's warnings went unheeded. His offer to make needed repairs, partially at his own expense, was rejected by club president, Benjamin F. Ruff.

Morrell died in 1885. His membership was bought by his colleague, Cyrus Elder, who was legal counsel for the Cambria Iron and Steel Company. Ruff died in 1887.

The dam failed in 1889, causing the great Johnstown Flood of May 31, 1889. It killed more than 2,200 people, and destroyed homes, businesses, and industry in the valleys and city. It was the largest disaster in U.S. history.

== Death and legacy ==
Morrell was again engaged in banking and died on August 20, 1885, in Johnstown, Cambria County, Pennsylvania.

He is the namesake of the ill-fated SS Daniel J. Morrell.

U.S. House of Representatives
Preceded by Abraham A. Barker	Member of the U.S. House of Representatives from Pennsylvania's 17th congressional district 1867–1871	Succeeded by Robert M. Speer
