= John Reilly (Pennsylvania politician) =

Democratic member of the U.S. House of Representatives from Pennsylvania

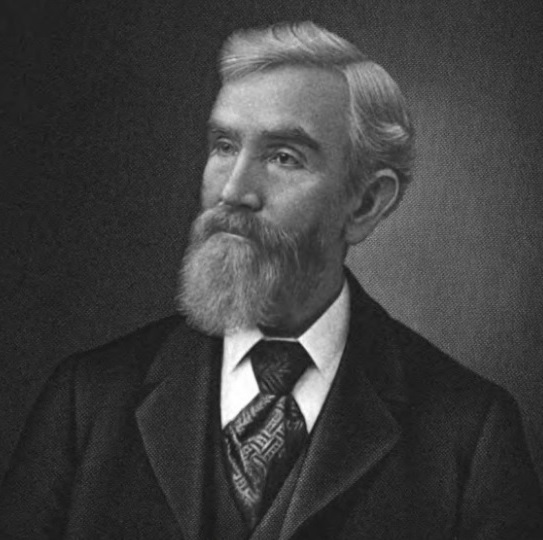
From Volume 13 (1921) of Encyclopedia of Pennsylvania Biography

John Reilly (February 22, 1836 – April 19, 1904) was a Democratic member of the U.S. House of Representatives from Pennsylvania.

== Biography ==
John Reilly was born in Abnerville, Indiana County, Pennsylvania. He received home instruction and attended the public schools. He entered the service of the Pennsylvania Railroad, on April 10, 1854. He was appointed superintendent of transportation April 1, 1865. Furthermore, he served until his resignation in 1875, having been elected to Congress. He served as president of the Bells Gap Railroad from 1871 to 1873 and president of the board of city commissioners of Altoona, Pennsylvania, in 1872 and 1873. He was married to Anna Lloyd. Their daughter, Marion Reilly, was a famous education leader.

Reilly was elected as a Democrat in 1874 to the Forty-fourth Congress. He was an unsuccessful candidate for reelection in 1876. He again served as superintendent of transportation of the Pennsylvania Railroad Company and served from 1877 until his resignation in 1885. He moved to Philadelphia in 1881.He was interested in various business enterprises.

Reilly died in Philadelphia in 1904 and was interred in West Laurel Hill Cemetery in Bala Cynwyd, Pennsylvania.

== Sources ==
- The Political Graveyard

U.S. House of Representatives
Preceded by Robert Milton Speer	Member of the U.S. House of Representatives from Pennsylvania's 17th congressional district 1875–1877	Succeeded by Jacob Miller Campbell
