= Croyle Township, Pennsylvania =

Township in Pennsylvania, US

- Township
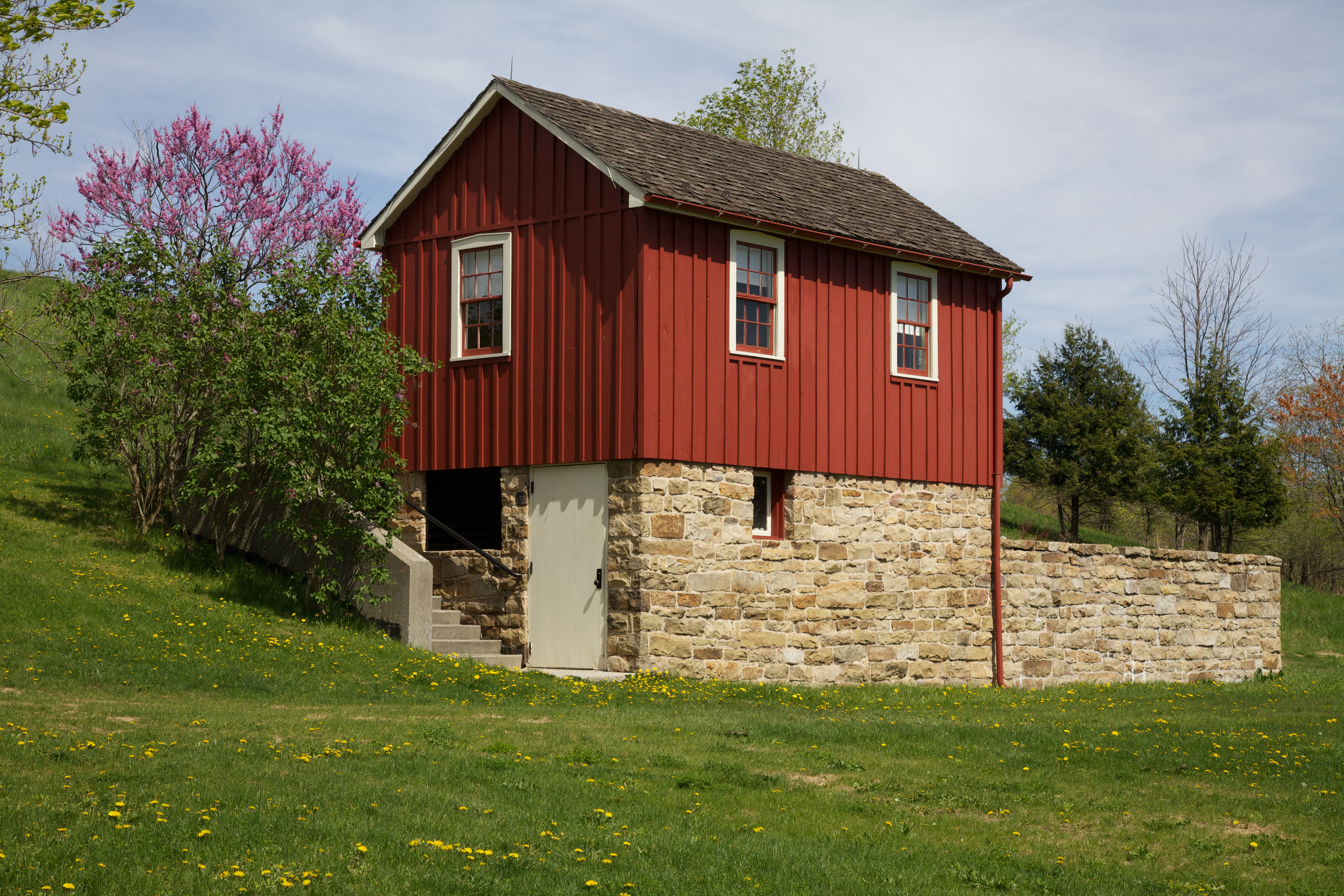
- Elias Unger House at the Johnstown Flood National Memorial

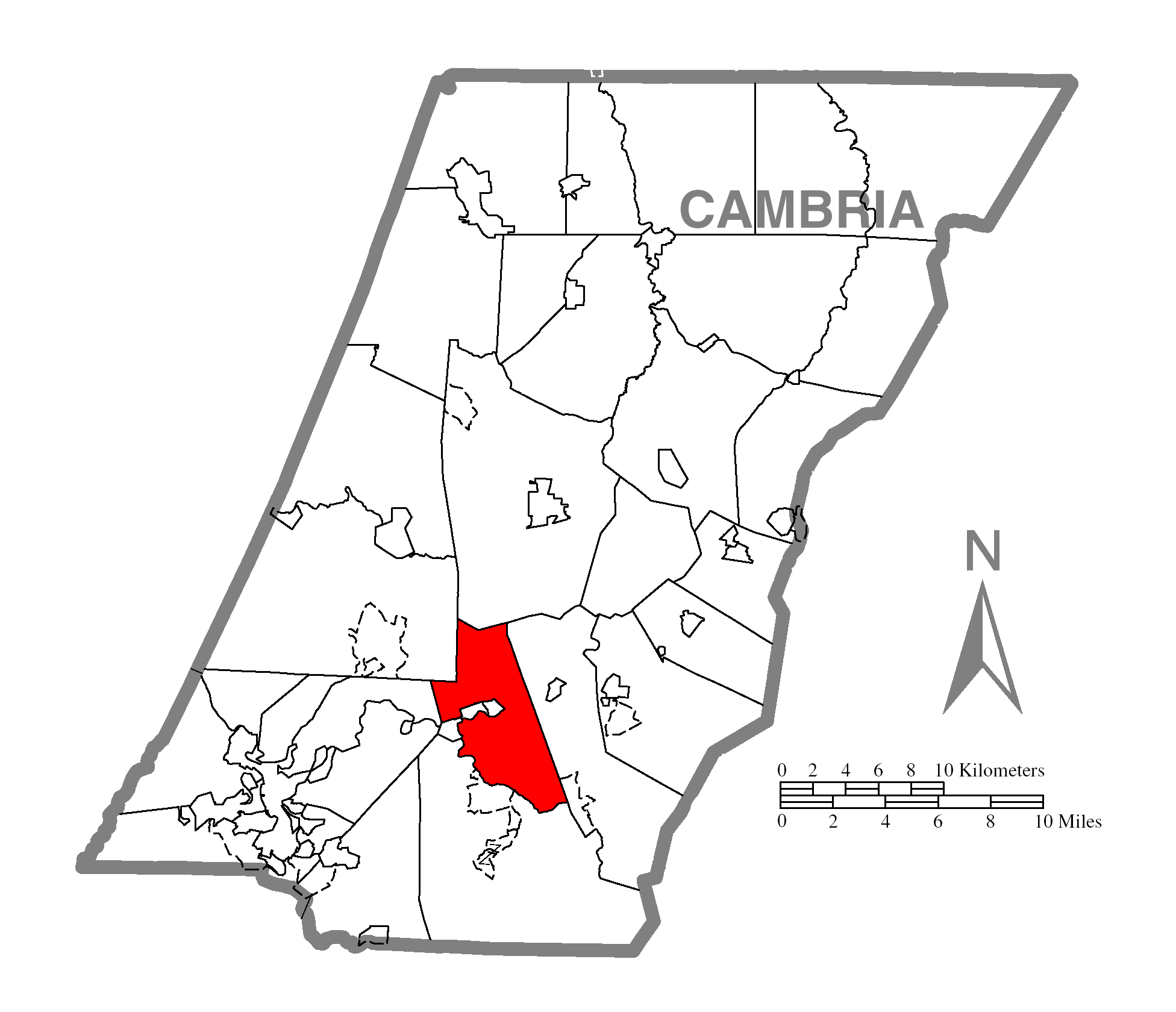
- Map of Cambria County, Pennsylvania highlighting Croyle Township

- Map of Cambria County, Pennsylvania
- Country: United States
- State: Pennsylvania
- County: Cambria
- Settled: 1802
- Incorporated: 1858

Area
  - Total: 18.35 sq mi (47.52 km^{2})
  - Land: 18.32 sq mi (47.45 km^{2})
  - Water: 0.031 sq mi (0.08 km^{2})

Population (2020)
  - Total: 2,307
  - Density: 125.9/sq mi (48.62/km^{2})
- Time zone: UTC-5 (Eastern (EST))
  - Summer (DST): UTC-4 (EDT)
- Area code: 814
- FIPS code: 42-021-17496

Croyle Township is a township in Cambria County, Pennsylvania, United States. It is part of the Johnstown, Pennsylvania Metropolitan Statistical Area. The population was 2,307 at the 2020 census, down from 2,339 at the 2010 census.

== Geography ==
The township is located in southern Cambria County at 40.37° N by 78.75°W, about 14 miles (23 km) northeast of Johnstown and 8 miles (13 km) south of Ebensburg, the county seat. The boroughs of South Fork, Ehrenfeld, and Summerhill lie within the valley of the Little Conemaugh River that crosses the center of the township, but are separate from the township. U.S. Route 219, a four-lane highway, crosses the township from north to south, with access from an interchange with Pennsylvania Route 53 just south of Ehrenfeld.

According to the United States Census Bureau, the township has a total area of 18.35 square miles (47.52 km^{2}), of which 18.32 square miles (47.45 km^{2}) is land and 0.03 square miles (0.08 km^{2}), or 0.16%, is water.

== Communities ==
=== Unincorporated communities ===
- Allendale
- Lovett
- New Germany
- Rockville
- Soukesburg

== Demographics ==
Historical population
Census	Pop.	Note	%±
2000	2,233		—
2010	2,339		4.7%
2020	2,307		−1.4%
U.S. Decennial Census

At the 2000 census there were 2,233 people, 811 households, and 622 families in the township. The population density was 122.2 inhabitants per square mile (47.2/km^{2}). There were 862 housing units at an average density of 47.2 per square mile (18.2/km^{2}). The racial makeup of the township was 99.10% White, 0.13% African American, 0.04% Native American, 0.04% Asian, 0.27% from other races, and 0.40% from two or more races. Hispanic or Latino of any race were 0.31%.

There were 811 households, 31.9% had children under the age of 18 living with them, 66.1% were married couples living together, 6.7% had a female householder with no husband present, and 23.2% were non-families. 20.7% of households were made up of individuals, and 10.1% were one person aged 65 or older. The average household size was 2.75 and the average family size was 3.20.

The age distribution was 25.9% under the age of 18, 7.7% from 18 to 24, 27.8% from 25 to 44, 23.7% from 45 to 64, and 15.0% 65 or older. The median age was 38 years. For every 100 females there were 102.1 males. For every 100 females age 18 and over, there were 100.8 males.

The median household income was $31,250 and the median family income was $37,500. Males had a median income of $28,981 versus $20,121 for females. The per capita income for the township was $14,130. About 7.0% of families and 9.0% of the population were below the poverty line, including 14.8% of those under age 18 and 7.4% of those age 65 or over.
