= South Fork Dam =

Former dam in Pennsylvania

Coordinates: 40.348092°N 78.775730°W

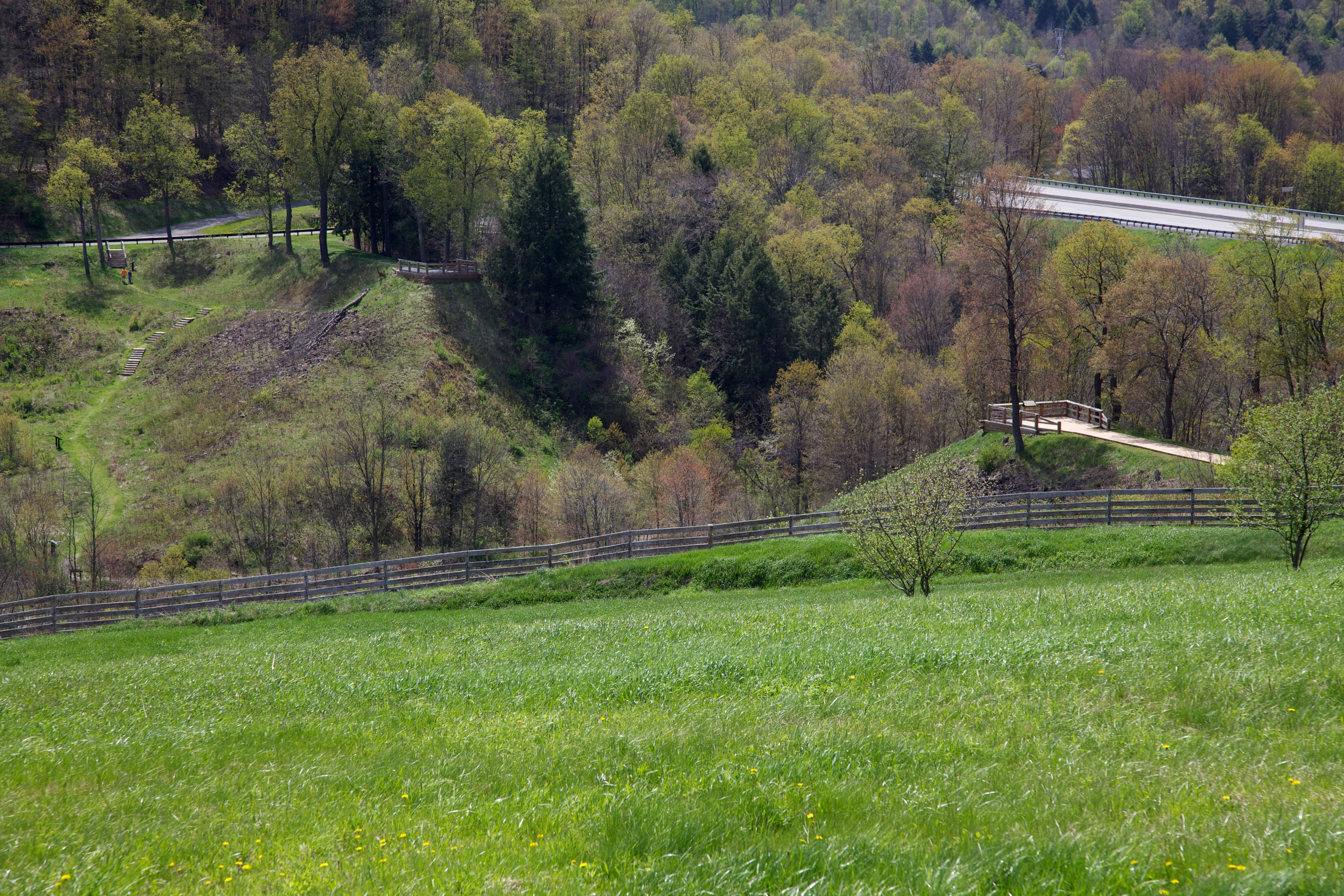
A modern view of the South Fork Dam. The large gap overlooked by the two wooden terraces pictured is the breach that caused the Johnstown Flood.

The South Fork Dam was an earthenwork dam forming Lake Conemaugh (formerly Western Reservoir, also known as the Old Reservoir and Three Mile Dam, a misnomer), an artificial body of water near South Fork, Pennsylvania, United States. On May 31, 1889, the South Fork Dam failed catastrophically and 20 million tons of water from Lake Conemaugh burst through and raced 14 miles (23 km) downstream, causing the Johnstown Flood.

== History ==
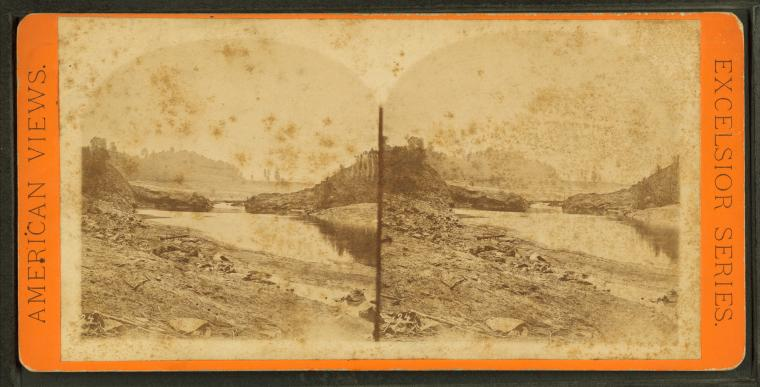
An 1889 stereoscope view of the dam after the flood.

The South Fork Dam was originally built between 1838 and 1853 by the Commonwealth of Pennsylvania as part of the canal system to be used as a reservoir for the state's Main Line of Public Works canal basin in Johnstown. It was abandoned by the Commonwealth, sold to the Pennsylvania Railroad, and sold again to private interests.

The dam was 72 feet (22 m) high and 931 feet (284 m) long. Between 1881 when the South Fork Fishing and Hunting Club was opened, and 1889, the dam frequently sprang leaks. It was patched, mostly with mud and straw. Additionally, a previous owner had removed and sold for scrap the five cast iron discharge pipes that previously allowed a controlled release of water. There had been some speculation as to the dam's integrity, and concerns had been raised by the head of the Cambria Iron Works downstream in Johnstown.

Before the flood, speculators had bought the abandoned reservoir, made less than well-engineered repairs to the old dam, raised the lake level, built cottages and a clubhouse, and created the South Fork Fishing and Hunting Club. Members of this exclusive and secretive retreat in the mountains were 61 wealthy Pittsburgh steel and coal financiers and industrialists, including Andrew Carnegie, Andrew Mellon, Philander Knox, John George Alexander Leishman, and Henry Clay Frick. Daniel Johnson Morrell, of the Cambria Iron Works of Johnstown, also became a member, ostensibly to monitor the condition of the dam.

== Lake Conemaugh ==
=== Dam failure ===
On May 31, 1889, after several days of unprecedented rainfall, the dam gave way. A torrent of water raced downstream, destroying several towns. When it reached Johnstown, 2,208 people were killed, and there was $17 million in damage.

This was the first major disaster relief effort handled by the new American Red Cross, led by Clara Barton. After the flood, victims suffered a series of legal defeats in their attempt to recover damages from the dam's owners. Public indignation at that failure prompted a major development in American law: state courts' move from a fault-based regime to strict liability. The Johnstown Flood became a symbol of the power and potential destructive force of the elements.

Part of the St. Michael neighborhood, and most of Creslo, of the town St. Michael-Sidman, Pennsylvania now sits on the bed of the former Lake Conemaugh.

== See also ==
- Kelly Barnes Dam
