= Atlantic and Pacific Telegraph Company =

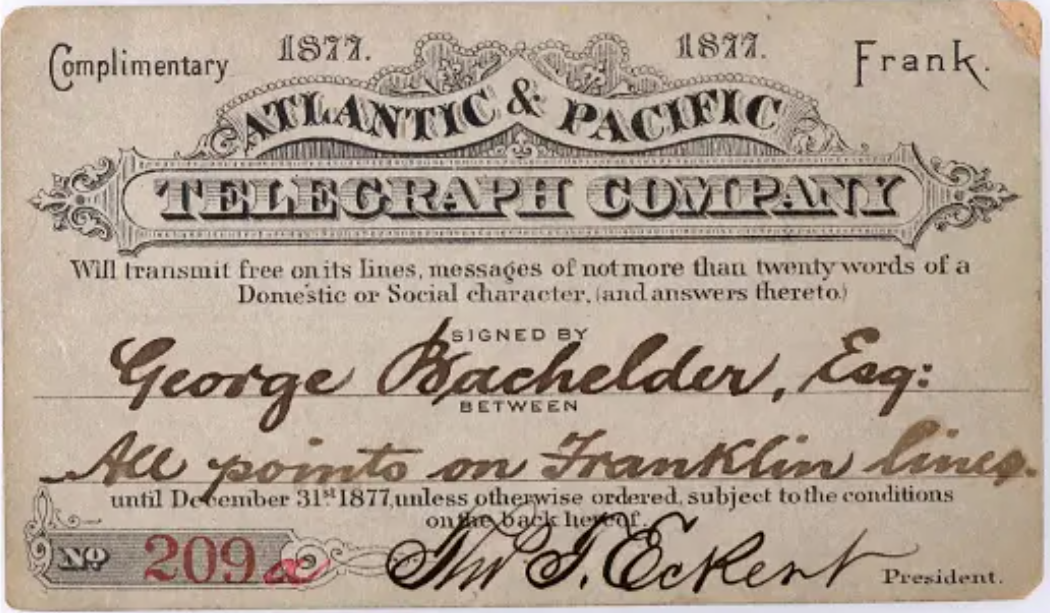
Atlantic and Pacific Telegraph Company, 1877

The Atlantic and Pacific Telegraph Company (A&P) was an American communications company that operated in the 19th century. The Maine Legislature chartered the company in 1854. The company's stated objective was to build a telegraph system extending from the East Coast to the West Coast.

In 1869 A&P leased telegraph lines from the Union Pacific Railroad (UP) and the Central Pacific Railroad, in exchange for company shares. Subsequently, the UP attempted to retake control of the lines in order to lease them to an additional, competing telegraph company, the American Union Telegraph Company. In 1880 the A&P obtained a court injunction to prevent the UP action.

Through several complex transactions, which included patent negotiations with inventor Thomas Edison, financier Jay Gould acquired sufficient shares of A&P stock to obtain control of the company by 1875. (During this time, Gould was also increasing his ownership in the UP, which he ended up controlling by 1880.) Gould's takeover was contested in litigation; meanwhile, Gould initiated a rate war with competing telegraph companies, most notably Western Union, the largest company in the industry. By 1878, Gould had sold the A&P to Western Union at a handsome profit.

== Archives and records ==
- Atlantic & Pacific Telegraph Company subscription list at Baker Library Special Collections, Harvard Business School.
