= Echo Lawn Estate =

Historic house in New York, United States

- U.S. National Register of Historic Places
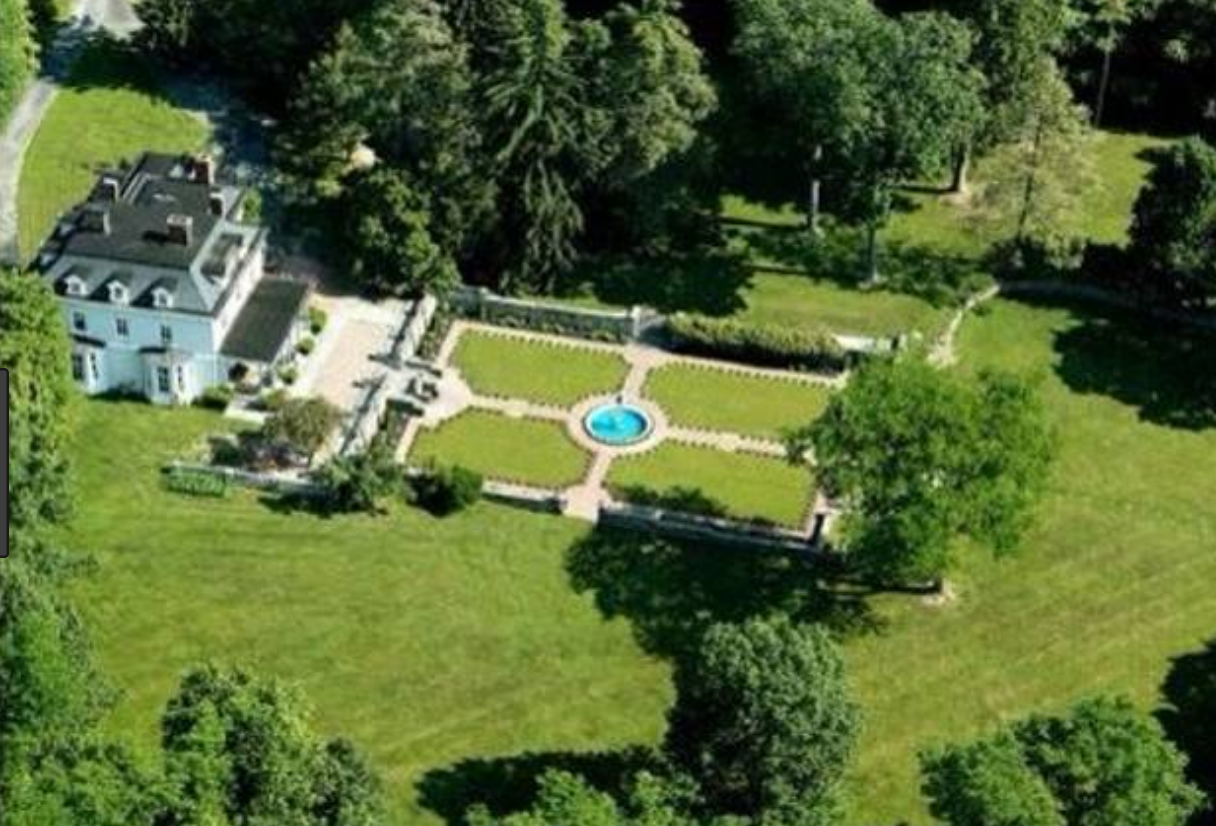

- Location within New York Location within the United States
- Interactive map showing the location of Echo Lawn Estate
- Location: River Road at Stone Gate Drive, Balmville, New York
- Coordinates: 41°32′5″N 74°0′26″W
- Area: 8 acres (3.2 ha)
- Built: 1859
- Architect: Franklin Gerard
- Architectural style: Second Empire
- NRHP reference No.: 09000157
- Added to NRHP: March 23, 2009

Echo Lawn Estate, also known as Stonegate after the Great War, is a historic estate located at Balmville in Orange County, New York. The main house was built about 1860 and is a three-story brick dwelling in the Second Empire style. It features sweeping concave mansard-type roofs. Also on the property is a cluster of mid-19th-century service buildings, an early 20th-century formal garden, and a substantial set of Arts and Crafts inspired gateposts and stone walls.

It was listed on the National Register of Historic Places in 2009.

== History ==
The Echo Lawn Estate remains an important example of mid-nineteenth-century Hudson River Valley estate design, reflecting as it does the Romantic sentiments of the era in its Picturesque-inspired architectural and landscape elements, as well as later changes portraying 20th century design trends. The estate's architectural centerpiece is a large brick masonry dwelling reflecting an early interpretation of the Second Empire style, built in 1859 and distinguished by a graceful bell-cast mansard roof punctuated by dormers and chimneys.

This house illustrates the growing influence of the Second Empire style in American domestic architecture during this period; among the earliest known examples in the United States was the Culbert House on Grand Street in nearby Newburgh, authored by Calvert Vaux in association with his partner and mentor A. J. Downing. Vaux included the Culbert House as Design No. 22 in his 1857 book Villas & Cottages, which also included another Second Empire-style freestanding house, Design No. 25, authored in association with former partner Frederick C. Withers, helping to popularize a style which flourished in the post-Civil War period.

== Description ==
In addition to the Second Empire-style main dwelling, the estate retains a complement of period service buildings, all rendered in frame construction, all reflecting the architectural tenets of the nationally significant Picturesque movement largely popularized in this region through the exertions of Newburgh native and author A. J. Downing; his sometime collaborator the New York City architect A.J. Davis; and former Downing associates Vaux and Withers. These include a carriage barn that is distinguished by board-and-batten sheathing, an intersecting gable trimmed with Gothic Revival-style bargeboard, and a cupola or vent embellished by quatrefoil motifs; a 1 1/2-story gatehouse sheathed in horizontal siding; a board-and-batten sheathed stable with gable embellished with bargeboard; and a frame ice-house with pitched roof, the eaves of which are enlivened by exposed purlins, a typical Picturesque device. There is likewise an original Tutton greenhouse that was restored in 1999. Adding cohesion to these resources is the original carriage road that connects Stonegate Drive with the outbuildings and main dwelling, as well as elements of the original Picturesque-inspired landscape treatments. Only a portion of the carriage mule—which continued further to the south where it again connected with the main road— however survives.

Likewise dating to the early 20th century period, hut nevertheless an integral and significant contributing element of the estate, are the highly artistic Arts & Crafts-inspired gates, which are rendered in stone and brick and which lead from the main road towards the gatehouse and service building complex. These terminate dry-laid rubble stone walls that align this area of the estate. The north side of the former estate also contains a Japanese pond and garden, which like the Italian garden represent subsequent historic landscape developments.

Echo Lawn was built from 1850, for George Augustus Elliot (1820-1888) and his first wife, Harriet Reeve Brown (1830-1850). The mansard roof was added by the Johnes family in 1860 when the house was described as being in Newburgh on the road leading north east from "the Balm of Gillead tree" from which Balmville takes its name. It was the childhood home of Mrs Natalie Knowlton Blair, later credited as, "the earliest woman collector of Americana of the first rank," before being sold to the Beal family. Natalie Knowlton Blair, was an influential early collector of American decorative arts and a significant contributor to the American Wing of the Metropolitan Museum of Art. The American impressionist painters Reynolds Beal (1866– 1951) and Gifford Beal (1879–1956) helped design the formal garden, and converted the carriage house into their studio. In 1914 the silent movie, "The Scales of Justice" was filmed here. Echo Lawn is now known as Villa Stonegate and the outbuildings are known as Stonegate Farm. It was added to the National Register of Historic Places in 2009 and remains privately owned.

The formal gardens of the estate are included in the Smithsonian's Archives of American Gardens. Echo Lawn is among the last substantially intact 19th-century estates in the Balmville area, is situated directly across from Morningside, a Picturesque Gothic Revival-style house designed for Frederick Deming by Withers and built in 1859; additional historic estates adjacent to it include the Willellyn estate once owned by William Beal, and the former J. W. Thomas estate. Echo Lawn was historically situated immediately west of the Algonac estate, home of the Delano family, and long-since lost and developed.
