= Marjorie Acker Phillips =

American impressionist painter and art collector (1894–1985)

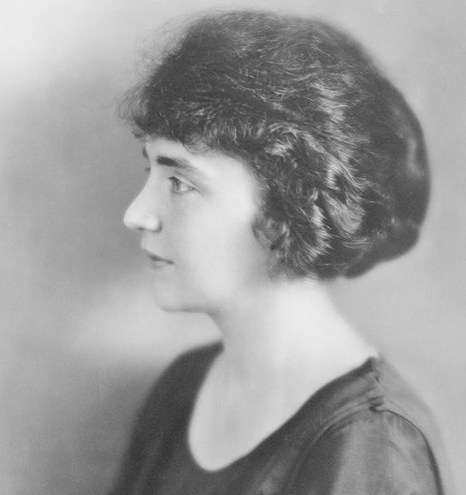
- Marjorie Acker Phillips, ca. 1920
- Born: Marjorie Acker; October 25, 1894; Bourbon, Indiana
- Died: June 19, 1985 (aged 90); Washington, D.C.
- Education: Art Students League
- Known for: Painting
- Movement: Impressionism

Marjorie Acker Phillips (October 25, 1894 – June 19, 1985) was an American Impressionist painter and art collector. She co-founded the Phillips Collection with her husband, Duncan Phillips.

== Early life and education ==
She was born Marjorie Acker in Bourbon, Indiana. She was the sister to six other siblings. Her parents were Charles Ernest Acker and Alice Beal. She was raised in Ossining, New York. Phillips started drawing as a child. Her uncles were Reynolds Beal and Gifford Beal. Both men noticed Phillips artistic ability and suggested she pursue art as a career path. She began attending the Art Students League in 1915 and graduated in 1918. She studied under Boardman Robinson.

== Mid-life and career ==
Marjorie Phillips has the unmistakable style of the born painter. – Duncan Phillips

Phillips is quoted as stating that she "didn't want to paint depressing pictures." She painted primarily landscapes and still life works. Despite living a socialite lifestyle alongside her husband, Phillips made the effort to paint every morning in her Washington, D.C., studio.

=== Fine art, family and the Phillips Collection ===
She attended an art exhibition for Duncan Phillips at the Century Association in January, 1921. She met Duncan, and the two married in October of that year. Duncan was an art collector, and the couple expanded their collecting. Phillips moved to Washington, D.C., and into Duncan's Dupont Circle mansion. Duncan's mother also lived at the mansion. Phillips gave birth to her first child with Duncan, Mary Marjorie.

While visiting France in 1923, Phillips became interested in Impressionism. She found inspiration in the work of Pierre-Auguste Renoir and Paul Cézanne. She didn't only find inspiration in their work, but the couple began collecting their work. During that 1923 trip, they purchased Renoir's Luncheon of the Boating Party for $125,000. In 1924, their second and final child, Laughlin, is born.

In 1930, the couple had collected so much artwork that they had to leave the mansion, with the art, and move into a nearby house in the Foxhall neighborhood. The house was named "Dunmarlin". The couple had a summer home in Ebensburg, Pennsylvania. It was called Ormsby Lodge and Carriage House. Duncan died in 1966. In total, the couple had collected over 2,500 works of art, many which were on display at the museum. After his death, Phillips, who served as Associate Director of the Phillips Collection, became Director. Her work was also part of the painting event in the art competition at the 1932 Summer Olympics.

== Later life and legacy ==
In 1971 she curated a retrospective about Paul Cézanne and published the book, Duncan Phillips and His Collection. Phillips retired in 1972. Her son, Laughlin Phillips, became Director of the Phillips Collection.

She produced more than 400 paintings and drawings, the last in 1982.

Phillips donated a piece of property in Martha's Vineyard to the Sheriff's Meadow Foundation in 1980. The property, which became a nature conservancy, was named Phillips Preserve. She died in 1985 of pulmonary failure.

The Phillips family papers are held in the collection of the Heinz History Center. The Winterthur Museum, Garden and Library has a holding of archival materials of Phillips'.

== Major exhibitions ==
- Solo show, 1925, Phillips Collection, Washington, D.C.

== Major collections ==
- Strawberry Picnic, ca. 1924, Phillips Collection, Washington, D.C.
- Bohemian Glass Vase, 1939, Museum of Fine Arts, Boston, Boston, Massachusetts
