= Ebensburg, Pennsylvania =

Borough in Pennsylvania, US

- Borough
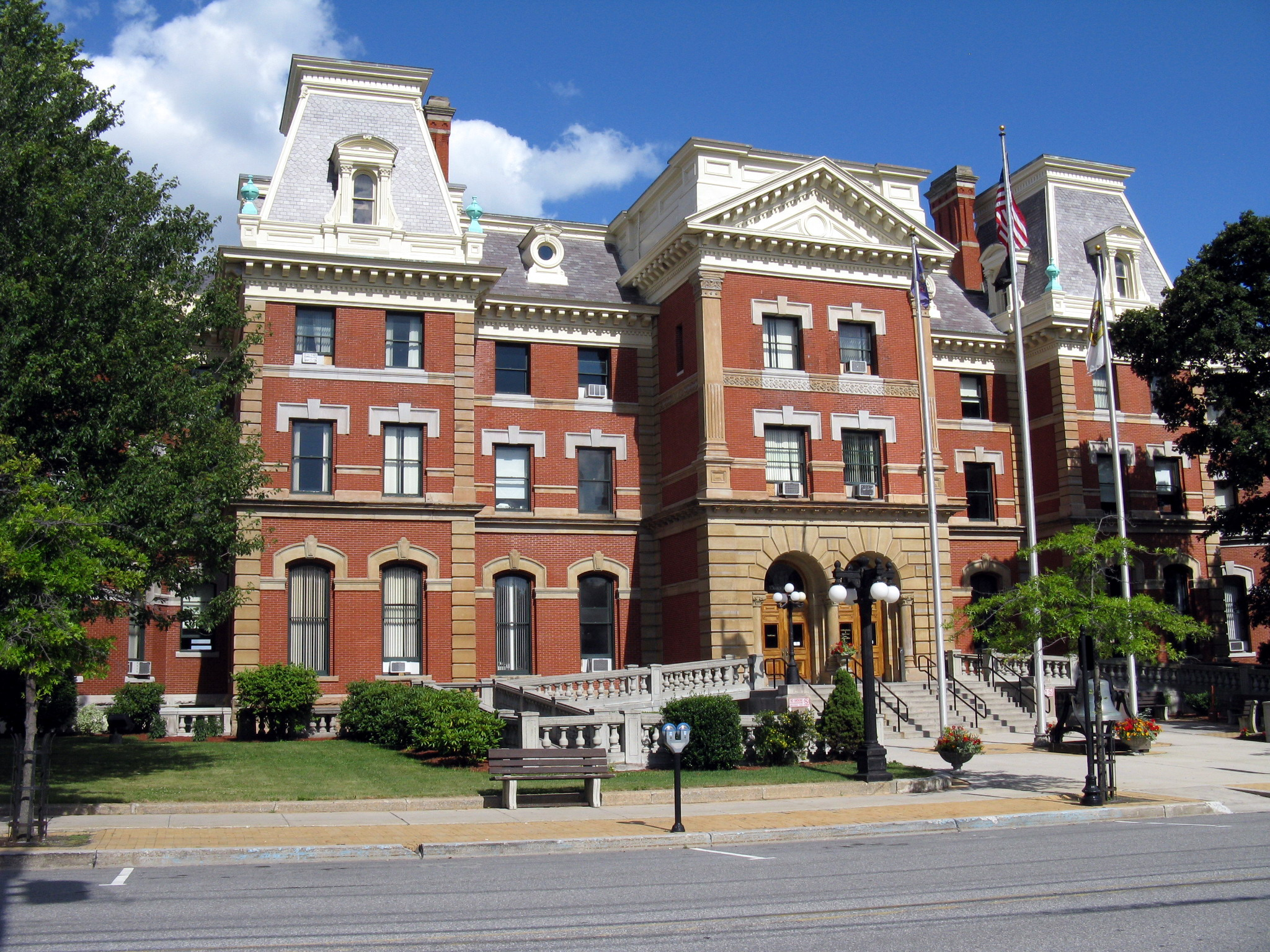
- The Cambria County Courthouse in Ebensburg

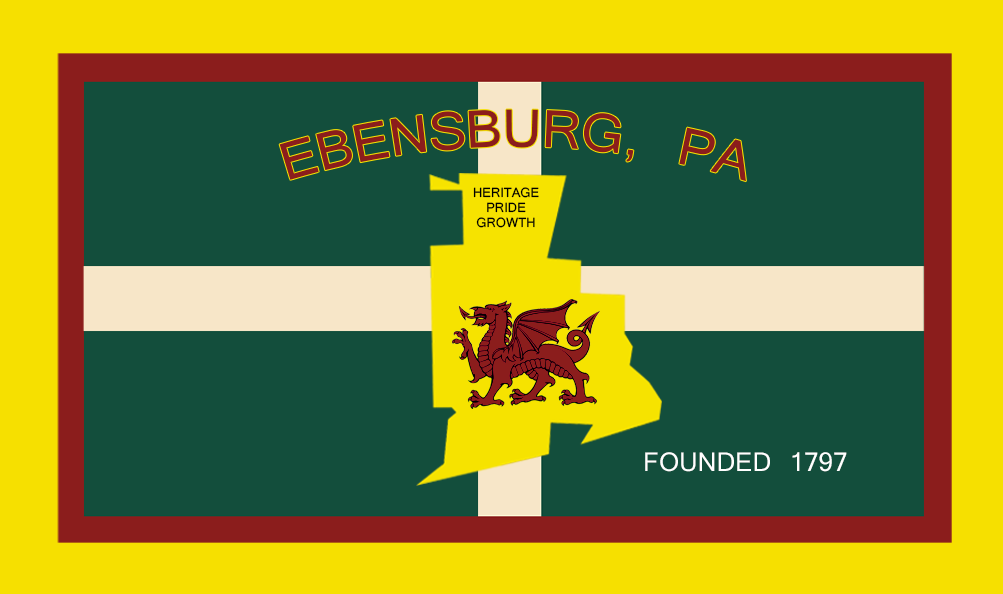
- Flag Seal
- Motto: Crossroads of Cambria
- Location of Ebensburg in Cambria County, Pennsylvania.

- Location within Pennsylvania
- Coordinates: 40°29′11″N 78°43′32″W
- Country: United States
- State: Pennsylvania
- County: Cambria
- Settled: 1796
- Incorporated: 1825

Government
  - Type: Borough council
  - Mayor: Randy Datsko

Area
  - Total: 1.72 sq mi (4.46 km^{2})
  - Land: 1.69 sq mi (4.37 km^{2})
  - Water: 0.031 sq mi (0.08 km^{2})
- Elevation: 2,152 ft (656 m)

Population (2020)
  - Total: 3,404
  - Density: 2,016.5/sq mi (778.57/km^{2})
- Time zone: UTC-5 (Eastern (EST))
  - Summer (DST): UTC-4 (EDT)
- ZIP code: 15931
- Area code: 814
- FIPS code: 42-22144
- GNIS feature ID: 1215018
- Website: www.ebensburgpa.com

Ebensburg is a borough and the county seat of Cambria County in the U.S. state of Pennsylvania. It is located 25 miles (40 km) west of Altoona and surrounded by Cambria Township. It is situated in the Allegheny Mountains at about 2,140 feet (650 m) above sea level. Ebensburg is located in a rich bituminous coal region. In the past, sawmills, tanneries, wool mills, and a foundry operated there. The number of residents in 1900 was 1,574, and in 1910, 1,978. As of the 2020 census, Ebensburg had a population of 3,404. It is part of the Johnstown, Pennsylvania Metropolitan Statistical Area.

Ending in Ebensburg is the Ghost Town Trail, a rail trail established in 1991 on the right-of-way of the former Ebensburg and Black Lick Railroad. Also of note, next to the old Cambria County Jail, is the Veterans Park of Cambria County honoring the men from Cambria County who fought in the Revolutionary War, War of 1812, Mexican-American War, Civil War, and the Spanish-American War.

== History ==
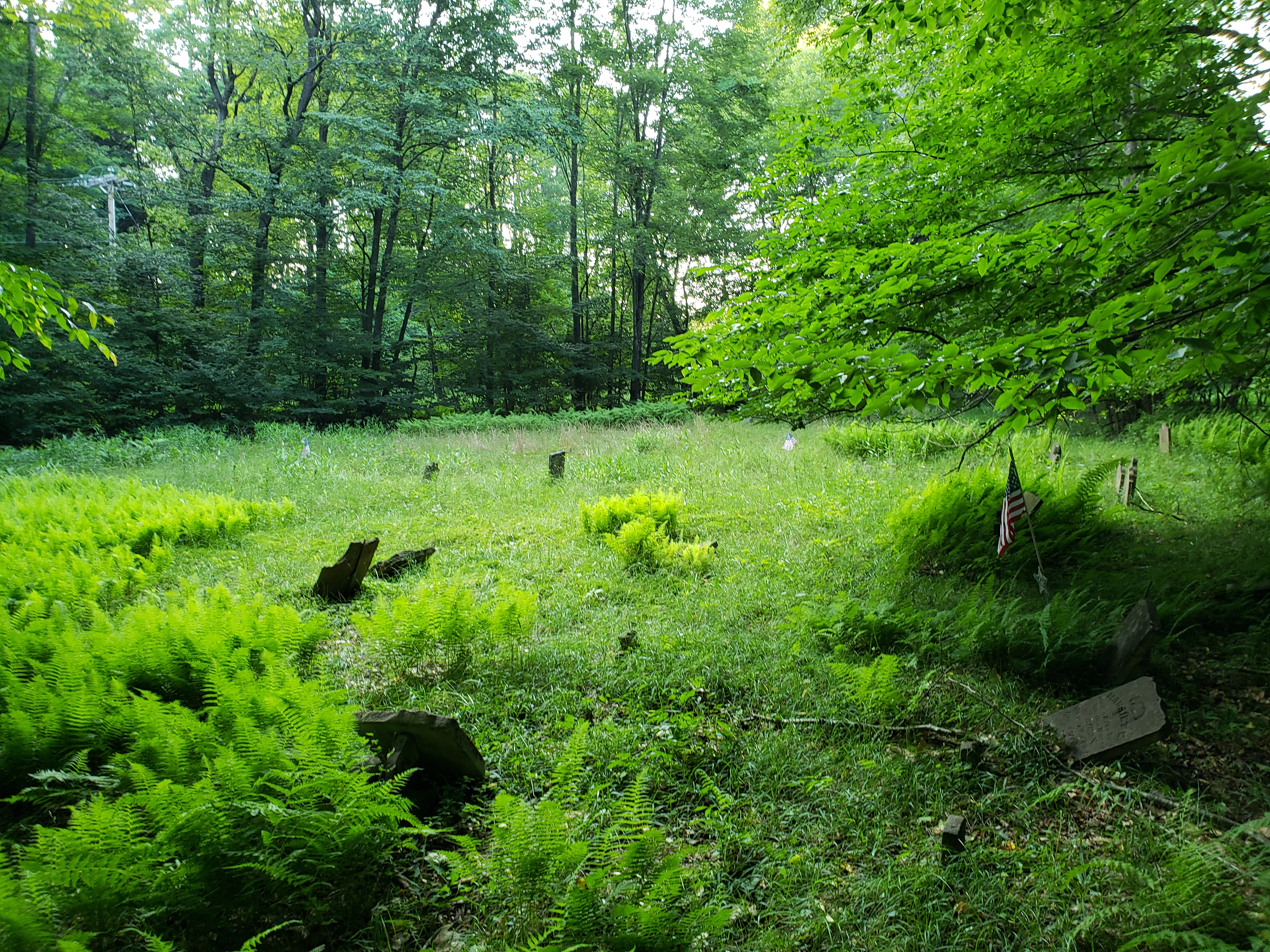
Beulah Cemetery west of Ebensburg.

Ebensburg originated in November 1796, when Congregational minister Rees Lloyd led a small party of 20 Welsh people from Philadelphia to the lands that Morgan John Rhees had chosen for his colony. They selected an attractive spot in the tops of the Allegheny Mountains and settled what would become Ebensburg. They named it for the minister's son Eben Lloyd, who had died in childhood.

Lloyd offered land to the government in exchange for Ebensburg becoming the county seat, which the government accepted. A nearby settlement by the name of Beula, Pennsylvania, had sprouted just to the west of the town, with its own intentions of becoming the county seat. With the decision made, Beula faded into obscurity. All that remains is its old cemetery.

Ebensburg was described in the 1940 Pennsylvania guide as being:

[S]ituated on a rise with streets sloping from its center...founded in the early 1800s by the Reverend Rees Lloyd, a religious dissenter and leader of Welsh immigrants. Ebensburg was chosen as the county seat in 1805 when it was found to be at the geographical center of Cambria County. In 1842 it was still a rarity to have church services here conducted in English rather than the ancient Cambrian tongue. Once a popular resort, Ebensburg is now largely dependent on agriculture, though many residents work in neighboring mines.

— Federal Writers'Project, "Part III: Tours, Pennsylvania: A Guide to the Keystone State (1940)

According to the book Cambria County Pioneers (1910), a General William Rudolph Smith, son of William Rudolph Smith, and referred to as "Captain" by residents, lived in the town of Ebensburg, Pennsylvania in the 1840s. He raised a Company of men known as the Cambria Guards who would serve in the Mexican–American War, but Smith could not go. He was "universally accepted as an authority in literary matters and upon historical subjects particularly he was a veritable encyclopedia. His literary style was forcible, direct, and elegant."

The Company he raised would embark to the South in January 1847, becoming Company D of the Second Regiment of Pennsylvania Volunteers, called the Highlanders and had "a very pleasant trip" on their way to New Orleans. They did not see combat until August that year as smallpox put the company in quarantine. Shortly after their release, they saw heavy combat at Contreras, Churubusco, and Chapultepec. Following this they were encamped at a Monastery until 1848 when they returned to Ebensburg.

Because of its location, Ebensburg became the crossroads of roads heading north and south and east to west. Some of the highest traffic passed through here during the gold rush in the West of the late 1840s, and beyond.

Because of those travelers to the West, an apartment building situated on the corner of Phaney and East High Streets in town was known as "The California House." It operated for years as an inn and tavern, and housed thousands of travelers heading west to find their fortunes. A young local boy called William J. Wherry joined a caravan west. He wrote detailed accounts of his journey in the form of letters to his sister, and claimed to have crossed 600 miles of plains alone on his way to California.

However, as transport evolved, the railroad became a popular and efficient mode of transportation. Railroads were popular in the nearby town of Cresson, but no main line of railroad ran through Ebensburg. But in 1862, a branch called the "Ebensburg Cresson Rail Road" was built into Ebensburg. Observers said that although Ebensburg was "industrious and sophisticated in character," it was not going to be an industrial town given its location and geography.

Ebensburg had some connections to the Underground Railroad before the war. Abraham A. Barker was involved in the national Abolitionist movement before arriving in Ebensburg. He moved to town in 1856 to try to profit from its lucrative lumber industry.

Barker lived in a log structure on the Northwestern corner of Locust and High Streets. Prior to the Civil War, he assisted a slave brought to him from Bedford on his escape to freedom. The fugitive stayed in his house overnight and was taken a few miles out of Ebensburg the next morning by being hidden under a buffalo robe on a sled. According to many townsfolk, Barker was close friends with Abraham Lincoln. He had attended the Chicago Convention of 1860 to nominate Lincoln for the presidency. Barker was later elected to Congress.

== Civil War ==
During the Civil War, men from Ebensburg served in the 133rd Pennsylvania Volunteer Infantry (particularly companies A, B and F). They fought in Allabach's brigade (Humphreys' 3rd Division) at Fredericksburg and Chancellorsville. In the Battle of Fredericksburg on December 13, 1862, the 133rd participated in the final charge on Marye's Heights, suffering heavy losses. As well, Company A – known as the Cambria Guards – of the 11th Pennsylvania Reserves hailed from Ebensburg and surrounding towns in Cambria County. This company was about 80 men strong, and its captain was Robert Litzinger of Ebensburg. The 11th Pennsylvania Reserves saw action at the Battle of South Mountain, The Battle of Antietam, and the Battle of Gettysburg. Particularly on the second day's fight at Gettysburg, the 11th participated in a counter-assault down the face of Little Round Top into The Wheatfield to drive out Confederates.

Two Ebensburg men received the Medal of Honor in the Civil War: Thomas Evans of Company D, and James Snedden from Company E of the 54th Pennsylvania. Evans "wrested the colors from a color bearer of a Tennessee regiment [sic], sending the color bearer to the rear." Evans is buried at Bethel Cemetery in Ebensburg.

== Postwar prosperity ==
In the years following the Civil War, Ebensburg flourished, and became a prosperous town. The wealthy built grand homes to flank the streets, their lavish carriages rolled down the roads, and local gentleman formed a debate club that met regularly in lounges in the town.

The mountain town, high in the Alleghenies, attracted Pittsburgh socialites who flocked here to escape the dirty, loud and sickly streets of the industrial city. Locals realized the town's allure; entrepreneurs wrote promotional pamphlets extolling the town's "many days of bright sunshine, its pure artesian well water, its health giving atmosphere, its splendid surroundings - absolutely free from smoke and dust... the town is remarkably free from the ills which plague so many localities." This promise of healthy life in the peaks of Ebensburg lured many who could afford so-called "summer cottages" -some were built to a scale akin to mansions. The first wave of tourism was housed in newly built, prominent hotels in grandiose Victorian style that had been developed across town.

The Maple Park Springs Hotel sat on a hill in the Northwest corner of town, on a tract of land known as "Lloyds Grove." Altoona musician J.W. Leman wrote the "Maple Park March Two-Step" for the hotel. Wealthier townspeople started building their own Victorian homes, and the socialites began to arrive with funds to claim their own slivers of mountain paradise.

Among the new buildings was Ormsby Lodge, owned by the Phillips Family. Built in 1889 by Duncan Phillips, a prominent art collector, the lodge was an 18-room Eastlake style, Victorian "cottage" built on the former Belmont Tract of land. Artist Marjorie Acker Phillips, wife of Duncan Phillips, typically summered with her family at the Ormsby estate.

Another summer cottage was the Bissel Home, which was designed by architect Stanford White, who also designed Madison Square Garden.

David Park of Pittsburgh bought the Maple Park Springs Hotel and built his own mansion in town. The Johnstown Democrat wrote of the town around this time "that delightful village" of Ebensburg "In many respects is more attractive than Cresson... and it may be truthfully added that its complement of pretty girls is alone enough to give it enviable fame."

Residents and visitors' enjoyment was interrupted in 1889 when they heard news that the city of Johnstown to the south was devastated by a deadly flood after an earthen dam had failed.

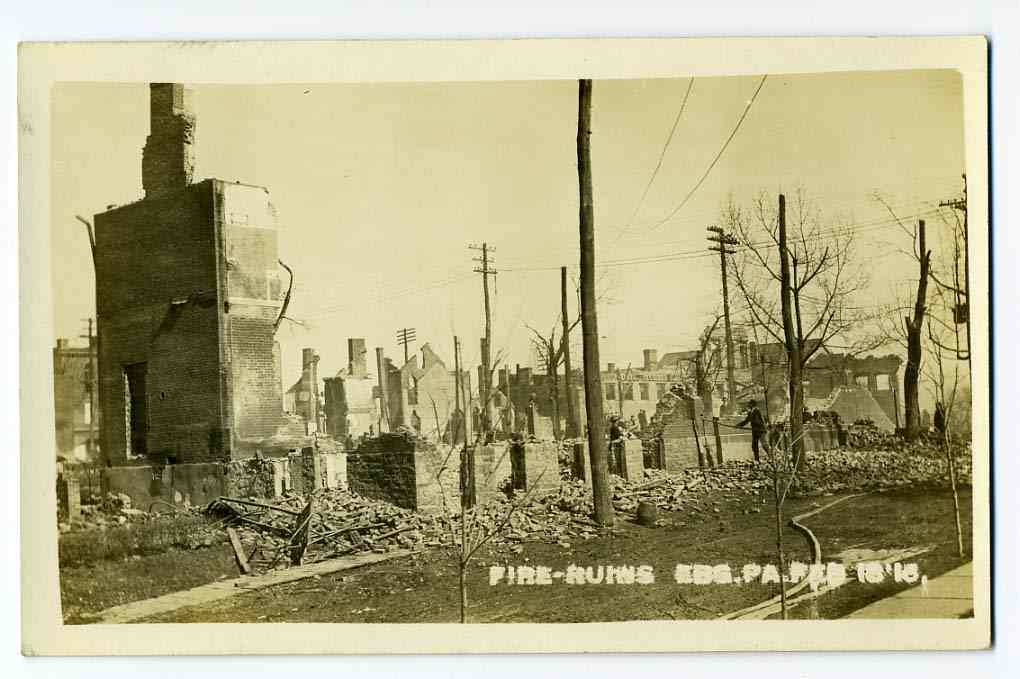
Fire damage in downtown Ebensburg from the 1915 fire.

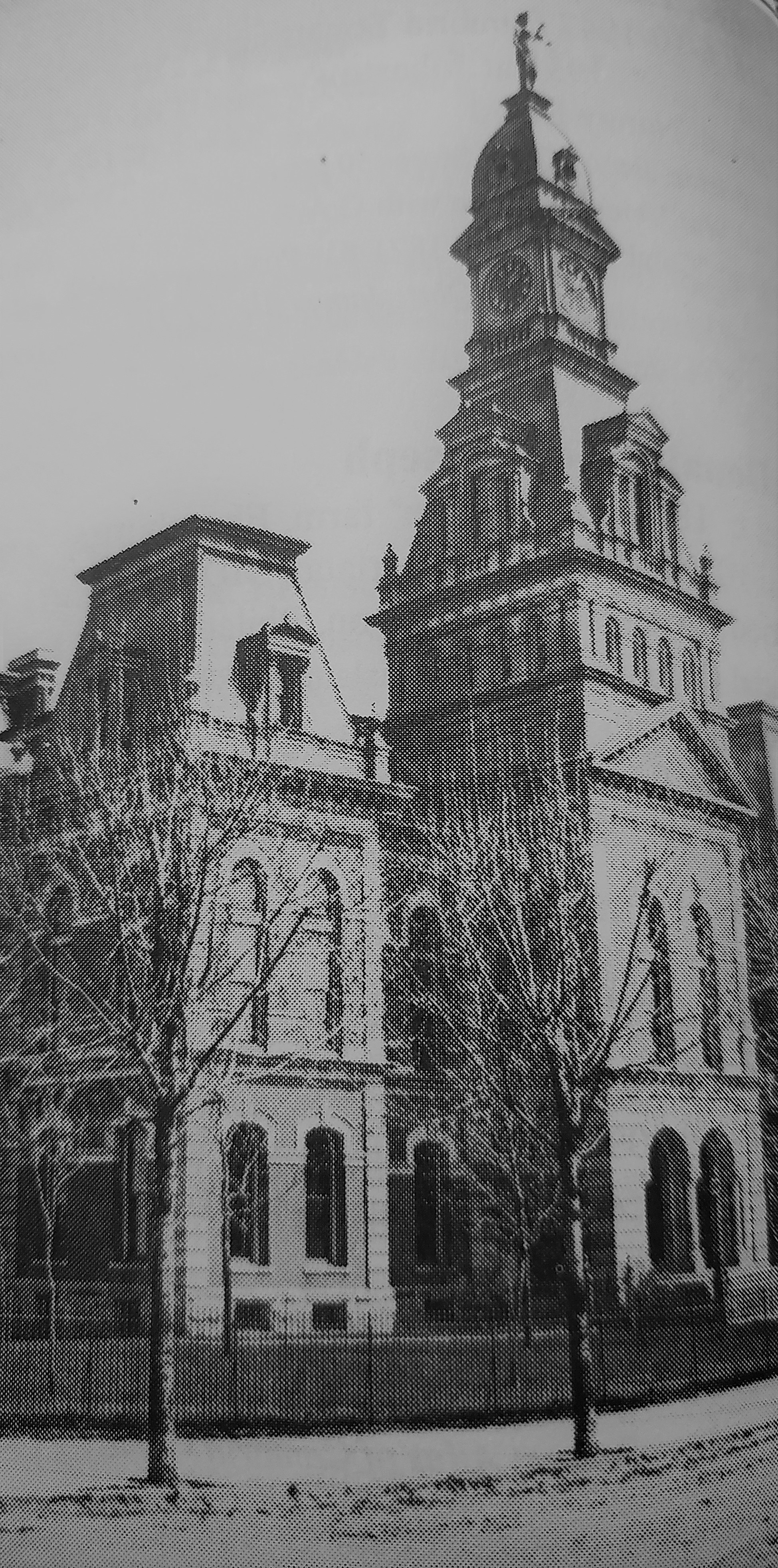
The Cambria County Courthouse as seen from South Center Street in the late 19th century. Built in Victorian style, it features a clocktower, and a statue of Justice at its peak. Cambria County Historical Society

In February 1915 most of downtown Ebensburg was burned down

"by fire which broke out in the pool room of the Mountain House. Every building in the block from the Mountain House to the county court house was destroyed. The loss is estimated between $250,000 and $300,000. The court house was not damaged although the buildings adjoining were destroyed. Fire companies from many northern Cambria towns were summoned to assist the Ebensburg company. The Johnstown city fire department also went to the scene. The buildings destroyed include the fine building of the Cambria Savings and company, several hotels, a livery barn, a bank building and a number of small office buildings. The telephone communications were cut off. The buildings destroyed were thirteen in number. A cigarette dropped in the poolroom the night previous is believed to have started the fire."

According to The Indiana Progress, "Several buildings were dynamited to prevent the spread of the flames." The lowest cost estimate of losses was $250,000; the equivalent in 2020 of $6,402,920.79.

Despite the fire, a number of historic homes and buildings survived. Townspeople recognized the value of these and defined an historic district, identifying which buildings were of quality that contributed to its fabric. In 2019 the significance of The Ebensburg Historic District was recognized when it was added to the National Register of Historic Places. The District is bounded roughly by Highland Avenue and West, Sugar, and Triumph streets.

== Art ==
Impressionist painter Marjorie Acker Phillips, who had a summer home in Ebensburg known as the Ormsby Lodge, is thought to have drawn inspiration from the nearby countryside for many of her paintings.

== Education ==
It is in the Central Cambria School District..

In the borough of Ebensburg, there are three public and two private schools. The two private schools are Bishop Carroll High School and Holy Name Elementary. The public schools are Cambria High School, Central Cambria Middle School, and Cambria Elementary. The fourth school of the Central Cambria School District is located about 5 miles (8.0 km) west of the borough, off US Route 22. At the collegiate level, the Pennsylvania Highland Community College has one of their satellite sites about 2 miles (3.2 km) southwest of the center of town, also off Route 22.

== Geography ==
Ebensburg is located in the center of Cambria County at 40°29′11″N 78°43′32″W (40.486388, -78.725461).

Three U.S. highways pass through and intersect around Ebensburg: U.S. Route 22 runs along the southern border of the borough, leading east 18 miles (29 km) to Hollidaysburg, south of Altoona, and west 72 miles (116 km) to Pittsburgh. U.S. Route 219 bypasses the borough to the west, with access from two exits (U.S. 22 and U.S. 422). US 219 leads north 58 miles (93 km) to DuBois and south 41 miles (66 km) to Somerset. Finally, the western portion of U.S. Route 422 begins at US 219 on the west side of Ebensburg and leads west 26 miles (42 km) to the borough of Indiana. Johnstown, the largest city in Cambria County, is 22 miles (35 km) to the southwest via US 219 and Pennsylvania Route 56.

According to the United States Census Bureau, the borough of Ebensburg has a total area of 1.7 square miles (4.4 km^{2}), of which 1.7 square miles (4.3 km^{2}) is land and 0.04 square miles (0.1 km^{2}), or 2.13%, is water.

=== Climate ===
Climate data for Ebensburg, Pennsylvania (1991–2020 normals, extremes 1964–present)
Month	Jan	Feb	Mar	Apr	May	Jun	Jul	Aug	Sep	Oct	Nov	Dec	Year
Record high °F (°C)	67 (19)	75 (24)	83 (28)	89 (32)	90 (32)	92 (33)	99 (37)	94 (34)	91 (33)	85 (29)	78 (26)	71 (22)	99 (37)
Mean daily maximum °F (°C)	32.7 (0.4)	35.9 (2.2)	45.0 (7.2)	58.4 (14.7)	67.8 (19.9)	75.1 (23.9)	78.7 (25.9)	77.3 (25.2)	71.3 (21.8)	60.0 (15.6)	47.7 (8.7)	37.0 (2.8)	57.2 (14.0)
Daily mean °F (°C)	24.3 (−4.3)	26.3 (−3.2)	34.3 (1.3)	46.0 (7.8)	55.7 (13.2)	63.6 (17.6)	67.5 (19.7)	66.0 (18.9)	59.7 (15.4)	48.7 (9.3)	38.1 (3.4)	29.2 (−1.6)	46.6 (8.1)
Mean daily minimum °F (°C)	15.9 (−8.9)	16.8 (−8.4)	23.6 (−4.7)	33.5 (0.8)	43.6 (6.4)	52.1 (11.2)	56.3 (13.5)	54.7 (12.6)	48.1 (8.9)	37.5 (3.1)	28.4 (−2.0)	21.5 (−5.8)	36.0 (2.2)
Record low °F (°C)	−28 (−33)	−22 (−30)	−16 (−27)	3 (−16)	20 (−7)	28 (−2)	35 (2)	30 (−1)	23 (−5)	12 (−11)	0 (−18)	−20 (−29)	−28 (−33)
Average precipitation inches (mm)	3.85 (98)	3.21 (82)	3.98 (101)	4.35 (110)	4.64 (118)	4.43 (113)	4.79 (122)	4.02 (102)	4.21 (107)	3.55 (90)	3.63 (92)	4.02 (102)	48.68 (1,236)
Average snowfall inches (cm)	24.0 (61)	19.3 (49)	14.1 (36)	2.6 (6.6)	0.0 (0.0)	0.0 (0.0)	0.0 (0.0)	0.0 (0.0)	0.0 (0.0)	0.7 (1.8)	4.9 (12)	14.1 (36)	79.7 (202)
Average precipitation days (≥ 0.01 in)	20.1	16.4	15.0	15.1	15.0	13.9	13.3	12.0	11.4	12.7	13.8	18.2	176.9
Average snowy days (≥ 0.1 in)	10.9	9.5	6.1	1.6	0.0	0.0	0.0	0.0	0.0	0.4	2.7	7.1	38.3
Source: NOAA

== Demographics ==
Historical population
Census	Pop.	Note	%±
1810	75		—
1820	168		124.0%
1830	270		60.7%
1840	353		30.7%
1850	600		70.0%
1860	1,002		67.0%
1870	1,240		23.8%
1880	1,123		−9.4%
1890	1,202		7.0%
1900	1,574		30.9%
1910	1,978		25.7%
1920	2,179		10.2%
1930	3,063		40.6%
1940	3,719		21.4%
1950	4,086		9.9%
1960	4,111		0.6%
1970	4,318		5.0%
1980	4,096		−5.1%
1990	3,872		−5.5%
2000	3,091		−20.2%
2010	3,351		8.4%
2020	3,404		1.6%

=== 2020 census ===
As of the 2020 census, Ebensburg had a population of 3,404. The median age was 43.4 years. 19.3% of residents were under the age of 18 and 23.9% of residents were 65 years of age or older. For every 100 females there were 94.7 males, and for every 100 females age 18 and over there were 91.6 males age 18 and over.

97.9% of residents lived in urban areas, while 2.1% lived in rural areas.

There were 1,604 households in Ebensburg, of which 21.4% had children under the age of 18 living in them. Of all households, 39.7% were married-couple households, 21.1% were households with a male householder and no spouse or partner present, and 33.4% were households with a female householder and no spouse or partner present. About 42.5% of all households were made up of individuals and 19.6% had someone living alone who was 65 years of age or older.

There were 1,734 housing units, of which 7.5% were vacant. The homeowner vacancy rate was 1.3% and the rental vacancy rate was 5.6%.

Racial composition as of the 2020 census
Race	Number	Percent
White	3,188	93.7%
Black or African American	50	1.5%
American Indian and Alaska Native	3	0.1%
Asian	21	0.6%
Native Hawaiian and Other Pacific Islander	0	0.0%
Some other race	38	1.1%
Two or more races	104	3.1%
Hispanic or Latino (of any race)	49	1.4%

=== 2010 census ===
As of the 2010 census, there were 3,351 people and 1,612 households within the borough. The population density was 1,971.2 inhabitants per square mile (761.1/km^{2}). There were 1,742 housing units at an average density of 1,024.7 per square mile (395.6/km^{2}). The racial make-up of the borough was 98.27% White, 0.48% African American, 0.69% Asian, 0.12% Native American, 0.01% from other races, and 0.36% from two or more races. Hispanic or Latino of any race were 0.48% of the population.

There were 1,612 households, out of which 22.7% had children under the age of 18 living with them, 48.3% were married couples living together, 9.1% had a female householder with no husband present, and 39.3% were non-families. 35.3% of all households were made up of individuals, and 17.3% had someone living alone who was 65 years of age or older. The average household size was 2.23 and the average family size was 2.90.

In the borough the population was spread out, with 19.2% under the age of 18, 1.9% from 18 to 19, 6.4% from 20 to 24, 12.9% from 25 to 34, 17.4% from 35 to 49, 21.7% from 50 to 64, and 20.5% who were 65 years of age or older. The median age was 42 years. The population was 46.55% male, and 53.45% female.

== Law and government ==
=== Borough Officials ===
Position	Official	Party
Mayor	Randy Datsko	Democrat
Tax Collector	Charlene Remillard	Democrat
Borough Manager	Kelly Cook	

==== Council ====
Position	Official	Party
President	Doug Tusing	Republican
Vice President	Cecilia Houser	Republican
Councilor	Dave Kuhar	Democrat
Councilor	Mike Murphy	Democrat
Councilor	Theresa Jacoby	Republican
Councilor	Jeffrey Ball	Democrat
Councilor	Robert Miller	Republican

=== State Senate ===
District	Senator	Party
Pennsylvania's 35th Senatorial District	Wayne Langerholc	Republican

=== State House of Representatives ===
District	Representative	Party
72	Frank Burns	Democrat

== Notable buildings ==
- A.W. Buck House
- Cambria County Courthouse
- Cambria County Jail
- Ormsby Lodge
- Philip Noon House

== Notable people ==
- Abraham A. Barker, a congressman, abolitionist, and conductor on the Underground Railroad.
- Alan Baylock, jazz composer, band leader, chief arranger, US Air Force Airmen of Note
- Jack Darragh (1866–1939), baseball player
- Webster Davis (1861–1923), mayor of Kansas City, Missouri and Assistant Secretary of the Interior
- Ronald Duman (1954–2020), psychiatry professor and director of pharmacology
- Alvin Evans (1845–1906), congressman
- Bill Hartack (1932–2007), Hall of Fame jockey
- James Russell Leech (1888–1952), congressman
- Harriet B. Jones (1856–1943), physician and member of the West Virginia House of Delegates
- Roland Fremont Pryce (1906-1884), naval officer
- Samuel D. Pryce (1841–1923), Businessman, author, and Civil War officer
- William Pryce (1932–2006), U.S. Ambassador to Honduras
- Carol Scott (1949–2005), television producer and director
- Harve Tibbott (1885–1969), congressman
