= Veterans Park of Cambria County =

Memorial park in Pennsylvania

- Soldiers & Sailors Park of Cambria County
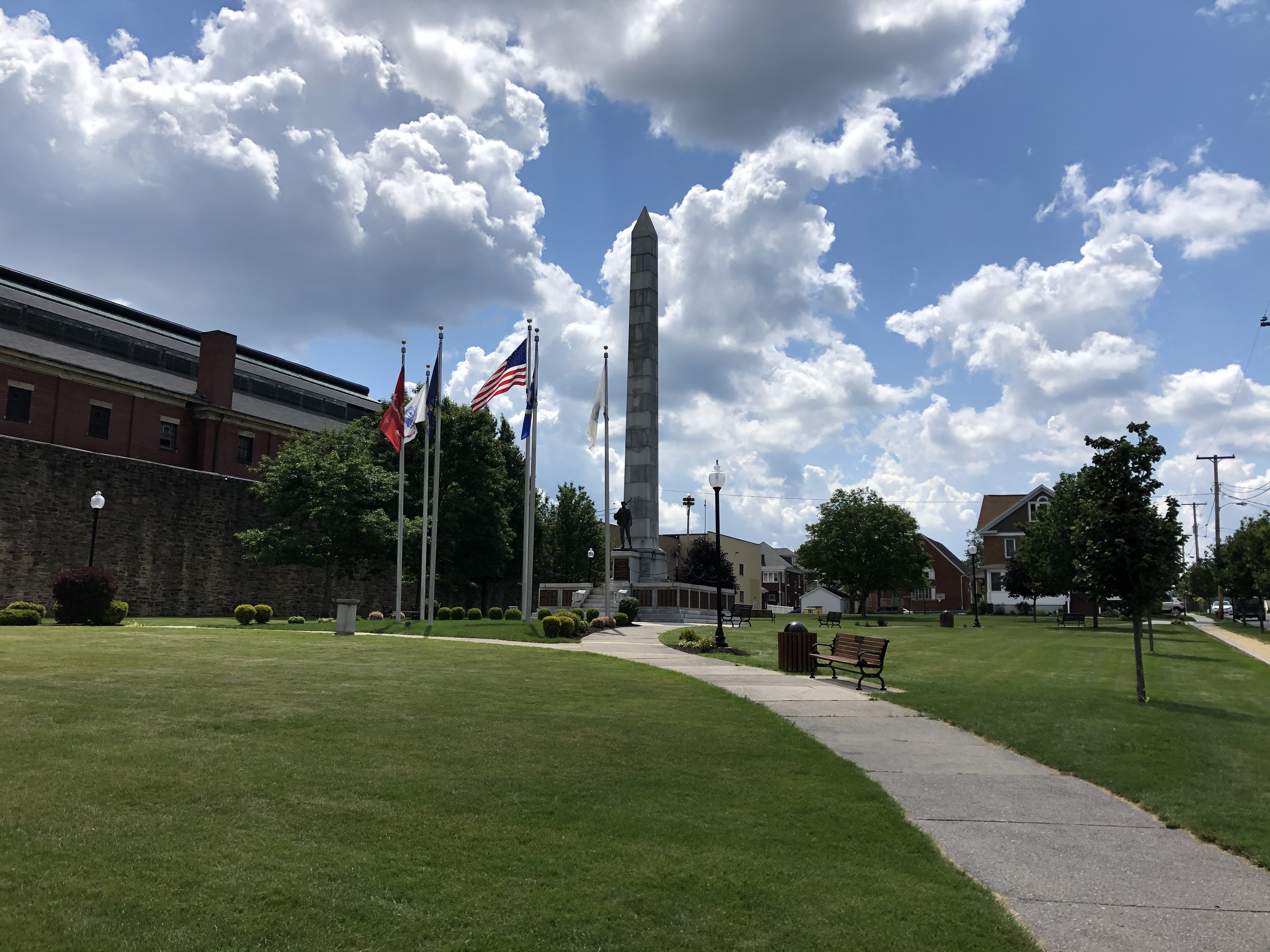
- From the northeast corner of the Veterans Park of Cambria County
- Interactive map of Veterans Park of Cambria County
- Type: Memorial park
- Location: Ebensburg, Cambria County, Pennsylvania, USA
- Coordinates: 40.4866°N 78.7255°W
- Established: 1913
- Designer: 14 Civil War Veterans

Veterans Park of Cambria County memorializes the approximately 5,500 soldiers from Cambria County, Pennsylvania who fought in the Revolutionary War, War of 1812, Mexican-American War, Civil War and Spanish-American War and is located in Ebensburg, Pennsylvania. The main feature of the park is a 63-foot (19.2 m) tall grey granite monument, which consists of an obelisk and towards the base facing east is a bronze Civil War "armed sentinel" manufactured by the Gorham Co. Foundry. Around the monument are 22 plaques listing the 5,500 names of the soldiers. However, this list of soldiers is not to be considered completely accurate. There were Cambria County soldiers that were not listed on this memorial due to one or more reasons. These reasons include: the entire family may have moved out of Cambria County before the memorial was built, or, the soldier may have joined a unit that was formed in another county. A plaque just below the Armed Sentinel reads: "[e]rected to the memory of the soldiers and sailors from Cambria County, Pennsylvania who fought in defense of their country."

The park is situated in the middle of town, facing Center street in a plot right next to the old Cambria County Jail.

== History ==
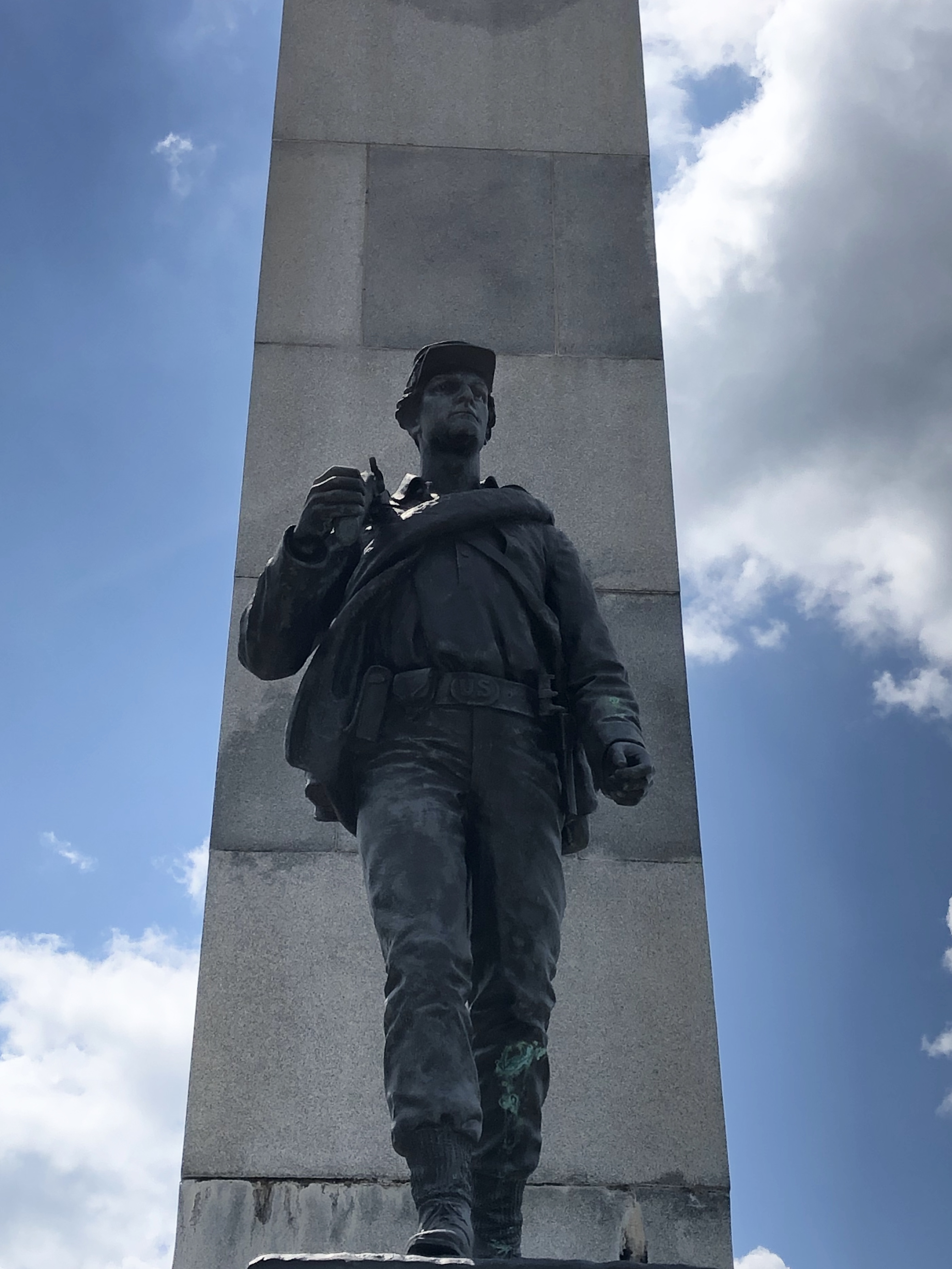
The "Armed Sentinel" in front of the obelisk

In 1872 David E. Park, a Pittsburgh businessman and financier, made his first philanthropic gesture to Ebensburg. This was in the form of a town park which initially went by the same name, "Town Park." This was Ebensburg's first formal planned space. Later, Park allocated funds for the park and its monument in the 1910s in response to the community's desire for a Civil War memorial. In 1912, a panel of fourteen distinguished Civil War veterans from across Cambria County met to make plans for the memorial's design. After meeting with the project's financial backer, David E. Park, the panel chose the obelisk design and placement of 3,500 names of Civil War veterans on bronze tablets at the monument's base.

County veterans organizations, including the Grand Army of the Republic, suggested an additional 2,000 names be included, representing veterans from all previous wars.

Let us have all the names from the American Revolution through the Civil War, or no names at all.

— Cambria Freeman, Aug. 9 (1912)

The memorial would then lists names of veterans of the American Revolution, War of 1812, Mexican War, Civil War and Spanish-American War. Another news article of the day stated: “We want the children of our schools, as they pass by the monument, to know that this county gave her best men, volunteers at that, to defend our country.” The county commissioners appropriated $7,000 in 1913 to erect the 63 foot tall grey granite monument. David E. Park moved the project forward with the donation of $5,000. Construction work was awarded to Jones Brothers of Barre, VT. The granite was donated by Jones Brothers, whose father, Seward Jones, l was a Civil War veteran born in Ebensburg.

The original name of the 1913 park is: Soldiers & Sailors Park of Cambria County. It has been the site of numerous veteran's parades, dedications and memorial observances. It is also the site of a community time capsule buried in 1975 during the time of the United States Bicentennial. On September 3, 1915, there was a large dedication for the park. The municipality declared a local holiday. The day began with a parade, and was followed by dedication speeches by veterans and patriotic songs.

On June 14, 2011 Flag Day and the 150th anniversary of the Civil War, the name of the park was officially changed to Veterans Park of Cambria County. The restored site features a semi-circle of six flags, with the United States flag flanked by flags representing the five branches of the military, honoring all who have served in any military capacity- wartime or peacetime, overseas or stateside.

== Gallery ==
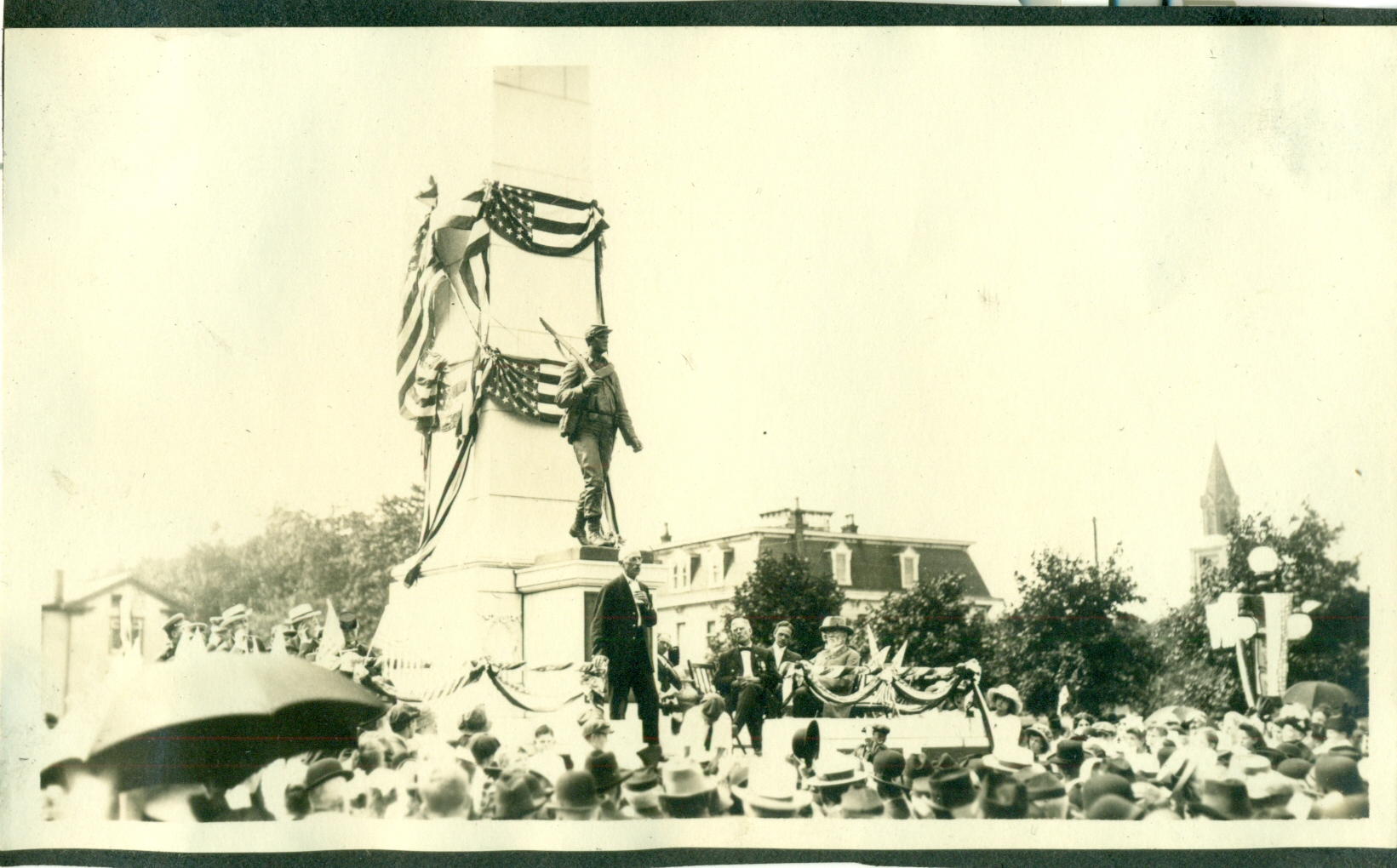

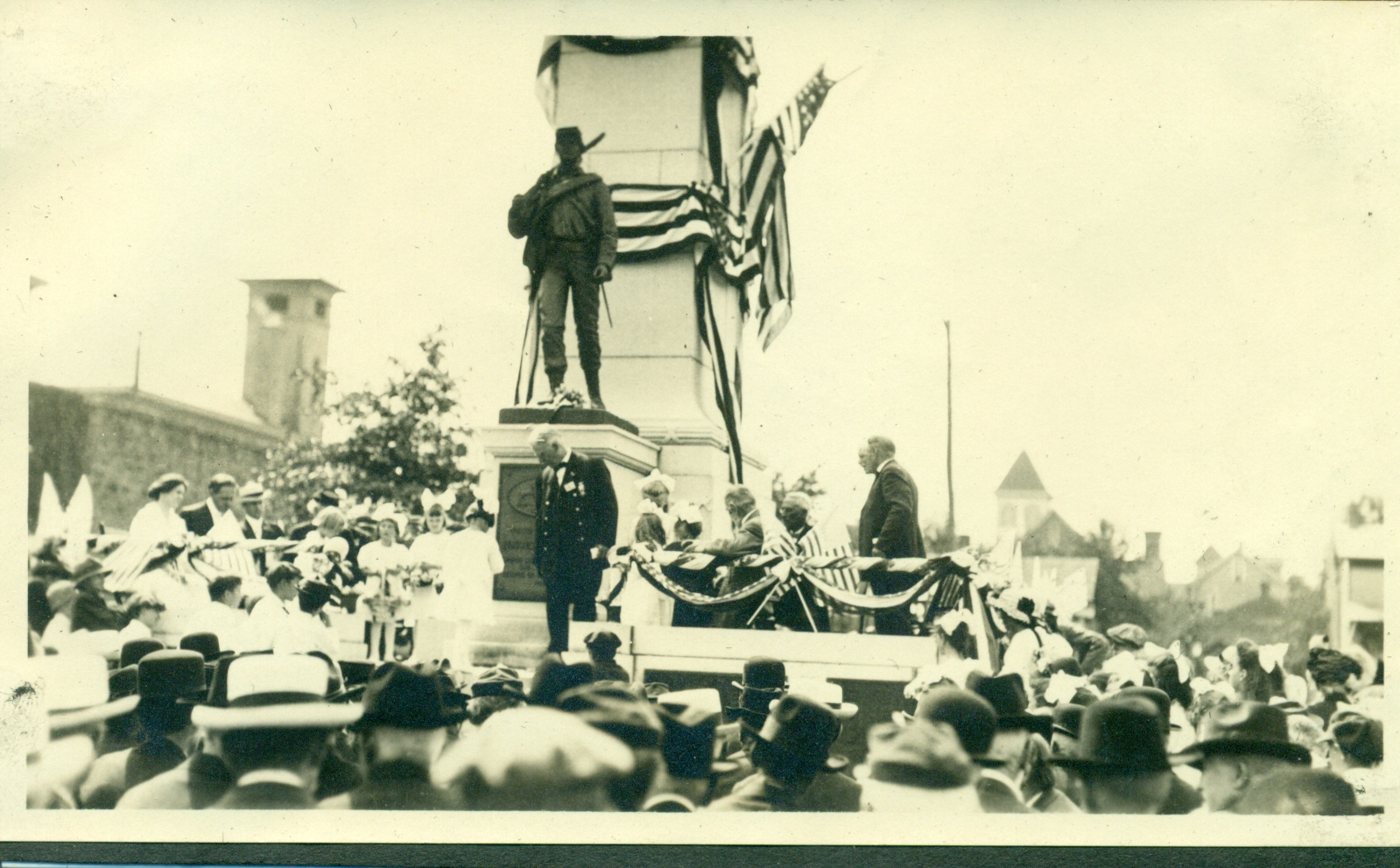

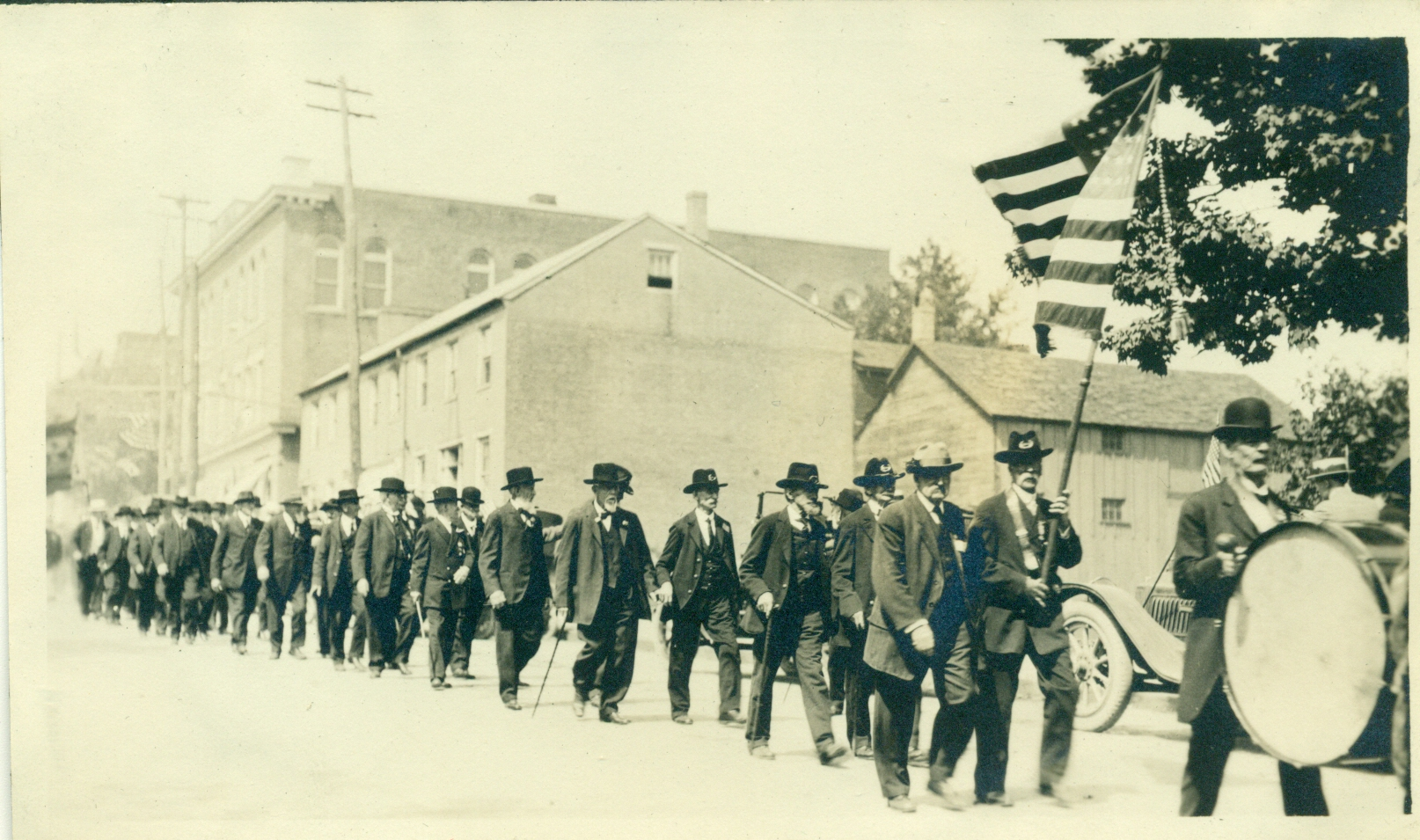

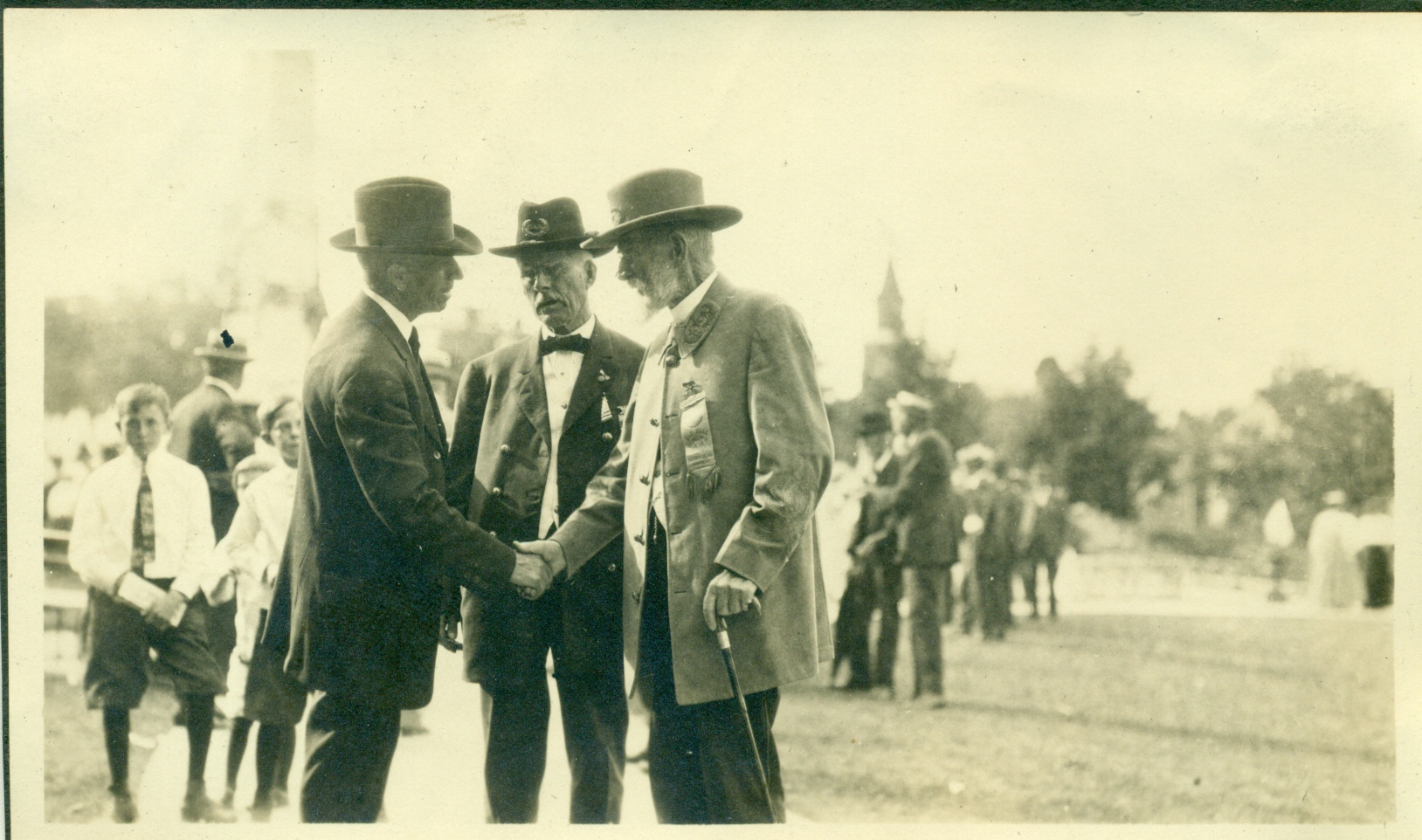

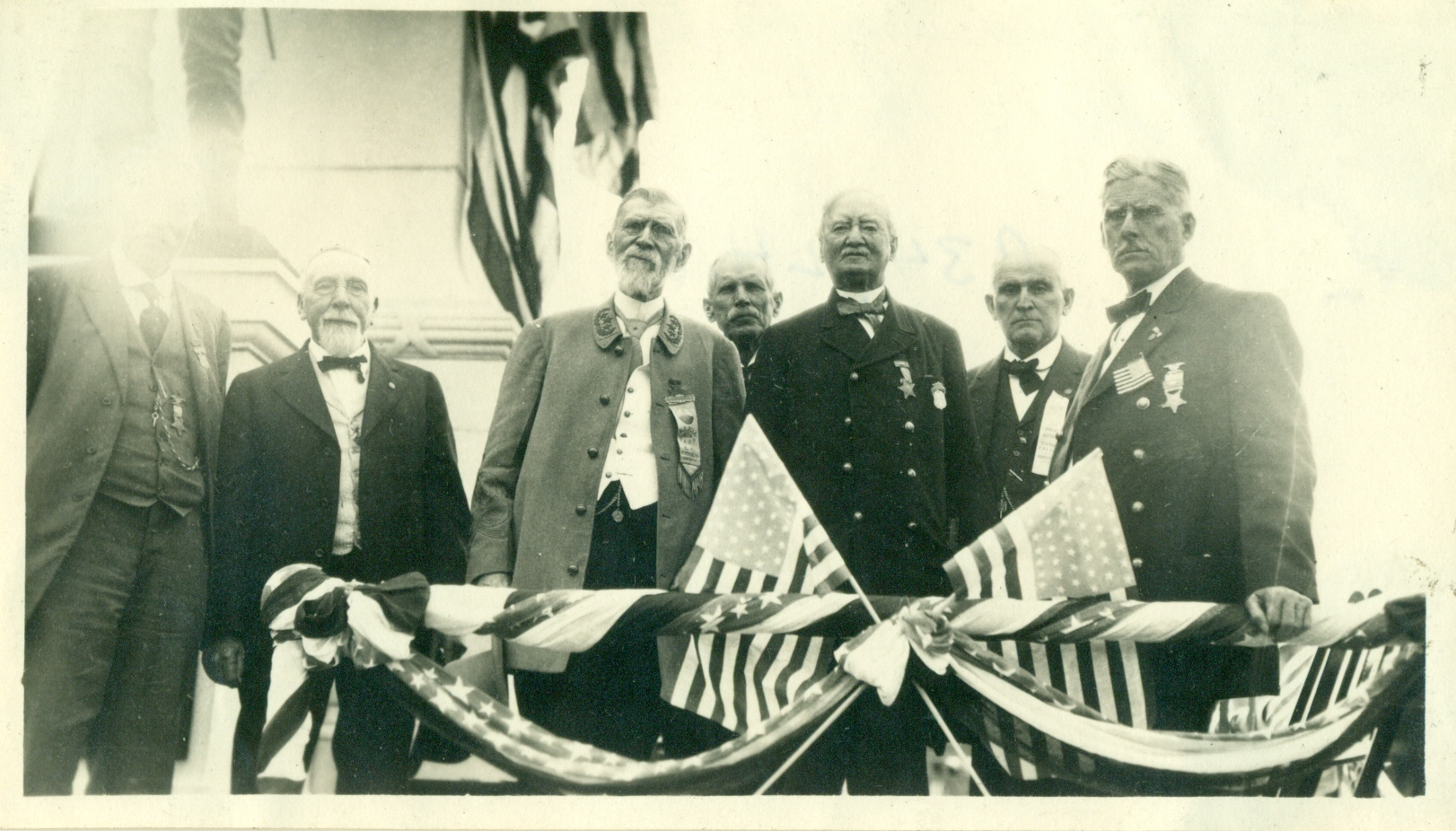

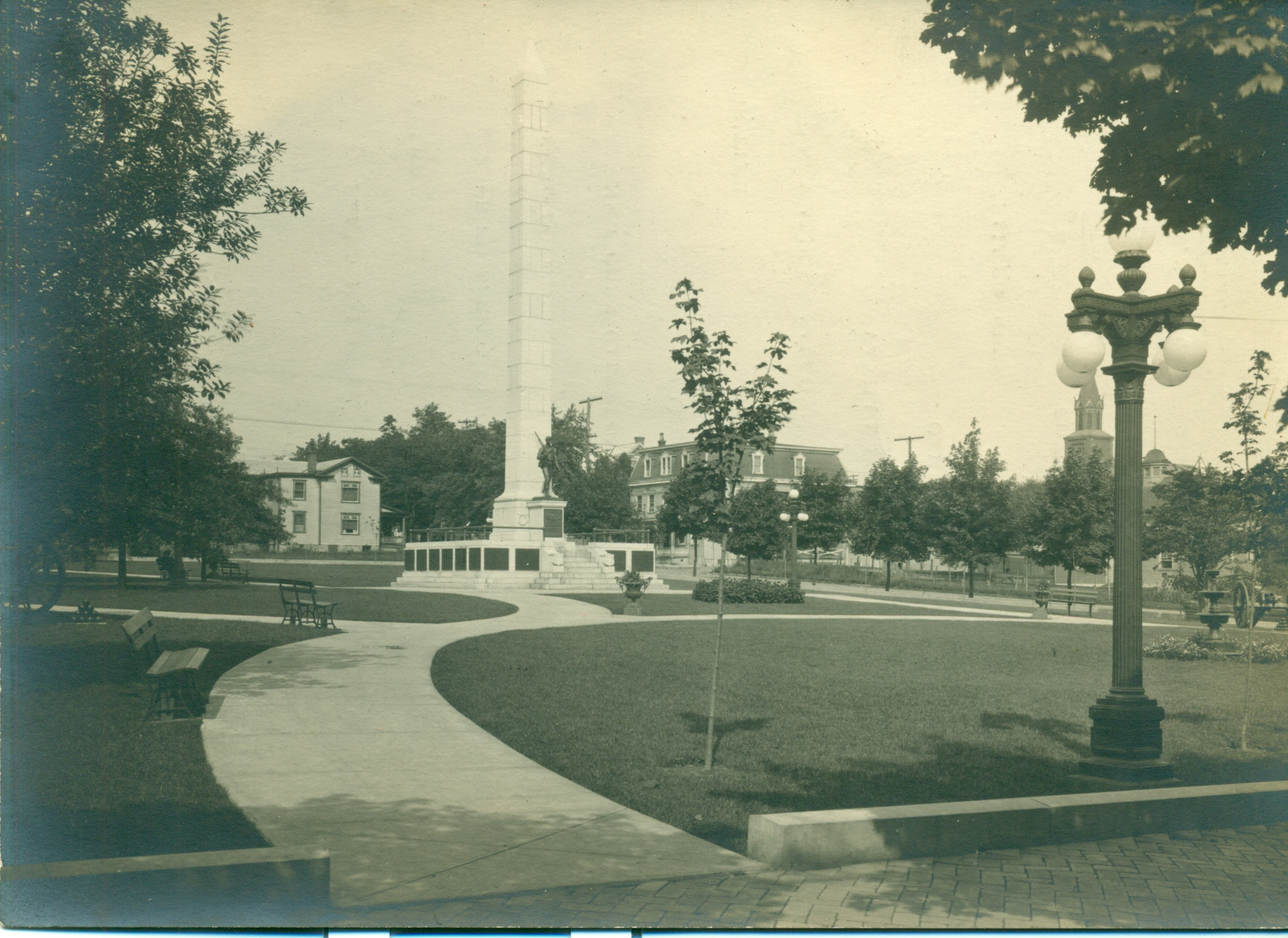
