= Philip Noon House =

Historic house in Pennsylvania, United States

- U.S. National Register of Historic Places
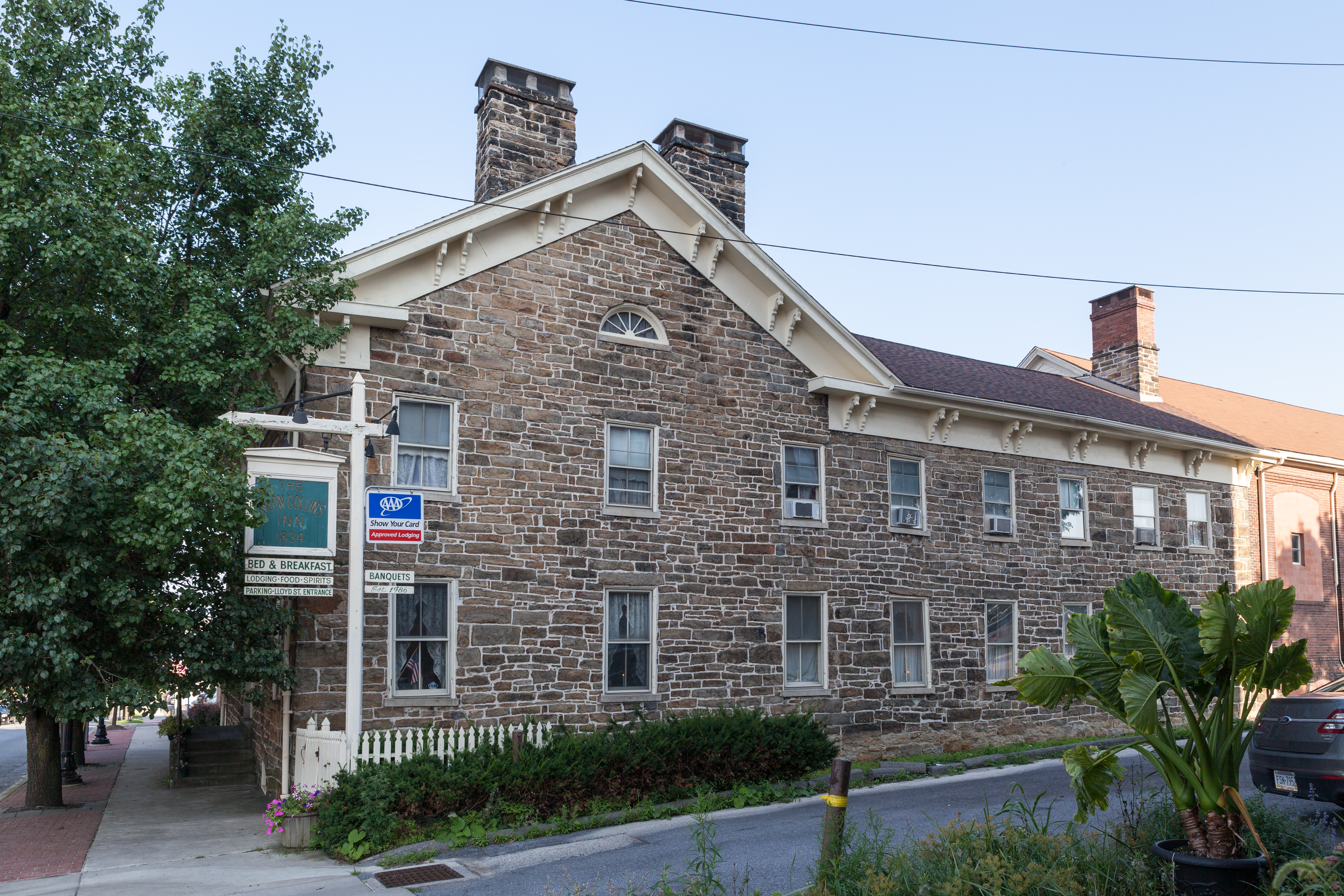

- Location within Pennsylvania Location within the United States
- Location: 114 E. High St., Ebensburg, Pennsylvania
- Coordinates: 40°29′5″N 78°43′29″W
- Area: 1 acre (0.40 ha)
- Built: 1834
- Built by: Noon, Philip, Esq.
- Architectural style: Federal
- NRHP reference No.: 84003179
- Added to NRHP: August 23, 1984

The Philip Noon House, also known as the YMCA Building of Ebensburg, the Phillip Collins House, and the Noon-Collins Inn, is an historic home that is located in Ebensburg, Cambria County, Pennsylvania, United States.

It was added to the National Register of Historic Places in 1984.

== History and architectural features ==
Built in 1834 with later additions, this historic structure is a stone house that was designed in the Federal style. It was converted for use by the Y.M.C.A. in 1906, at which time a gymnasium was added. The building also housed the Ebensburg Free Public Library from 1923 to 1949 and the Cambria County Historical Society from 1951 to 1964. The Y.M.C.A. ceased use of the building in 1977. It is now operated as a bed and breakfast known as the Noon-Collins Inn.
