= Leonidas M. Godley =

Union Army soldier

Leonidas Godley
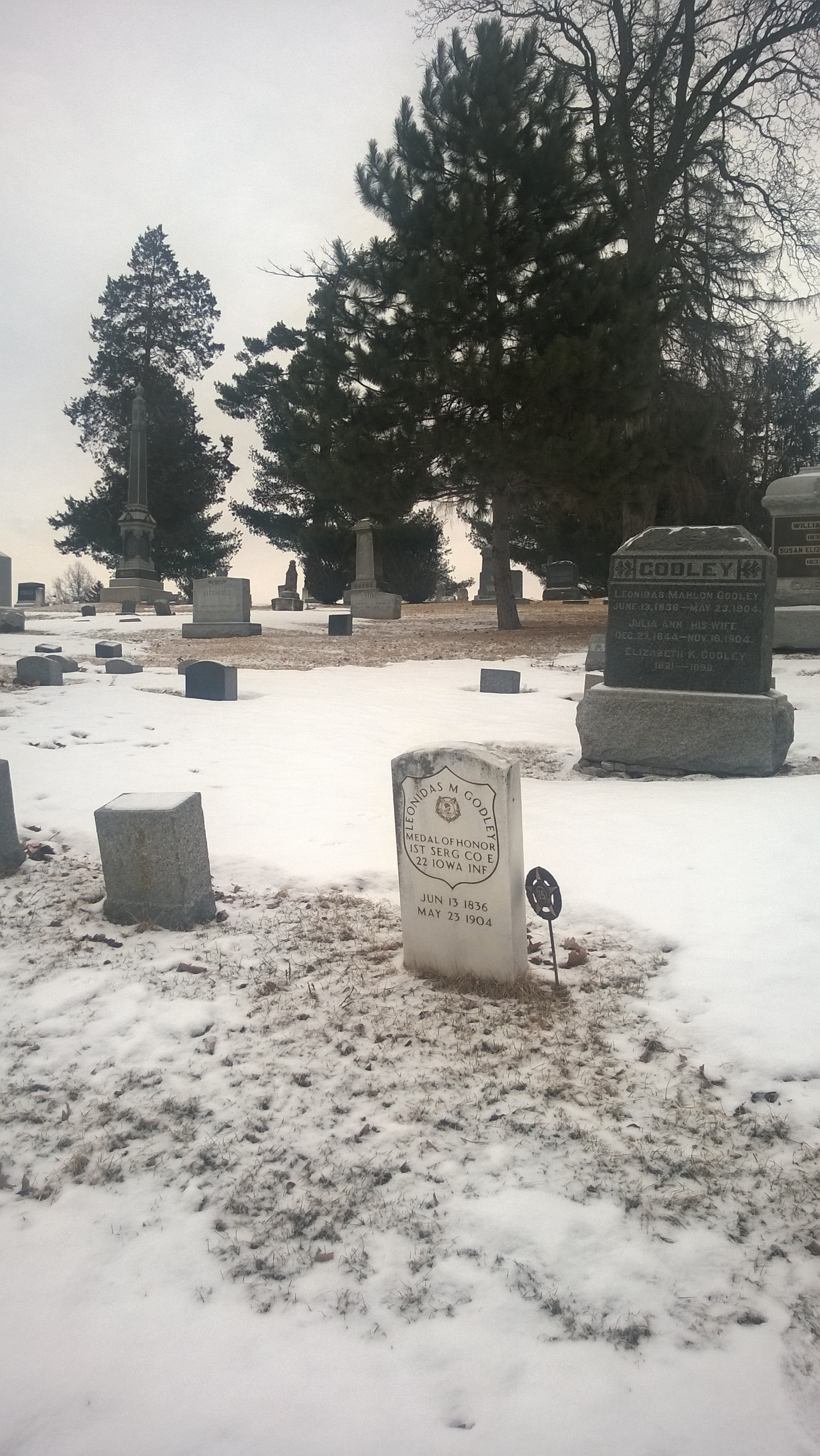
- Godley's headstone in Ottumwa, Iowa
- Born: June 13, 1836; Mason County, West Virginia, US
- Died: May 23, 1904 (aged 67); Ottumwa, Iowa, US
- Burial place: Ottumwa Cemetery, Ottumwa, Iowa
- Military career
- Allegiance: United States
- Branch: United States Army; Union Army
- Service years: 1862–1863
- Rank: First Sergeant
- Units: Company E, 22nd Iowa Volunteer Infantry Regiment
- Conflicts: American Civil War • Siege of Vicksburg
- Awards: Medal of Honor

Leonidas Mahlon Godley (June 13, 1836 – May 23, 1904) was a Union Army soldier during the American Civil War. He enlisted as 2nd Sergeant of Company E, 22nd Iowa Infantry Regiment on August 6, 1862, and was promoted 1st Sergeant in January 1863. He received the Medal of Honor for gallantry during the Siege of Vicksburg on May 22, 1863.

== Union assault ==
On the morning of May 22, 1863, General Ulysses S. Grant undertook a general assault of the three corps under his command - the XIII Corps, XV Corps and XVII Corps - on the Confederate defenses protecting Vicksburg, Mississippi. The 22nd Iowa, of the XIII Corps, was directed toward an earthen fortification near the tracks of the Southern Railroad - the "Railroad Redoubt". Godley helped lead men of the 22nd towards the Redoubt, and succeeded with others in getting to the parapet of the earthworks, before he was severely wounded and captured. Other soldiers of the 22nd later gained possession of a part of the outer works of the Redoubt, but were eventually forced out. By the end of the day's fighting, the 22nd Iowa suffered 82% of its men killed, wounded or captured - one of the highest single-action casualty rates suffered by any Civil War regiment.

Godley received the Medal of Honor on August 3, 1897.

== Medal of Honor citation ==
The President of the United States of America, in the name of Congress, takes pleasure in presenting the Medal of Honor to First Sergeant Leonidas Mahlon Godley, United States Army, for extraordinary heroism on 22 May 1863, while serving with Company E, 22d Iowa Infantry, in action at Vicksburg, Mississippi. First Sergeant Godley led his company in the assault on the enemy's works and gained the parapet, there receiving three very severe wounds. He lay all day in the sun, was taken prisoner, and had his leg amputated without anesthetics.

== See also ==
- List of American Civil War Medal of Honor recipients: G-L
