= 131st Pennsylvania Infantry Regiment =

Union Army infantry regiment

131st Pennsylvania Volunteer Infantry
- Active: August 1862 to May 23, 1863
- Country: United States
- Allegiance: Union
- Branch: Infantry
- Engagements: Battle of Antietam; Battle of Fredericksburg; Battle of Chancellorsville

The 131st Pennsylvania Volunteer Infantry was an infantry regiment that served in the Union Army during the American Civil War.

== Service ==
The 131st Pennsylvania Infantry was organized at Camp Curtin near Harrisburg, Pennsylvania, and mustered in August 1862 for nine month's service under the command of Colonel Peter H. Allabach.

The regiment was attached to 2nd Brigade, 3rd Division, V Corps, Army of the Potomac.

The 131st Pennsylvania Infantry mustered out May 23, 1863.

== Detailed service ==
Moved to Washington, D.C., August 20, and duty there until September 14. Moved to Sharpsburg, Md., and duty there until October 30. Movement to Falmouth, Va., October 30-November 19. Battle of Fredericksburg December 12–15. Burnside's 2nd Campaign, "Mud March," January 20–24, 1863. Duty at Falmouth until April. Chancellorsville Campaign April 27-May 6. Battle of Chancellorsville May 1–5

== Casualties ==
The regiment lost a total of 83 men during service; 2 officers and 36 enlisted men killed or mortally wounded, 1 officer and 44 enlisted men died of disease.

== Commanders ==
- Colonel Peter H. Allabach
- Lieutenant Colonel William B. Shaut - commanded the regiment almost entirely throughout its term of service due to Col. Allabach being promoted to brigade command
- Major Robert W. Patton - commanded at the Battle of Chancellorsville

== See also ==
- List of Pennsylvania Civil War Units
- Pennsylvania in the Civil War
