= Railroad Redoubt =

The Railroad Redoubt (a/k/a "Fort Beauregard" in post-War accounts) was one of several redoubts, or small defensive earthworks, that were constructed during the American Civil War to protect the city of Vicksburg, Mississippi, from Union attack. It was so named because it was constructed along a major east-west railroad track into Vicksburg.

On May 22, 1863, the Union XIII Corps, under the command of Major General John A. McClernand, attacked this portion of the Vicksburg defenses at 10:00 a.m. Within the hour, several units were fighting in or near the ditch fronting the position.

One regiment, the 22nd Iowa Volunteer Infantry Regiment, with close support from the 21st Iowa Volunteer Infantry Regiment, the 11th Wisconsin Volunteer Infantry Regiment and the 77th Illinois Volunteer Infantry Regiment, exploited a breach in the Redoubt created by artillery fire, and about a dozen members of the 22nd Iowa entered the defenses at that point. The survivors from that group occupied a forward portion of the position for some hours. The breach was not successfully reinforced, and the attackers not killed or wounded, along with members of supporting units, were forced back as darkness fell.

The following report is of 22nd Iowa Adjutant concerning the frontal assault of the Railroad Redoubt, on the morning of May 22, 1863:

The enemy were on the alert and, as our colors rose above the crest of the hill, a thousand bayonets glistened in the sunlight above the parapet at Fort Beauregard. The strong work against which the main attack was directed covered about half an acre of ground, the walls being about fifteen feet high, surrounded by a ditch ten feet wide. A line of rifle pits connected it with others of the same kind, each of which was so arranged as to enfilade the approach to the other. The regiment succeeded in reaching—under a concentrated fire of grape and musketry—an almost impenetrable abatis, forty yards from the works, where it became necessary to reform the line, the men having become separated in crossing the obstructions. They promptly rallied to the flag and were again led to the charge. A few officers and about fifty men, succeeded in reaching the ditch surrounding the fort, but, having no scaling ladders, they were unable to enter the works. Sergeant Joseph E. Griffith of the 22nd, with some fifteen or twenty men, succeeded—by raising one another up the wall—in gaining an entrance and capturing a number of prisoners, but the fire from the enemy's rifle pits in rear of the fort, and the lack of reinforcements coming to their aid, rendered the place untenable. Sergeant Griffith and David Trine, of Company I, were the only survivors of this daring exploit.

Only two men of the 22nd Iowa who entered the fort survived. This was the last frontal assault of Fort Beauregard ever attempted. Afterwards Vicksburg was defeated using long term siege tactics.

The 22nd Iowa's losses at Railroad Redoubt were heavy. Of the 200 engaged in the assault, 42 were killed or died of their wounds, 128 wounded and 19 captured. Theirs was the highest toll suffered in any regiment of Grant's army in the siege of Vicksburg.

Sergeant Leonidas M. Godley of Company E, although gravely wounded, survived the assault and was awarded the Medal of Honor in 1894 for his actions during the assault.

In the end, the Confederate position held, bringing on the Siege of Vicksburg.
