= Carol Scott =

American television producer and director

- Born: Carol Scott Englehart; May 26, 1949; Ebensburg, Pennsylvania, US
- Died: June 24, 2005 (aged 56); Studio City, California, US
- Education: Centenary University
- Spouse: Brian Caramadre
- Children: 1

Carol Scott Englehart Caramadre (26 May 1949 – 27 June 2005; professionally known as Carol Scott) was an American television producer and director who won four Daytime Emmy Awards for her work on soap opera General Hospital (1963) as a camera director, line producer, co-producer, editorial supervisor, and producer. Scott worked as an associate director on the television shows Day by Day (1988), Champs (1996), Night Court (1984) and The Stockard Channing Show (1979). She also worked on the sitcoms All in the Family and True Colors (1990).

== Biography ==
Scott was born Carol Scott Englehart in Ebensburg, Pennsylvania, in 1949. She was the sister to three other siblings, a brother and two sisters. Raised in Ebensburg, Carol graduated from Central Cambria High School in 1967 and was active in the former Cambria Cadets Jr. Drum & Bugle Corps. Scott attended Centenary College for Women in New Jersey and graduated in 1969. She began working in television in 1971 as a production assistant to Roone Arledge at ABC in New York, then moved into the control room of soap A World Apart. Scott worked her way up from associate director and other directorial positions to producer roles and is noted for achievements in the three-camera sitcom format. She made her mark with syndication productions such as Night Court, All in the Family and many other programs. Scott was also instrumental in the Starlight Vocal Band specials, the platform that launched then young comedian David Letterman.
