= Samuel D. Pryce =

American businessman, author, and soldier (b. 1841, d. 1923)

Samuel D. Pryce (1841–1923) was an American businessman, Civil War officer and author based in Iowa. Over many years, he composed a regimental history, which was finally published in 2008 under the title Vanishing Footprints: The Twenty-Second Iowa Volunteer Infantry in the Civil War. After the war, he helped start the Good Roads Movement in Iowa.

Pryce was born in Ebensburg, Pennsylvania in 1841. He came to Iowa City to teach and enroll in the University, but instead enlisted in 22nd Iowa Volunteer Infantry Regiment in the summer of 1862. He was promoted on the battlefield, and eventually served as Captain of Company A, adjutant of the regiment, and adjutant-general of Gen. Molineaux's brigade. He was mentioned for conspicuous gallantry at Winchester. He was one of Iowa's two delegates to the first Grand Army of the Republic (GAR) convention.

After the war, Pryce became a business and civic leader in Iowa City. From 1874 to 1879, he was one of the owners of the Iowa City Republican. He twice declined the Republican Party's nomination to be a Representative, but served in a number of local positions in Iowa City. On January 3, 1883 the Iowa State Register published Pryce's Public Highways in Iowa, which "became in large measure the basis of the good roads movement" in Iowa, and led to the calling of a State road convention in Iowa City in March 1883. Pryce's recommendations, including the elimination of labor tax and creation of a property tax, were adopted by the convention.
