= Charles Ernest Acker =

Electrical engineer and inventor (1868–1920)

- Born: March 19, 1868; Bourbon, Indiana, U.S.
- Died: October 18, 1920 (aged 52); Ossining, New York, U.S.
- Education: Cornell University
- Known for: Acker Process, Sodium hydroxide manufacturing, Carbon tetrachloride production
- Spouse: Alice Reynolds Beal (m. 1892)
- Children: Marjorie Acker Phillips
- Awards: Elliott Cresson Medal (1902)
- Scientific career
- Fields: Electrical engineering, Electrochemistry
- Workplaces: Acker Process Company

Charles Ernest Acker (1868–1920) was an American electrical engineer and inventor of the "Acker Process" for manufacturing sodium hydroxide by electrolysis of molten salt, for which he was awarded the Franklin Institute's Elliott Cresson Medal in 1902.

== Life ==
Acker was born in Bourbon, Indiana, on March 19, 1868, the son of William James Acker, a manufacturer. He studied at Cornell University, graduating in 1888, and worked as an electrical engineer in Chicago until 1893. In 1892 he married Alice Reynolds Beal. They had several children, one of whom was the painter Marjorie Acker Phillips.

Acker set up his own factory in Niagara Falls, New York, under the name Acker Process Company, and eventually held several dozen patents. He claimed to have been the first person in America to manufacture carbon tetrachloride.

He served as director of the American Electrochemical Society and president of the Niagara Falls Country Club.

Acker died in Ossining, New York, on October 18, 1920.
