= Ormsby Lodge =

Coordinates: 40°29′22″N 78°43′59.5″W

The Ormsby Lodge
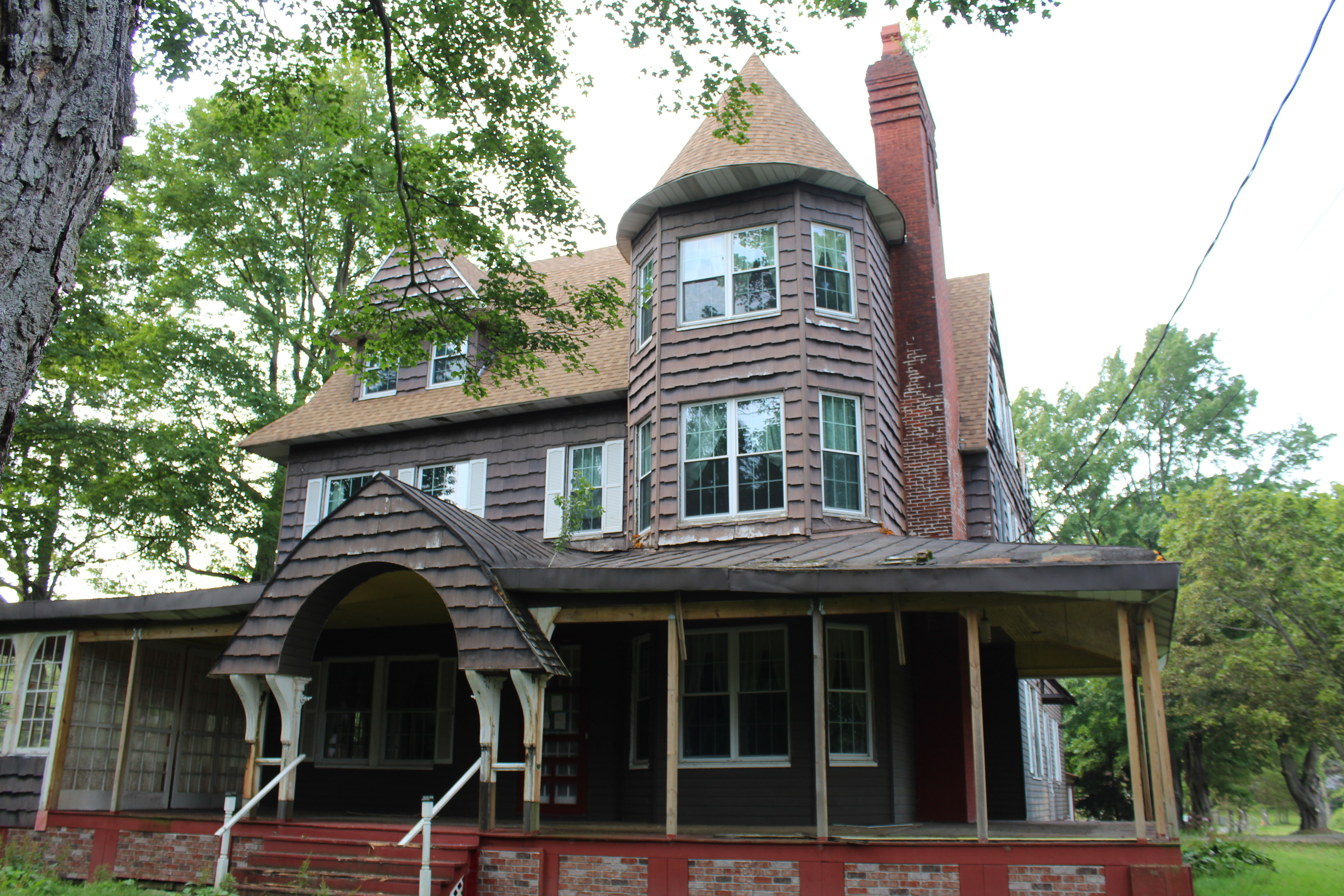
- Front of the Ormsby Lodge
- Alternative names: Ormsby Lodge and Carriage House

General information
- Town or city: Ebensburg, Pennsylvania
- Country: United States
- Completed: May 30, 1889

The Ormsby Lodge was the summer home to artist Marjorie Acker Philips and her husband, art collector and Yale graduate Duncan Phillips. The house is a Shingle Style structure, popular from 1880 to 1900 among the upper class who could afford it. While its design replicates a Queen Anne's, it is undoubtedly a shingle style home. It is located in Ebensburg, Pennsylvania, built in the 1880s during the towns boom as a summer resort location where a number of influential Pittsburgh socialites -as well as wealthy people of note from elsewhere- built cottages or stayed in lavish hotel resorts. It was built on a 30-acre (12 ha) piece of land on the Belmont Tract which existed in the north-west corner of Ebensburg. One historian described the house in a grand way, writing:

The house, for its time and location, was palatial, towering above the measly farmsteads of town with a spire of wood, fanciful windows with elegant woodwork designs, giant French doors lay at the threshold of each room whose ceiling stood far over the heads of residents, a wrap around porch that allowed the Phillips to enjoy the mountain air, and slightly sloping backyard where trees, maples and oaks mainly, sprouted and grew to almost vertigo inducing heights, rivaling and later outgrowing the size of the house.

Duncan Phillips often summered in Ebensburg with his family as a young boy who also had a house on the edges of town, so he knew the area well. When he married Marjorie, they spent a number of summers there together. She remembered that she and her husband “always took about thirty paintings to be hung in our house" to form a private seasonal gallery, hand picked from Duncan Phillips vast collection in Washington D.C. Marjorie Philips was inspired by the surrounding countryside and some of her art reflects that in scenes and landscapes.

The Phillips employed local men on their 30-acre estate. One John Ross who lived nearby was the manager of the grounds for 30 years, taking the job from two previous manager, Harry Pruner. He worked alongside Richard "Grandpap" Thomas, the grounds gardener. Ross retired in 1965 -just a year before Duncan Phillips' death- but recalled that the family would come in July and leave in September. They ate food prepared by servants and featured dishes heralding ingredients grown in the estates acre-sized garden.

== Ormsby Lodge After 1966 ==
Upon the death of Duncan Phillips, Mrs. Phillips quickly sold the property off to James McAlarney who was a retired chief engineer for the Ford Motor Company, and was a native of nearby Hastings, Pennsylvania. He and his wife lived in St. Petersburg, Florida and frequently visited the property, staying in a trailer, however. McAlarney considered turning the grounds and house into an apartment block and even starting a hospital on the site, but "problems arose over the water facilities and zoning" leading to the disintegration of those plans.

== Gallery ==
Art of Marjorie Acker Phillips inspired by the countryside in and around Ebensburg, Pennsylvania
