= 22nd Iowa Infantry Regiment =

- Iowa state flag
- Active: September 9, 1862, to July 25, 1865
- Country: United States
- Allegiance: Union
- Branch: Infantry
- Engagements: Battle of Port Gibson; Battle of Champion Hill; Battle of Big Black River Bridge; Siege of Vicksburg; Battle of Opequon Creek (Third Winchester); Battle of Fisher's Hill; Battle of Cedar Creek

The 22nd Iowa Infantry Regiment was an infantry regiment that served in the Union Army during the American Civil War.

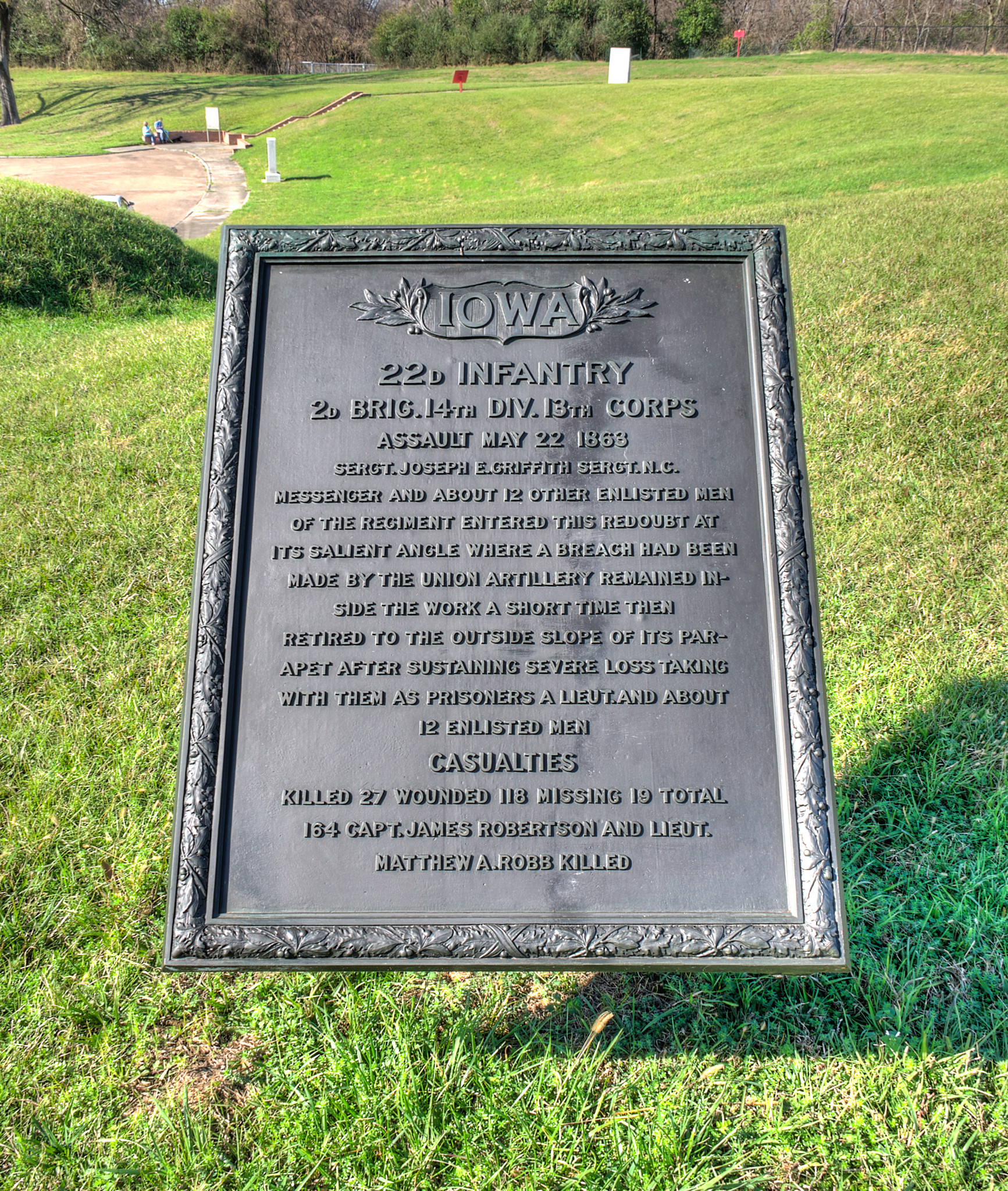
Unit position marker at Vicksburg National Military Park

== Service ==
The 22nd Iowa Infantry, also known as the "Johnson County Regiment", was organized at Iowa City, Iowa and mustered in for three years of Federal service on September 9, 1862. Companies A, B, F, G, H, I, and K were credited to Johnson County. Companies C, D and E were credited to Jasper, Monroe and Wapello counties, respectively.

After garrison duty in Missouri, the regiment served in Gen. Ulysses S. Grant's Vicksburg Campaign of 1863 as part of the XIII Corps. The regiment was one of the first ashore in Mississippi after the river crossing on April 30, 1863, and saw its first significant fighting during the night action near Port Gibson early on May 1. The 22nd was heavily involved in the rout of Confederate forces at Big Black River Bridge on May 17, and was the only Union unit to breach the defenses of Vicksburg, at the Railroad Redoubt, during the general assault of May 22. In late 1863 and early 1864, the regiment participated in operations on the Texas Gulf Coast and in Louisiana. In May 1864, it was ordered to Virginia and attached to the XIX Corps. The 22nd was one of only three regiments from Iowa to serve in Virginia, including during Gen. Philip Sheridan's Shenandoah Valley Campaign of August–November 1864. It suffered heavy losses at the Third Battle of Winchester and the Battle of Cedar Creek.

After several months of occupation duty in North Carolina and Georgia, the regiment was mustered out in Savannah, Georgia, on July 25, 1865.

Sergeant Leonidas M. Godley of Company E received the Medal of Honor in 1894, for his actions during the assault on the Railroad Redoubt on May 22, 1863.

Based on its casualties in service, the 22nd Iowa is listed as one of Lt. Col William F. Fox's "Fighting 300 Regiments" in his book, "Regimental Losses in the American Civil War".

== Total strength and casualties ==
A total of 1084 men served in the 22nd Iowa at one time or another during its existence. It suffered 6 officers and 108 enlisted men who were killed in action or who died of their wounds and 1 officer and 135 enlisted men who died of disease, for a total of 250 fatalities.

The 22nd Iowa’s losses at the Railroad Redoubt were heavy – 27 killed, 118 wounded and 19 missing. Theirs was the highest single-action casualty toll suffered by any regiment of Grant’s army in the operations against Vicksburg.

== Commanders ==
- Colonel William Milo Stone, later Governor of Iowa (1864–68).
- Colonel Harvey Graham

== Other notable personnel ==
Lt. Col. Ephraim White, grandfather of football star and Supreme Court Justice Byron "Whizzer" White.

Sgt. Isaac Struble, attorney, and Congressman (1883–1891).

Capt. Samuel D. Pryce, delegate to first GAR convention; author of regimental history, Vanishing Footprints: The Twenty-Second Iowa Volunteer Infantry in the Civil War.

Pvt. Upton Christian Holderman, Jr., father of Medal of Honor recipient Nelson Miles Holderman, of Lost Battalion fame.

== See also ==
- List of Iowa Civil War Units
- Iowa in the American Civil War
