= Ronald Duman =

American medical academic (1954–2020)

- Born: Ronald Stanton Duman; February 6, 1954; Ebensburg, Pennsylvania, U.S.
- Died: February 1, 2020 (aged 65); Guilford, Connecticut, U.S.
- Education: College of William & Mary; University of Texas Health Science Center at Houston
- Occupation: Neuroscientist

Ronald Stanton Duman (February 6, 1954 – February 1, 2020) was an American Professor of Psychiatry and Pharmacology Director, Division of Molecular Psychiatry and Abraham Ribicoff Research Facilities at Yale University.

== Education ==
Duman graduated from the College of William & Mary (where he played varsity football as a middle linebacker) in 1976. He received his Ph.D. from the University of Texas Health Science Center at Houston (UTHealth) in 1985.

== Career ==
Ron Duman's research centered around the biological mechanisms behind antidepressants. In his landmark 1995 paper, he discovered that antidepressants increase the gene expression of Brain-Derived Neurotrophic Factor, or (BDNF) in the hippocampus. In a later paper he discovered that the downstream effect of BDNF is to increase neurogenesis or the formation of new neurons in the dentate gyrus of the hippocampus.

The results of this work led him to formulate the hypothesis that depression is caused by a decrease in hippocampal neurogenesis caused by elevated cortisol levels.

== Death ==
Ronald Duman died on February 1, 2020, at the age of 65 while hiking in Guilford, Connecticut.
