= Cambria County Jail =

- U.S. National Register of Historic Places
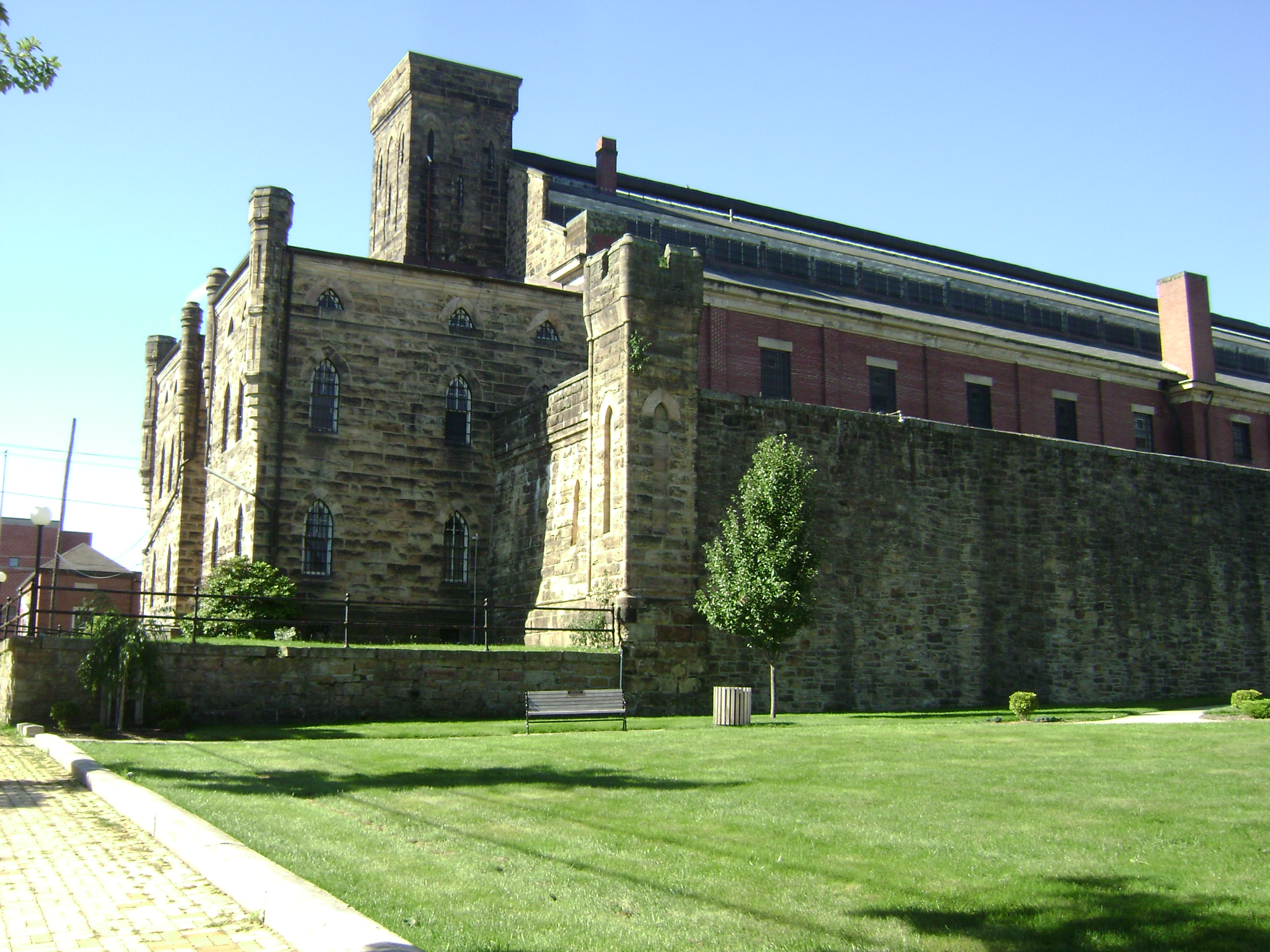
- Cambria County Jail, September 2014

- Location within Pennsylvania Location within the United States
- Location: N. Center and Sample Sts., Ebensburg, Pennsylvania
- Coordinates: 40°29′11″N 78°43′34″W
- Area: 1.6 acres (0.65 ha)
- Built: 1872
- Built by: William Callan
- Architect: Edward Haviland
- Architectural style: Gothic Revival
- NRHP reference No.: 80003450
- Added to NRHP: June 30, 1980

Cambria County Jail is a historic jail located in downtown Ebensburg, Cambria County, Pennsylvania.

It was added to the National Register of Historic Places in 1980.

== History ==
In April 1870, the Cambria County commissioners purchased a parcel of land from E. J. McDonald for $2,500 for the construction of a new county prison.

Critics in Johnstown referred to it as a "Welsh castle" in ridicule, which was also a knock on Ebensburg's Welsh roots.

The prison was overcrowded for many years. A total of 123 men were confined in only 27 cells. They then went on to build an additional 52 cells in 1911.

In the spring of 1997 the "Old Stone Jail" was abandoned for a new facility and temporarily was turned into a records center in a $400,000 project.

=== Escape of Michael "Mickey" Smith ===
Convicted in 1884 of killing a man from Johnstown. But after leaving a farewell letter to the warden, he managed to escape without a trace. The officers found that it was impossible to escape, because the walls were made of concrete and iron and they were about 22 feet high. The warden saw no trace of Michael Smith.

Michael "Mickey" Smith would have been the fourth execution at the jail. He was never found. Reenactments of how Mickey may have escaped have been performed and his cell is the site of an exhibition hosted by the Old Stone Jail which includes a recreated noose by his height and weight.

=== Hauntings ===
There are many other reported hauntings that the Cambria County Jail holds. The prison built gallows where they would execute men. 11 men were hung and or executed within the walls of the Cambria County Jail. Citizens could buy a ticket to watch people get hung on certain days for entertainment because they had no electricity that was available to them. Now when people tour the jail it is known for them to hear screams and feel cold breezes coming from the gallows. Paranormal Tours and Investigations are available through the Old Stone Jail's website.

== Jail Renovations ==
The Cambria County Jail is going to be completely changed into a Multi-Purpose building by developer, DSherwoodD Enterprises, LLC. This news came to light in June 2020. The Jail is now going to include offices, retail space, event space, and a breakfast/brunch Wi-Fi hotspot. The renovations will take many years, and it is set to be fully completed by late 2027.

=== Jail Tours ===
Tours of the jail are currently being offered through the Old Stone Jail's website.

== Architecture ==
It was built in 1872, and is a Gothic Revival style sandstone building measuring 56 feet wide, 100 feet deep, and 60 feet tall. An addition, (a new cell block) was built in 1910. The front façade features pointed drop arch windows and a pointed arch portal. The jail is surrounded by a 22 feet tall substantial stone wall. The building also has a tower. The tower is located at the front entrance. The floors are wooden but have iron that lays below. The building also contains a lower and upper floor with cells on each floor.

== In the Media ==
=== Television ===
The Cambria County Jail was featured as a haunted location on the season 3 episode of Paranormal Lockdown, titled "Old Cambria Jail", which aired on Destination America in 2018. Paranormal investigators Nick Groff and Katrina Weidman spent 72-hours locked down in the jail to investigate the legend Michael "Mickey" Smith, an inmate who mysteriously disappeared from a locked cell shortly before his execution in 1884.

The Travel Channel's television show Destination Fear filmed at the location for the fifth episode of their second season in 2020.

=== Books ===
A book titled The Black Gate by David Regala Jr. covers a lot of information that was discussed in the episode of The Cambria County Jail. The book covers many hauntings, and even paranormal activity.
