= Peter H. Allabach =

Union Army officer (1824–1892)

Peter Hollingshead Allabach
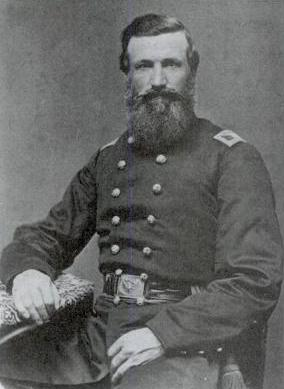
- Col. Peter H. Allabach
- Born: September 9, 1824; Wilkes-Barre, Pennsylvania
- Died: February 11, 1892 (aged 67); Washington, D.C.
- Burial place: Arlington National Cemetery
- Military career
- Allegiance: United States of America; Union
- Branch: United States Army; Union Army
- Service years: 1844–1849; 1862–1863
- Rank: Colonel
- Commands: 131st Pennsylvania Infantry; 2nd Brigade, 3rd Division, V Corps, Army of the Potomac
- Conflicts: Mexican–American War: Battle of Monterey; Battle of Vera Cruz; Battle of Cerro Gordo; Battle of Contreras; Battle of Churubusco; Battle of Molino del Rey; Battle of Chapultepec; American Civil War: Battle of Antietam; Battle of Fredericksburg; Battle of Chancellorsville

Peter Hollingshead Allabach (September 9, 1824 – February 11, 1892) was an officer in the Union Army during the American Civil War.

== Early life and career ==
Allabach was born in Wilkes-Barre, Pennsylvania and attended the academy there. At the age of 20, he enlisted in Company E, 3rd U.S. Infantry for five years. During his service in the Mexican–American War, he participated in every battle his regiment was in, including the Battle of Vera Cruz, the Battle of Chapultepec, and at the Battle of Contreras, he is noted as planting the first flag in the enemy camp. The only conflict he did not participate in was the battle of Buena Vista. He was promoted to sergeant within six months of enlisting and was discharged on November 25, 1849, when his term of service expired.

On September 30, 1851, he married Nancy Gertrude Blanchard, with whom he had two children.

Allabach also served as the Brigade Inspector of the Uniformed Militia of Luzerne County, which he was commissioned as by Governor William Bigler on May 6, 1852. In 1853, United States Postmaster General James Campbell appointed Allabach to a position in the United States postal service, which he held for about eight years.

== Civil War ==
On August 16, 1862, Allabach was commissioned as colonel of the 131st Pennsylvania Infantry, a nine months' regiment, by Governor Andrew Gregg Curtin. When his regiment reported to General Andrew A. Humphreys, the brigade organization underwent some changes. Allabach, the senior colonel, replaced Brig. Gen. Henry Shaw Briggs, who had been severely wounded at the Battle of Fair Oaks, and was unable to return to an active command. This brigade was composed of the 123rd Pennsylvania Infantry, 131st Pennsylvania Infantry, 133rd Pennsylvania Infantry, and 155th Pennsylvania Infantry, being assigned to the 3rd Division, V Corps of the Army of the Potomac.

The 3rd Division arrived in Sharpsburg, Maryland on the morning of September 18, 1862, relieving troops from the previous days' engagement. After the Confederate Army had withdrawn, the brigade was assigned to picket duty along the Potomac River. At their camp, about a mile outside of Sharpsburg, they spent time drilling until late October. At that time, General Ambrose Burnside ordered the army into Virginia for the Fredericksburg Campaign, where Allabach made camp for about a month in Falmouth, during which time the brigade continued drilling.

=== Fredericksburg ===
On December 11, Allabach moved the brigade to Fredericksburg, where it was held near General Burnside's headquarters at the Phillips' House until the 13th. At 2 o'clock in the afternoon, the brigade was ordered to cross the Rappahannock River, march through the town, and prepare to assault Marye's Heights. The brigade was formed with the 155th and 133rd in the front, respectively, and the 123rd and 131st behind, as such, numbering about 2,300 men.

My troops, not having before been under fire, seemed to think that they were not to go beyond.

— Peter H. Allabach, later commenting on his brigade during the assault on Marye's Heights

With Humphreys personally leading the assault, the brigade stepped out of the ravine where it had been deployed, and advanced about 200 yards before it reached the lines of the II Corps, lying on the ground about 150 yards from the stone wall on the heights. Despite attempts to prevent the brigade from stopping, it also fell to the ground among the II Corps men and began firing. Allabach blamed this on his troops' greenness, as this was their first real combat.

After Humphreys and Allabach were able to quiet the fire among the lines, Allabach ordered a major from the II Corps to get up and charge with them or to go to the rear, which was ignored. With bayonets fixed, Allabach had his brigade rise up and advance at the double-quick to the stone wall. The charge was met with intense canister and musket fire, as well as confusion, due to the smoke and terrain. The 131st Pennsylvania even became split in two during the assault.

The brigade reached about 12 paces from the wall, before it began to withdraw from the heavy fire. The retreat had some running back to the town and others joining the troops of the II Corps. The 131st took a forward position to the II Corps line, went prone, and again fired ineffectively at the enemy. Other commands soon began to fall into the same line.

This forward position soon became unbearable, as enemy fire from the front continued, new fire erupted from the rear. Those men who had disrupted the advance earlier were now overcome with an "excess of enthusiasm," and were firing into Allabach's lines, attempting to dislodge the enemy behind the wall. Allabach tried to push his lines forward, in a second attempt to charge, but his horse was soon shot from under him, and he was left looking for another mount.

Casualties	123rd	131st	133rd	155th	Total
Killed	21	21	20	6	68
Wounded	131	132	137	58	458
Missing	0	24	27	4	55
Total	152	177	184	68	581

The second charge ended much like the first one, being driven back to their forward position and suffering numerous casualties. Humphreys brought up Brig. Gen. Erastus B. Tyler's 1st Brigade, which met a similar fate. After Tyler had retired, Humphreys returned to Allabach, who was still in his forward position. Humphreys used the 123rd and 155th Pennsylvania to cover the 131st and 133rd as Allabach withdrew them to Hanover Street. When the rest of the brigade was re-formed, there was little light left and they spent the night on picket duty, with details being sent out to gather the dead and wounded.

The brigade remained in Fredericksburg until the 16th, when it re-crossed the Rappahannock and settled in winter quarters. Allabach, whose brigade suffered about 24% casualties, claimed that his "old boys got nearer the gates of hell than any other regiments engaged in that battle."

=== Chancellorsville ===
On January 31, 1863, the brigade moved to a camp nearer to Falmouth, designated as Camp Humphreys. It remained here on picket duty until April 28, when the army, now under Maj. Gen. Joseph Hooker, was ordered to re-cross the Rappahannock, this time for the Chancellorsville campaign. Arriving on May 1, the brigade was positioned near the Chancellor House. Within minutes, the V Corps was attacked, and Allabach's brigade was ordered to the extreme left to begin fortifying.

On the 3rd, the brigade was moved to the right of the Union lines with the rest of the V Corps, under General George G. Meade. At this position, they were placed in support of artillery batteries and saw relatively little combat compared to their previous engagement. On the night of the 5th, the brigade retired to the United States Ford and assisted in the crossing of artillery trains.

Returning to Harrisburg after the battle, the 123rd, 131st, and 133rd were mustered out of service. The 155th, which had enlisted for three years, was assigned to the 3rd Brigade, 2nd Division, V Corps, and was heavily engaged at the Battle of Gettysburg less than two months later.

== Postbellum ==
Allabach did not return to the service of the army following his muster out. In April 1876, Governor John F. Hartranft appointed Allabach captain of Company E of the Centennial Guards, which he held during the Centennial Exposition. On June 1, 1879, he was appointed as Chief of the United States Capitol Police. This position was held until February 11, 1892, when, after having been ill for three weeks, he died at his home. Allabach was buried at Arlington National Cemetery.
