= A. W. Buck House =

Historic house in Pennsylvania, United States

- U.S. National Register of Historic Places
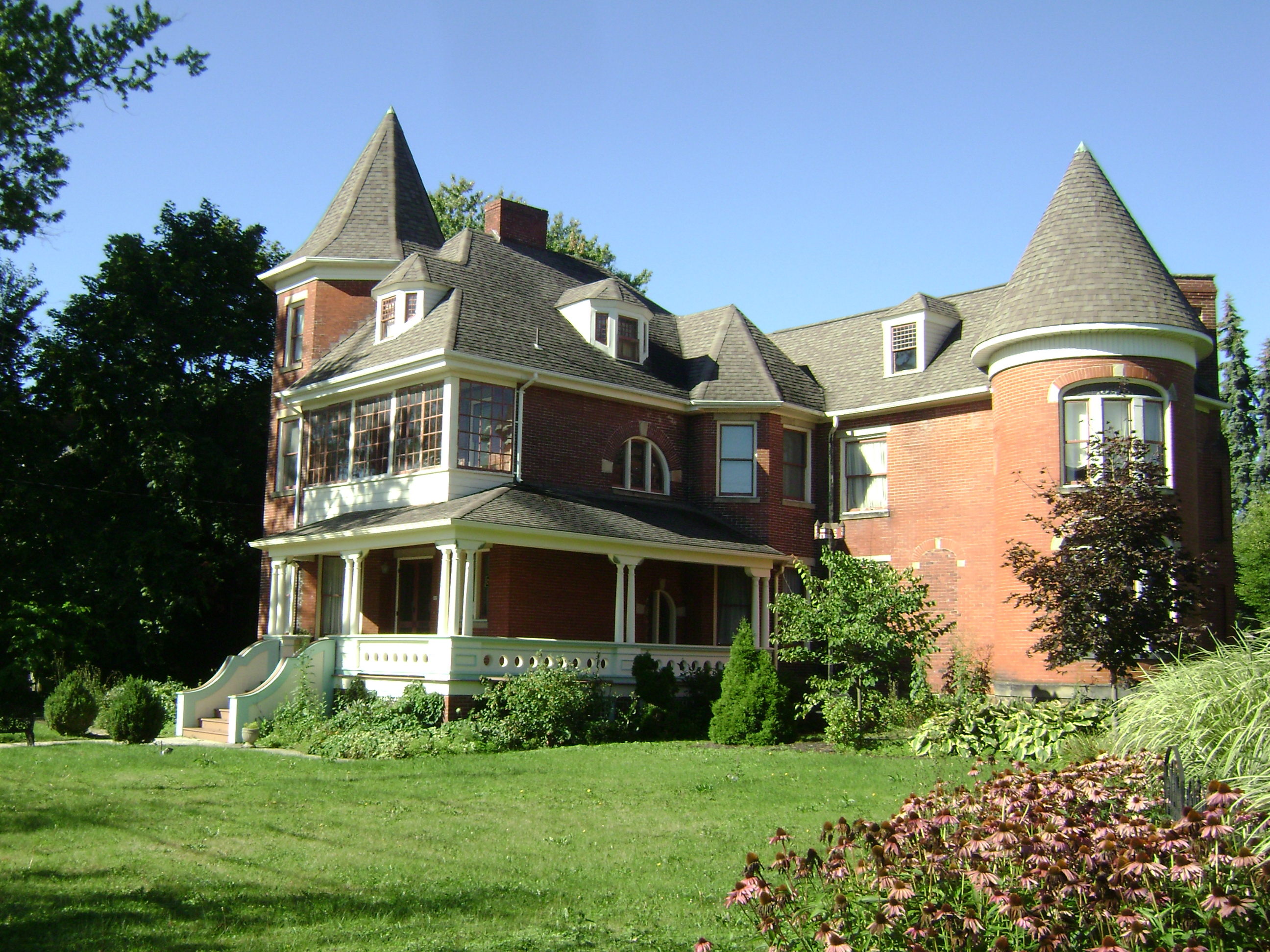
- The A. W. Buck House, September 2014

- Location within Pennsylvania Location within the United States
- Location: 615 N. Center St., Ebensburg, Pennsylvania
- Coordinates: 40°29′22″N 78°43′31″W
- Area: less than one acre
- Built: 1889
- Architectural style: Queen Anne
- NRHP reference No.: 95000521
- Added to NRHP: May 12, 1995

A. W. Buck House is a historic home located at Ebensburg, Cambria County, Pennsylvania, United States. It was built in 1889, and is a high style Queen Anne style dwelling. A two-story wing with end tower was built in 1903. It is a 2 1/2-story, three-bay brick building. It features an eight sided, three-story tower and a wrap-around porch. It was originally built as a private residence. In 1923, it was purchased by the Roman Catholic Diocese of Altoona-Johnstown as a convent for the Sisters of St. Joseph.

In 1990, it was sold to the Cambria County Historical Society and is operated as a local history museum.

It was added to the National Register of Historic Places in 1995.
