= Gifford Beal =

American painter, printmaker, and muralist (1879–1956)

Gifford Reynolds Beal
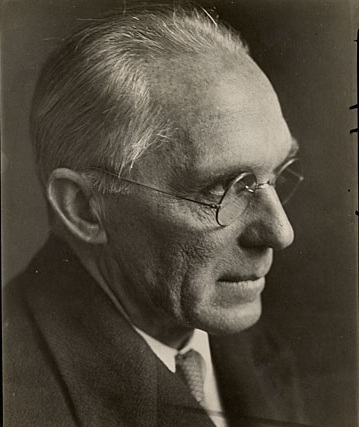
- Portrait of Gifford Reynolds Beal
- Born: January 24, 1879; New York City
- Died: February 5, 1956 (aged 77); New York City
- Known for: Painting
- Movement: Impressionist; Modernist
- Relatives: Reynolds Beal (brother)

Gifford Beal (January 24, 1879 – February 5, 1956) was an American painter, watercolorist, printmaker and muralist.

== Early life ==
Born in New York City, Gifford Beal was the youngest son in a family of six surviving children. His oldest brother Reynolds Beal (1866–1951) also went on to become an accomplished painter as did his niece Marjorie Acker (1894–1985), who married Duncan Phillips, the founder of The Phillips Collection of Washington D.C.

Beal knew from an early age that he wanted to paint. Between 1892 and 1901 he studied with William Merritt Chase (1849–1916) on weekends in New York City and during the summer at Chase’s Shinnecock Hills Summer School of Art on Long Island.

After graduating from Princeton University in 1900 he studied at the Art Students League of New York from 1901 to 1903 with George Brandt Bridgman (1864–1943) and Frank Vincent DuMond (1865–1951).

== Career rise and recognition ==
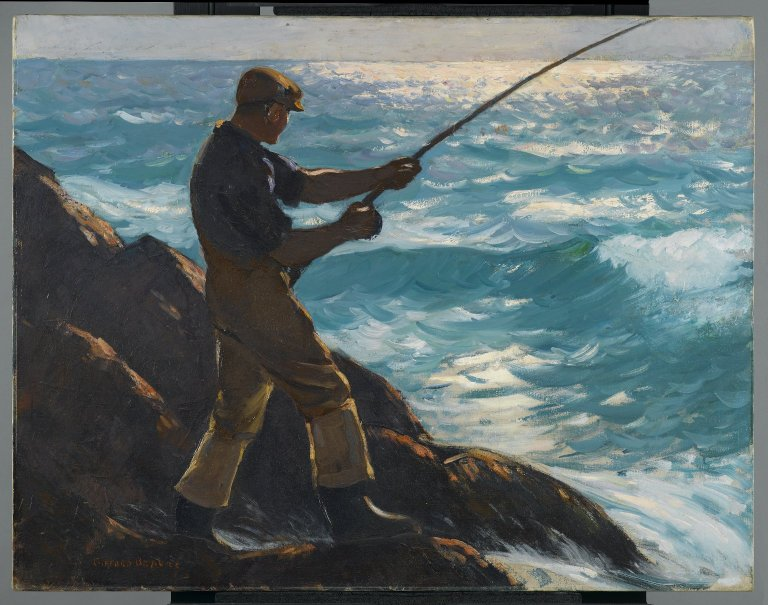
Gifford Beal, The Fisherman, 1922, Brooklyn Museum

In 1903 Beal won his first award (3rd prize) in a competitive exhibition, held at Worcester Art Museum, Massachusetts. Many prizes followed including those awarded by:

- National Academy of Design, New York, (Hallgarten Prize in 1910)
- Corcoran Gallery of Art, Washington, DC, (3rd Medal and $1,000 Prize in 1914)
- Panama Pacific Exposition, San Francisco, (gold medal in 1915)
- Art Institute of Chicago, International Watercolor Exhibition, (Blair Prize in 1930)
- Exposition Internationale des Arts et Techniques dans la Vie Moderne (1937), Paris, (silver medal in 1937)
- National Academy of Design, New York, (Saltus Medal in 1948)
- National Academy of Design, New York, (Samuel Finley Breese Morse gold medal in 1954)
- National Academy of Design, New York, (Edward Palmer memorial Prize in 1955)

Beal was elected President of the Art Students League of New York in 1916, again in 1918, and from 1920 he held this office continuously until 1930, becoming the longest serving President in its history. He taught at The Art Students’ League in 1931 and 1932.

In 1920 Beal held his first one-man exhibition at Kraushaar Galleries in New York City. It was the beginning of a lifelong relationship he would have with the gallery. His work was exhibited continuously in the country.

Beal’s involvement with organizations for the advancement of the arts began in 1908 when he was elected to Associate by the National Academy of Design; in 1914 he was elected to National Academician. In 1923 he became a member of the National Institute of Arts and Letters, and in 1943 he became a member of the American Academy of Arts and Letters. He was a National Academician of the American Watercolor Society from 1910 until 1955. He was also a member of the Century Association, a New York City club founded in 1847 for artists and writers.

Beal also taught, and among his pupils was the painter Ann Brockman. His work was part of the painting event in the art competition at the 1936 Summer Olympics.

== Museums and government buildings ==
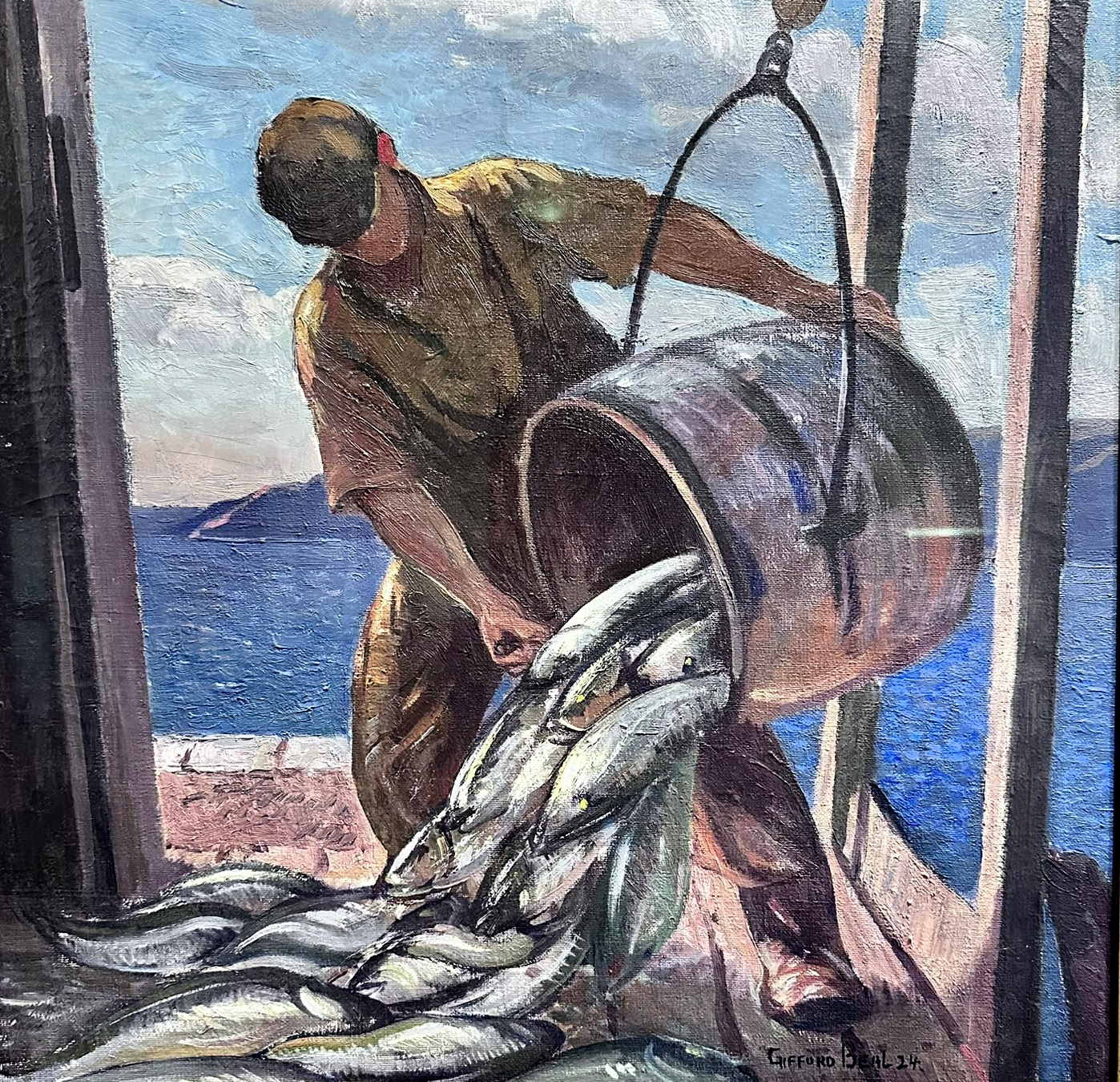
The Fish Bucket (1924), The Phillips Collection

Beal’s work is held in an array of museum collections:

- Metropolitan Museum, New York City
- Whitney Museum of American Art, New York City
- Cleveland Museum of Art, Ohio
- The Phillips Collection, Washington D.C.
- Los Angeles County Museum of Art, California
- Detroit Institute of Arts, Michigan
- Art Institute of Chicago, Illinois
- Nelson-Atkins Museum of Art, Kansas City, Missouri
- Florence Griswold Museum, Old Lyme, Connecticut
- New Britain Museum of American Art, New Britain, Connecticut
- Virginia Museum of Fine Arts, Richmond, Virginia
- Hudson River Museum, Yonkers, New York
- Telfair Museums, Georgia
- Frye Art Museums, Washington
- Amon Carter Museum of American Art, Texas
- Crystal Bridges Museum of American Art, Arkansas
- Virginia Museum of Fine Arts, Virginia
- McNay Art Museum, Texas
- Indianapolis Museum of Art, Indiana
- Canton Museum of Art, Ohio
- Terra Foundation for American Art, Illinois
- Smithsonian American Art Museum, Washington D.C.
- British Museum, London, England
- Everson Museum of Art, New York
- Princeton University Art Museum, New Jersey
- Brooklyn Museum, New York
- University of Michigan Museum of Art, Michigan
- Mildred Lane Kemper Art Museum, Missouri
- New-York Historical Society, New York
- New Britain Museum of American Art, Connecticut
- Maier Museum of Art, Lynchburg, Virginia

Beal was commissioned to produce murals for several government buildings:

- Allentown, Pennsylvania, Post Office, 1938
- Main Interior Building, Washington D.C., 1941
- Crestline, Ohio Post Office, 1943

== Gifford Beal Archive ==
The Smithsonian Institution in Washington D.C. holds an archive concerning Beal’s career as an artist containing correspondence, writings, works of art and printed material, much of it provided by Kraushaar Galleries, New York City. This collection has been fully digitized and is available online.

== Style and inspiration ==
Beal’s subjects varied. He found inspiration not only in holiday spectacle and pageantry but also in the natural and everyday side of life. Some of his best known pictures are of holiday crowds, circus performers and hunting scenes. Yet, Beal enjoyed painting the Caribbean Islands and the landscape along the Hudson River and in Gloucester and Rockport, Massachusetts, where he spent many summers. He depicted many scenes of the fishermen who worked there.

The French Impressionists' use of color and light to create form and atmosphere provided Beal's first influence. As his personal style developed, other elements of painting were emphasized: compositions were built on line and form thereby adding more solidity to the work. For example, he depended on balanced, rhythmic elements to depict motion in riding or fishing scenes. Beal believed in the power of spontaneity and would sometimes rework a "dead" area of color with line in order to revitalize it.

Beal's style underwent a simplification in the 1930s, his "austere" phase which coincided with American regionalism. As he grew older, his work became increasingly free and spirited, in part due to his exploration of different media, especially egg/oil tempera and brush and ink. These changes increased his sense of color and gesture, and he began to emphasize the abstract qualities of his subject. He did some of his boldest and brightest work during the last years of his life.
