= Reynolds Beal =

American artist

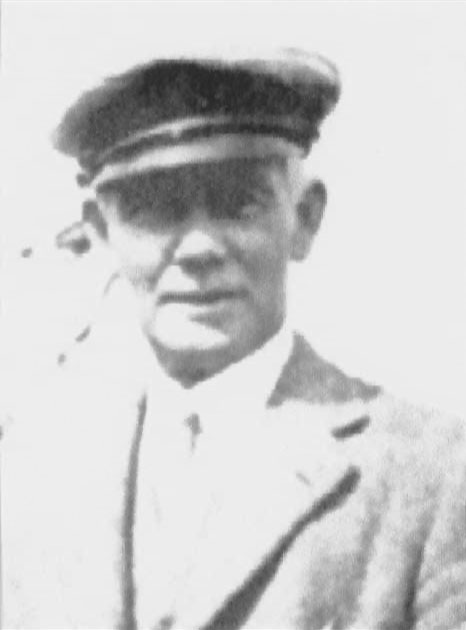
- Portrait of Reynolds Beal
- Born: October 12, 1866; New York City
- Died: December 18, 1951 (aged 85); Rockport, Massachusetts
- Known for: Painting
- Movement: Impressionist; Modernist
- Relatives: Gifford Beal (brother)

Reynolds Beal (October 11, 1866 – December 18, 1951) was an American Impressionist and Modernist artist.

== Early life and career ==
The elder brother of painter Gifford Beal, Reynolds was born in New York City. He and his brother Gifford spent their summers at Wilellyn in Newburgh, New York, on the Hudson River, and together they would later design the gardens at Wilellyn. His father was William Reynolds Beal, whose brother Thaddeus owned Echo Lawn, not far away. Beal was a man of independent means, and was thus able to devote his life to his art without having always to appeal to the tastes of his patrons or to contemporary trends.

Beal showed artistic ability from an early age, but temporarily postponed his creative interests to enroll at university. He first studied at Cornell University (naval architecture), where he was a member of the Phi Kappa Psi fraternity and the Irving Literary Society. Beal painted and sketched in and around Cayuga Lake. His home haunts of the East River were the first subjects of his work; in Sibley Hall’s drafting bays he learned further technique as a budding naval architect. Although the “Sibley time” constitutes his first artistic experience, it was not until the years following graduation that Beal became serious about a painting career.

== Painting ==
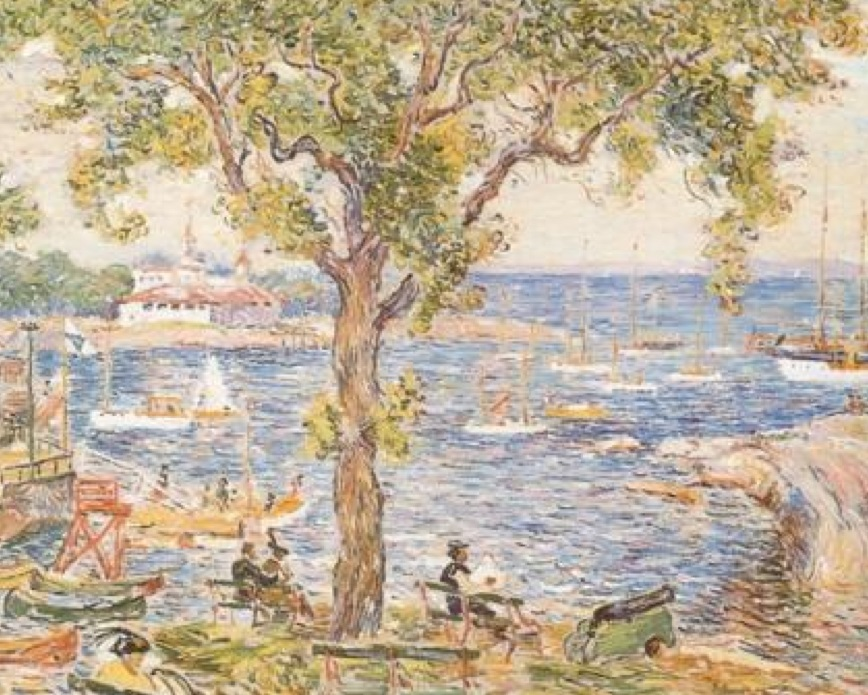
Reynolds Beal, Echo Bay, New Rochelle, 1914

Beal spent 1901 at sea, and worked up his sketchbook entitled Cruising Aboard U.S.S. School Ship St. Mary's (1901), he kept scrapbook pages of marine etchings and photographs, old Christmas cards, personal photographs, exhibition catalogs, and clippings.

From 1900 to 1907, he painted almost exclusively at the artist's community in Noank, Connecticut with Henry Ward Ranger. After 1912, Beal focused more on the Hudson Valley, where he painted the colorful and whimsical scenes of the traveling circuses that came through the region. His most prolific artistic period falls between the years 1910–1920.

Beal painted the beaches in Provincetown, Key West, Rockport, Atlantic City and Wellfleet, circus scenes and carnivals. He used a variety of styles including Impressionism and Tonalism. As he got older, his work became more complex and vibrant. In addition to oils, he was admired as a watercolorist, and he and Gifford made Rockport, Massachusetts their home. At one time, he resided in Gloucester, Massachusetts, as well. His studio overlooked Rockport's Inner Harbor, from where he drew and etched many harbor scenes.

Beal traveled widely. In November 1944, Reynolds and Gifford had a large joint exhibition at the Fitchburg Art Center (now Museum) in Fitchburg, MA, which included eighty-three oils, watercolors, and etchings that had been executed all over the world with subjects including Singapore, Trinidad, Samoa, China, Nassau, Egypt, Haiti, Cape Ann, Atlantic City, and Provincetown.

Beal was active in the art community. By 1934, he was a participant in the Salmagundi Club, Lotus Club, Century Club, National Academy of Design and the American Water Color Society. He was also a member of the Society of American Engravers, the Society of American Graphic Artists and the National Arts Council. His progressive tenets marked him as a "modernist", and he helped found the Society of Independent Artists and the New Society of Artists, which consisted of fifty of the most important painters of the day, including George Bellows, Childe Hassam, John Sloan, William Glackens and Maurice Prendergast. His work was also part of the painting event in the art competition at the 1932 Summer Olympics.

== Later years ==
Illness prevented Beal from painting in oil as spontaneously as he would have liked, and by 1940 he almost stopped painting. Reynolds Beal died in Rockport, Massachusetts, in 1951.

One curator summarized his life of excellence in a note tagged to his Eddyville paintings:

Reynolds Beal helped drive American impressionism as the 20th century got underway. Like Lever and Lawson, he favored the Fauvistic direction, with its strong link to the radical childlike innocence of the American land.
