= Hutchings =

Hutchings is a surname of English and Scottish origin. People with the surname include:

- Alex Hutchings (ice hockey) (born 1990), Canadian ice hockey player
- Arthur Hutchings (1906–1989), English musicologist
- Ashley Hutchings (born 1945), English folk musician
- Carl Hutchings (born 1974), English footballer
- Chris Hutchings (born 1957), English footballer
- Cory Hutchings (born 1972), New Zealand surf lifesaver
- E. T. Hutchings (1886–1958), American architect
- Frederick Hutchings (1880–1934), English cricketer
- Geoffrey Hutchings (1939–2010), English actor
- Graham Hutchings, British chemist
- Gudie Hutchings (born 1959), Canadian politician
- Ian Hutchings (born 1968), Zimbabwean golfer
- Jack Hutchings (1882–1966), New Zealand cricketer
- James Mason Hutchings (1820–1902), American businessman
- Jamie Hutchings (born 1971), Australian rock musician
- Jaylon Hutchings (born 1999), American football player
- Jeffrey A. Hutchings (1958–2022), Canadian scientist
- John Hutchings, a British sailor killed in the Icarus affair
- Johnny Hutchings (1916–1963), American baseball pitcher
- Keith Hutchings, Canadian politician
- Kenneth Hutchings (1882–1916), English cricketer
- Kimberly Hutchings, British academic
- Mark Hutchings (born 1991), Australian rules footballer
- Michael Hutchings (chef) (born 1949), American chef
- Michael Hutchings (mathematician), American mathematician
- Noah Hutchings (1922–2015), American religious broadcaster
- Phyllis Hayford Hutchings (1904–1965), American astronomer
- Richard Hutchings (born 1978), English cricketer
- Robert Hutchings, American academic
- Sarah Hutchings (born 1984), American composer
- Steve Hutchings (born 1990), English footballer
- Stuart James Hutchings (born 1951), Welsh chess master
- Tim Hutchings (born 1958), English runner
- William Hutchings (1879–1948), English cricketer
- William S. Hutchings (1832–1911), American mathematics prodigy

== See also ==
- Hutchence, surname
- Hutchins (surname)
- Hutchinson (surname)
