= Hutchins =

Hutchins may refer to:

== Places in the United States ==
- Hutchins, Georgia, an unincorporated community
- Hutchins, Iowa, an unincorporated community
- Hutchins, Kansas, an unincorporated community
- Hutchins, Texas, a city
- Hutchins, Wisconsin, a town

== Other uses ==
- Hutchins (surname)
- Hutchins violins, also known as the Violin octet
- Hutchins Yachts, manufacturers of Com-Pac sailboats

== See also ==
- The Hutchins School, Anglican day and board school for boys, Australia
- Hutchens (disambiguation)
- Hitchens
- Hutchinson (disambiguation)
