= John Hutchings =

John Hutchings may refer to:

- John Hutchings (slave trader) (c. 1775–1817), kin to U.S. president Andrew Jackson
- John Hutchings (politician) (1691–1768), American merchant and politician in Virginia
- John Hutchings (died 1867), a victim of the Icarus affair
- John Bacon Hutchings (1859–1916), architect and father of E.T. Hutchings
- John Fenwick Hutchings (1885–1968), British Royal Navy officer
- Johnny Hutchings (1916–1963), American baseball player
- Jack Hutchings (John Henry Hutchings), New Zealand cricketer
