= Houchen =

Houchen is a surname, which is a variation on Hutchin. Notable people with the surname include:

- Ben Houchen (born 1986), mayor of Tees Valley, England.
- Joan Houchen (1930–2020), American politician
- Keith Houchen (born 1960), British footballer and football manager

== See also ==
- Houchin (surname)
