= Kobe Incident =

Diplomatic incident between Japan and Western powers

Kobe incident
- Date: February 4, 1868
- Location: Between Tamondori and the Ikuta Shrine in Kobe
- Also known as: Bizen incident
- Cause: Tension between marching Japanese Imperial-allied forces of Bizen province and foreign soldiers along the route.
- Participants: Two men of French origin; Armed men from the Kobe foreign settlement of several nationalities; 50 American Marines, landed from US Navy ships off Kobe; A "Coolie" of either Chinese or Indian origin; Bizen men; 500 (alternately 800) soldiers of Bizen Domain
- Outcome: Temporary occupation of central Kobe by foreign forces, lifted after execution by seppuku of Japanese squad leader; official transition of international relations from Shogunal to Imperial hands.
- Convicted: Taki Zenzaburo (jp)

The Kobe incident (Japanese: 神戸事件, Hepburn: kōbe jiken), also known in Japanese as the Bizen incident (備前事件, bizen jiken) and in English as the Bizen affray or Bizen affair, was a diplomatic incident between Imperial Japan and several Western powers, caused by a skirmish on February 4, 1868, between Bizen soldiers and foreign sailors. It developed into a crisis in Franco–Japanese relations, becoming the first major international affairs challenge for the fledgling Imperial faction.

The incident occurred during a period of time very shortly after Hyōgo Port was opened to trade, and a day after the outbreak of fighting in Kyoto, leading to the Boshin war. A column of soldiers from Bizen marched through the city to the proposed location of the foreign settlement (then an empty plain) on their way to garrison Nishinomiya. While en route through the city, two French sailors walked in front of the column of the Bizen troops, a severe slight in Japanese martial culture, prompting one of the officers leading the march to shoot one of the sailors. Great alarm was stirred among the foreigners, some sailors and marines were debarked from the British flotilla, there upon pursued the Bizen soldiers to the hills where a skirmish ensued, in which one Japanese old woman was wounded in both heels by a bullet and a porter who was hiding near a road was nearly killed by the foreign soldiers. The community of foreign merchants and soldiers were living and working in the Kobe foreign settlement. In response, the foreign militaries seized nearby Japanese warships and occupied the center of the city under the pretense of protecting their settlement. The Imperial court sent a representative to negotiate and inform the Westerners that power had shifted from the Tokugawa Shogunate to the newly-formed Imperial government. The Western representatives demanded Taki Zenzaburo, who was involved, be executed; Taki committed ceremonial seppuku on March 3.

== Initial incident ==
On January 27, 1868, with the outbreak of the Boshin War, the new Restoration faction ordered that Nishinomiya in Settsu be guarded in order to check the pro-Shogunate forces of Amagasaki Domain. By the 29th, 2,000 troops had been raised in Bizen Domain to the west, and among these were 500 (alternately 800) troops under the command of the domain's karō Heki Tatewaki (日置帯刀), accompanied by cannons, who marched over land for their destination. Because the port of Hyōgo had been opened on January 1, the troops advanced on the Saikoku Kaidō (西国街道) road rather than that built by the Tokugawa shogunate, in an effort to avoid encounters with enemy forces or foreigners.

Sometime after 1 o'clock on February 4, as the line of Bizen troops marched along in the vicinity of Sannomiya Shrine, two French sailors emerged from a nearby building and attempted to cross the line. The Japanese troops saw this as constituting tomowari (供割), an act of extreme disrespect under the Laws for the Military Houses, and Taki Zenzaburo, in charge of the third cannon group, took a spear and attempted to stop them. However, neither side could understand the other, and when the sailors attempted to force their way through, Taki stabbed at them with his spear, inflicting light wounds.

The sailors briefly retreated indoors but reemerged with handguns. Taki, seeing this, shouted out "Guns, guns!", which his troops took as an order to shoot, beginning a firefight. The roadside skirmish soon also targeted the European and American dignitaries who were inspecting the adjacent planned site of a foreign settlement, and several full volleys were fired. Most of the bullets missed and flew over the heads of their intended targets, but did pierce the various foreign flags flying over the old Shogunate customs house on the other side of the planned site. Whether this was warning fire or simply badly aimed shots intended to kill was unclear even in the testimony of Western witnesses.

== Foreign response ==
The British envoy Harry Smith Parkes, who happened to be present at the skirmish, was enraged, and notified the vessels of various nations present to celebrate the opening of the port of Hyōgo of a state of emergency. U.S. Marines, British guardsmen, and French sailors pursued the Bizen troops outside of the foreign settlement and exchanged fire at Ikuta River. On the Bizen side, Heki ordered his troops to cease fire and withdraw. There was one "coolie" killed, and a few wounded on either side.

On that same day, the Great Powers that possessed consulates in Kobe militarily occupied central Kobe under the pretext of protecting the foreign settlement, and seized the Tokugawa warships anchored off the Hyōgo port. At this point in time, the Japanese imperial court had not yet informed foreign countries of the transition of power from the Shogunate to the Meiji government, and Itō Hirobumi attempted negotiations that quickly broke down.

On February 8, the imperial court hurriedly announced the transfer of power to the Meiji government and declared the opening of Japan. Higashikuze Michitomi was assigned as a representative and reopened negotiations.

The foreign countries demanded safety for their people and harsh punishment for the Japanese person responsible for the incident—in short, Taki's execution. There was some complaint that this was too harsh for an incident in which no one had actually died, and to the Japanese Taki's response to the foreign troops' tomowari seemed altogether natural, but in the face of a demand from the Great Powers there was nothing to be done. Date Munenari sent an appeal for clemency via Itō Hirobumi and Godai Tomoatsu, which arrived just in time, but was rejected by a vote of the foreign ministers, beginning with the French Consul General Léon Roches.

Finally, on February 24, Bizen Domain acceded to the foreign countries' demands. Taki committed seppuku before the assembled foreign officials at Eifuku-ji Temple in Osaka on March 3. Heki, who had been in command of the troops, was simultaneously placed under house arrest, and the incident was tentatively resolved.

== Significance ==
The Kobe Incident represented the first international diplomatic incident faced by the then tentative and transitory imperial court after the concession of the Shogunate's Baku-fu government, although it was neither a novel nor a new occurrence, in fact the British legation lost no time in haranguing the emperor's representatives over the murder of two British sailors in the pleasure district of Nagasaki. Foreigners were killed very regularly in Japan at the time, owing to the expulsionist sentiment fostered by the imperial court and the Satsuma & Choshu clans (later largely redacted). These incidents were often beneficial to the western treaty powers as they offered ways to impose more concessions on the Japanese or demand steep indemnities. Though this incident was ultimately resolved when the foreign powers forced the execution of Taki Zenzaburo (jp), it did demonstrate to them that the imperial court was now the ruling administration to deal with in terms of Japan's foreign policy. Furthermore, this incident showed the court's foreign-relations philosophy turning quickly from that of "expel the barbarians" (攘夷, jōi) to "opening the country in peace and amity" (開国和親, kaikoku washin). However, as the jōi faction did retain support in the new administration, the new foreign policy was not made clear internally. An official declaration of the change was finally made the next year, on July 7, 1869, based on a decision by the jōkyoku kaigi (上局会議) national council.

== See also ==
- The Namamugi Incident, also known as the Robinson Affair or Richardson incident, in which, similarly, a foreigner walked into the middle of a procession and was promptly dispatched.
- The Sakai incident
- The Icarus affair
