= Hutchence =

- Pronunciation: /ˈhʌtʃ.ənts/

Origin
- Origin: Old English
- Meaning: From heart, mind, or spirit
- Region of origin: England

Other names
- Variant form: Numerous

Hutchence is an English surname and rare male given name. It derives from the medieval given name Huchin, a diminutive of Hugh. Notable people with the name include:

- Michael Hutchence (1960–1997), Australian vocalist for INXS
- Patricia Hutchence (1926–2010), later Patricia Glassop, Australian film and television makeup artist, mother of Michael

== See also ==
- Hutchens (disambiguation)
- Hutchins (surname)
- Hutchinson (surname)
- Hutchings
