= Johanna Meyer-Udewald =

Dr. Johanna Meyer-Udewald was a German Jewish art collector murdered by the Nazis at Auschwitz. A Picasso she owned was the object of a complicated restitution resolution involving three families.

== Early life ==
Born in 1894 into a Jewish family in Hamburg, Meyer-Udewald lived at Jungfrauenthal 22 She worked as a dentist in Hamburg until the Nazis forced her to flee.

== Picasso's Nature morte au tableau ==
In 1925, Meyer-Edewald was the beneficiary of a gift from a friend, Ernst Schlesinger, who bequeathed to her the usufruct of a Picasso painting ("Nature morte au tableau"). The itinerary and ownership history of the painting would take many years to uncover, involving many actors in the art market, the cultural heritage sector, Holocaust and provenance researchers.

== Nazi era ==
When the Nazis came to power in 1933, Johanna Meyer-Udewald was persecuted because of her Jewish heritage. She fled Nazi Germany in 1937.

In 1939, while a refugee in the Netherlands, she lent the painting to the Stedelijk Museum in Amsterdam for an exhibition entitled Parijsche Schilders. In 1940, she fled to Belgium but when the Nazis occupied Belgium, she was arrested. On September 20, 1943, Johanna Meyer-Udewald was deported to Auschwitz where she was murdered .

After Meyer-Udewald was dispossessed and murdered by the Nazis, the Picasso painting ended up in the collection of Duncan C. Phillips.

Fifty years later, with the help of the Art Loss Register, the heirs of Ernst Schlesinger and Duncan C. Phillips signed an ownership agreement, the terms of which were kept secret. The painting was sold by Christie's in 2006. The painting's history was researched and it was discovered that, in 1942, Nature morte au tableau came into the possession of Joseph Albert Dederen, a resident of Brussels.

However, according to the terms of Schlesinger's gift, on the death of Meyer-Udewald, it was supposed to have been returned to Ernst Schlesinger's wife, Käthe Schlesinger.

=== Search for information ===
In 2002, Johanna Meyer-Udewald's heirs contacted the Art Loss Register (ALR) to register the painting in their database. As proof of ownership, they provided a page from a catalog relating to an exhibition held at the Stedelijk Museum in Amsterdam in 1939, which stated that the painting had been on loan from a private collector. The museum archives identified Johanna Meyer-Udewald as the lender. The ALR located the work in the collection of Duncan V. Phillips in Chicago and discovered that Ernst Schlesinger's will specified the painting should return to his widow after Meyer-Udewald's death.

The case was complicated because it involved three families, including a Holocaust victim and a famous American collector, as well as a complicated legacy involving usufruct. A multiyear, multicountry investigation was necessary to discover how the painting had come into the hands of Duncan V. Phillips. During this investigation, the ALR discovered Ernst Schlesinger's will, which revealed that the Meyer-Udewald heirs were not the legatees of the painting, their great-aunt having received only the usufruct of the canvas.

The itinerary of the painting after Meyer-Udewald's murder included, in 1950, Dr. Georges Robyn, the Bolag Gallery in Zurich, Galerie D. Benador in Geneva. In 1952, Duncan C. Phillips acquired the painting in Geneva and offered it to his wife Marjorie Acker Phillips. In 1985, on the death of Marjorie Acker Phillips, her grandson Duncan V. Phillips inherited the painting.

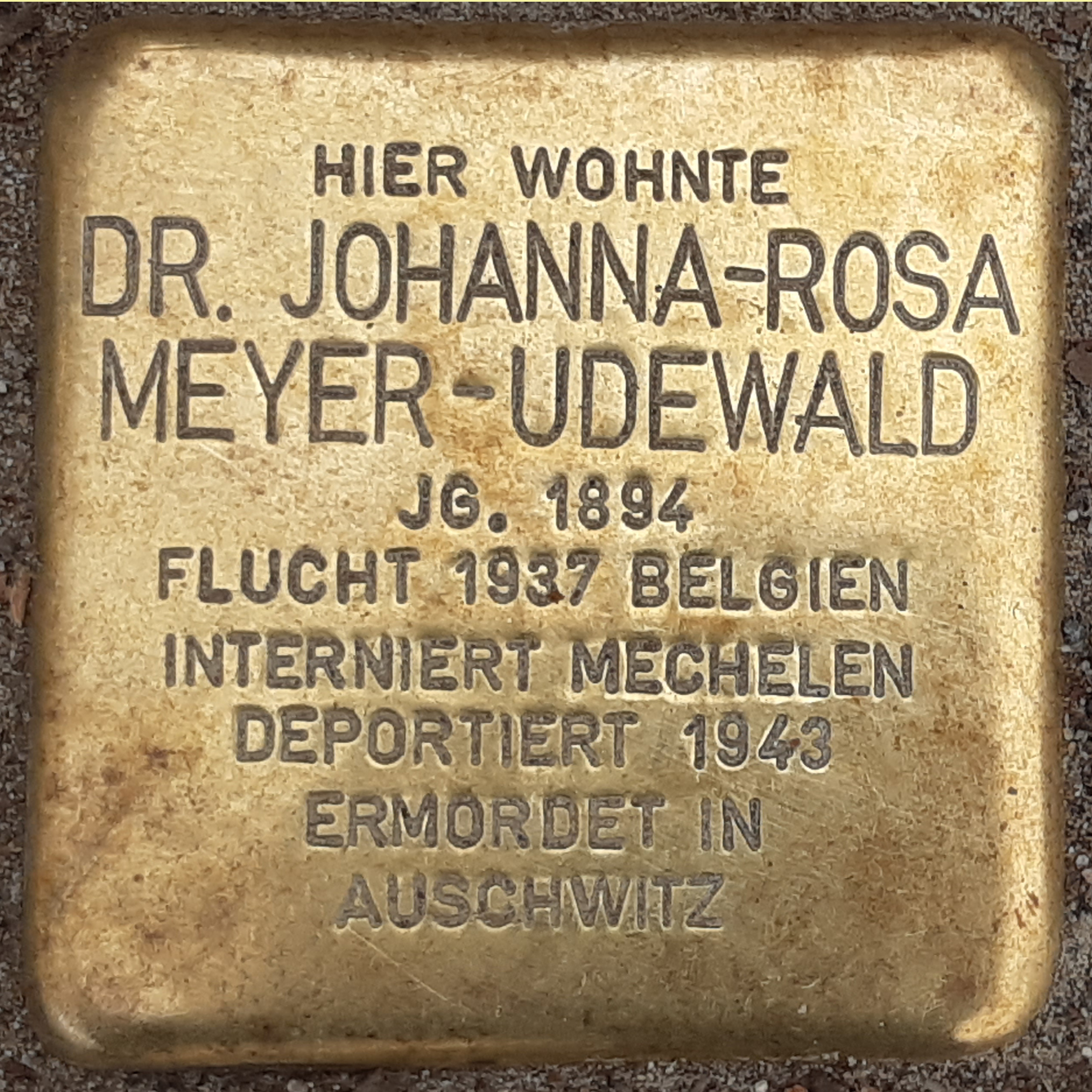
Memorial Stolperstein in Hamburg for Johanna Rosa Meyer Udewald

A memorial "stumbling block" (Stolpersteine) was posed in her memory in Hamburg, with the words: "Dr. Johanna-Rosa Meyer-Udewald, born 1894, lived here. Escape 1937 Belgium interned Mechelen deported 1943 murdered in Auschwitz." Other inhabitants who were commemorated by Stolpersteine at the same address, Jungfrauenthal 22, included Jenny Breslauer, Paula Breslauer, Hans Meyer-Udewald and Valentine Meyer-Udewald, all murdered in the Holocaust.

== See also ==
- List of claims for restitution for Nazi-looted art
- Nazi Germany
- List of Commemorative stones for Holocaust victims in Hamburg Harvestehude
