= Hutchins (surname) =

Hutchins is an English surname. Notable people with the surname include:

- Bobby Hutchins (1925–1945), American child actor
- Carleen Hutchins (1911–2009), American musical instrument inventor
- Carlton B. Hutchins (1904–1938), US Navy Medal of Honor awardee
- Charles P. Hutchins (1872–1938), American college sports coach
- Edward John Hutchins (1809–1876), a Liberal MP in the UK Parliament
- Edwin Hutchins (born 1948), American cognitive scientist
- Ellen Hutchins (1785–1815), Irish botanist
- Frank Avery Hutchins (1851-1914), American librarian
- Fyfe Hutchins (born 1980), aka Fyfe Dangerfield, British musician
- Halyna Hutchins (1979–2021), Ukrainian-American cinematographer
- Hazel Hutchins, Canadian children's author
- J. C. Hutchins (born 1975), American author and podcaster
- J. Weston Hutchins (1854–1943), American politician
- James Hutchins (disambiguation), several people
- Jessica Jackson Hutchins (born 1971), American artist
- Lawrence Hutchins III, United States Marine Corps infantryman involved in the Hamdania incident
- Levi Hutchins (1761-1855), American clockmaker
- Loraine Hutchins (1948–2025), American feminist writer
- Marcus Hutchins (born 1994), British cybersecurity researcher
- Maude Hutchins (1899–1991), American novelist
- Meg Hutchins (born 1982), Australian rules footballer
- Mel Hutchins (1928–2018), American basketball player
- Norman Hutchins (1962–2025), American gospel musician
- Quintayvious Hutchins (born 2003), American football player
- Paul Hutchins (1945–2019), British tennis player
- Robert Maynard Hutchins (1899–1977), American educational philosopher
- Robert Owen Hutchins (1939–2009), American organic chemist and educator
- Ross Arnold Hutchins (born 1985), British tennis player
- Scott Hutchins (born 1974), American author
- Sonny Hutchins (1929–2005), American racing driver
- Sophia Hutchins (1996–2025), American talent manager, charity executive, and television personality
- Steve Hutchins (1956–2017), Australian politician
- Stilson Hutchins (1838–1912), American newspaper reporter and publisher, founder of The Washington Post
- Thomas Hutchins (1730–1789), American geographer
- Thomas E. Hutchins, American politician
- Von Hutchins (born 1981), American football player
- W. John Hutchins (1939–2021), English linguist and information scientist
- Will Hutchins (1930–2025), American actor
- Will Hutchins (painter) (1878–1949), American painter and writer
- William Hutchins (1792–1841), Anglican Archdeacon of Van Diemen's Land

== See also ==
- Hutchence, surname
- Hutchings, surname
- Hutchinson (surname)
