= Laughlin Phillips =

American museum director and painter

- Laughlin Phillips in 1988
- Born: October 20, 1924; Washington, D.C., U.S.
- Died: January 24, 2010 (aged 85); Washington, Connecticut, U.S.
- Occupation: Director of The Phillips Collection
- Spouse(s): Elizabeth Hood (divorced); Jennifer Stats Cafritz (until his death)
- Children: Duncan V. Phillips, Liza Phillips (stepchildren) Julia Cafritz, Daisy von Furth, Eric Cafritz, Matthew Cafritz
- Parent(s): Duncan Phillips; Marjorie Acker Phillips

Laughlin Phillips (October 20, 1924 – January 24, 2010), also known as Loc Phillips, was an American museum director from Washington, D.C. The son of wealthy art collectors, he managed The Phillips Collection, a museum founded by his parents. Under his leadership, the museum increased its collection, underwent expansion projects and received substantial financial support.

Prior to his career as a museum director, Phillips served during World War II, worked as an analyst for the Central Intelligence Agency (CIA) and co-founded a local magazine. He also co-founded the magazine Washingtonian.

== Early life ==
Laughlin Phillips, nicknamed "Loc," was born in Washington, D.C., in 1924, the son of Duncan Phillips, an art collector and critic, and Marjorie Acker Phillips, a painter. He had one sibling, Mary Marjorie, born in 1922, who contracted encephalitis at a young age and was institutionalized. According to Phillips, "she was severely brain damaged and never got beyond being four years old."

Phillips was named after his great-grandfather, James H. Laughlin, co-founder of the Jones and Laughlin Steel Company and chair of the Pittsburgh National Bank (a precursor to PNC Financial Services). Three years prior to Phillips' birth, Duncan and Marjorie founded the Phillips Memorial Gallery, the United States' first museum of modern art. The museum was located in the Phillips' home, a Georgian Revival house in Dupont Circle where Laughlin spent his early childhood. In 1930, the family moved to another house, Dunmarlin, a 17,000 sq ft (1,600 m^{2}) mansion on Foxhall Road NW designed by architect John Russell Pope, to increase the museum's gallery space.

During his childhood, Dunmarlin was a noted meeting place for diplomats, politicians and artists. Phillips attended special events and exhibits, including a photography exhibit where his own work was displayed. He was chauffeured each day to St. Albans School, an elite private school where he graduated in 1942.

== Career ==
Following his graduation, Phillips attended Yale University, his father's alma mater, for one year before serving in World War II. Phillips conducted two months of training at Camp Ritchie, Maryland and joined the ranks of the Ritchie Boys for his time there. He was an Army intelligence officer in the Pacific theater and earned a Bronze Star Medal. After the war, Phillips attended the University of Chicago using benefits provided by the G.I. Bill.

Phillips began working for the CIA after earning a Master of Philosophy degree. Around this time Phillips married Elizabeth Hood with whom he had two children, Duncan and Liza. The couple later divorced and he married his second wife, Jennifer Stats Cafritz.While working for the CIA, Phillips was stationed in several locations, including Saigon and Tehran. He left the CIA and in 1965 co-founded the Washingtonian magazine, a venture with his former college roommate and CIA colleague, Robert J. Myers. Following his father's death in 1966, Phillips began serving as board chairman of the museum. His mother was the director of the museum until 1972, when Phillips assumed the role. He sold his stake in the magazine in 1979 to devote all of his time to The Phillips Collection, at the time a "deteriorating jewel box of a museum", calling it "a family responsibility."

During his tenure as director of The Phillips Collection, Phillips "administrative skill helped guide" the museum into a "far more financially stable position." He oversaw the expansion of the museum's collection, including key purchases of works by Pierre Bonnard, Henri Matisse, Pablo Picasso and Jackson Pollock. Phillips also oversaw the expansion of the museum's facilities, including a renovation in 1983 and the addition of the Goh Annex in 1989, doubling the museum's space. He "supervised multi-million dollar fundraising campaigns, starting charging admission, established corporate and personal membership programs, and sought arts endowment grants that the museum had seldom if ever pursued." Phillips worked for fifteen years to help establish the museum's Center for the Study of Modern Art, "an interdisciplinary forum for scholarly discussion, research, and publication on issues of production."

For his successful efforts at improving the museum, Phillips was named a "Washingtonian of the Year" by Washingtonian magazine. He retired as museum director in 1992, and for the first time in its history, the museum was managed by someone other than a Phillips family member.

== Later years ==
Phillips continued serving as the museum's chairman of the board until March 2002. He and his wife, Jennifer, moved to Washington, Connecticut, a few years before his death in 2010 from prostate cancer. The couple had previously lived in Georgetown, in a 10,000 sq ft (930 m^{2}) home on O Street NW, after the Phillips estate, Dunmarlin, was purchased by a wealthy Saudi Arabian businessman and demolished.
