= The Phillips Collection =

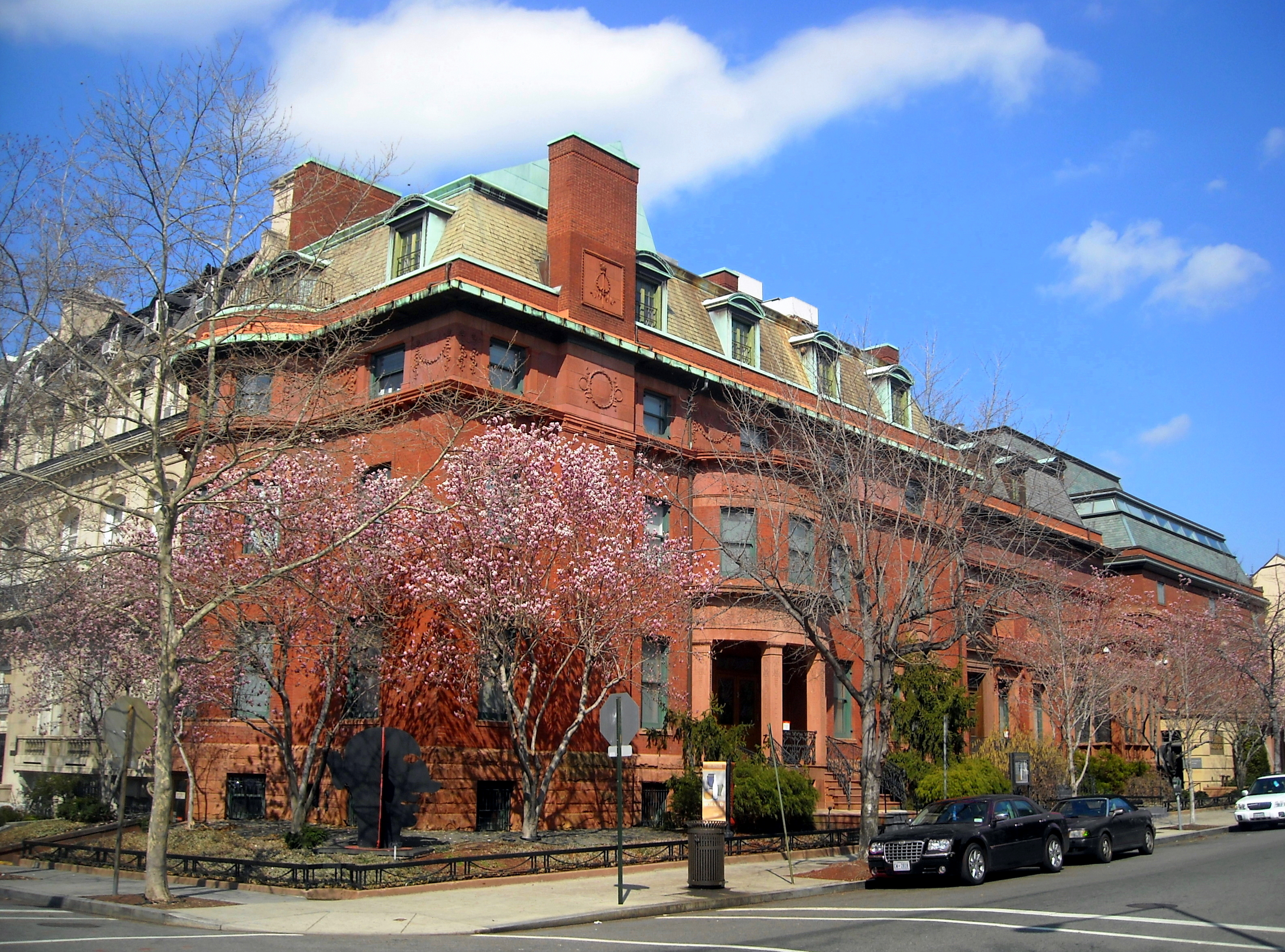
- The Phillips Collection building in Dupont Circle
- Interactive fullscreen map
- Established: 1921
- Location: 1600 21st Street NW Washington, D.C.
- Coordinates: 38°54′41″N 77°02′49″W
- Type: Art museum
- Director: Jonathan P. Binstock (since 2023)
- Public transit access: Dupont Circle
- Website: www.phillipscollection.org

The Phillips Collection is an art museum located in the Dupont Circle neighborhood of Washington, D.C. The museum was founded by art collectors Duncan Phillips and Marjorie Acker Phillips in 1921 as the Phillips Memorial Gallery. Phillips was the grandson of James H. Laughlin, a banker and co-founder of the Jones and Laughlin Steel Company.

Among the artists represented in the collection are Pierre-Auguste Renoir, Gustave Courbet, El Greco, Vincent van Gogh, Henri Matisse, Claude Monet, Pablo Picasso, Georges Braque, Pierre Bonnard, Paul Klee, Arthur Dove, Winslow Homer, James McNeill Whistler, Jacob Lawrence, Augustus Vincent Tack, Georgia O'Keeffe, Karel Appel, Joan Miró, Mark Rothko and Berenice Abbott.

== History ==
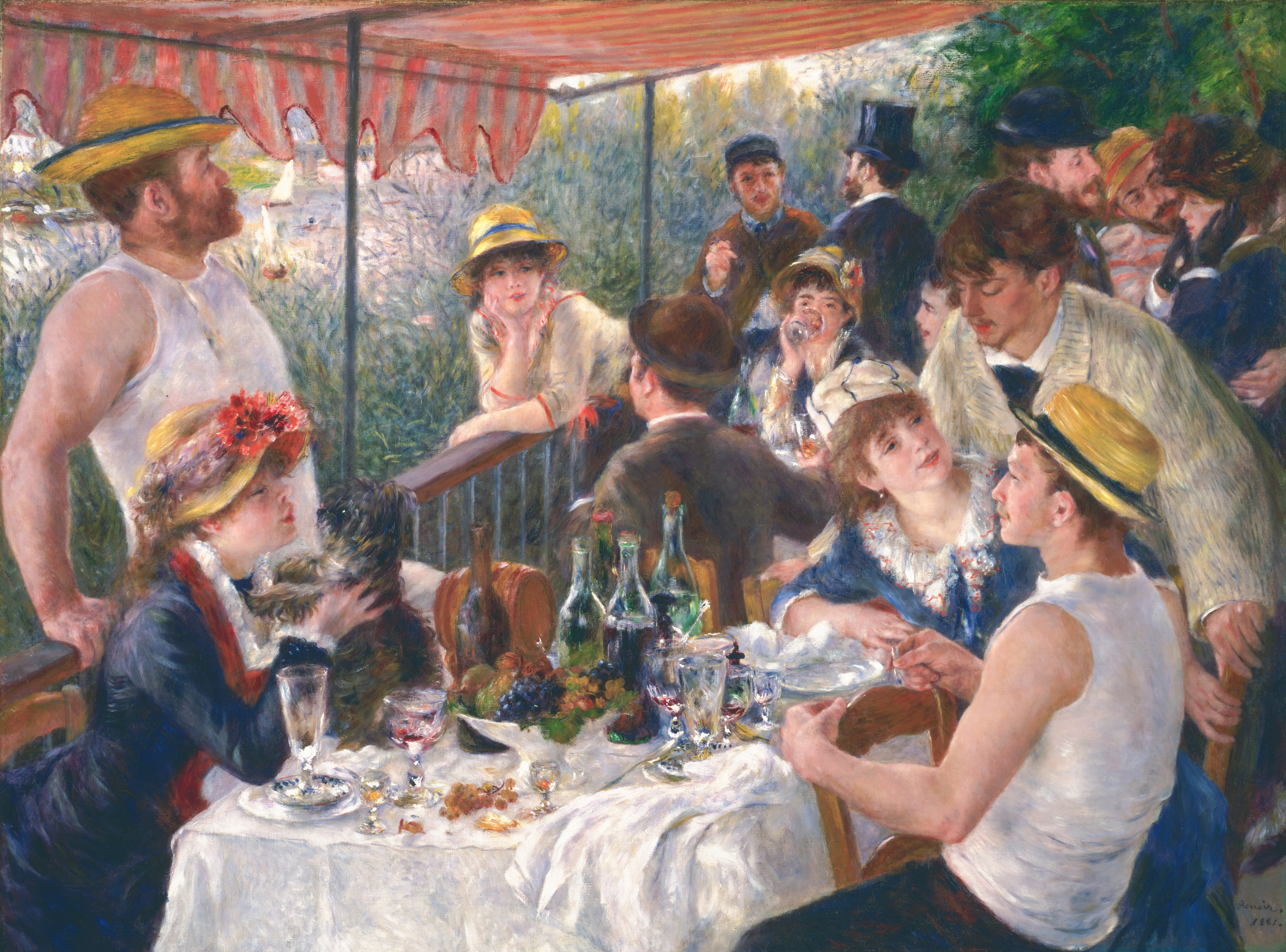
Luncheon of the Boating Party (1881) by Pierre-Auguste Renoir is part of the museum's permanent collection.

Duncan Phillips (1886–1966) played a seminal role in introducing America to modern art. Born in Pittsburgh—the grandson of James H. Laughlin, a banker and co-founder of the Jones and Laughlin Steel Company—Phillips and his family moved to Washington, D.C., in 1895. He, along with his mother, established The Phillips Memorial Gallery after the sudden, untimely deaths of his brother, James Laughlin Phillips (May 30, 1884 – 1918), and of his father, Duncan Clinch Phillips (1838–1917), a Pittsburgh window glass millionaire and member of the South Fork Fishing and Hunting Club, owners of the dam whose failure resulted in the Johnstown Flood.

Beginning with a small family collection of paintings, Phillips, a published art critic, expanded the collection dramatically. A specially built room over the north wing of the family home provided a public gallery space. With the collection exceeding 600 works and facing public demand, the Phillips family moved to a new home in 1930, turning the entire 21st Street residence into an art museum.

Duncan Phillips married painter Marjorie Acker in 1921. With her assistance and advice, Phillips developed his collection "as a museum of modern art and its sources", believing strongly in the continuum of artists influencing their successors through the centuries. His focus on the continuous tradition of art was revolutionary when America was largely critical of modernism, which was seen as a break from the past. Phillips collected works by masters such as El Greco, calling him the "first impassioned expressionist"; Jean-Baptiste-Siméon Chardin because he was "the first modern painter"; Francisco Goya because he was "the stepping stone between the Old Masters and the Great Moderns like Cézanne"; and Édouard Manet, a "significant link in a chain which began with Goya and which [led] to Gauguin and Matisse."

Polly Fritchey, hostess and wife of columnist Clayton Fritchey, helped the Phillips Collection evolve from a small family museum into a public art gallery and was one of the first trustees appointed from outside the family. Moreover, she helped launch its national fundraising campaign.

== Collection ==
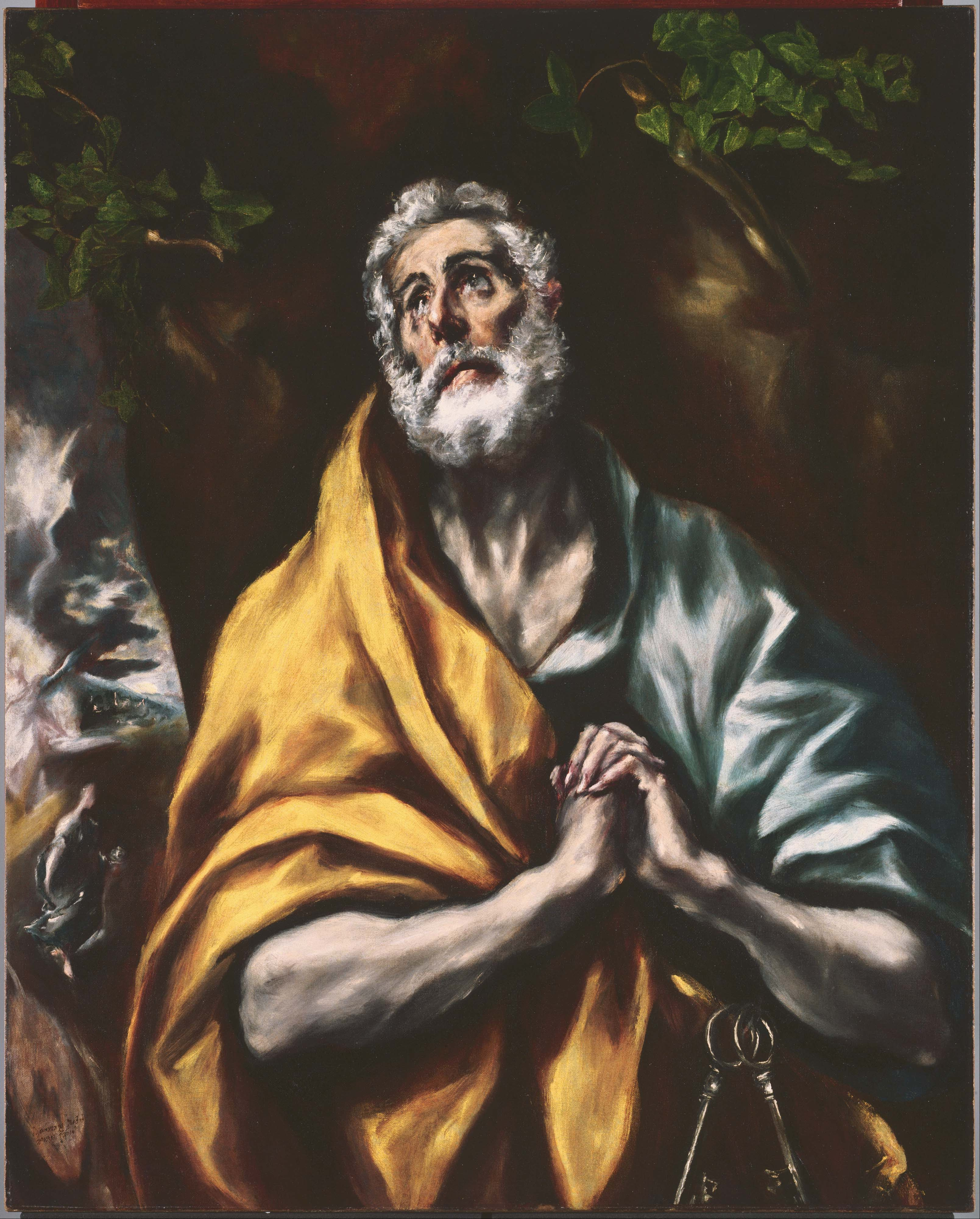
El Greco, The Repentant St. Peter, c. 1600-1605. A highlight of the collection. Duncan Phillips called El Greco "the first impassioned expressionist."

The Phillips Collection opened in 1921. Featuring a permanent collection of nearly 3,000 works by American and European impressionist and modern artists, the Phillips is recognized for both its art and its intimate atmosphere. It is housed in founder Duncan Phillips’ 1897 Georgian Revival home and two similarly scaled additions in Washington, D.C.’s Dupont Circle neighborhood.

The museum is noted for its broad representation of both impressionist and modern paintings, with works by European masters such as Gustave Courbet, Pierre Bonnard, Georges Braque, Jacques Villon, Paul Cézanne, Honoré Daumier, Edgar Degas, Vincent van Gogh, Paul Klee, Henri Matisse, Claude Monet, and Pablo Picasso. In 1923, Phillips purchased Pierre-Auguste Renoir's impressionist painting, Luncheon of the Boating Party (1880–81), the museum’s best-known work.

From the 1920s to the 1960s, Phillips re-arranged his galleries in installations that were non-chronological and non-traditional, reflecting the relationships he saw between various artistic expressions. He presented visual connections—between past and present, between classical form and romantic expression—as dialogues on the museum's walls. Giving equal focus to American and European artists, Phillips juxtaposed works by Winslow Homer, Thomas Eakins, Maurice Prendergast, James Abbott McNeill Whistler, and Albert Pinkham Ryder with canvases by Pierre Bonnard, Peter Ilsted and Édouard Vuillard. He exhibited watercolors by John Marin with paintings by Cézanne, and works by van Gogh with El Greco’s The Repentant St. Peter (circa 1600–05). Phillips’ vision brought together "congenial spirits among the artists," and his ideas still guide the museum today.

The Phillips Collection is also known for its groups of works by artists whom Phillips particularly favored. For example, he was overwhelmed by Bonnard's expressive use of color, acquiring 17 paintings by the artist. Cubist pioneer Braque is represented by 13 paintings, including the monumental still-life The Round Table (1929). The collection has an equal number of works by Klee, such as Arab Song (1932) and Picture Album (1937), as well as seven pieces by abstract expressionist artist Mark Rothko.

Augustus Vincent Tack, Time and Timelessness (The Spirit of Creation), 1943-1944, oil on canvas. Phillips was among the first to recognize Tack's paintings, the museum has more than 40 of his works.

The Rothko Room, the first public space dedicated solely to the artist's work, was designed by Phillips in keeping with Rothko's expressed preference for exhibiting his large, luminous paintings in a small, intimate space, saturating the room with color and sensation. The Rothko Room is the only existing installation for the artist's work in collaboration with the artist himself. Phillips was initially attracted to Rothko's work because he saw the use of color as similar to Bonnard's.

Throughout his lifetime, Phillips acquired paintings by many artists who were not fully recognized at the time, among them John Marin, Georgia O'Keeffe, Arthur Dove, Nicolas de Staël, Milton Avery, Betty Lane and Augustus Vincent Tack. By purchasing works by such promising but unknown artists, Phillips provided them with the means to continue painting. He formed close bonds with and subsidized several artists who are prominently featured in the collection—Dove and Marin in particular—and consistently purchased works by artists and students for what he called his "encouragement collection." The museum also served as a visual haven for artists such as Richard Diebenkorn, Gene Davis, and Kenneth Noland. In a 1982 tribute to the museum, Noland acknowledged, "I’ve spent many hours of many days in this home of art. You can be with art in the Phillips as in no other place I know."

In 2013, the museum opened its second permanent installation, a room covered in wax by artist Wolfgang Laib. Though Laib's work is often interpreted as evocative of nature, the piece, which is 6 feet by 7 feet and illuminated by one bare bulb, can also seem harsh and enigmatic. Laib became interested in the site-specific installation, which requires about 500 pounds of wax, after visiting the museum's Rothko Room.

In November 2025, it was announced that the Phillips collection would be deaccessioning and auctioning pieces from the collection, including works by O'Keeffe, Dove, and Georges Seurat, to create an endowment to commission new artwork in the future. This plan was opposed by supporters and members of the museum; a compromise was struck between them and the museum's board to not sell any other artwork belonging to the core collection of the museum, with the 1985 guidebook "The Phillips Collection: A Summary Catalogue" serving to define the core collection.

== Building ==
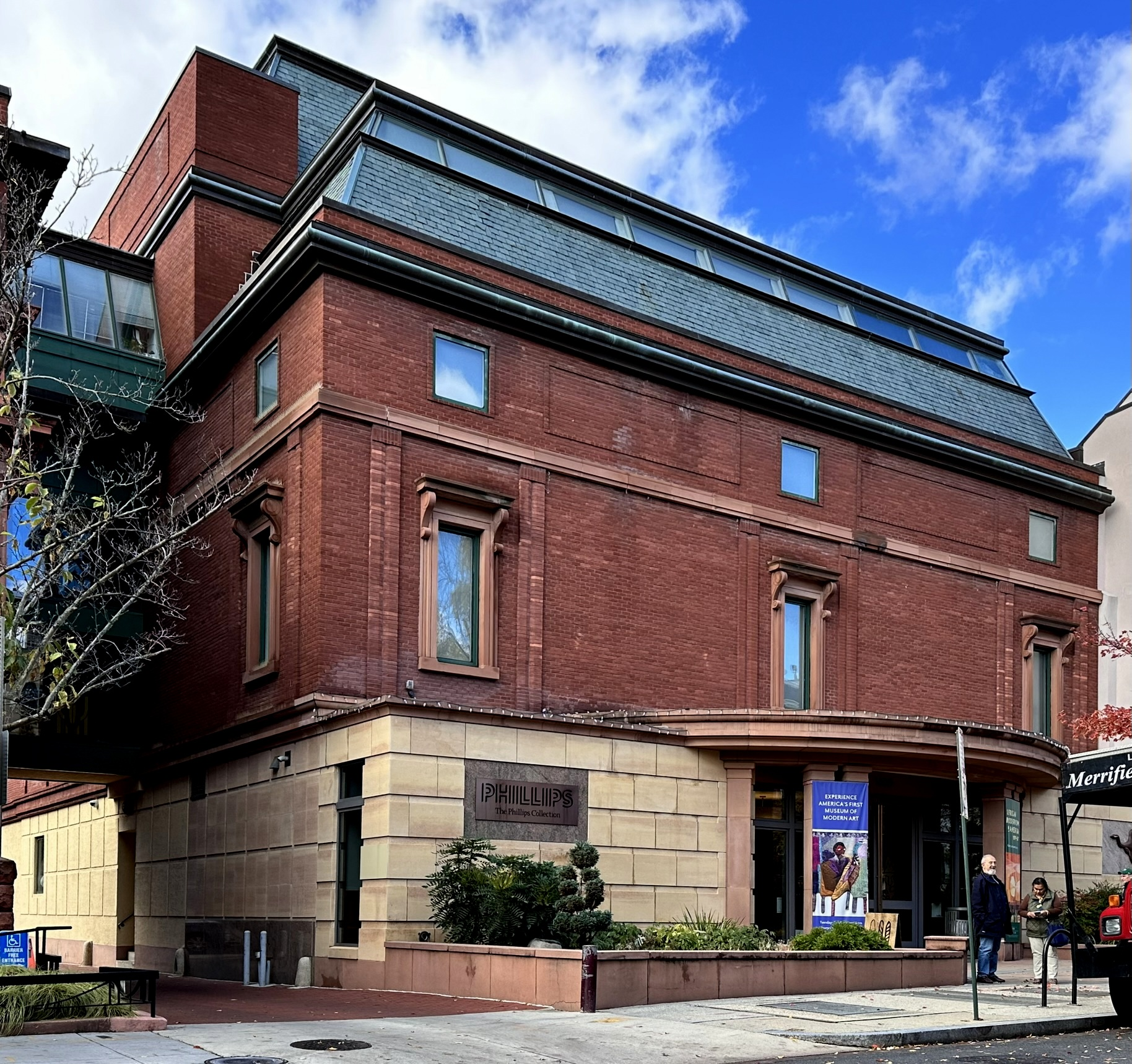
Goh Annex

The Phillips Collection is housed in a distinctive space in Washington's Dupont Circle neighborhood. From the beginning, Duncan Phillips exhibited his collection in special galleries at his home. A Georgian Revival house dating to 1897, listed on the National Register of Historic Places as the Duncan Phillips House, it now forms the southern section of the museum building; the north section of the collection is called the Goh Annex.

Over time, the building was adapted to include more galleries and offices, particularly after the Phillips family moved out in 1930. In 1960, Phillips added a modernist wing. This addition was renovated and reconceived in 1989 with the aid of a $1.5 million gift from Japanese businessman Yasuhiro Goh and his wife Mes. Hiroko Goh. The addition is known as the Goh Annex.

=== 2006 renovation and expansion project ===
To accommodate its ever-growing collection of art, audiences, and activities, the Phillips completed a major building project in April 2006. With 65 percent of the added 30,000 square feet (2,800 m^{2}) located below ground, the expansion preserves the intimate scale and residential quality that distinguishes The Phillips Collection and respects the character of the Dupont Circle neighborhood. The new spaces, known as the Sant Building, incorporate expanded galleries, among them the first to accommodate larger-scale post-1950s work; a 180-seat auditorium for lectures, films, and events; an outdoor courtyard; and a new shop and café. The architect for the new building was Arthur Cotton Moore. Two of the most notable elements of the new structure are the winding white interior staircase and the external sculptural stone relief of a bird relating to Georges Braque's painting Bird from the museum's collection.

=== The University of Maryland Center for Art and Knowledge at The Phillips Collection ===
The 2006 addition also made possible The Phillips Collection Center for the Study of Modern Art. This new museum-based educational model brought together scholars from across academic fields in an ongoing forum for discussion, research, and publishing on modern art. The two-story building, formerly the carriage house, is the site of programs and classes on modern and contemporary art and artists.

In 2015, the Phillips launched a partnership with The University of Maryland with a shared vision to transform scholarship and innovation in the arts. The Center was renamed The "University of Maryland Center for Art and Knowledge at The Phillips Collection", which is the expansion of the Center for the Study of Modern Art in the museum and the nexus for academic work, scholarly exchange, and innovative interdisciplinary collaborations.

Some of the key collaborations of the partnership include developing a new arts curriculum and extended studies courses, postdoctoral fellowships, a biennial book prize, and programming and events.

=== Café ===
Bread Furst is the current Café at the Phillips Collection. An artisanal bakery founded by Mark Furstenberg, it also serves wines, empanadas and other creations by Mark's team of chefs.

== Services ==
Phillips collections offers education services in collaboration with District of Columbia Public Schools and other institutions in the area, it also present many live programs in the main building both in the house and in the galleries section.

=== Education ===
Since the museum's early years, when art classes were held on the third floor of the house, significant attention has been given to educational outreach. Today, the museum features an active schedule of lectures, gallery talks, classes, parent/child workshops, and teacher training programs. It also reaches out to the community through initiatives such as Art Links to Literacy, combining programs for underserved students at District of Columbia Public Schools and their parents and caregivers with professional development for their teachers. These and other ventures are facilitated by new exhibition spaces for student art, an art activity room for hands-on education projects, and an art technology lab for developing interactive resources based on the museum's educational programs.

In 2015, the museum joined forces with the University of Maryland. The two institutions will work together to establish the University of Maryland Center for Art and Knowledge at the Phillips Collection.

=== Programs ===
Phillips After 5 combines live jazz, gallery talks, modern art, and a cash bar on the first Thursday of every month from 5 to 8:30 pm.

Sunday Concerts, founded in 1941, offer classical chamber music in the intimacy of the museum's oak-paneled Music Room. The concerts have featured ensembles and soloists ranging from Glenn Gould, Jessye Norman, Jean-Yves Thibaudet, Emanuel Ax, Damjana Bratuž, and Yeol Eum Son to some of the most talented young musicians performing today. Sunday Concerts are held from October through May. They begin promptly at 4 pm.

Live music is presented in the House, with local musician performances and sometimes visitor musicians from abroad. They are presented in many events, among them the yearly New Year Celebration, the Phillips Collection anniversary among other events.

Centennial music commission are creative dialogues between music and visual art, where composers respond to works in the collection. These audiovisual artworks free to reproduce on the Phillips collection website.

In December 2009, The Pink Line Project put together a multimedia evening called "Art Is _____." Visitors were invited to remix the definition of art, using Duncan Phillips's writings as source material. Guests could send text messages to a computer engineer who projected them onto a wall, creating a group art project.

In 2021, the museum hosted a juried invitational exhibition titled Inside Outside, Upside Down, which was described by The Washington City Paper as forcing "us to remember a time that left us 'confused, battered, and disoriented' through the eyes of 64 D.C.-area artists."

Artwalks are events hold in the museum the third Thursday of every month between 5 P.M. and 8 P.M. A curator or an invited guest walk with visitors through the gallery while talk about the life and work of the author or authors and give insights of history behind the art works exposed.

Meditation is a free wellness activity led by local yoga teacher Aparna Sadananda. This weekly meditation is a 30-minute program presented initially as an in person activity, after COVID-19 pandemic is presented online, it is a free access activity that is held through Zoom software, a free videoconference tool that can be installed in mobile phones, laptops and Smart TVs.. The activity itself promote wellness and help to cope with the stress promoted by the current culture values and with the challenges brought by COVID-19 itself.

360-Degree tours are virtual tours of the museum exhibitions and installations it includes full screen images, the describing text of the art work, and audio guides.

== Directors ==
When Duncan Phillips died in 1966, his wife Marjorie succeeded him as museum director. Their son, Laughlin, became director in 1972. He led The Phillips Collection through a multi-year program to ensure the physical and financial security of the collection, renovate and enlarge the museum buildings, expand and professionalize the staff, conduct research on the collection, and make the Phillips more accessible to the public. In 1992, Charles S. Moffett, a noted author and curator, was named director. Moffett was directly involved with the presentation of several ambitious exhibitions during his six-year tenure, including the memorable "Impressionists on the Seine: A Celebration of Renoir’s Luncheon of the Boating Party" in 1996.

Jay Gates became director in 1998. Under his leadership, The Phillips Collection continued to grow and broaden its presence in Washington, D.C., across the country, and internationally. Dorothy M. Kosinski, previously a curator at the Dallas Museum of Art, took over as director in May 2008. Kosinski became director emerita in 2023 as Jonathan Binstock, from the Memorial Art Gallery of the University of Rochester (NY), assumed the directorship.

=== List of directors ===
- Jonathan P. Binstock (2023-present)
- Dorothy M. Kosinski (2008–2023)
- Jay Gates (1998–2008)
- Charles Moffett (1992–1998)
- Laughlin Phillips (1972–1992), son of Duncan and Marjorie Phillips
- Marjorie Acker (1966–1972), artist and wife of Duncan Phillips
- Duncan Phillips (1921–1966), founder

== Selected highlights ==
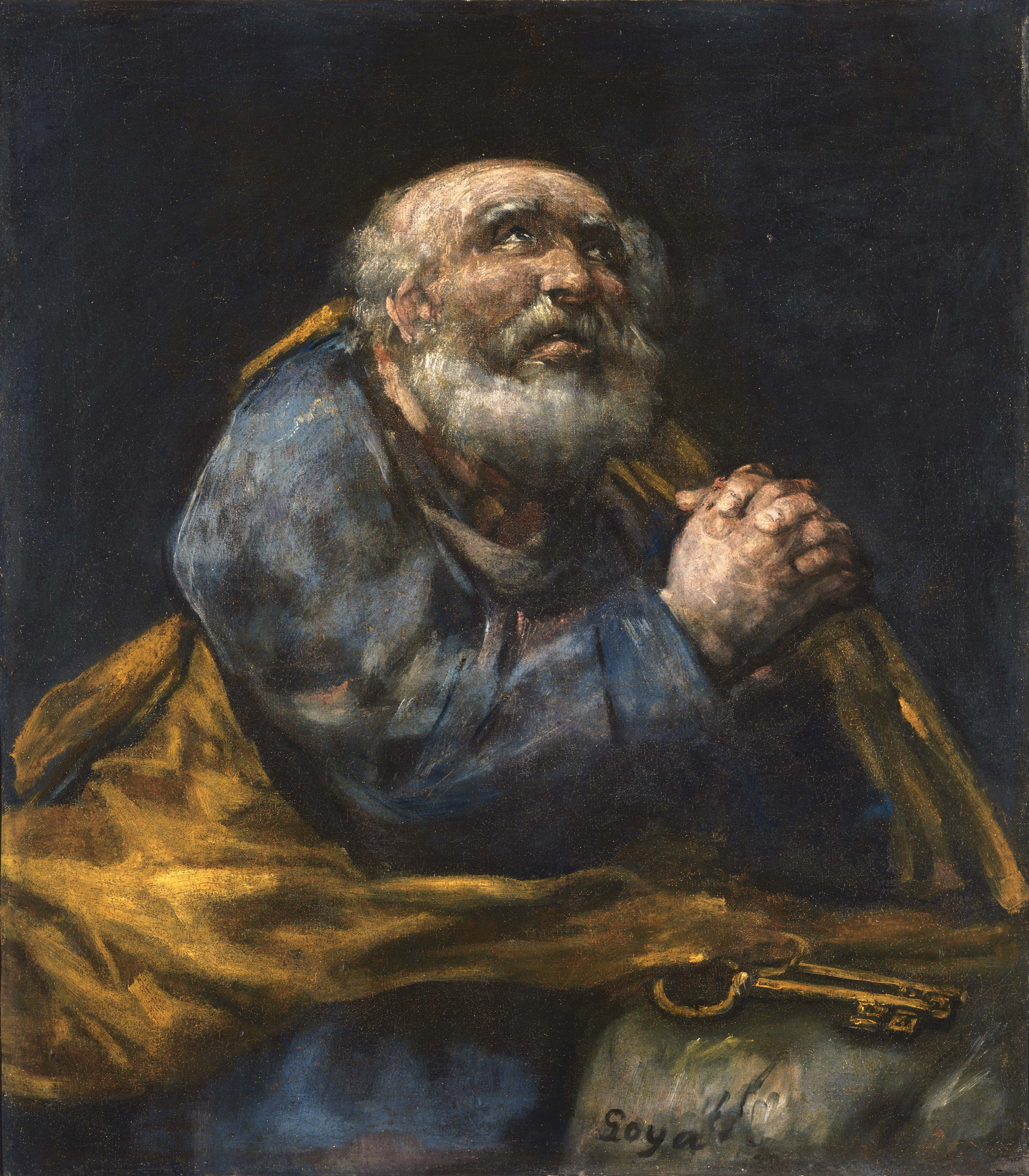
Francisco Goya, St. Peter Repentant, 1823-1825

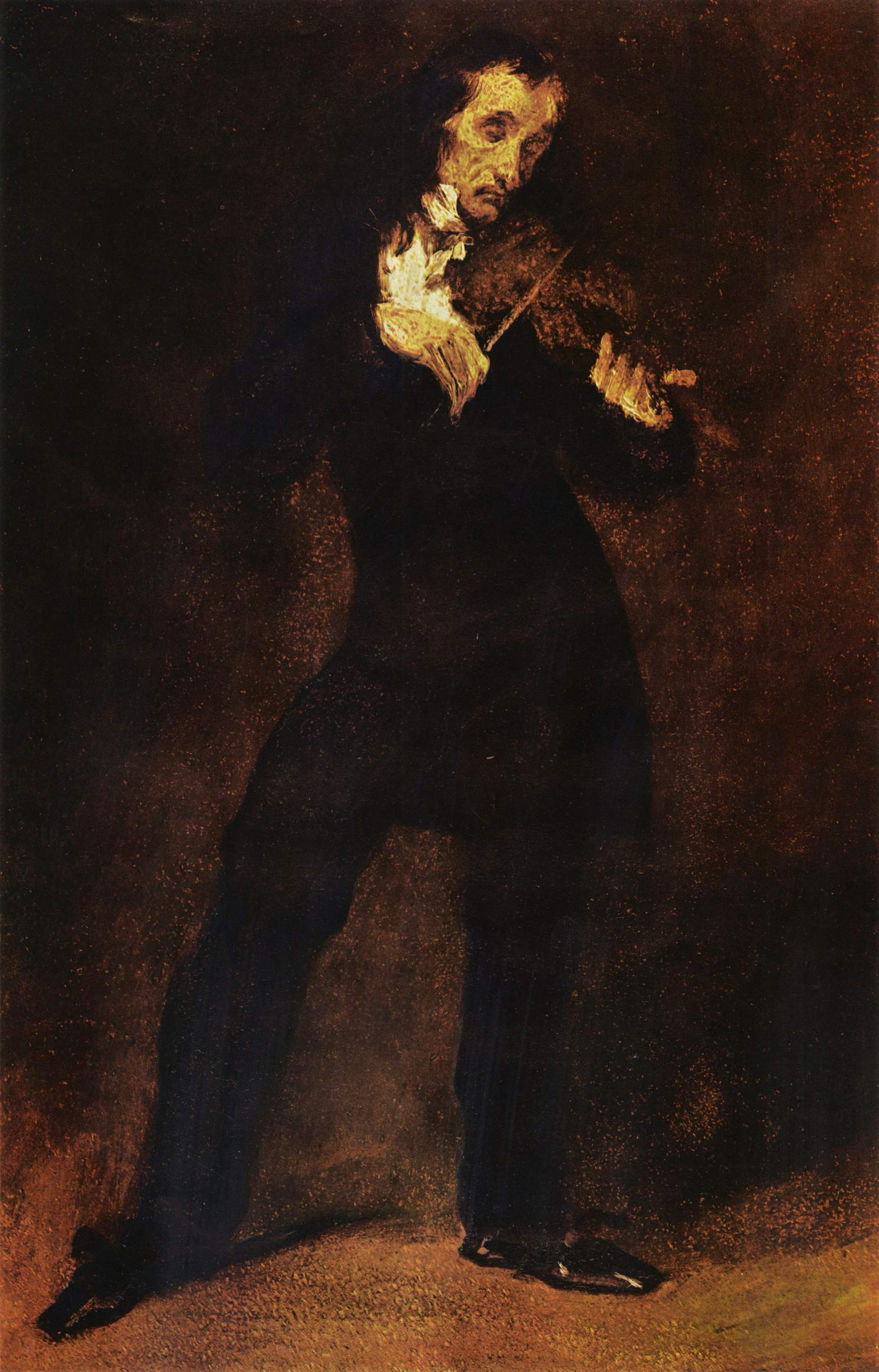
Eugène Delacroix, Portrait of Paganini, 1832

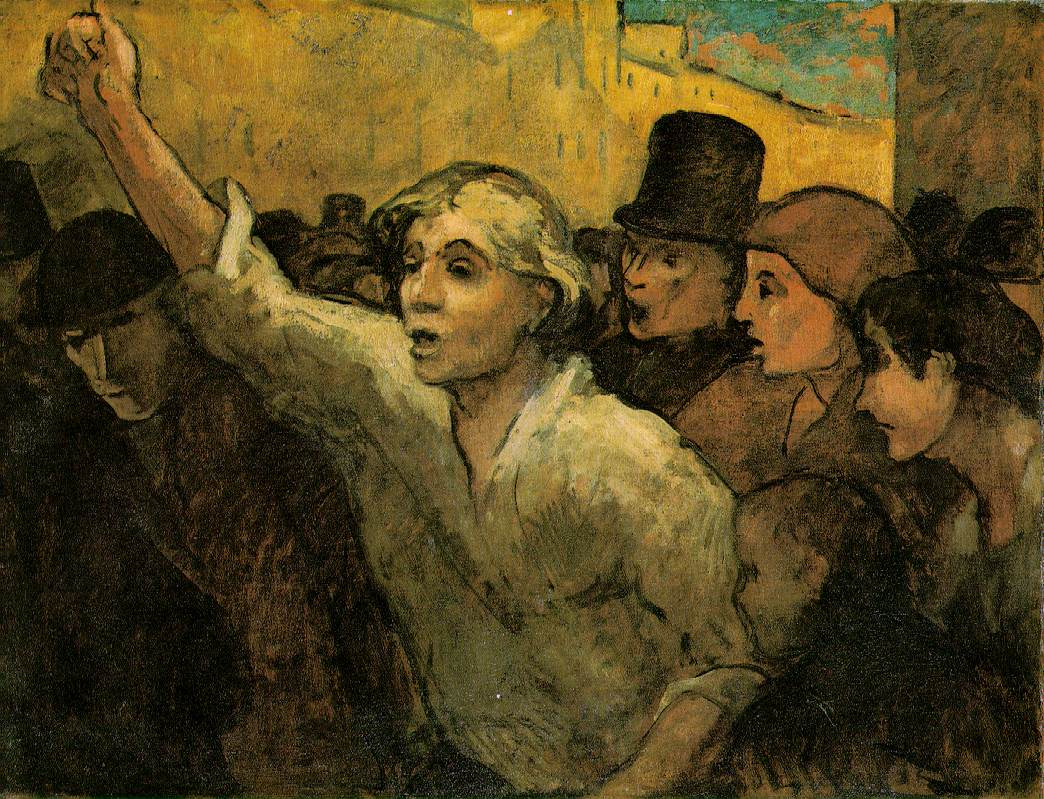
Honoré Daumier, The Uprising, 1848

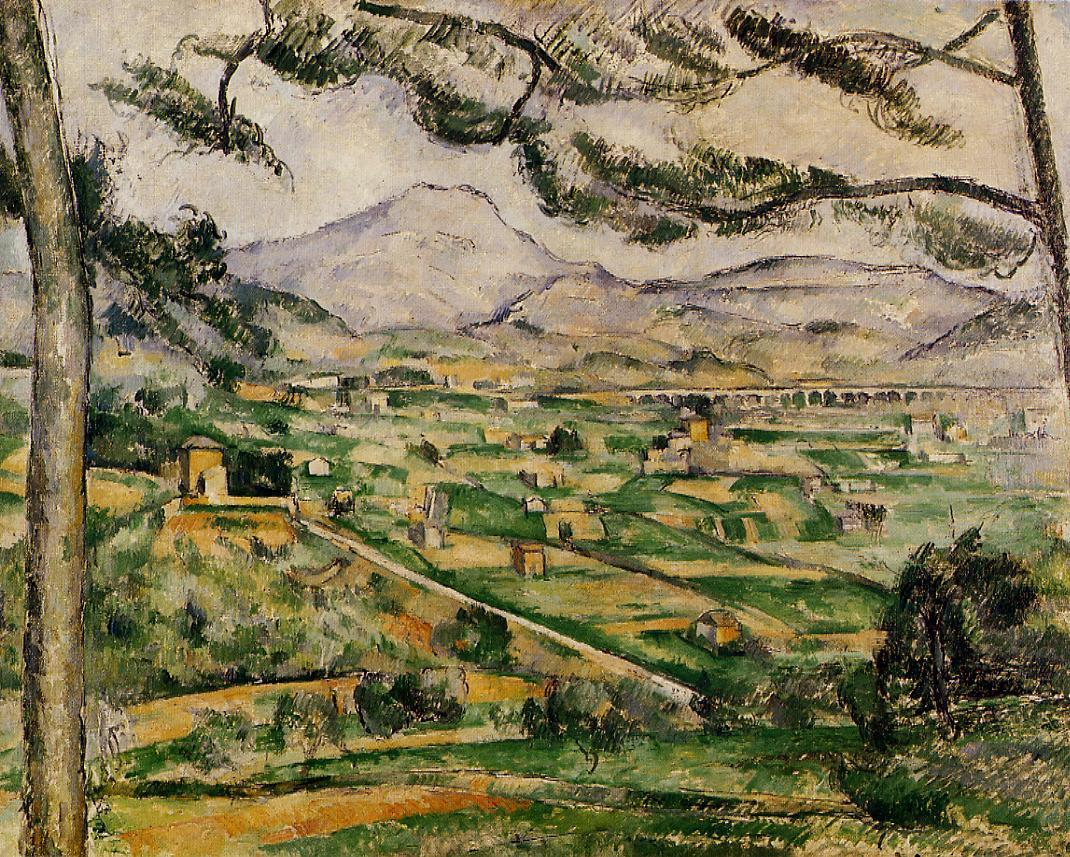
Paul Cézanne, Mont Sainte-Victoire with Large Pine, 1886-1887

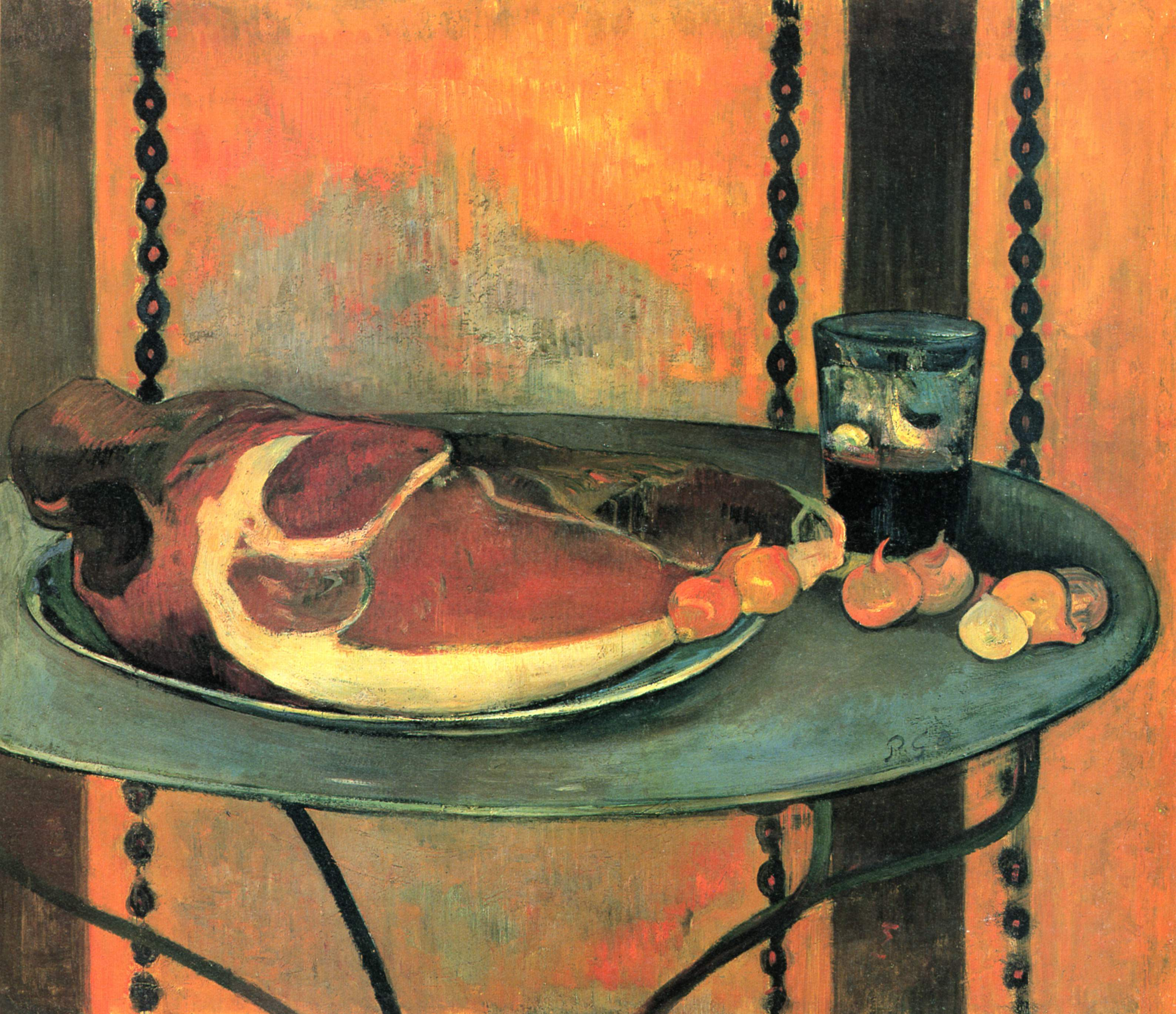
Paul Gauguin, The Ham, 1889

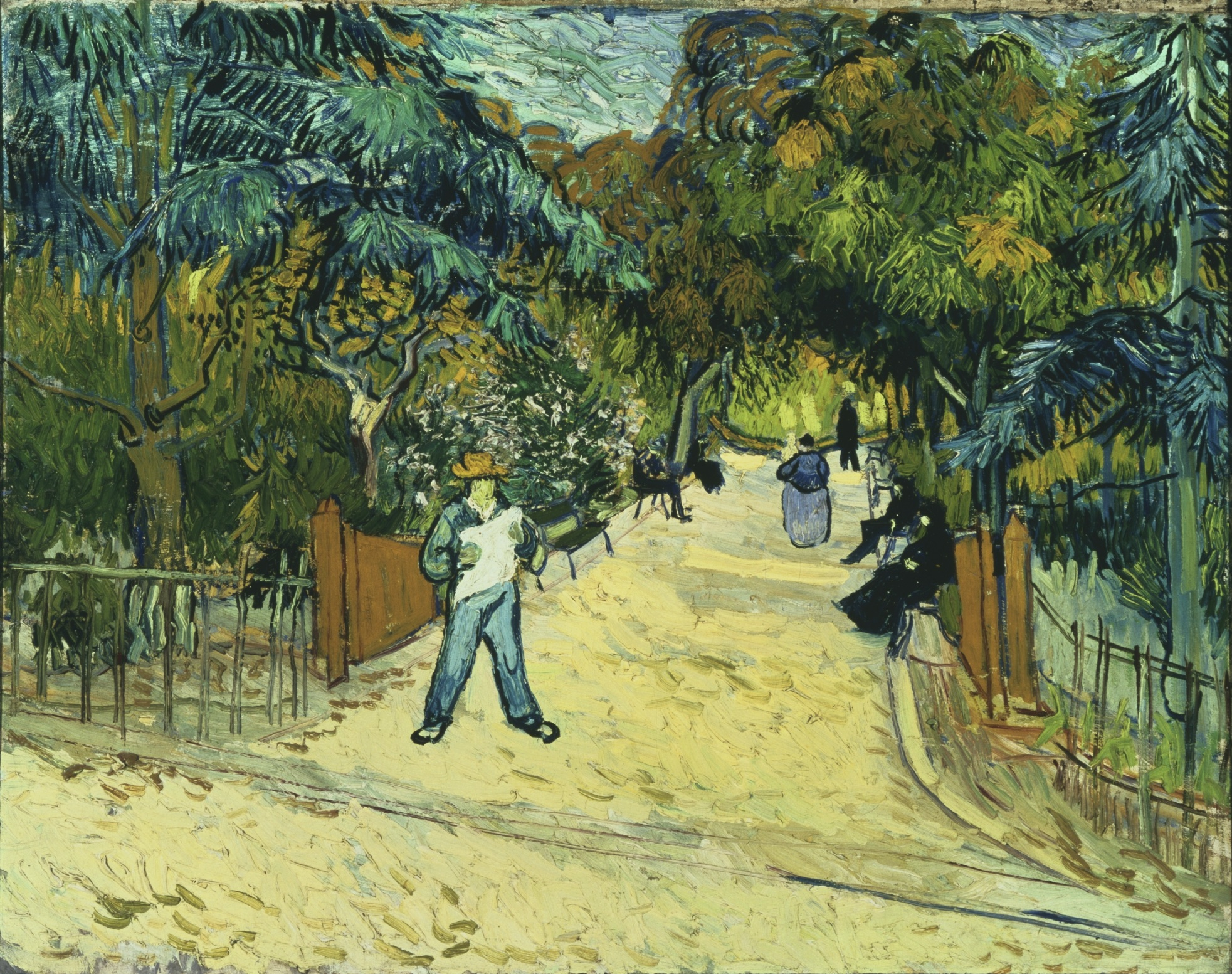
Vincent van Gogh, Entrance to the Public Park in Arles, 1888

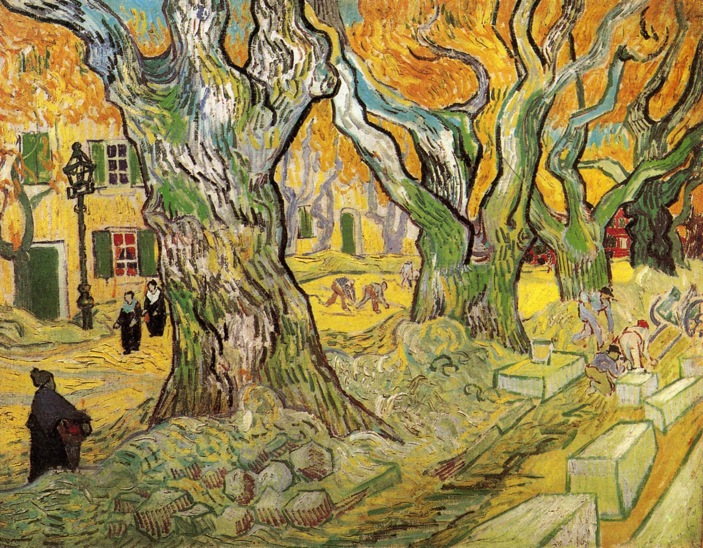
Vincent van Gogh, The Road Menders, 1889

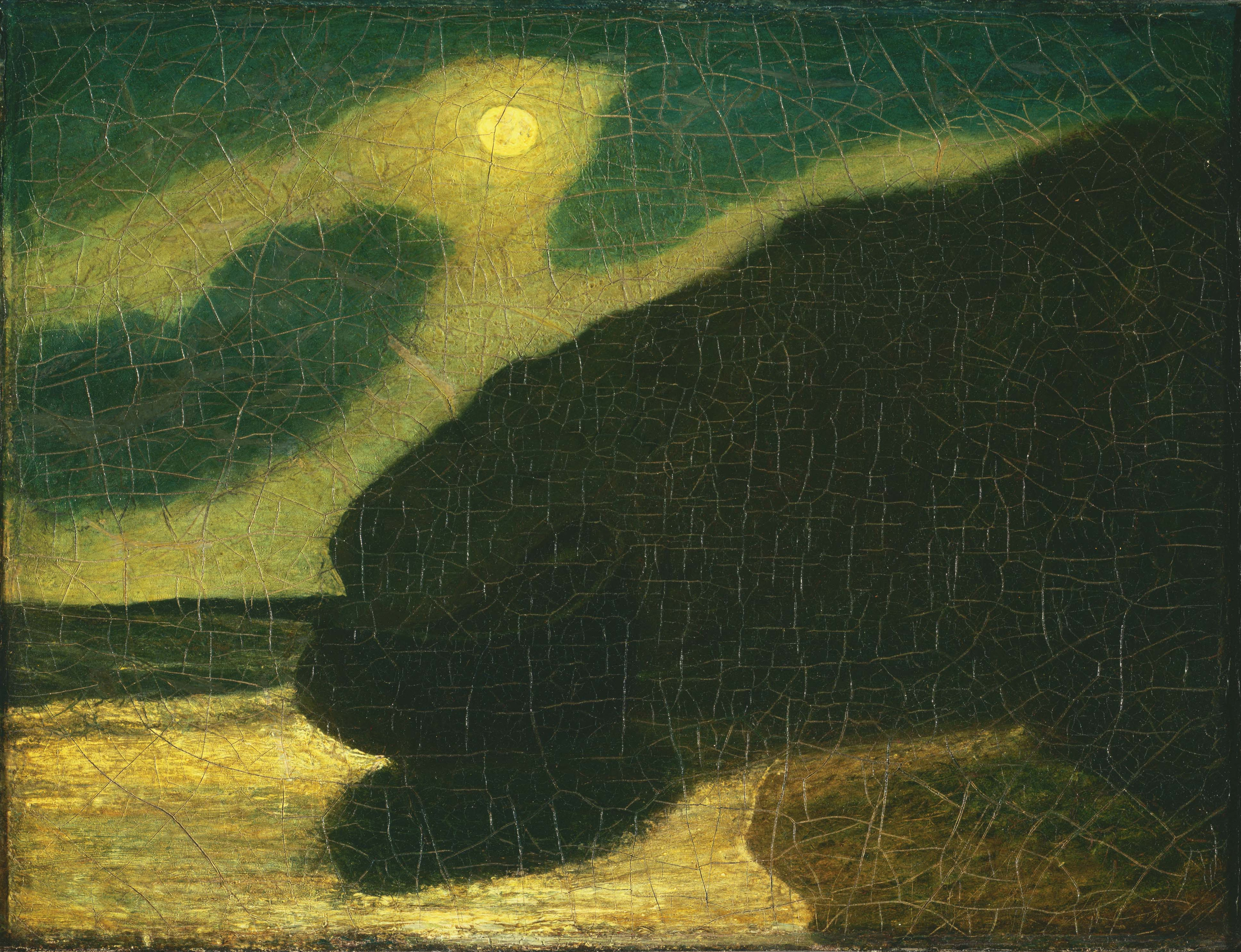
Albert Pinkham Ryder, Seacoast in Moonlight, 1890

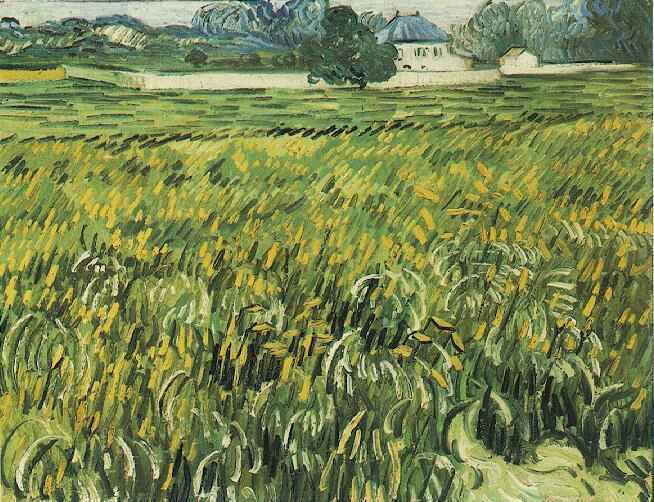
Vincent van Gogh, Wheat Field at Auvers with House, 1890

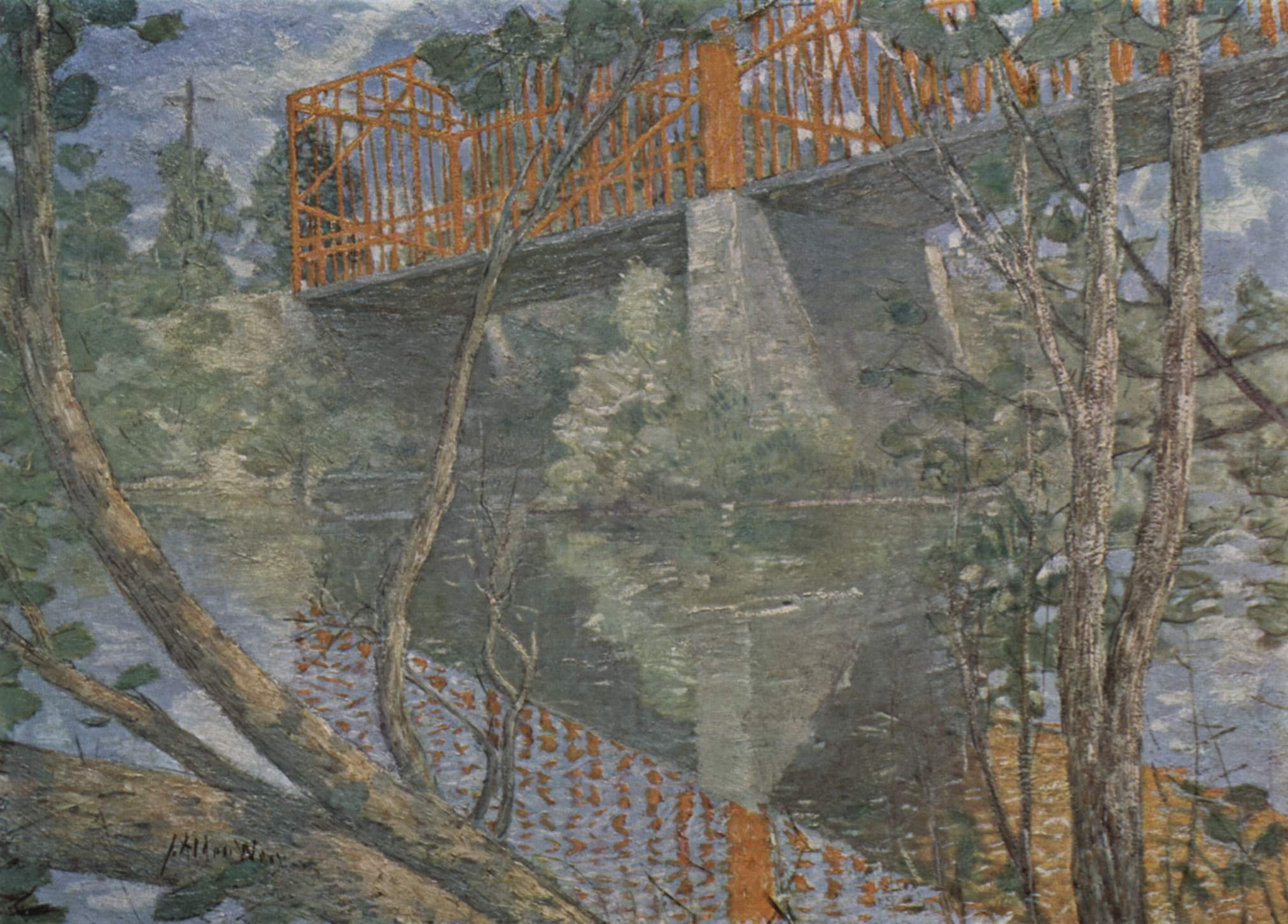
J. Alden Weir, The Red Bridge, 1895

Pablo Picasso, The Blue Room, 1900

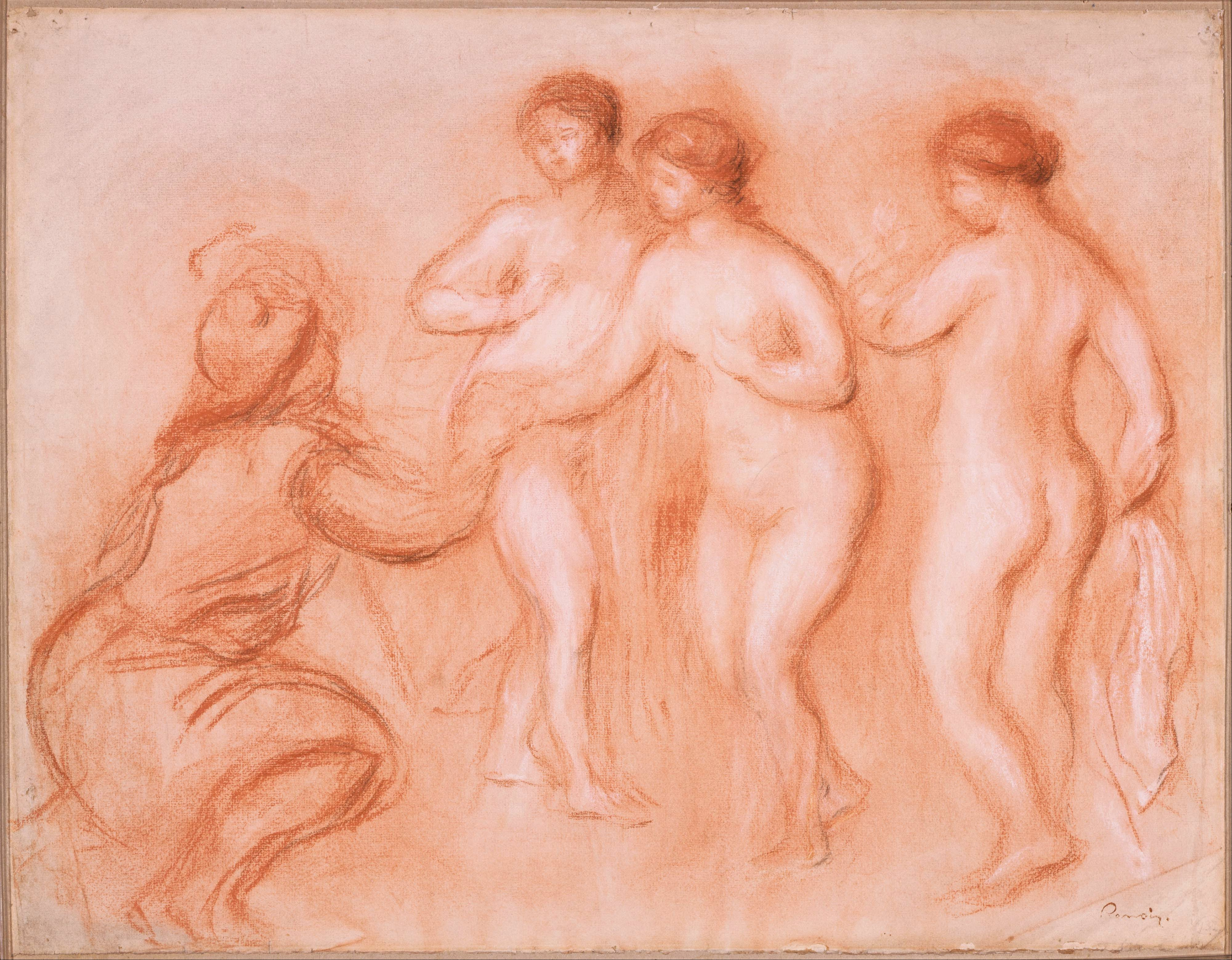
Pierre-Auguste Renoir, Judgment of Paris, 1908

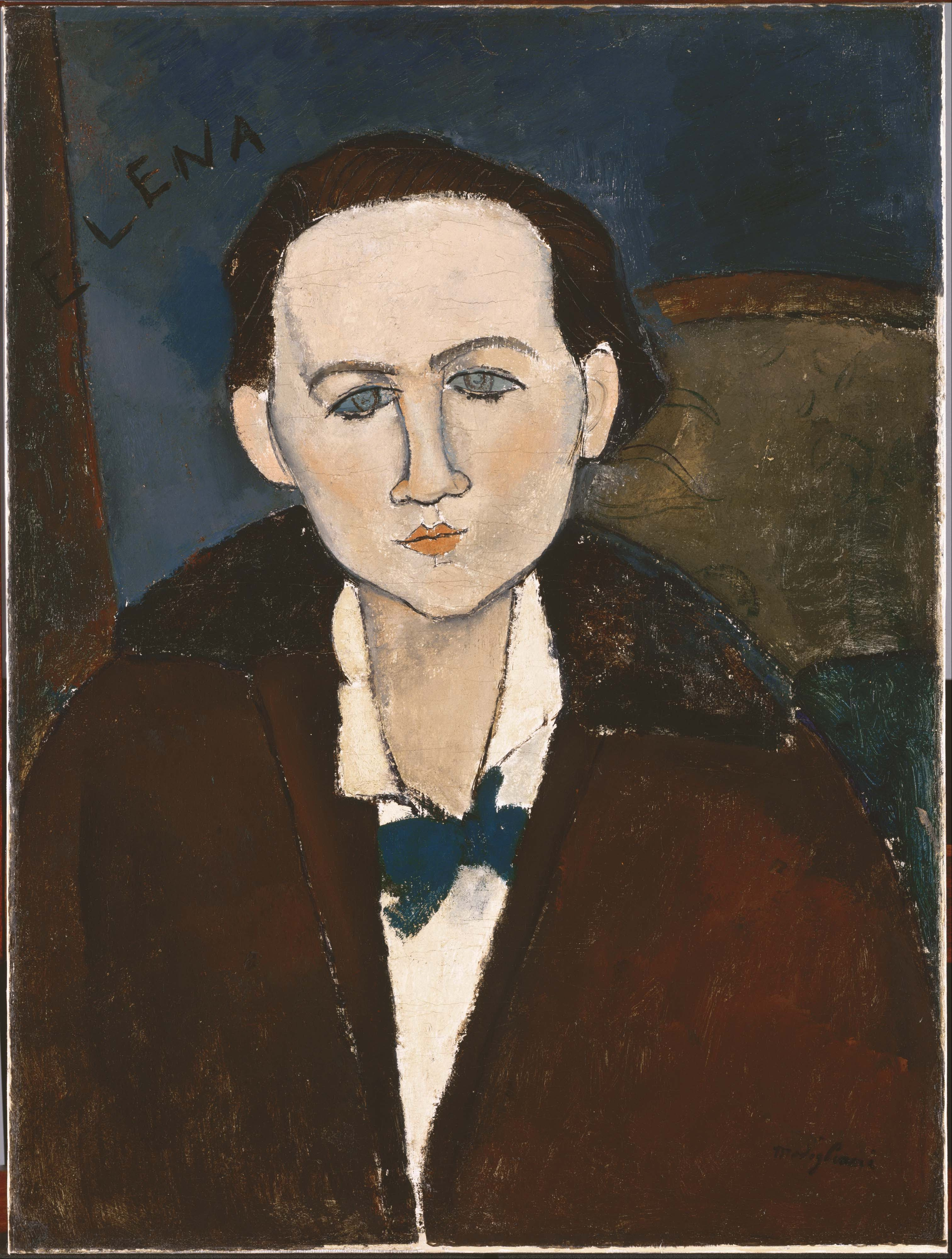
Amedeo Modigliani, Portrait of Elena Pavlowski, 1917

== See also ==
- List of museums in Washington, D.C.
