= James Hutchins =

James Hutchins may refer to:

- James Hutchins (Latter Day Saints) (c. 1810–1874), Church of Jesus Christ of Latter Day Saints (Strangite) apostle
- James H. Hutchins, New York politician
- James W. Hutchins (1929–1984), American murderer, executed in North Carolina

== See also ==
- Jamie Hutchings (born 1971), singer
- James Mason Hutchings (1820–1902), American businessman
- James Hutchins Johnson (1802–1887), U.S. Representative from New Hampshire
