= Duncan Phillips (art collector) =

American art collector (1886–1966)

- Born: June 26, 1886; Pittsburgh, Pennsylvania, United States
- Died: May 9, 1966 (aged 79); Washington, D.C., United States
- Occupations: Art collector; art critic
- Organization: The Phillips Collection
- Known for: Founder of The Phillips Collection
- Spouse: Marjorie Acker Phillips
- Children: Mary Marjorie Phillips, Laughlin Phillips
- Parents: Duncan Clinch Phillips (father); Elizabeth Irwin Laughlin (mother)

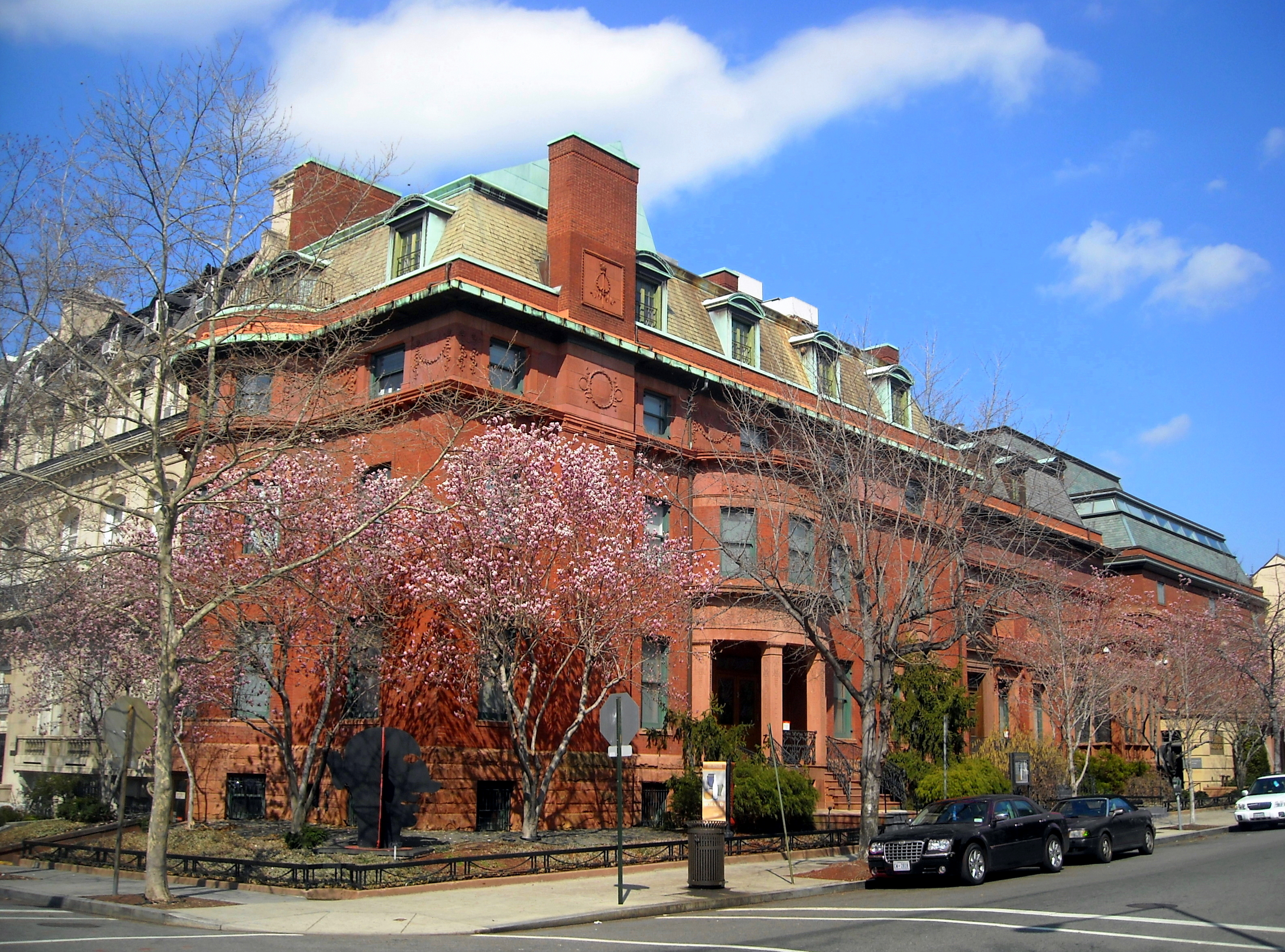
The Phillips Collection in Washington, D.C., houses nearly 3,000 works by American and European impressionist and modern artists, assembled principally by Duncan Phillips

Duncan Phillips (26 June 1886 – 9 May 1966) was an art collector and critic based in Washington, DC. He played a seminal role in introducing modern art to the United States, while stressing its continuities with past art.

== Early life ==
Phillips was born in Pittsburgh. When he was nine, his family moved to Washington, D.C. in 1895. He was a son of Elizabeth "Eliza" Irwin Laughlin (1844–1929), and Duncan Clinch Phillips (1838–1917), a Pittsburgh window glass millionaire. His father was a member of the South Fork Fishing and Hunting Club near Johnstown, Pennsylvania. His maternal grandfather was James Laughlin, a banker and industrialist, co-founder of the Jones and Laughlin Steel Company.

One of Duncan's siblings was a brother, James Laughlin Phillips, named after their grandfather.

== Art collector and critic ==
Phillips lost both his father in 1917, and brother James in 1918 from the Spanish influenza. Later that year, Phillips and his mother established The Phillips Memorial Gallery in their memory. It was the precursor of The Phillips Collection in Washington, DC.

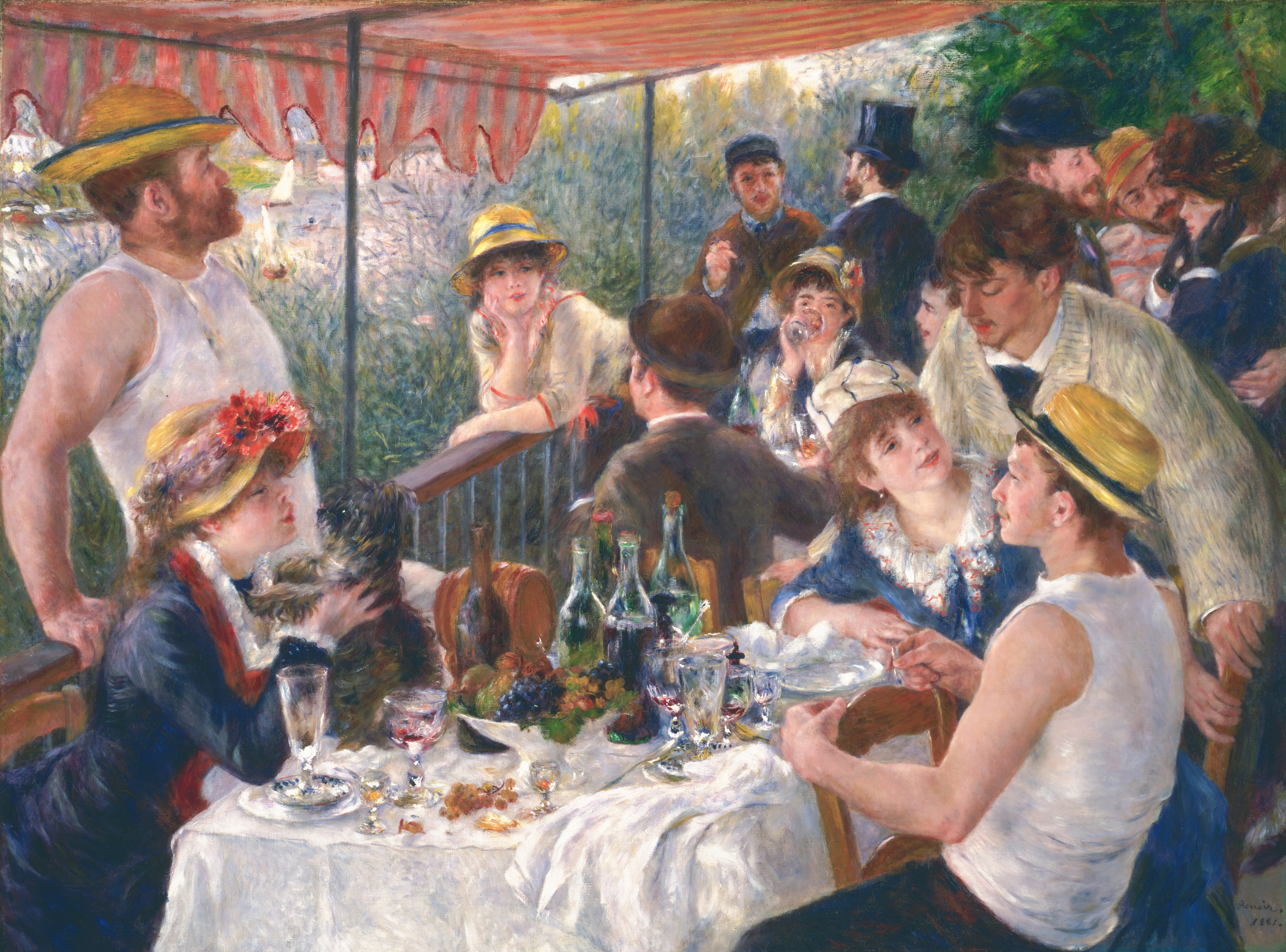
Pierre-Auguste Renoir, Luncheon of the Boating Party, 1881, oil on canvas, 130.2 × 175.6 cm, one of the highlights of the Phillips Collection.

Beginning with a small family collection of paintings, Phillips, a published art critic, expanded the collection dramatically. From the beginning Phillips conceived of his museum as "a memorial…a beneficent force in the community where I live—a joy-giving, life-enhancing influence, assisting people to see beautifully as true artists see."

In 1921, Phillips married painter Marjorie Acker. With her assistance and advice, he developed his collection "as a museum of modern art and its sources," believing strongly in the continuum of artists influencing their successors through the centuries. His focus on the continuous tradition of art was revolutionary at a time when many Americans were largely critical of modernism, which was seen as a break with the past. Phillips collected works by masters such as El Greco, calling him the "first impassioned expressionist"; Jean-Baptiste-Siméon Chardin because he was "the first modern painter"; Francisco Goya because he was "the stepping stone between the Old Masters and the Great Moderns like Cézanne"; and Édouard Manet, a "significant link in a chain which began with Goya and which [led] to Gauguin and Matisse."

From the 1920s to the 1960s, Phillips would re-hang his galleries in installations that were non-chronological and non-traditional. They reflected his view of relationships between various artistic expressions. He presented visual connections—between past and present, between classical form and romantic expression—as dialogues on the walls of the museum. Giving equal focus to American and European artists, Phillips juxtaposed works by Winslow Homer, Thomas Eakins, Maurice Prendergast, James Abbott McNeill Whistler, and Albert Pinkham Ryder with canvases by Pierre Bonnard, Peter Ilsted and Édouard Vuillard. He exhibited watercolors by John Marin with paintings by Cézanne, and works by van Gogh with El Greco’s The Repentant St. Peter (circa 1600–05).

Phillips’ vision brought together "congenial spirits among the artists," and his ideas still guide the museum today.

Augustus Vincent Tack, Time and Timelessness (The Spirit of Creation), 1943-1944, oil on canvas. Phillips was among the first to recognize Tack's paintings and ultimately acquired more than 40 of his works. (Phillips Collection)

Throughout his lifetime, Phillips had the prescience and courage to acquire paintings by many artists who were not fully recognized at the time, among them Marin, Georgia O'Keeffe, Arthur Dove, Nicolas de Staël, Milton Avery and Augustus Vincent Tack. By purchasing works by such promising but unknown artists, Phillips provided them with the means to continue painting. He formed close bonds with and subsidized several artists who are prominently featured in the collection—Dove and Marin in particular—and consistently purchased works by artists and students for what he called his "encouragement collection."

A memorable Duncan Phillips anecdote has him standing with Dr. Albert C. Barnes, before the Renoir masterpiece "Luncheon of the Boating Party". "That's the only Renoir you have, isn't it?" asked the fearsome Dr. Barnes, whose distinctive collection of Impressionist and post-Impressionist fine art contains scores of Renoirs. They are part of what is now known as the Barnes Foundation in Philadelphia. Phillips' reply was succinct: "It's the only one I need.”

== Personal life ==
In 1921, Phillips married painter Marjorie Acker, a daughter of engineer Charles Ernest Acker and his wife Alice Reynolds (née Beal Acker.

Together, they were the parents of:

- Mary Marjorie Phillips (1922–1995), who spent much of her life in institutions after having contracted encephalitis as a toddler.
- Laughlin Phillips (1924–2010). He married Elizabeth Hood, and they had two children before divorcing. He later married Jennifer Stats Cafritz. She was the former wife of Conrad Cafritz of the Washington real-estate family.

When Duncan Phillips died on 9 May 1966, Marjorie succeeded him as museum director.

Their son, Laughlin, became director in 1972. He led The Phillips Collection through a multi-year program to ensure the physical and financial security of the collection, renovate and enlarge the museum buildings, expand and professionalize the staff, conduct research on the collection, and make the Phillips more accessible to the public.

== See also ==
Johanna Meyer-Udewald
