= Hutchens =

Hutchens may refer to:

== Surname ==
- Cyril Hutchens, Australian politician
- Frank Hutchens (1892–1965), pianist and composer from New Zealand
- Giles Hutchens (before 1556–1624), English politician
- Harry Hutchens (1858–1939), American sprint runner
- Paul Hutchens (1902–1977), American author
- Sandra Hutchens, Sheriff-Coroner of Orange County, California, United States
- W. T. Hutchens (1859–1940), American politician; former mayor of Huntsville, Alabama

== Others ==
- Hutchens device, a device for protecting race car drivers in the event of an accident
- Hutchens v. Stout, a case before the North Carolina Court of Appeals in 1986
- The Hutchens, American country music trio

== See also ==
- Hutchins (disambiguation)
