= Augustus Vincent Tack =

American painter

- Time and Timelessness, (the Spirit of Creation), 1943-1944, oil on canvas, Phillips Collection Washington DC
- Born: November 9, 1870; Pittsburgh, Pennsylvania
- Died: 22 July 1949; Deerfield, Massachusetts
- Education: Art Students League of New York

Augustus Vincent Tack (1870–1949) was an American painter of portraits, landscapes and abstractions.

== Early years ==
Tack was born in Pittsburgh, Pennsylvania and moved with his family to New York in 1883. After graduating from St. Francis Xavier College in New York City in 1890, Tack studied at the Art Students League of New York until 1895. He is believed to have frequented the studio of painter and stained glass designer John La Farge, whose portrait he painted around 1900. He had his first solo exhibition at the Kraushaar Galleries in New York City in 1896. In 1897, he moved to an artists’ colony in Deerfield, Massachusetts, where he met and later married Agnes Gordon Fuller, daughter of artist George Fuller.

== Professional career ==
Tack maintained a studio in New York from 1894 until the end of his life. He had frequent exhibitions at New York City galleries. From 1900 until the 1920s, his work was shown regularly at the Worcester Art Museum, at the Carnegie International exhibitions in Pittsburgh, and the Pennsylvania Academy of the Fine Arts in Philadelphia. He taught at the Art Students League of New York between 1906 and 1910 and at Yale University from 1910 to 1913. During these teaching years, he also shared a studio with his friend, fellow artist Will Hutchins in Deerfield, Massachusetts. About 1914 to 1915 his work attracted the notice of Washington DC art collector and critic Duncan Phillips, who became his close friend and chief patron. Phillips and Tack also collaborated on the organization of the Allied War Salon of 1918. In 1925, the Nebraska Capitol Commission, following the recommendation of the late Bertram Grosvenor Goodhue, selected Tack to paint wall and ceiling murals for the Governor's Suite of the Nebraska State Capitol. Tack died in 1949 in New York City.

== Style ==
Tack's portraits and murals were traditional in style, but he also painted mystical semiabstract landscapes and abstract works on spiritual themes. These paintings, subjective and poetic explorations of nature that carried suggestions of timelessness and spirituality, were commercially unsuccessful. Time and Timelessness is an example, displaying Tack's style of contrasting the abstract qualities of his work with figurative aspects, in this case clouds. The painting is considered "a contemporary reworking of nineteenth-century heroic idealism".

Though Tack continued to paint conventional portraits and classically inspired murals for the remainder of his career, his most original achievements remain his semiabstract landscape paintings, many of which were inspired by photographs of the landscape of the American West. These were executed almost exclusively for Phillips. From 1941 on, Tack maintained a studio in Washington, DC., where he produced portraits of political and military leaders, including Eisenhower and Truman, while he continued to paint his poetic abstractions.

While Tack's abstractions in The Phillips Collection resemble the paintings of Clyfford Still and other better known Abstract expressionist painters they are largely unknown; he is considered an important if only a minor forerunner to American Abstract expressionism.

The Brooklyn Museum of Art, Harvard University Art Museums, the Honolulu Museum of Art, the Metropolitan Museum of Art, the National Gallery of Art, Washington DC, The Phillips Collection, Washington DC and the Telfair Museum of Art, (Georgia) are among the public collections holding works by Augustus Vincent Tack.

== Selected sources ==
- Art Students League of New York, Current catalogue, 2007. Art Students League of New York, former faculty.
- Green, Eleanor, Augustus Vincent Tack, 1870-1949: twenty-six paintings from the Phillips Collection, Augustus Vincent Tack; Phillips Collection; University of Texas at Austin, University Art Museum; University of Maryland, College Park, Art Gallery.
- Papanikolas, Theresa and DeSoto Brown, Art Deco Hawai'i, Honolulu, Honolulu Museum of Art, 2014, ISBN 978-0-937426-89-0, p. 129
