= Houchin (surname) =

Houchin is a surname. Notable people with the surname include:

- Charlie Houchin (born 1987), American swimmer
- Erin Houchin (born 1976), American politician

== See also ==
- Houchin
