= Hutchins, Georgia =

Unincorporated community in Georgia, U.S.

Coordinates: 33°50′30″N 83°10′05″W

Hutchins is an unincorporated community in Oglethorpe County, in the U.S. state of Georgia.

== History ==
Variant names were "Huching", "Huchings", and "Hutchings". A post office called Huching was established in 1892, and remained in operation until 1937. The community was named after one Captain Hutchins (or Huchins), a railroad conductor.
