= Will Hutchins (painter) =

20th-century American painter

- Born: 1878; Colchester, Connecticut
- Died: 1949 (aged 70–71)
- Known for: Painting

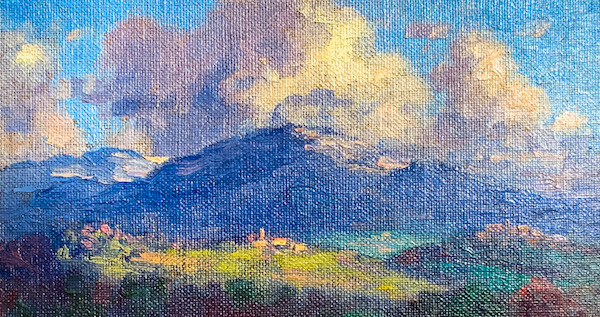
Rome (Gennanzano) painting by Will Hutchins (1919)

Will Hutchins (1878 – 1949) was an American painter and writer, known for his post-impressionistic landscapes. His work has been exhibited in multiple institutions including the Pennsylvania Academy of the Fine Arts, the Boston Art Club, the Corcoran Gallery of Art, Christie's, and the Washington County Museum, which held a retrospective of his work in 1962.

== Biography ==
Hutchins was born in 1878, Colchester, Ct., the only child of Charlotte Ann Hills and Rev. William T. Hutchins. Hutchins earned his BA at Yale University in 1901 and the BFA in 1909 and studied under Jean Paul Laurens at the Académie Julian in Paris.

Hutchins painted en plein air, taking in views and painting them on location. In 1918, Hutchins went to Italy to teach at the University of Bologna. Over the next two years, he ventured across the Italian countryside and made numerous paintings of the Italian landscapes he discovered. Upon returning to the United States in 1920, Hutchins painted on location across the East Coast.

== Role as art detective ==
Along with his friend and fellow-artist Augustus Vincent Tack, Hutchins was called on to determine whether a painting known as the Vernon Mona Lisa was actually a work created by Leonardo da Vinci or a copy. In a letter published in The New York Times on December 11, 1913, Hutchins declared that the Louvre original and Vernon copy were “noticeably dissimilar” in “subtlety,” “workmanship,” and “style.” Most recently, in 1995, that same painting sold at Sotheby's New York for $552,500.
