= James Hutchins (Latter Day Saints) =

Member of the Quorum of Twelve Apostles of the Church of Jesus Christ of Latter Day Saints (Strangite)
- Called by: James Strang

Personal details
- Born: c. 1810; Mississippi
- Died: 1874
- Spouse(s): Susannah (Susan) Beavers
- Parents: Jesse Hutchins; Mary Hutchins (née French)

James Hutchins (c. 1810 - 1874) was an American early Latter-Day Saint leader. He was a member of Quorum of Twelve Apostles of the Church of Jesus Christ of Latter Day Saints (Strangite). He was the first Strangite missionary sent to Utah, which happened in August 1870. Before following the Strangite sect, he was a member of the Quorum of the Seventy for the Church of Jesus Christ of Latter-day Saints.

== Biography ==
Hutchins was born c. 1810 in Tennessee and raised in Southwestern Mississippi. He was the son of Jesse Hutchins and Mary Hutchins (née French). On January 4, 1835, he married Susannah (Susan) Beavers in Mississippi, the daughter of Frederick Beavers and Sarah Cade.

In 1843, Hutchins was baptized in The Church of Jesus Christ of Latter-Day Saints and traveled to Nauvoo, Illinois. On April 10, 1843, he went on a mission for the church to Natchez, Mississippi. After returning to Nauvoo after his mission, Brigham Young led members of the church to Utah. Hutchins followed the group as far as Council Bluffs, Iowa, then resided there a number of years. After the Church succession crisis of 1844, he moved to Beaver Island, then the center for the Strangites, to follow James Strang. After the Strangites were disbursed from the island, he settled in Wisconsin along with other members of the congregation. While in Wisconsin, he was listed on the Manchester, Wisconsin Strangite Church rolls in 1873.

Hutchins died in 1874.

== Works ==
Hutchins wrote An Outline Sketch of the Travels of James Hutchins.
