= Michael Hutchings (chef) =

American chef (born 1949)

- Born: 1949 (age 76–77)
- Occupation: Chef
- Spouse: Christine Dahl

Michael Hutchings (born 1949) is a professional chef who is best known as the chef/owner of Michael's Waterside in Santa Barbara, California. He appears with Julia Child on the PBS cooking program Dinner at Julia's and on Cox Television with Jeanne Berg's Cooking Local program. Since 2015, he has appeared as the Chef Host of the Santa Barbara ABC-Affiliate cooking program The Inn Crowd.

== Biography ==
Michael Hutchings first worked at a restaurant in college. His first major job was in the kitchen of the private Club 33 at Disneyland. Michael Hutchings eventually became executive chef of Club 33, and afterwards worked under several Los Angeles chefs, including James Sly and Jean Grodin. He then opened Michael's Waterside in Santa Barbara. He sold Michael's Waterside in 1993, and worked at other restaurants for some time. Chef Michael currently oversees a food consulting and service business in Santa Barbara.
