= The Hutchens =

American country music group

- Origin: Sandy Ridge, North Carolina
- Genres: Country
- Years active: 1994–1996
- Labels: Atlantic
- Past members: Barry Hurtchens; Bill Hutchens; Bryan Hutchens

The Hutchens was an American country music trio from Sandy Ridge, North Carolina composed of brothers Barry, Bill and Bryan Hutchens. They were signed to Atlantic Records and released their debut album, Knock, Knock, in 1995. Stephen Thomas Erlewine of Allmusic gave the album three stars out of five, writing that it "showcases their laid-back country-rock to a fine effect."

Its lead single, the title track, peaked at number 56 on the Billboard Hot Country Singles & Tracks chart. It received a favorable review from Deborah Evans Price of Billboard, who said that it features "high-energy production, lots of personality in the vocal delivery, and [a] catchy chorus."

== Knock, Knock ==
Knock, Knock

Studio album by The Hutchens
- Released: November 1995
- Genre: Country
- Length: 30:00
- Label: Atlantic Records
- Producer: James Stroud

Singles from Knock, Knock
- 1. "Knock, Knock" Released: September 1995; 2. "Wait a Minute" Released: January 1996

=== Track listing ===
1. "Knock, Knock" (Jeff Stevens, Jerry Salley) – 2:09
2. "She Just Wants to Dance" (Bob Regan, Calvin Davidson) – 3:14
3. "Fear of a Broken Heart" (Billy Spencer, Paul Jefferson, Steve McClintock) – 2:51
4. "Your One And Only" (Even Stevens, Hillary Kanter) – 2:44
5. "Billy's Dream" (Jess Brown) – 3:56
6. "Wait a Minute" (Herb Pedersen) – 3:07
7. "Even Fools Get Lucky Sometimes" (Curtis Wright, Robert Ellis Orrall) – 3:38
8. "The Train Don't Stop Here Anymore" (John Scott Sherrill, Michael Henderson) – 2:31
9. "I'd Know" (Victoria Shaw, Salley) – 3:11
10. "I Like Simple Things" (Keith Stegall, Roger Murrah, J. Stevens) – 2:39

== Chart performance ==
Year	Single	Peak positions	Album
Year	Single	US Country	Album
1995	"Knock, Knock"	56	Knock, Knock
1996	"Wait a Minute"	—	Knock, Knock

=== Music videos ===
Year	Video
1995	"Knock, Knock"
1996	"Wait a Minute"
