= Jack Hutchings =

New Zealand cricketer

Personal information
- Full name: John Henry Hutchings
- Born: 22 December 1882; Wellington, New Zealand
- Died: 6 May 1966 (aged 83); Wellington
- Batting: Right-handed
- Bowling: Slow

Domestic team information
- Years: Team
- 1903/04–1924/25: Wellington

Career statistics
Competition	First-class
Matches	18
Runs scored	472
Batting average	18.15
100s/50s	0/1
Top score	74*
Balls bowled	1,126
Wickets	19
Bowling average	41.68
5 wickets in innings	0
10 wickets in match	0
Best bowling	4/102
Catches/stumpings	2/–
- Source: Cricinfo, 10 February 2019

John Henry Hutchings (22 December 1882 – 6 May 1966) was a cricketer who played first-class cricket for Wellington from 1903 to 1925.

Jack Hutchings played an important role in Wellington's first victory in the Plunket Shield, which gained them the title in 1918–19. Needing 225 to defeat Canterbury, Wellington were 188 for 8 when Hutchings went in to join Stan Brice. Together they added the required runs, giving Wellington a narrow victory. He made his highest score of 74 not out later that season in similar circumstances, except this time Wellington lost. They needed 257 to beat Auckland and were 55 for 6 when he went to the wicket. With help from the tail-enders he took the score to 197 all out. He finished the 1918–19 season in second place in the national batting averages with 172 runs at an average of 57.33.

Apart from a few years in Auckland, when he played no first-class cricket, Hutchings spent most of his life in Wellington. His wife Grace died at their home in Wellington in October 1923. They had one son, also known as Jack, who married Dorothy Mason, daughter of the politician Rex Mason. Hutchings died in Wellington in May 1966, aged 83.
