= Icarus affair =

1867 international incident

The Icarus affair (イカルス号事件, Ikarusu-gō jiken) was an incident involving the murder of two Royal Navy sailors in Nagasaki, Japan, in 1867, leading to increased diplomatic tensions between the United Kingdom and the Bakumatsu period Tokugawa shogunate.

On 5 August Robert Ford and John Hutchings, from the British screw sloop HMS Icarus, were killed by an unknown swordsman in the Marayuma entertainment precinct of Nagasaki, which had been opened to trade and port calls by British ships since the Anglo-Japanese Treaty of Amity and Commerce of 1858. The men, both aged 23, had been drinking, and were sleeping near the entrance to a "tea house". The British Consul in Nagasaki, Marcus Flowers, blamed the Tokugawa shogunate for failing to protect the men and believed that the Kaientai led by Sakamoto Ryōma was behind the killings. This belief was based on rumours that the men had been seen in the area, combined with the departure of Tosa steamers Yokobue and Wakamurasaki from Nagasaki soon after the incident.

Shōgun Tokugawa Yoshinobu was pressured by Sir Harry Parkes, head of the British Legation in Edo, to find the culprit. The shogunate was not disposed to dispute the evidence, since it conveniently weakened a feudal domain whose loyalty was increasingly uncertain. An agreement was reached that the governor of Nagasaki would be dismissed and 500 men would be sent to police the foreign quarter. Subsequently, Parkes sailed to Tosa aboard HMS Basilisk, arriving in Kōchi on 3 September 1867. There he was met by shogunate commissioners who had arrived earlier, to demand reparations from Tosa daimyō, Yamauchi Yōdō. Tosa official Gotō Shōjirō led negotiations on the Japanese side, and after several days it was evident that the British lacked sufficient evidence to convict the Kaientai. It was decided to reconvene the investigations in Nagasaki, where more evidence was presumably available, and Parkes's assistant Ernest Satow was delegated to accompany the Tosa delegation (which included Sakamoto Ryōma) back to Nagasaki on 9 September. Once back at Nagasaki, the charges against the Kaientai were dropped on 4 October.

It was revealed one year later that a samurai of the Fukuoka Domain had murdered the men, and shortly after committed ritual suicide. The Fukuoka clan subsequently paid compensation to the sailors' families in England.

The affair diminished British trust and confidence in the shogunate and their control over Kyūshū, one of many factors leading to British support of the Satchō Alliance during the Boshin War of the Meiji Restoration the following year.

== See also ==
- Anglo-Japanese relations
