= Cambria Heights School District =

School district in Pennsylvania

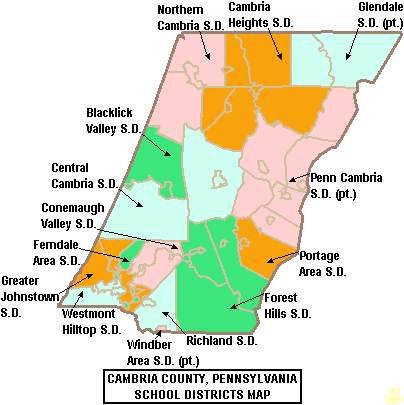

Address
- 426 Glendale Lake Road Patton, Cambria County, Pennsylvania, 16668; United States

District information
- Type: Public

Students and staff
- District mascot: Highlander
- Colors: Columbia blue and scarlet

Other information
- Website: www.chsd1.org

The Cambria Heights School District covers the Boroughs of Carrolltown, Chest Springs, Hastings and Patton as well as Chest Township, Clearfield Township, East Carroll Township, Elder Township and West Carroll Township in Cambria County, Pennsylvania. The district encompasses approximately 110 square miles (280 km^{2}). According to 2010 US Census Bureau data, it serves a resident population of 9,884 people. According to 2000 federal census data, it served a resident population of 7,120. According to 2007 local census data, it served a resident population of 10,299. The educational attainment levels for the Cambria Heights School District population (25 years old and over) were 90% high school graduates and 12% college graduates. The district is one of the 500 public school districts of Pennsylvania.

According to the Pennsylvania Budget and Policy Center, 36.3% of the district's pupils lived at 185% or below the Federal Poverty level as shown by their eligibility for the federal free or reduced price school meal programs in 2012. In 2010, the district residents’ per capita income was $19,545, while the median family income was $39,787. In the Commonwealth, the median family income was $49,501 and the United States median family income was $49,445, in 2010. In Cambria County, the median household income was $39,574. By 2013, the median household income in the United States rose to $52,100.

== Schools ==
There are three schools within the district. Cambria Heights Elementary School is located in Carrolltown Boro and consists of district students in Grades K-5. The Cambria Heights Middle School and Cambria Heights High School is located just off State Route 36 in Clearfield Township. The middle school consists of district students in Grades 6–8. Cambria Heights High School grades 9–12. All three schools were renovated at the beginning of the 21st century.

High school students may choose to attend Admiral Peary Vocational-Technical School for training in the construction and mechanical trades. The district also offers a cyber school to high school aged students called Cambria Heights Cyber Academy. Graduates of the cyber academy receive a Cambria Heights School District diploma. They have access to all the districts extracurriculars and programs. The Appalachia Intermediate Unit IU8 provides the district with a wide variety of services like specialized education for disabled students and hearing, speech and visual disability services and professional development for staff and faculty.

== Extracurriculars ==
Cambria Heights School District offers a wide variety of clubs, activities and an extensive, publicly funded sports program.

=== Sports ===
The following athletics are offered at Cambria Heights:

Varsity Boys athletics

- Baseball – Class AA
- Basketball - Class AA
- Cross Country – Class A
- Football - Class A
- Soccer - Class A
- Swimming and Diving – Class AA
- Track and Field – Class AA
- Wrestling – Class AA

Girls athletics

- Basketball – Class AA
- Cross Country – Class A
- Soccer – Class A
- Softball – Class AA
- Swimming and Diving – Class AA
- Track and Field – Class AA
- Volleyball – Class AA

Middle School Sports

Boys

- Basketball
- Cross Country
- Football
- Soccer
- Track and Field
- Wrestling

Girls

- Basketball
- Cross Country
- Softball (Fall)
- Track and Field
- Volleyball

According to PIAA directory July 2015
