= Chest (disambiguation) =

The chest is a part of the anatomy of humans and various other animals located between the neck and the abdomen.

Chest also commonly refers to:

- Chest (furniture), a piece of furniture used for storage

Chest may also refer to:

== Places ==
- Chest Creek, a tributary of the West Branch Susquehanna River in Pennsylvania, United States
- Chest Township, Cambria County, Pennsylvania
- Chest Township, Clearfield County, Pennsylvania

== Arts, entertainment, and media ==
- Chest (album)
- Chest (journal), a medical journal covering chest diseases and related issues
- The Chest, an episode of Comedy Premieres
- "Chest", a 2025 song by 5 Seconds of Summer from Everyone's a Star!

== Furniture and storage ==
- Chest of drawers, also called (especially in North American English) a bureau, a type of cabinet (a piece of furniture) that has multiple parallel, horizontal drawers usually stacked one above another

== Other uses ==
- Chest (mechanical engineering)
- Windchest of a pipe organ
- CHEST (UK Higher Education) Combined Higher Education Software Team
- American College of Chest Physicians (CHEST)

== See also ==
- Hope chest (disambiguation)
