= Cambria Heights High School =

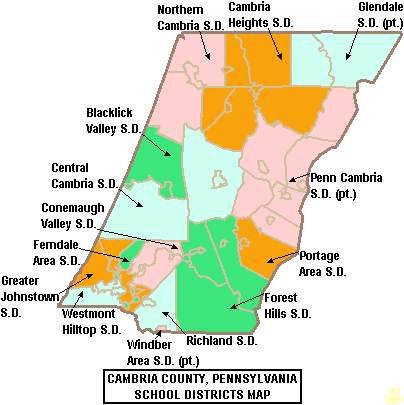

Location
- 426 Glendale Lake Road; Patton, Pennsylvania 16668; United States; 40.6338°N 78.6292°W

Information
- Type: Public
- School district: Cambria Heights School District
- Principal: Kenneth Kerchenske
- Faculty: 34 (2014) Average salary $52,045 33.5 teachers 2012
- Teaching staff: 34.50 (FTE)
- Grades: 9th–12th
- Enrollment: 435 (2023–2024)
- Student to teacher ratio: 12.61
- Language: English
- Colors: Columbia Blue and Scarlet
- Mascot: Highlander
- Website: http://www.chsd1.org

Cambria Heights High School is located at 426 Glendale Lake Road in Patton, Cambria County, Pennsylvania, United States. It is the sole high school operated by the Cambria Heights School District. In 2014, Cambria Heights High School enrollment was reported as 454 pupils in 9th through 12th grades. Cambria Heights High School employed 34 teachers. Cambria Heights High School students may choose to attend Admiral Peary Vocational-Technical School for training in the construction and mechanical trades, as well as other careers.

Cambria Heights High School serves the communities of: Carrolltown, Chest Springs, Hastings and Patton as well as Chest Township, Clearfield Township, East Carroll Township, Elder Township and West Carroll Township.

== Extracurriculars ==
Cambria Heights School District offers a wide variety of clubs, activities and an extensive, publicly funded sports program. Eligibility for participation is determined by Cambria Heights School Board policies. The District is noncompliant with state law, due to failing to post its current Interscholastic Athletic Opportunities Disclosure Form on its website.

=== Athletics ===
The following athletics are offered at Cambria Heights:

Varsity Boys athletics

- Baseball - Class AA
- Basketball - Class AA
- Cross Country - Class A
- Football - Class A
- Soccer - Class A
- Swimming and Diving - Class AA
- Track and Field - Class AA
- Wrestling - Class AA

Girls athletics

- Basketball - Class AA
- Cross Country - Class A
- Soccer - Class A
- Softball - Class AA
- Swimming and Diving - Class AA
- Track and Field - Class AA
- Volleyball - Class AA

According to PIAA directory July 2015
