= Glendale Junior/Senior High School =

Location
- 1466 Beaver Valley Road; Flinton, Pennsylvania
- Coordinates: 40.7031°N 78.5384°W

Information
- Type: Public
- NCES School ID: 421083005219
- Principal: Brian Stacey
- Teaching staff: 33.14 (FTE)
- Grades: 7–12
- Enrollment: 346 (2023–2024)
- Student to teacher ratio: 10.44
- Campus type: Rural
- Colors: Blue and Gold
- Mascot: Viking
- Website: Glendale High School

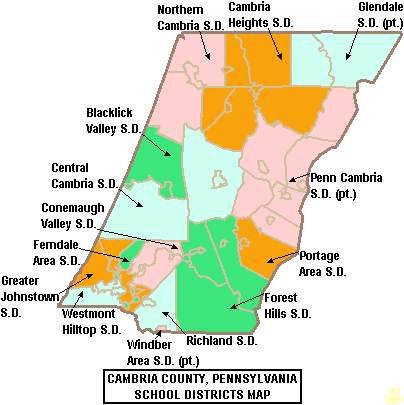
Map of Cambria County, Pennsylvania School Districts

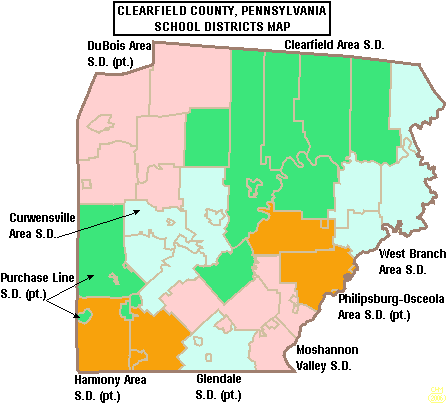
Map of Clearfield County, Pennsylvania Public School Districts

Glendale Junior/Senior High School is a public high school located near the village of Flinton, Pennsylvania. It is the only secondary school in the Glendale School District (Pennsylvania), covering most of northern Cambria County, Pennsylvania, as well as Beccaria Township in Clearfield County. The school's mascot is the Viking.

== Extracurriculars ==
Glendale offers a wide variety of clubs, activities and sports.

=== Athletics ===
Glendale organizes basketball, volleyball, football, softball, baseball, and wrestling. Glendale hosts a cooperative (co-op) program for football, wrestling, and volleyball for students from Harmony Area High School, and sends students to Cambria Heights High School in co-op programs for soccer and track and field. (Note: Compiled from District website, PIAA pages, and PIAA classification reports)

Sports offered
Sport	Boys	Girls	Class	Jr HS	Co-op	Co-op Partner	Host
Baseball	Yes	No	A	No	No	—N/a	—N/a
Basketball	Yes	Yes	A	Yes	No	—N/a	—N/a
Football	Yes	No	A	Yes	Yes	Harmony	Glendale
Soccer*	Yes	Yes	AA	?	Yes	Cambria Heights	@ Cambria Heights
Softball	No	Yes	A	Yes	No	—N/a	—N/a
Track and Field*	Yes	Yes	AA	?	Yes	Cambria Heights	@ Cambria Heights
Volleyball	No	Yes	A	No	No	—N/a	—N/a
Wrestling	Yes	No	AA	Yes	Yes	Harmony	Glendale

=== Clubs and activities ===
- Academic Decathlon
- Aevidum
- Connected with Christ
- Drama Club
- Fellowship of Christian Athletes
- Fly Fishing Club
- National Honor Society (NHS/NJHS)
- Newspaper Club
- Reading Team
- SADD
- Student council
- School-Wide Positive Behavior Support Program
- Science Club
- Take Pride in America
- Tri-M
- Varsity club

=== Music ===
- Marching Band
- Jazz Band
- Chorus
- Majorette Squad
- Winter guard
