= Chest Township, Pennsylvania =

Chest Township can refer to two places in the U.S. state of Pennsylvania:

- Chest Township, Cambria County, Pennsylvania
- Chest Township, Clearfield County, Pennsylvania
