= Glendale School District (Pennsylvania) =

School district in Pennsylvania

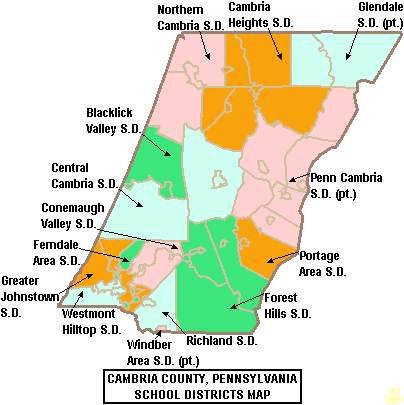
- Map of Cambria County, Pennsylvania Public School Districts

Address
- 1466 Beaver Valley Road Flinton, Clearfield County and Cambria County, Pennsylvania, 16640; United States

District information
- Type: Public
- Grades: KG-12
- Schools: 2
- NCES District ID: 4210830

Students and staff
- Students: 676 (2023-24)
- Teachers: 67.8
- Staff: 145
- Colors: Blue and gold

Other information
- Website: Glendale School District

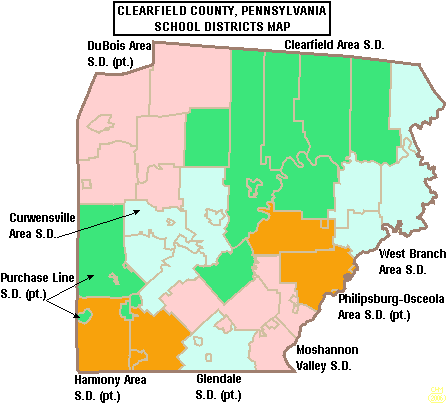
Glendale School District region in Clearfield County

The Glendale School District is a rural, public, K-12 school district in Flinton, Cambria County, Pennsylvania and Clearfield County, Pennsylvania. It encompasses approximately 60 square miles, serving Irvona Borough, Coalport Borough, and Beccaria Township in Clearfield County, and Reade Township and White Township in Cambria County. It is one of the 500 public school districts of Pennsylvania.

== Schools ==
Glendale School District operates two schools: Glendale Elementary School and Glendale Junior/Senior High School. High school students may choose to attend Greater Altoona Career and Technology Center for training in the construction and mechanical trades. The Central Intermediate Unit IU10 provides the district with a wide variety of services like: specialized education for disabled students and hearing; background checks for employees; state mandated recognizing and reporting child abuse training; speech and visual disability services and professional development for staff and faculty.

== Demographics ==
The demographics of the District can be found at the National Center for Education Statistics District Demographic Dashboard 2018–22.
