= Burnside Township, Pennsylvania =

Burnside Township is the name of some places in the U.S. state of Pennsylvania:

- Burnside Township, Centre County, Pennsylvania
- Burnside Township, Clearfield County, Pennsylvania
