= Harmony Area School District =

School district in Pennsylvania

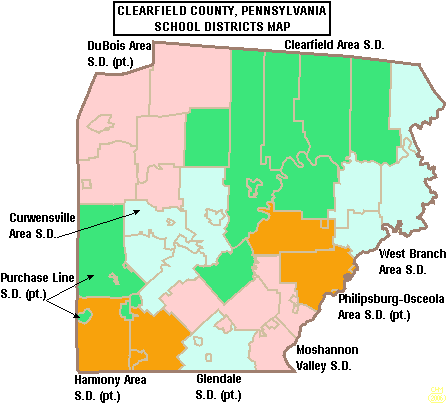

Address
- 5239 Ridge Road Westover, Pennsylvania, Clearfield County, Pennsylvania, 16692; United States

District information
- Type: Public
- Established: 1952

Students and staff
- District mascot: Owls
- Colors: Blue and yellow

Other information
- Website: harmonyowls.com

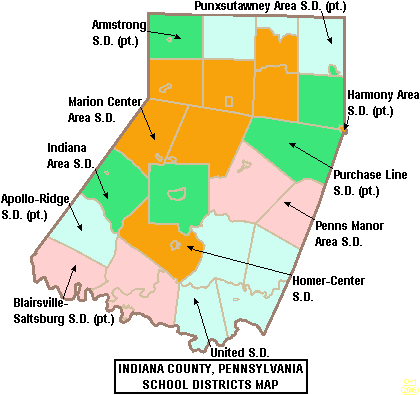
School District region in Indiana County

The Harmony Area School District is a small, rural, public school district which is located in Indiana County, Pennsylvania and Clearfield County, Pennsylvania. The district, which is one of the 500 public school districts of Pennsylvania and one of nine public school districts in Clearfield County, serves residents in Cherry Tree Boro in Indiana County, as well as Westover Boro, Burnside Township, and Chest Township in Clearfield County.

== History and demographics ==
The Harmony Area School District encompasses approximately 86 square miles (220 km^{2}). According to 2000 federal census data, it served a resident population of 2,576. By 2010, the district's population declined to 2,343 people.

The educational attainment levels for the school district population (twenty-five years of age and older) were 85.5% high school graduates and 6.8% college graduates.

In 2009, Harmony Area School District residents’ per capita income was $12,775, while the median family income was $31,413. In the Commonwealth, the median family income was $49,501 compared with the 2010 United States median family income of $49,445.

== Schools ==
The district operates one combined High School/Middle School and one Elementary School, all within the same building. In 2014, Harmony Area High School became a combined high school and junior high school. All students attend school in a single building, which is located at the school complex in Burnside Township.

High school students may choose to attend Clearfield County Career and Technology Center for training in the construction and mechanical trades. The Central Intermediate Unit IU10 provides the district with a wide variety of services, including specialized education for students with disabilities, hearing, speech and visual disability services, and professional development for staff and faculty.

== Extracurriculars ==
Harmony Area School District offers a variety of clubs, activities and sports. Some sports are operated in cooperation with neighboring districts due to low student numbers. Cooperative sports include football, soccer, track and field, and wrestling.

== Harmony athletics ==
There are baseball and softball fields on the school campus. The following are athletics provided solely by Harmony Area:

Sport	Boys	Girls
Baseball	Class A	
Basketball	Class A	Class A
Softball		Class A
