= Clearfield Township, Pennsylvania =

Clearfield Township, Pennsylvania is the name of two places in the U.S. state of Pennsylvania:

- Clearfield Township, Butler County, Pennsylvania
- Clearfield Township, Cambria County, Pennsylvania
