= Athens Open =

Athens Open may refer to:

- ATP Athens Open, a men's tennis tournament held from 1986 to 1994
- Hellenic Championship, a men's tennis tournament held since 2025
- Athens Trophy, a women's tennis tournament held from 1986 to 1990
- Athens Open (WTA), a women's tennis tournament held since 2026

== See also ==
- Athens Trophy
- OpenAthens, a service of the Eduserv Foundation
