= Clearfield Township =

Clearfield Township is the name of some townships in the United States:

- Clearfield Township, North Dakota
- Clearfield Township, Butler County, Pennsylvania
- Clearfield Township, Cambria County, Pennsylvania
