= Harmony Area High School =

School in Pennsylvania, United States

Coordinates: 40.77825°N 78.72656°W

- 5239 Ridge Road; Westover, Pennsylvania

Information
- Type: Public
- Principal: Douglas Martz
- Teaching staff: 17.75 (FTE)
- Grades: 7-12
- Enrollment: 83 (2023-2024)
- Student to teacher ratio: 4.68
- Campus type: Rural
- Colors: Blue and Yellow
- Mascot: Owl
- Website: www.harmonyowls.com

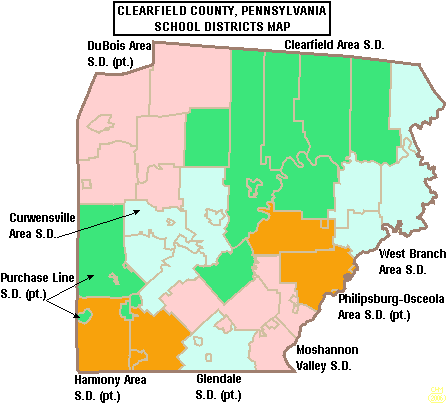
Map of Clearfield County, Pennsylvania Public School Districts

Harmony Area High School is a public high school located in the borough of Westover, Pennsylvania. The high school serves students from most of southwestern Clearfield County, and the borough of Cherry Tree located in Indiana County. The school's mascot is the owl. The school is part of the Harmony Area School District.
