= Burnside Township, Clearfield County, Pennsylvania =

Township in Pennsylvania, US

Coordinates: 40°46′55″N 78°45′07″W

- Township
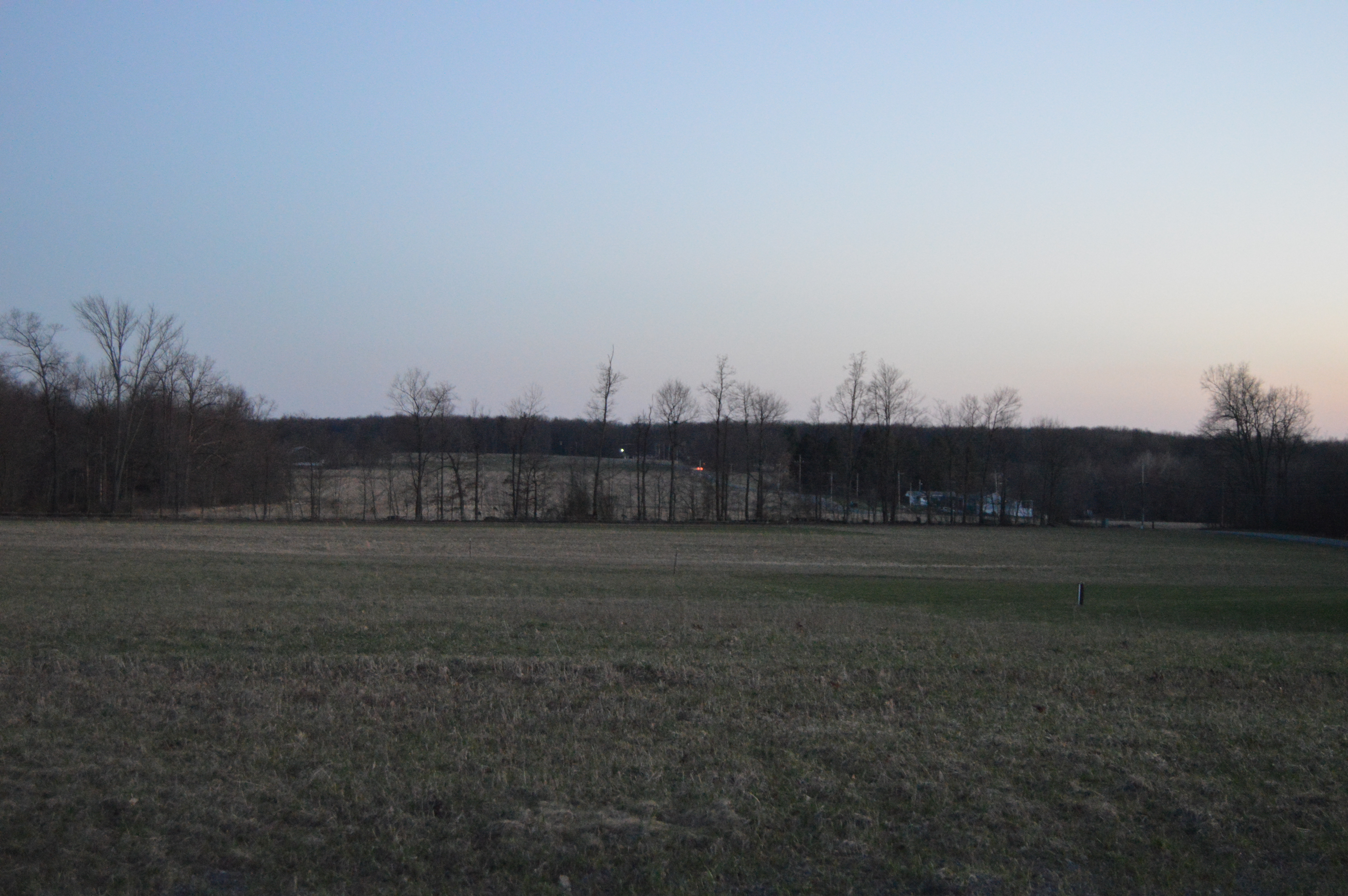
- Countryside west of Westover at dusk

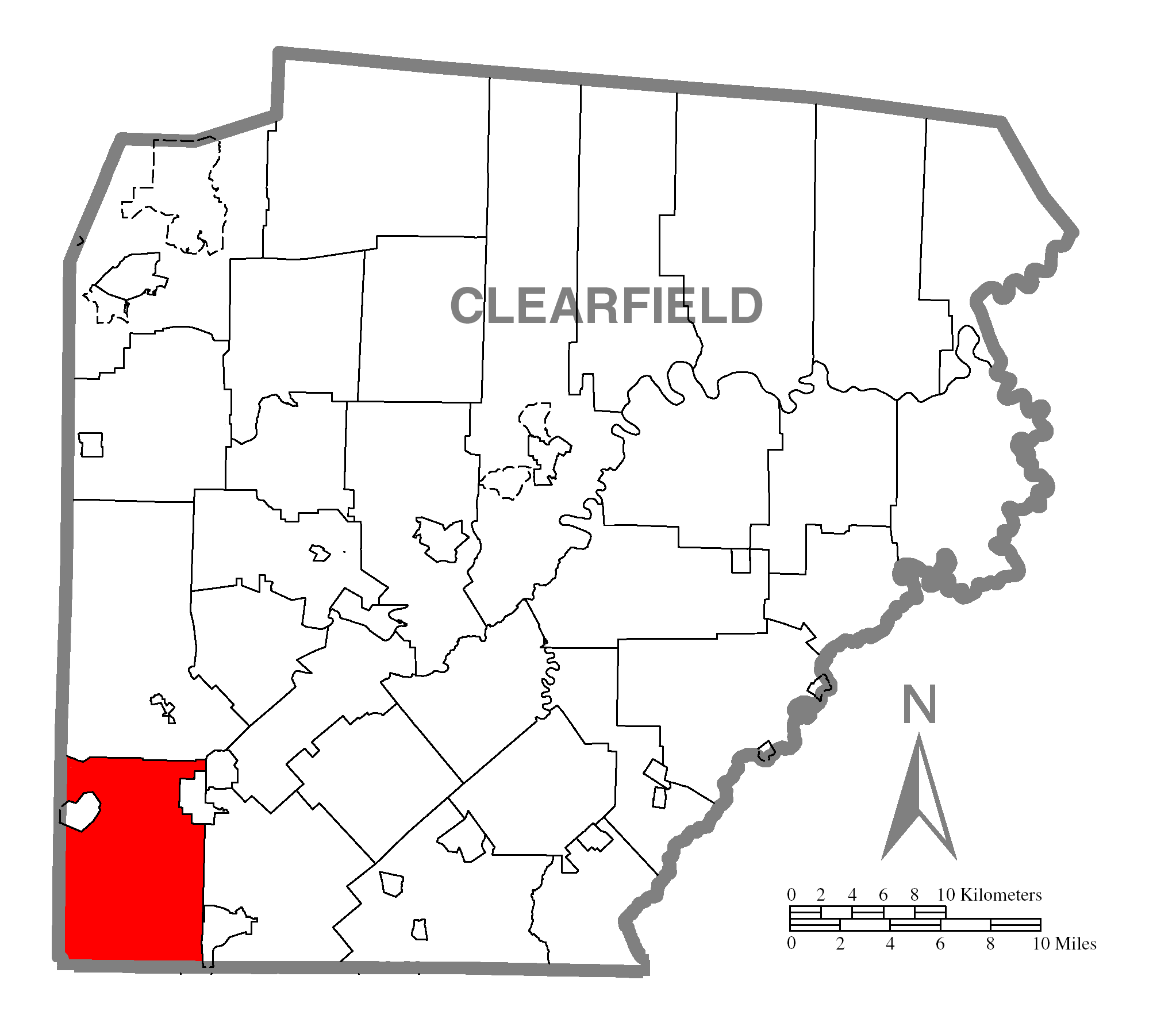
- Map of Clearfield County, Pennsylvania highlighting Burnside Township

- Map of Clearfield County, Pennsylvania
- Country: United States
- State: Pennsylvania
- County: Clearfield
- Settled: 1816
- Incorporated: 1835

Area
  - Total: 44.22 sq mi (114.54 km^{2})
  - Land: 44.00 sq mi (113.96 km^{2})
  - Water: 0.22 sq mi (0.57 km^{2})

Population (2020)
  - Total: 1,064 ▼
  - Estimate (2022): 1,052 ▼
  - Density: 24.0/sq mi (9.25/km^{2})
- Time zone: UTC-5 (Eastern (EST))
  - Summer (DST): UTC-4 (EDT)
- Area code: 814
- FIPS code: 42-033-10288

Burnside Township is a township in Clearfield County, Pennsylvania, United States. The population was 1,064 at the time of the 2020 census.

== Geography ==
According to the United States Census Bureau, the township has a total area of 44.3 square miles (115 km^{2}), all of it land.

== Communities ==
- Harmony
- Patchinville
- Stifflertown

== Demographics ==
Historical population
Census	Pop.	Note	%±
1970	1,020		—
1980	1,246		22.2%
1990	1,137		−8.7%
2000	1,128		−0.8%
2010	1,076		−4.6%
2020	1,064		−1.1%
2022 (est.)	1,052		−1.1%
U.S. Decennial Census

As of the census of 2000, there were 1,128 people, 424 households, and 331 families residing in the township.

The population density was 25.5 people per square mile (9.8/km^{2}). There were 530 housing units at an average density of 12.0/sq mi (4.6/km^{2}).

The racial makeup of the township was 99.29% White, 0.18% Native American, 0.09% Asian, and 0.44% from two or more races. Hispanic or Latino of any race were 0.44% of the population.

There were 424 households, out of which 29.7% had children under the age of eighteen living with them; 66.7% were married couples living together, 7.5% had a female householder with no husband present, and 21.9% were non-families. 18.6% of all households were made up of individuals, and 11.1% had someone living alone who was sixty-five years of age or older.

The average household size was 2.64 and the average family size was 3.02.

In the township the population was spread out, with 23.1% under the age of eighteen, 7.0% from eighteen to twenty-four, 28.1% from twenty-five to forty-four, 24.6% from forty-five to sixty-four, and 17.2% who were sixty-five years of age or older. The median age was forty years.

For every one hundred females there were 100.4 males. For every one hundred females who were aged eighteen or older, there were 97.9 males.

The median income for a household in the township was $31,302, and the median income for a family was $33,882. Males had a median income of $26,050 compared with that of $17,917 for females.

The per capita income for the township was $15,005.

Roughly 14.6% of families and 17.7% of the population were living below the poverty line, including 22.4% of those who were under the age of eighteen and 13.0% of those who were aged sixty-five or older.

== Education ==
Students in Burnside Township attend schools in the Harmony Area School District.
