= Saint Boniface, Pennsylvania =

Unincorporated community in Pennsylvania, US

- Unincorporated community
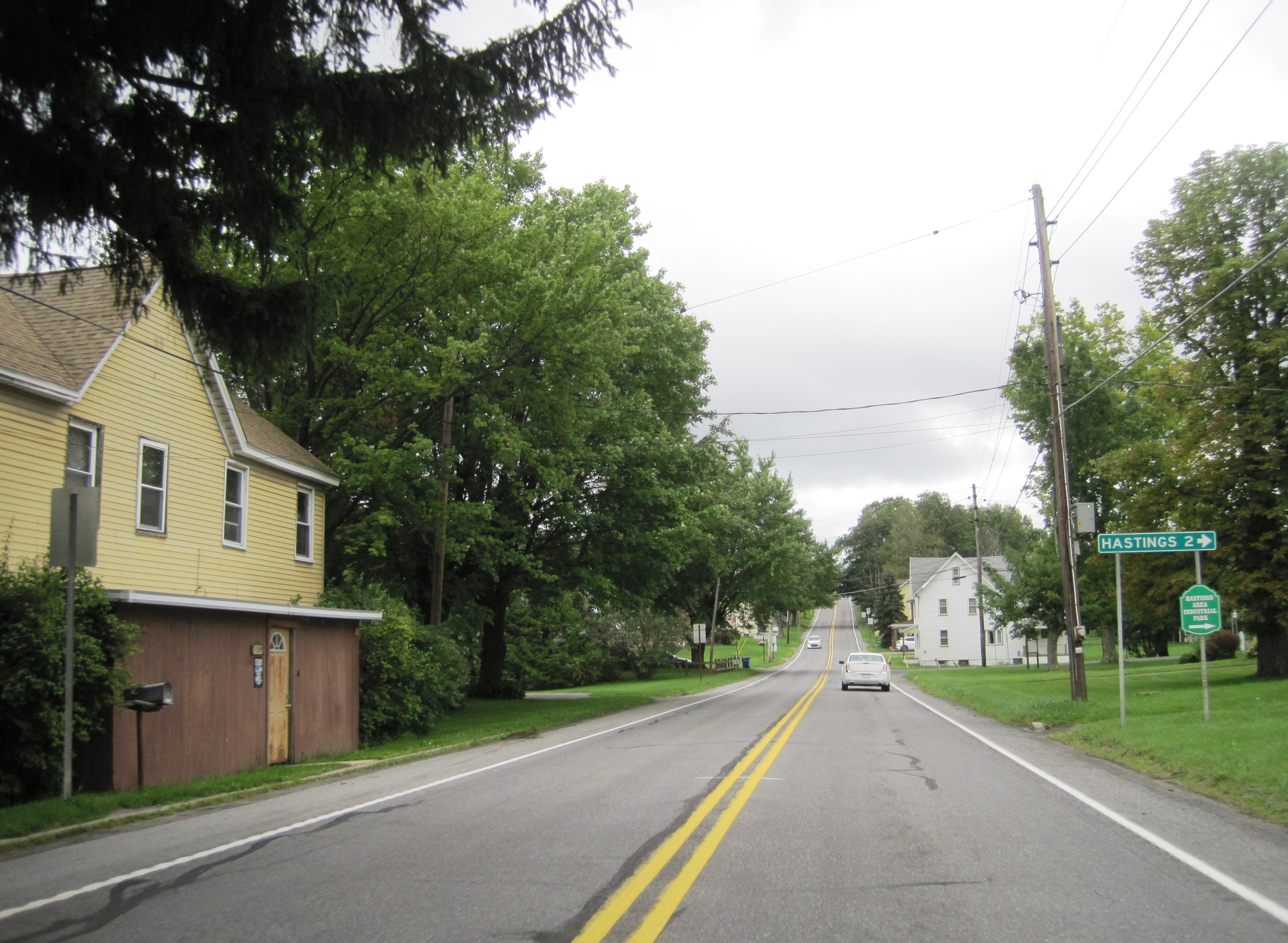
- Southbound PA 36 in Saint Boniface

- Location within Pennsylvania
- Coordinates: 40°40′00″N 78°40′51″W
- Country: United States
- State: Pennsylvania
- County: Cambria
- Elevation: 2,054 ft (626 m)
- Time zone: UTC-5 (Eastern (EST))
  - Summer (DST): UTC-4 (EDT)
- ZIP code: 16675
- Area code: 814
- GNIS feature ID: 1185839

Saint Boniface is an unincorporated community in Cambria County, Pennsylvania, United States. The community is located along Pennsylvania Route 36, 1.7 miles (2.7 km) east of Hastings. Saint Boniface has a post office, with ZIP code 16675.
