= Elder Township, Cambria County, Pennsylvania =

Township in Pennsylvania, US

Coordinates: 40°40′54″N 78°41′03″W

Elder Township, Pennsylvania
- Township
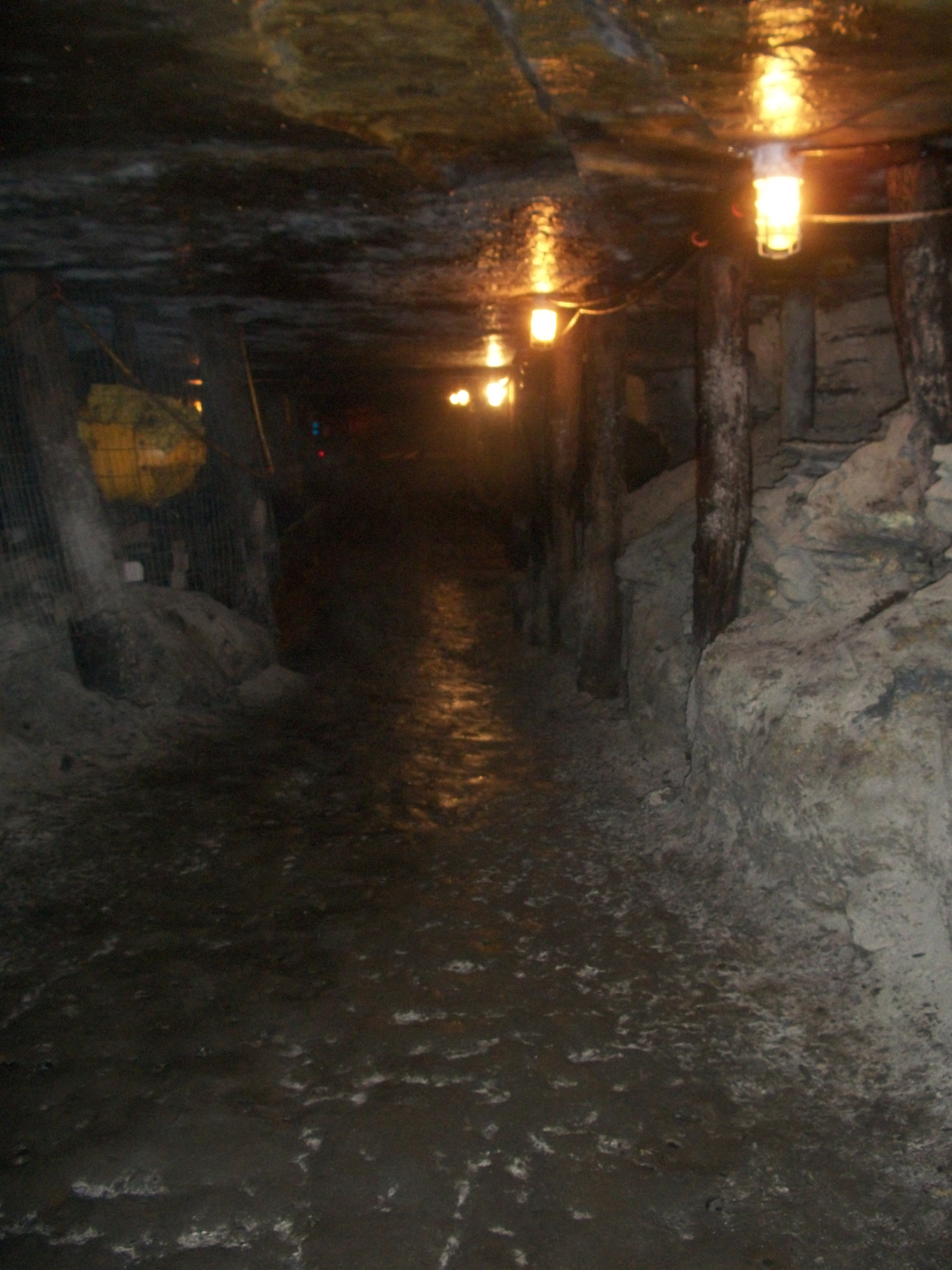
- Seldom Seen Coal Mine

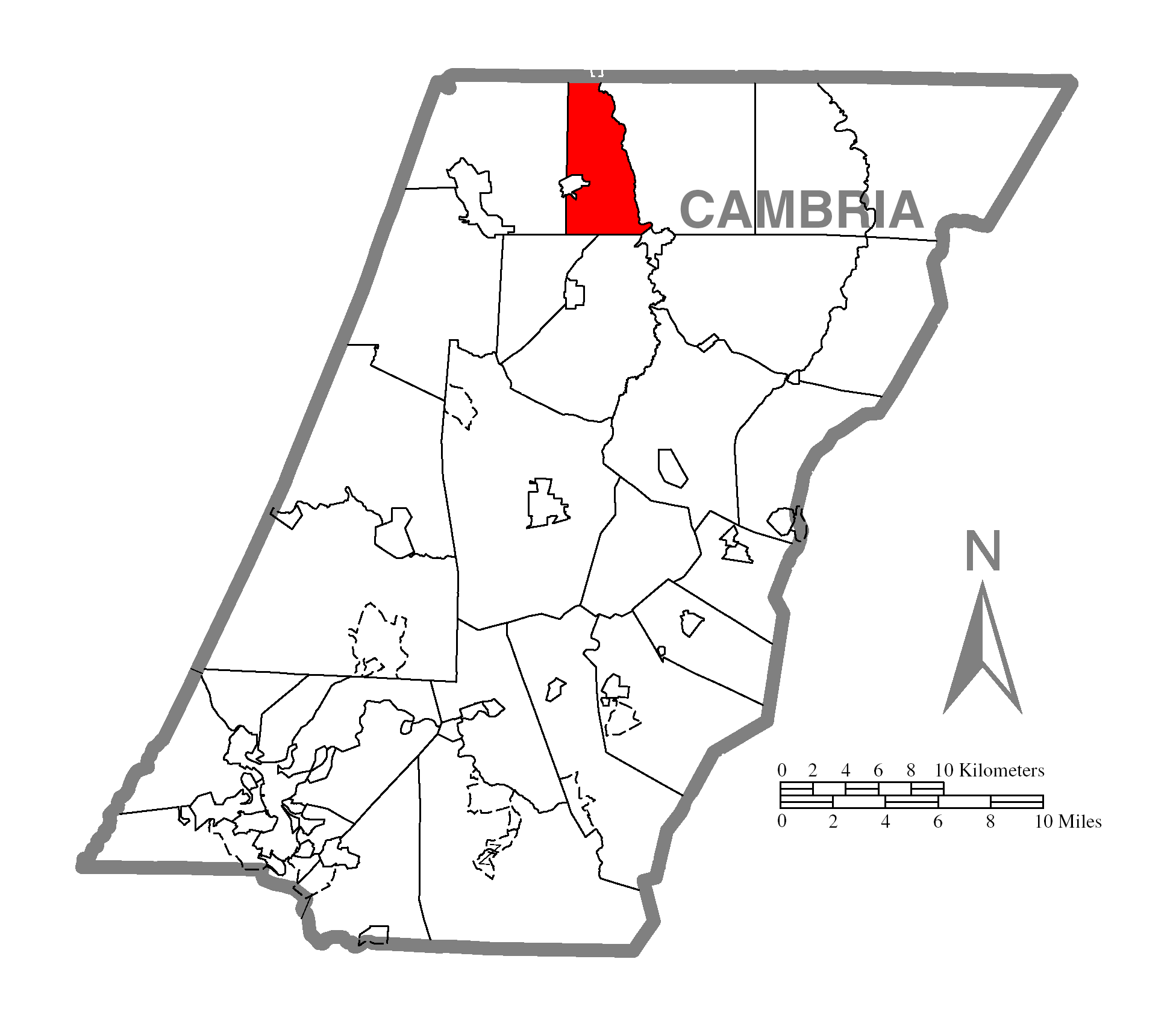
- Map of Cambria County, Pennsylvania highlighting Elder Township

- Map of Cambria County, Pennsylvania
- Country: United States
- State: Pennsylvania
- County: Cambria
- Settled: 1800
- Incorporated: 1878

Area
  - Total: 12.93 sq mi (33.50 km^{2})
  - Land: 12.93 sq mi (33.50 km^{2})
  - Water: 0 sq mi (0.00 km^{2})

Population (2010)
  - Total: 1,038
  - Estimate (2016): 990
  - Density: 76.5/sq mi (29.55/km^{2})
- Time zone: UTC-5 (Eastern (EST))
  - Summer (DST): UTC-4 (EDT)
- Area code: 814
- FIPS code: 42-021-22808
- Website: www.eldertwp.com

Elder Township is a township in Cambria County, Pennsylvania, United States, about 24 miles (39 km) northwest of Altoona. As of the 2010 census, the township had a population of 1,038. It is part of the Johnstown, Pennsylvania Metropolitan Statistical Area.

== Geography ==
Elder Township is located in northern Cambria County at 40.7 N by 78.7 W. It is bordered to the north by Clearfield County. Chest Creek, a northward-flowing tributary of the West Branch Susquehanna River, forms the eastern boundary of the township. The borough of Hastings sits along the western border of the township but is separate from it. The borough of Patton touches the southeastern corner of the township. Ebensburg, the Cambria County seat, is 14 miles (23 km) to the south.

According to the United States Census Bureau, the township has a total area of 12.9 square miles (33.5 km^{2}), all land.

== Communities ==
=== Unincorporated communities ===
- Saint Boniface
- Swedetown
- Thomas Mill

== Demographics ==
Historical population
| Census | Pop. | Note | %± |
|---|---|---|---|
| 2000 | 990 | | — |
| 2010 | 1,038 | | 4.8% |
| 2016 (est.) | 990 | | −4.6% |
U.S. Decennial Census

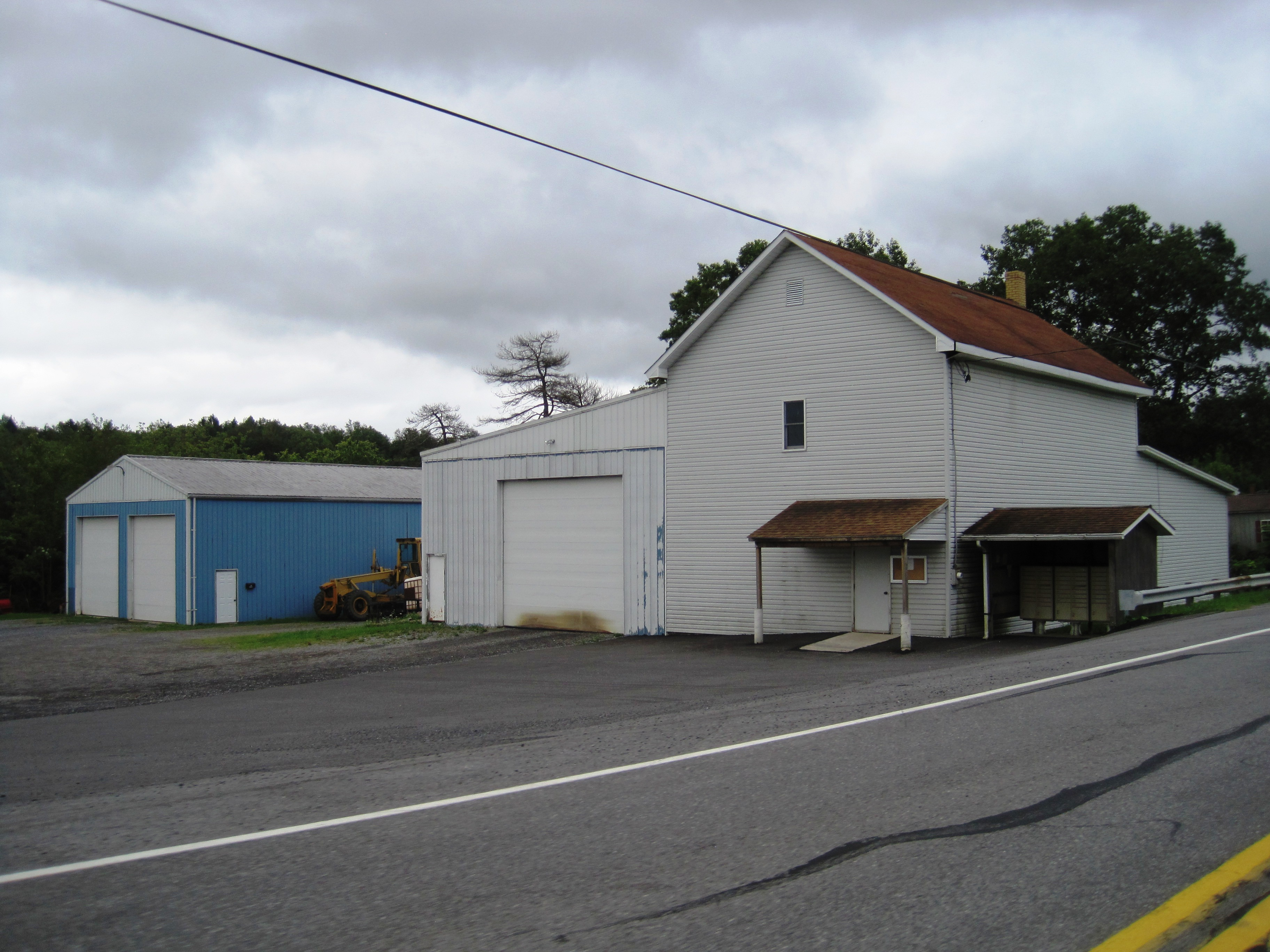
Town hall

At the 2000 census there were 990 people, 375 households, and 289 families residing in the township. The population density was 76.2 inhabitants per square mile (29.4/km^{2}). There were 397 housing units at an average density of 30.6 per square mile (11.8/km^{2}). The racial makeup of the township was 99.90% White and 0.10% African American. There were 375 households, 31.2% had children under the age of 18 living with them, 65.1% were married couples living together, 5.6% had a female householder with no husband present, and 22.7% were non-families. 20.0% of households were made up of individuals, and 13.1% were one person aged 65 or older. The average household size was 2.64 and the average family size was 3.02.

The age distribution was 23.3% under the age of 18, 7.8% from 18 to 24, 26.0% from 25 to 44, 26.3% from 45 to 64, and 16.7% 65 or older. The median age was 41 years. For every 100 females, there were 111.1 males. For every 100 females age 18 and over, there were 104.0 males.

The median household income was $30,577 and the median family income was $35,347. Males had a median income of $28,409 versus $18,750 for females. The per capita income for the township was $13,862. About 5.7% of families and 8.6% of the population were below the poverty line, including 11.1% of those under age 18 and 6.4% of those age 65 or over.
