= Bridge in Westover Borough =

- U.S. National Register of Historic Places
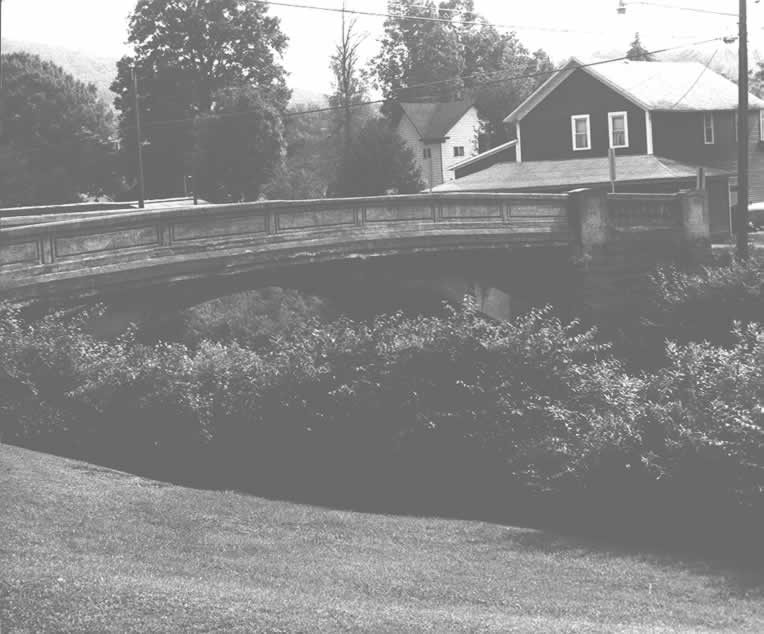
- Side of the bridge

- Location within Pennsylvania Location within the United States
- Location: LR 17003/TR 185 over Chest Creek, Westover, Pennsylvania
- Coordinates: 40°45′9″N 78°40′3″W
- Built: 1917
- Architect: Flink, G.A.; Whitaker & Diehl
- Architectural style: Open-spandrel arch
- MPS: Highway Bridges Owned by the Commonwealth of Pennsylvania, Department of Transportation TR
- NRHP reference No.: 88000736
- Added to NRHP: June 22, 1988

Bridge in Westover Borough is an historic Open-spandrel arch bridge over the Chest Creek located in Westover, Clearfield County, Pennsylvania, United States. It is a single span concrete bridge constructed in 1917.

It was listed on the National Register of Historic Places in 1988.

== See also ==
- National Register of Historic Places listings in Clearfield County, Pennsylvania
