= Edgar Cortright =

Senior NASA official-administrator (1923–2014)

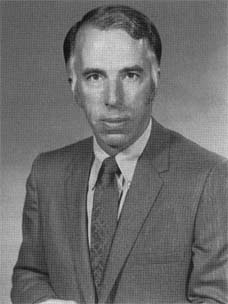
- Born: Edgar Maurice Cortright; July 29, 1923; Hastings, Pennsylvania, United States
- Died: May 4, 2014 (aged 90); Palm City, Florida, U.S.
- Education: B.S., Rensselaer Polytechnic Institute, 1947; M.S., Rensselaer Polytechnic Institute, 1949; D.Eng., Rensselaer Polytechnic Institute, 1975
- Occupations: Engineering and executive positions at NASA and private corporations

Edgar Maurice Cortright (July 29, 1923 – May 4, 2014) was a scientist and engineer, and senior official at the National Aeronautics and Space Administration (NASA) in the United States. His most prominent positions during his career were Director of NASA's Langley Research Center, and Chairman of the Apollo 13 Review Board which investigated the explosion that occurred during the Apollo 13 spaceflight in 1970.

== Education ==
Cortright was born on July 29, 1923, in Hastings, Pennsylvania, a coal mining district in the west of the state. His family moved to the Philadelphia area where he attended high school. He earned a Bachelor of Science degree followed by a Master of Science degree in aeronautical engineering at Rensselaer Polytechnic Institute (RPI) in 1947 and 1949. At RPI, he was roommates with George Low (who went on to become NASA Administrator, and later President of RPI). He attended the National Advisory Committee for Aeronautics (NACA) Nuclear Engineering School in 1957. Later, in 1975, he got a Doctor of Engineering degree from Rensselaer (during his time as Director at NASA Langley). He gained membership to the Stephen Van Rensselaer Society of Patroons, people who have donate $1 million or more to Rensselaer.

== Family ==
His parents were Janet Pearsall Cortright and Edgar Maurice Cortright Sr. He had a sister, Janet, who died before him, and a brother, David. He married Beverly Jane Hotaling in 1945 and she died in 2012. Their children were Susan and David, and Cortright had three grandsons at the time of his death.

== Career ==
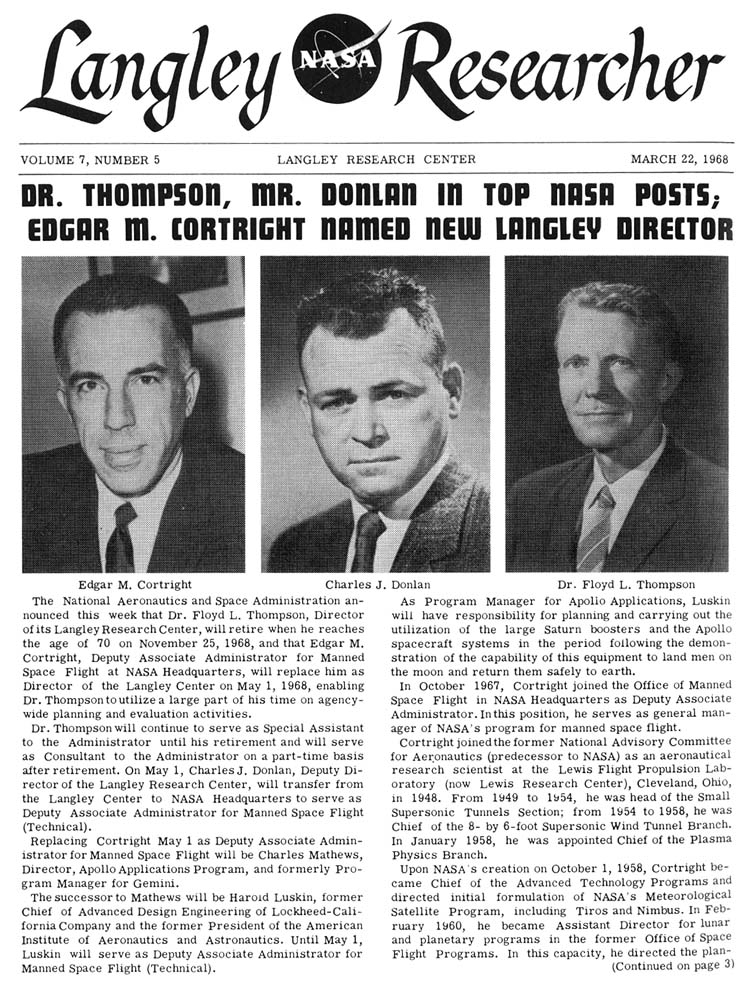
Announcement of appointment at Langley

Cortright joined the Naval Reserve Officer Training Corps in 1941 and served as a United States Navy officer during World War II, advancing to the rank of Lieutenant. His final military assignment was as a Program Manager for supercharging the Vought F4U Corsair. He left the Navy to pursue graduate education and then went on to work at the Lewis Flight Propulsion Laboratory (now the Glenn Research Center) at NACA, in Cleveland, Ohio. There, he held the positions of Aeronautical Research Scientist (1948); Head of Small Supersonic Tunnels Section (1949–1954); and Chief, Eight-by-Six-Foot Supersonic Wind Tunnel Branch (1954–1958).

=== NASA ===
He joined the newly formed NASA agency (successor to the NACA) as a founding member in 1958 and worked at NASA Headquarters in Washington, D.C., where he was Chief of Advanced Technology (1958–1959); Assistant Director for Lunar and Planetary Programs, Office of Space Flight Programs, (1960–61); Deputy Director for Space Science and Applications (1961–1963); Deputy Associate Administrator for Space Science and Applications (1963–1968); and Deputy Associate Administrator, Office of Manned Space Flight, (1968).

He was awarded the NASA Distinguished Service Medal in October 1967.

He was Director of the Langley Research Center in Hampton, Virginia, from 1968 to 1975. Following the spacecraft explosion during the Apollo 13 spaceflight in April 1970, Cortright was appointed chairman of the Apollo 13 Review Board which was established to investigate the cause of the accident. The Board reported its findings to NASA in June 1970.

=== After NASA ===
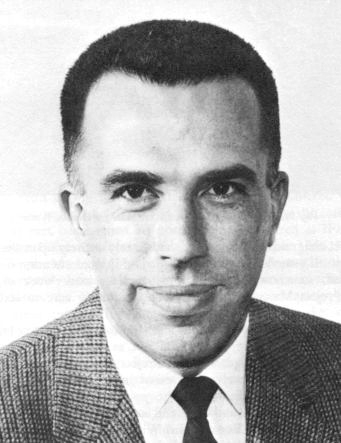
Edgar Cortright

Cortright left NASA to become Corporate Vice President and Technical Director at Owens Illinois Corporation from 1975–1979. He also held the positions of Senior Vice President for Science and Engineering (1978) and President (1979–1983) at Lockheed-California Company in Los Angeles, California.

He died from a stroke in Palm City, Florida, on May 4, 2014, aged 90.
