= Coalport, Pennsylvania =

Borough in Pennsylvania, US

- Borough
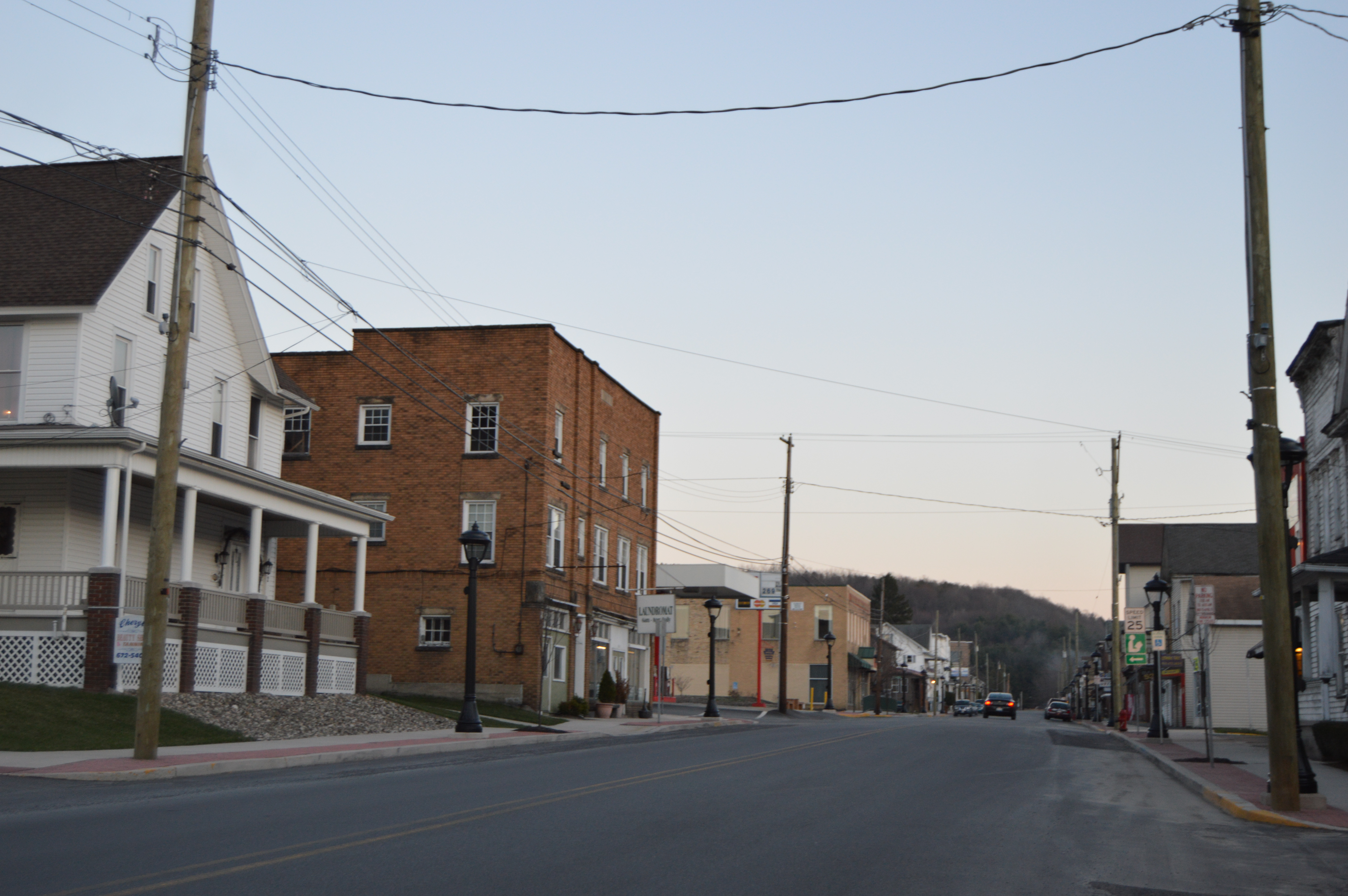
- Main Street south of Spruce

- Location of Coalport in Clearfield County, Pennsylvania.

- Map showing Clearfield County in Pennsylvania

- Location in Pennsylvania
- Coordinates: 40°44′53″N 78°32′04″W
- Country: United States
- State: Pennsylvania
- County: Clearfield
- Settled: 1876
- Incorporated: 1883

Government
  - Type: Borough Council

Area
  - Total: 0.38 sq mi (0.98 km^{2})
  - Land: 0.37 sq mi (0.97 km^{2})
  - Water: 0.0039 sq mi (0.01 km^{2})
- Elevation: 1,382 ft (421 m)

Population (2020)
  - Total: 425
  - Density: 1,136.2/sq mi (438.67/km^{2})
- Time zone: UTC-5 (Eastern (EST))
  - Summer (DST): UTC-4 (EDT)
- ZIP code: 16627
- Area code: 814
- FIPS code: 42-14656

Coalport is a borough in Clearfield County, Pennsylvania, United States. The population was 425 at the 2020 census.

== Geography ==
Coalport is located in southern Clearfield County at 40°44′53″N 78°32′04″W, on the east side of Clearfield Creek, a north-flowing tributary of the West Branch Susquehanna River. Pennsylvania Route 53 passes through the borough, leading north 2 miles (3 km) to Irvona and south 2 miles (3 km) to Flinton in Cambria County.

According to the United States Census Bureau, Coalport has a total area of 0.38 square miles (0.98 km^{2}), of which 0.004 square miles (0.01 km^{2}), or 1.45%, is water.

== Demographics ==
Historical population
Census	Pop.	Note	%±
1890	855		—
1900	938		9.7%
1910	876		−6.6%
1920	1,079		23.2%
1930	1,222		13.3%
1940	1,121		−8.3%
1950	1,052		−6.2%
1960	821		−22.0%
1970	796		−3.0%
1980	739		−7.2%
1990	578		−21.8%
2000	490		−15.2%
2010	523		6.7%
2020	425		−18.7%
2021 (est.)	426	▲	0.2%

As of the census of 2000, there were 490 people, 223 households, and 132 families residing in the borough. The population density was 1,273.9 inhabitants per square mile (491.9/km^{2}). There were 260 housing units at an average density of 675.9 per square mile (261.0/km^{2}). The racial makeup of the borough was 98.57% White, 1.02% Asian, 0.20% from other races, and 0.20% from two or more races. Hispanic or Latino of any race were 0.20% of the population.

There were 223 households, out of which 21.1% had children under the age of 18 living with them, 45.7% were married couples living together, 9.0% had a female householder with no husband present, and 40.8% were non-families. 36.8% of all households were made up of individuals, and 15.7% had someone living alone who was 65 years of age or older. The average household size was 2.20 and the average family size was 2.89.

In the borough the population was spread out, with 19.0% under the age of 18, 9.4% from 18 to 24, 27.6% from 25 to 44, 25.3% from 45 to 64, and 18.8% who were 65 years of age or older. The median age was 42 years. For every 100 females there were 92.2 males. For every 100 females age 18 and over, there were 93.7 males.

The median income for a household in the borough was $26,528, and the median income for a family was $40,833. Males had a median income of $28,438 versus $20,313 for females. The per capita income for the borough was $16,232. About 12.1% of families and 15.6% of the population were below the poverty line, including 24.6% of those under age 18 and 9.6% of those age 65 or over.
