= Clearfield Creek =

Stream in Pennsylvania, United States

Physical characteristics
- Source
  - location: Woodlands near Loretto, Pennsylvania, near junction of Vale Rd. with Dream Rd.
  - coordinates: 40°28′51″N 78°38′50″W
- Mouth
  - location: West Branch Susquehanna River within Clearfield, Pennsylvania.
  - coordinates: 41°01′29″N 78°23′57″W
- Length: 73.4 mi (118.1 km)

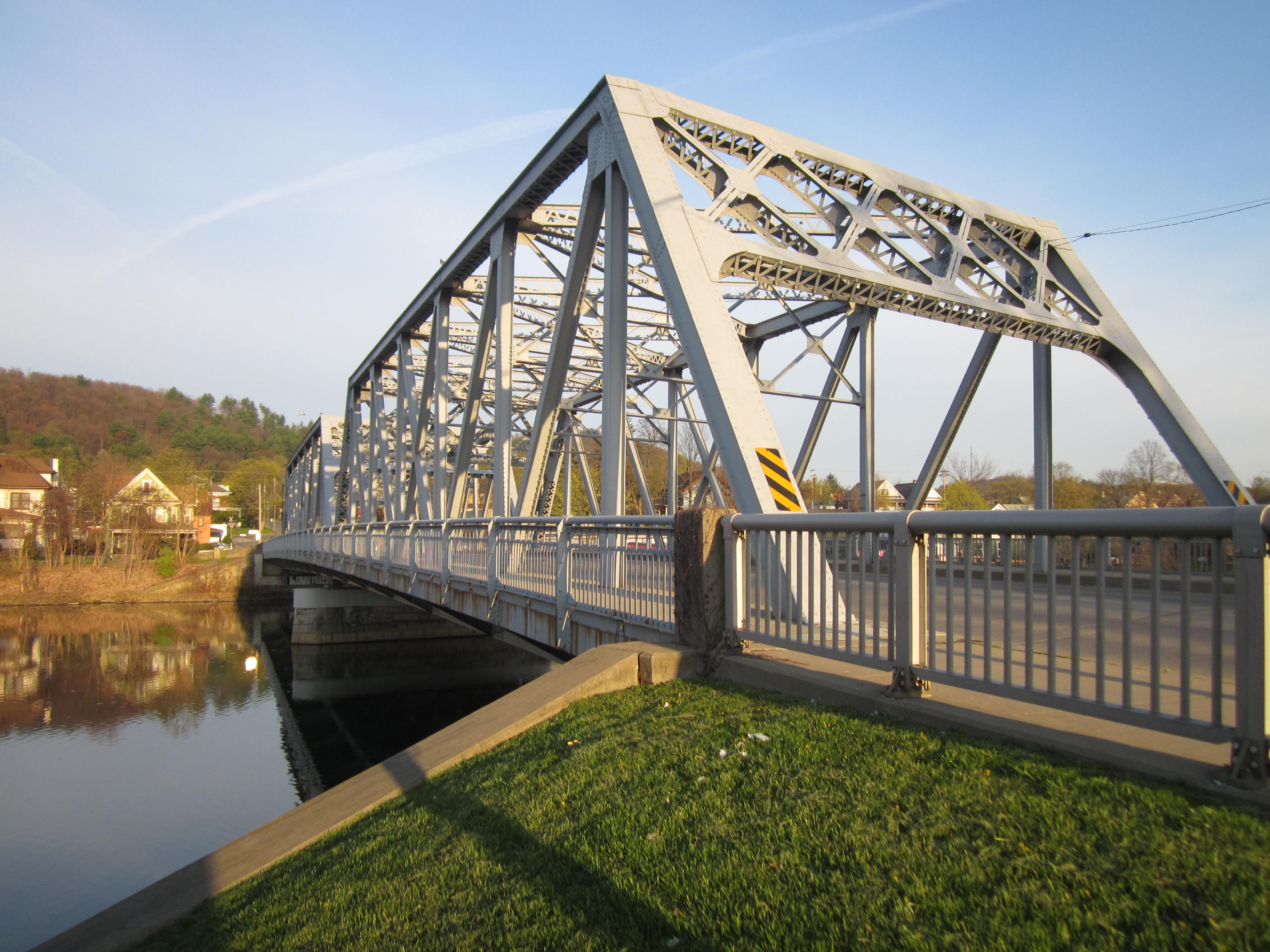

Clearfield Creek is a 73.4-mile-long (118.1 km) tributary of the West Branch Susquehanna River in Cambria and Clearfield counties, Pennsylvania, in the United States.

Clearfield Creek rises in woodlands near Loretto, Pennsylvania, initially running generally eastward. After being dammed to form Cresson Lake, it flows generally northeast or north-northeast, receiving tributaries from both east and west. Paralleled along much of its length by Pennsylvania Route 53, it passes through small towns such as Ashville, Coalport, and Glen Hope, joining the West Branch Susquehanna River near the community of Clearfield. Its valley was used by the Pennsylvania Railroad as a railroad corridor, climbing from Clearfield to a wye junction in Cresson. The Cresson–Flinton section is still used by the R.J. Corman Railroad/Pennsylvania Lines.

Clearfield Creek was named for the clear fields cut down by grazing buffalo.

== See also ==
- List of rivers of Pennsylvania
