= Chest (mechanical engineering) =

Combustion engine component

A valve chest (often called a steam chest) is a chamber or housing in a steam engine that contains valves controlling the admission, distribution, or regulation of steam. In reciprocating steam engines, the valve chest is typically mounted adjacent to or above the cylinder and encloses the valve gear that distributes steam during operation. In steam-turbine installations, the term may also refer to a separate chamber or casing that houses turbine stop valves or control valves regulating steam flow into the turbine. It is normally closed by a removable cover or lid sealed with a gasket to allow inspection and maintenance of the valve components.
