= Hope chest (disambiguation) =

Hope chest can refer to:

- Hope chest, a box containing items stored for a future marriage
- Hope Chest: The Fredonia Recordings 1982-1983, an album by 10,000 Maniacs
- The Hope Chest, a 1918 American film
- HopeChest, an American Christian young women's magazine
- Hopechest, a 1996 album by Stephanie Bentley
- Hope Chest, an American shoegaze / dream pop band from California formed in 1992
