= Ashville, Pennsylvania =

Borough in Pennsylvania, US

- Borough
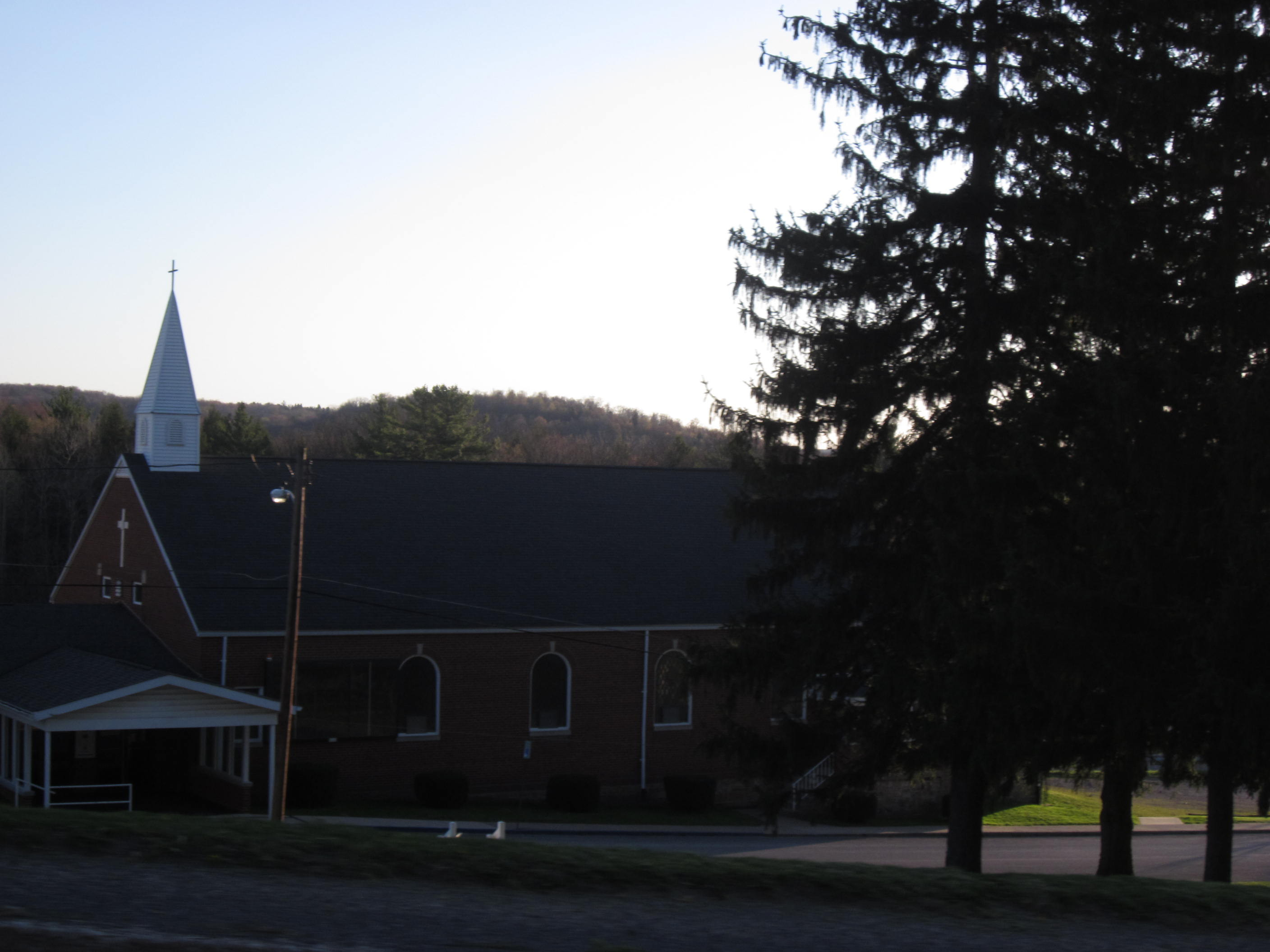
- St. Thomas Aquinas Church in Ashville

- Location of Ashville in Cambria County, Pennsylvania.

- Map of Cambria County, Pennsylvania

- Location in Pennsylvania Ashville (the United States) Ashville (North America)
- Coordinates: 40°33′33″N 78°32′53″W
- Country: United States
- State: Pennsylvania
- County: Cambria
- Settled: 1842
- Incorporated: 1887

Government
  - Type: Borough Council

Area
  - Total: 0.18 sq mi (0.47 km^{2})
  - Land: 0.18 sq mi (0.47 km^{2})
  - Water: 0 sq mi (0.00 km^{2})
- Elevation: 1,680 ft (510 m)

Population (2020)
  - Total: 213
  - Density: 1,166.2/sq mi (450.27/km^{2})
- Time zone: UTC-5 (Eastern (EST))
  - Summer (DST): UTC-4 (EDT)
- Zip code: 16613
- Area code: 814
- FIPS code: 42-03296
- GNIS feature ID: 1215008

Ashville is a borough in Cambria County, Pennsylvania, United States. It is part of the Johnstown, Pennsylvania Metropolitan Statistical Area. However, it is much closer to Altoona and is often considered a suburb of the latter. The population was 213 at the 2020 census.

== Geography ==
Ashville is located in northeastern Cambria County. It is in the valley of Clearfield Creek, a northward-flowing tributary of the West Branch Susquehanna River, and the trace of the eastern continental divide either passes through or is just east of town, in the abutting Gallitzin Township to the south.

According to the United States Census Bureau, the borough of Ashville has a total area of 0.18 square miles (0.46 km^{2}), all land.

== Demographics ==
Historical population
Census	Pop.	Note	%±
1890	289		—
1900	393		36.0%
1910	384		−2.3%
1920	447		16.4%
1930	486		8.7%
1940	511		5.1%
1950	441		−13.7%
1960	422		−4.3%
1970	409		−3.1%
1980	383		−6.4%
1990	306		−20.1%
2000	279		−8.8%
2010	227		−18.6%
2020	213		−6.2%
U.S. Decennial Census

As of the census of 2010, there were 227 people, 102 households, and 62 families residing in the borough. The population density was 1,289.9 inhabitants per square mile (498.0/km^{2}). There were 111 housing units at an average density of 630.8 per square mile (243.6/km^{2}). The racial makeup of the borough was 97.4% White, 0.9% Black or African American, 0.4% Native Hawaiian, 0.9% from other races, and 0.4% from two or more races. Hispanic or Latino of any race were 0.9% of the population.

There were 102 households, out of which 27.5% had children under the age of 18 living with them, 34.3% were married couples living together, 19.6% had a female householder with no husband present, and 33.6% were non-families. 39.2% of all households were made up of individuals, and 17.7% had someone living alone who was 65 years of age or older. The average household size was 2.23 and the average family size was 2.87.

In the borough the population was spread out, with 24.2% under the age of 18, 7.5% from 18 to 24, 22.9% from 25 to 44, 22.0% from 45 to 64, and 23.3% who were 65 years of age or older. The median age was 40 years. For every 100 females there were 102.7 males. For every 100 females age 18 and over, there were 95.5 males.

The median income for a household in the borough was $38,409, and the median income for a family was $45,208. Males had a median income of $35,417 versus $36,667 for females. The per capita income for the borough was $22,999. About 12.3% of families and 15.6% of the population were below the poverty line, including 27.7% of those under the age of eighteen and none of those sixty five or over.

== Education ==
It is in the Penn Cambria School District.
