= Clearfield Township, Cambria County, Pennsylvania =

Township in Pennsylvania, US

Coordinates: 40°36′30″N 78°34′28″W

- Township
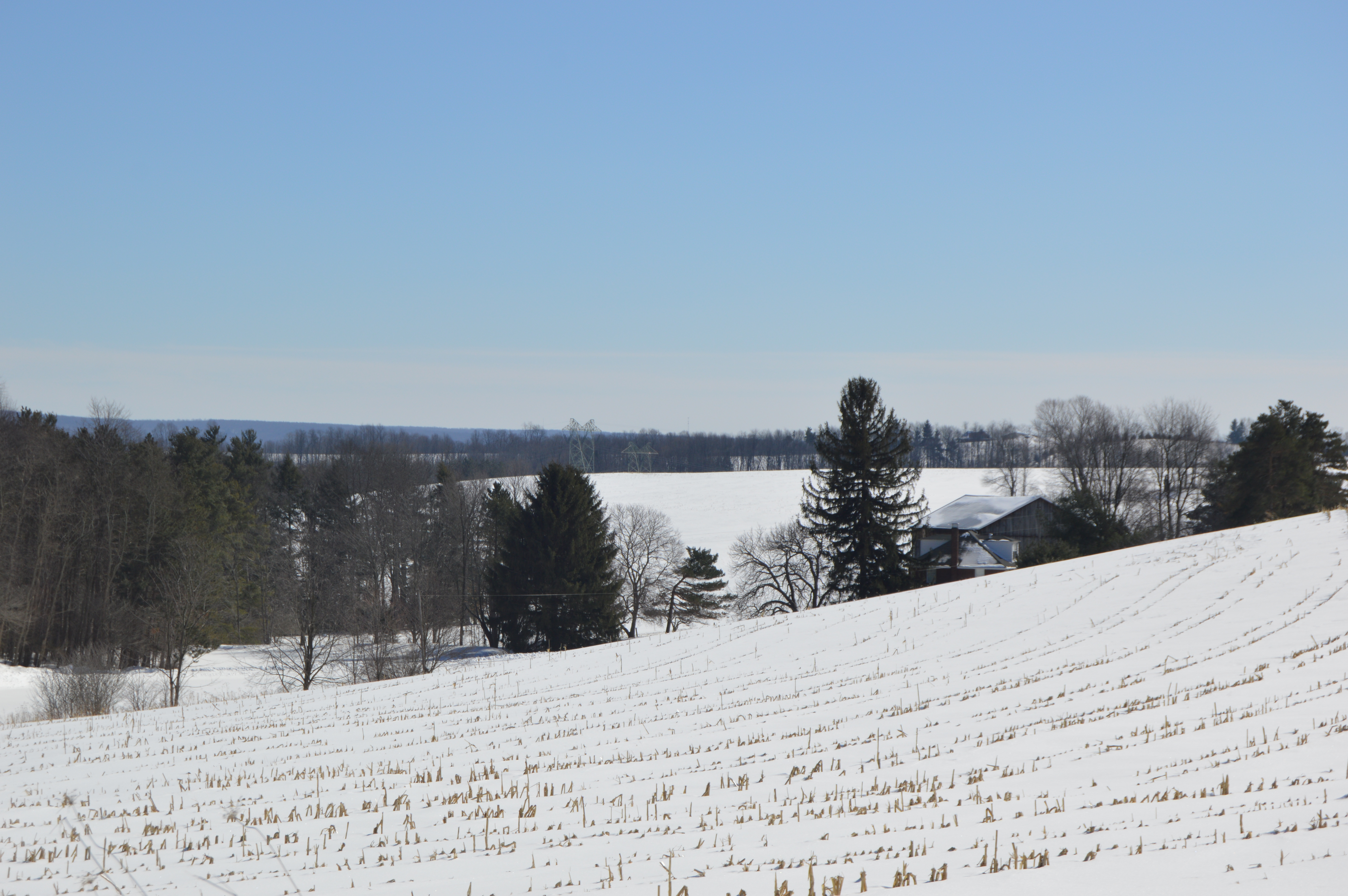
- Hills outside Chest Springs

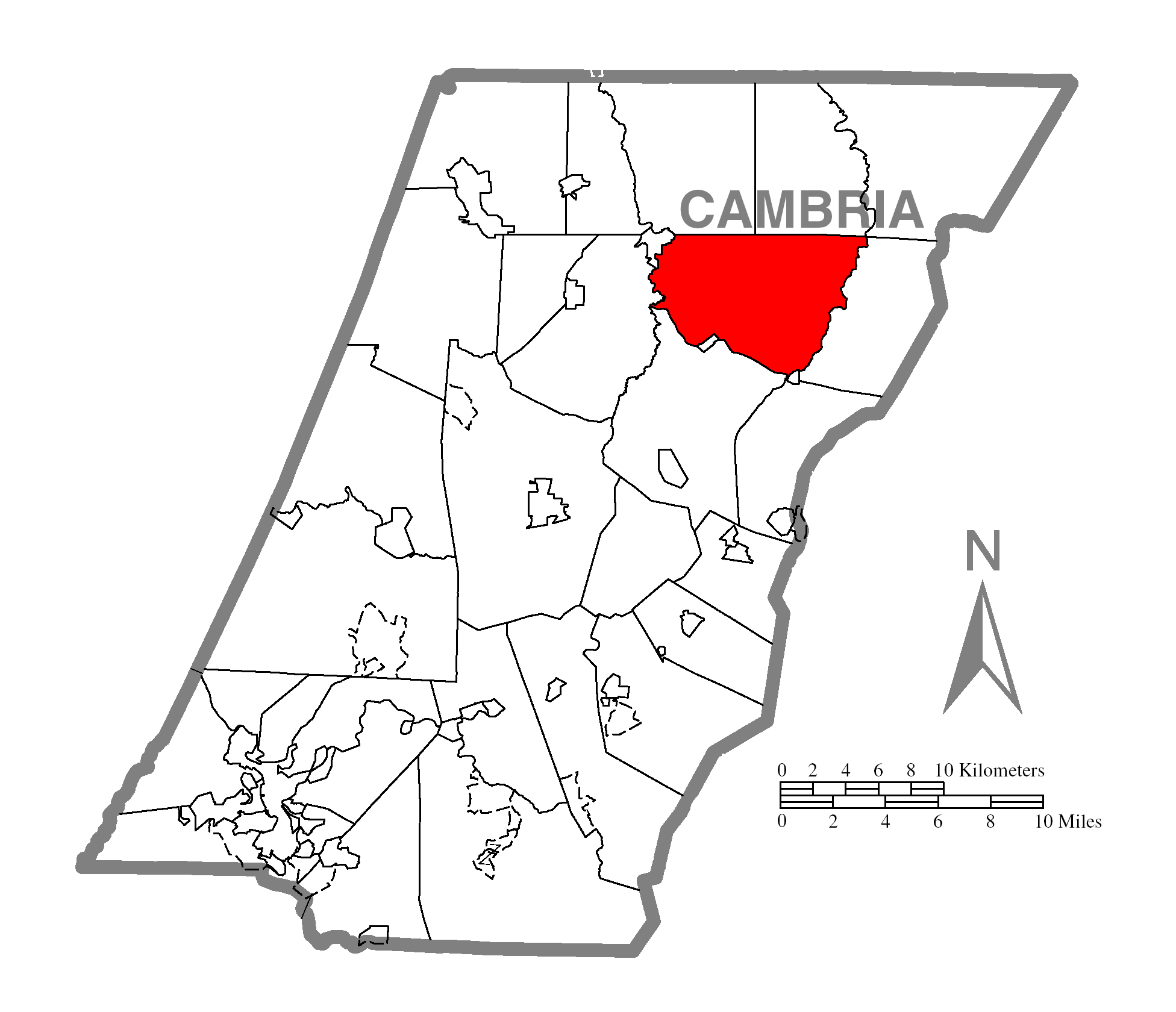
- Map of Cambria County, Pennsylvania highlighting Clearfield Township

- Map of Cambria County, Pennsylvania
- Country: United States
- State: Pennsylvania
- County: Cambria
- Incorporated: 1822

Area
  - Total: 30.98 sq mi (80.25 km^{2})
  - Land: 30.98 sq mi (80.25 km^{2})
  - Water: 0 sq mi (0.00 km^{2})

Population (2020)
  - Total: 1,608 ▲
  - Estimate (2021): 1,597
  - Density: 49.6/sq mi (19.15/km^{2})
- Time zone: UTC-5 (Eastern (EST))
  - Summer (DST): UTC-4 (EDT)
- Area code: 814
- FIPS code: 42-021-14056

Clearfield Township is a township in Cambria County, Pennsylvania, United States. The population was 1,608 at the 2020 census. It is part of the Johnstown, Pennsylvania Metropolitan Statistical Area.

== Geography ==
Clearfield Township is located in northeastern Cambria County at 40.570154,-78.659363. It is bordered on the east by Clearfield Creek and on the west by Chest Creek, both of which are northward-flowing tributaries of the West Branch Susquehanna River. The township is bordered by the borough of Patton to the northwest, Chest Springs to the south, and Ashville to the southeast. Ebensburg, the county seat, is 12 miles (19 km) to the southwest, and Altoona is 15 miles (24 km) to the southeast.

According to the United States Census Bureau, Clearfield Township has a total area of 31.0 square miles (80.3 km^{2}), all land.

== Communities ==
=== Unincorporated community ===
- Saint Augustine

== Demographics ==
Historical population
Census	Pop.	Note	%±
2000	1,680		—
2010	1,604		−4.5%
2020	1,608		0.2%
2021 (est.)	1,597		−0.7%
U.S. Decennial Census

At the 2000 census there were 1,680 people, 571 households, and 452 families in the township. The population density was 54.3 inhabitants per square mile (21.0/km^{2}). There were 627 housing units at an average density of 20.3/sq mi (7.8/km^{2}). The racial makeup of the township was 99.29% White, 0.18% African American, 0.06% Native American, 0.06% Asian, 0.06% from other races, and 0.36% from two or more races. Hispanic or Latino of any race were 0.60%.

There were 571 households, 38.9% had children under the age of 18 living with them, 70.4% were married couples living together, 5.6% had a female householder with no husband present, and 20.8% were non-families. 17.7% of households were made up of individuals, and 8.8% were one person aged 65 or older. The average household size was 2.90 and the average family size was 3.31.

The age distribution was 26.8% under the age of 18, 9.6% from 18 to 24, 27.4% from 25 to 44, 25.4% from 45 to 64, and 10.7% 65 or older. The median age was 37 years. For every 100 females there were 104.4 males. For every 100 females age 18 and over, there were 101.8 males.

The median household income was $41,200 and the median family income was $45,707. Males had a median income of $30,069 versus $22,083 for females. The per capita income for the township was $15,241. About 6.3% of families and 8.2% of the population were below the poverty line, including 9.3% of those under age 18 and 9.4% of those age 65 or over.
