= East Carroll Township, Cambria County, Pennsylvania =

Township in Pennsylvania, US

East Carroll Township, Pennsylvania
- Township
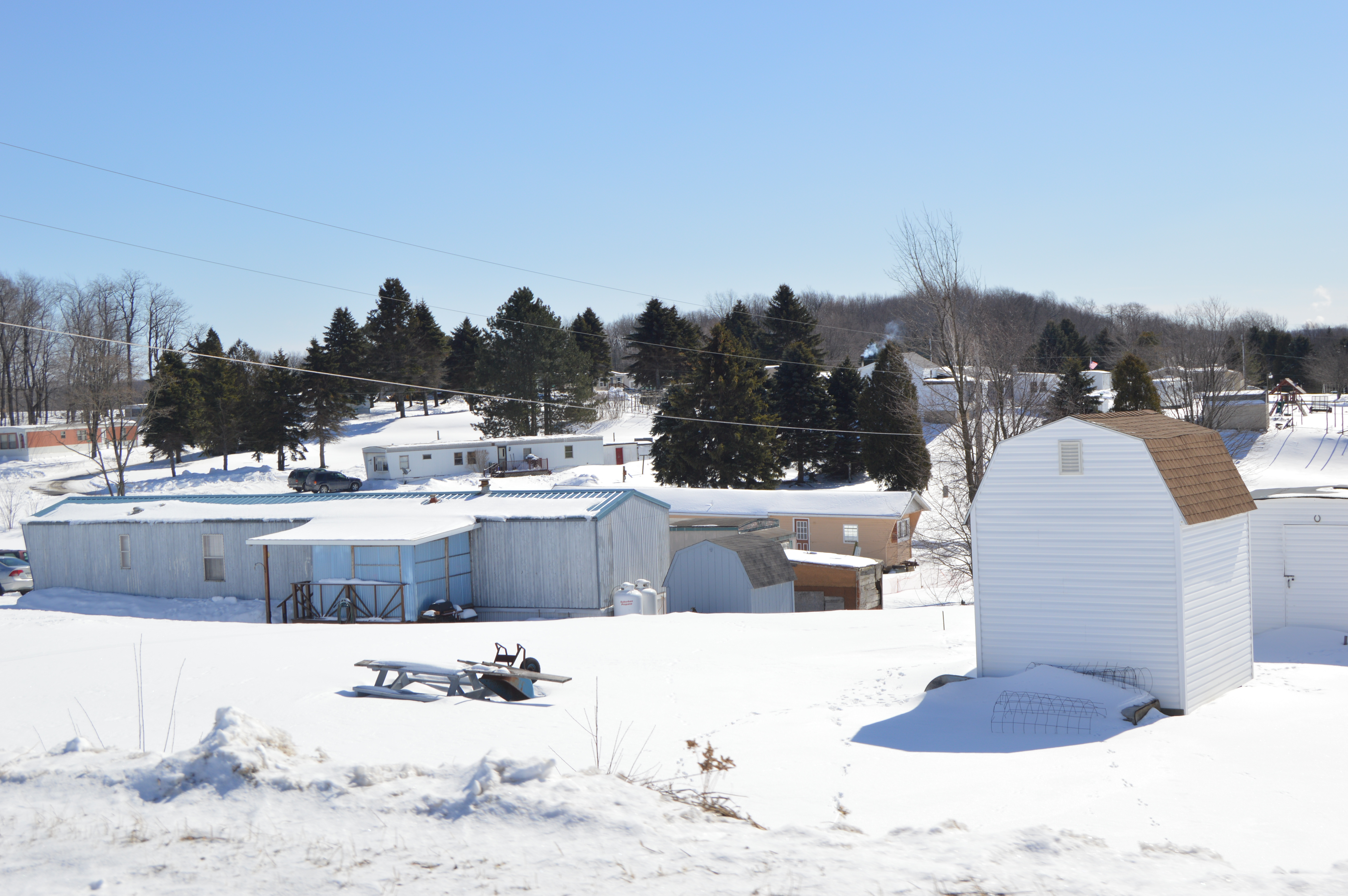
- Trailer park south of Carrolltown

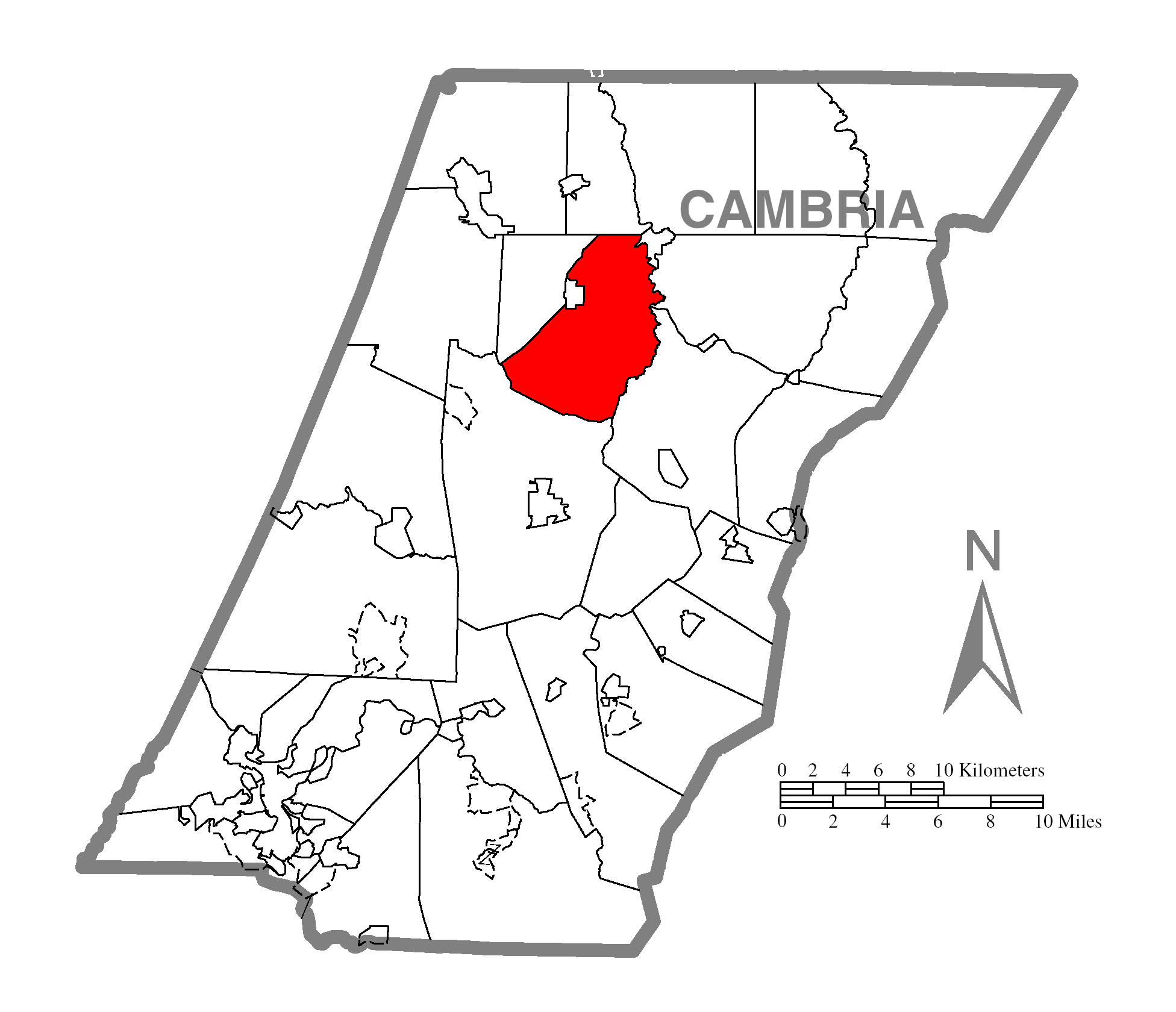
- Map of Cambria County, Pennsylvania highlighting East Carroll Township

- Map of Cambria County, Pennsylvania
- Country: United States
- State: Pennsylvania
- County: Cambria
- Incorporated: 1910

Area
  - Total: 24.93 sq mi (64.56 km^{2})
  - Land: 24.93 sq mi (64.56 km^{2})
  - Water: 0 sq mi (0.00 km^{2})

Population (2020)
  - Total: 1,425
  - Density: 57.2/sq mi (22.07/km^{2})
- Time zone: UTC-5 (Eastern (EST))
  - Summer (DST): UTC-4 (EDT)
- Area code: 814
- FIPS code: 42-021-20952
- Website: eastcarrolltwp.com

East Carroll Township is a township in Cambria County, Pennsylvania, United States. The population was 1,425 at the 2020 census, down from 1,654 at the 2010 census. It is part of the Johnstown, Pennsylvania Metropolitan Statistical Area.

== Geography ==
The township is located in north-central Cambria County at 40.57° N by 78.70° W and is approximately 8 miles (13 km) north of Ebensburg, the county seat, and 18 miles (29 km) west-northwest of the city of Altoona. The township is bordered on the east by Chest Creek, a northward-flowing tributary of the West Branch Susquehanna River. The borough of Carrolltown borders part of the township on the west, and Patton touches the northeastern corner of the township. U.S. Route 219 crosses the township from north to south, connecting Carrolltown with Ebensburg.

According to the United States Census Bureau, the township has a total area of 24.9 square miles (64.6 km^{2}), all land.

== Communities ==
=== Unincorporated communities ===
- Eckenrode Mill
- Tunnel

== Demographics ==
Historical population
Census	Pop.	Note	%±
2000	1,798		—
2010	1,654		−8.0%
2020	1,425		−13.8%
U.S. Decennial Census

At the 2000 census there were 1,798 people, 632 households, and 494 families in the township. The population density was 71.1 inhabitants per square mile (27.5/km^{2}). There were 664 housing units at an average density of 26.3 per square mile (10.2/km^{2}). The racial makeup of the township was 99.28% White, 0.06% African American, 0.11% Asian, 0.11% from other races, and 0.44% from two or more races. Hispanic or Latino of any race were 0.11%.

There were 632 households, 35.9% had children under the age of 18 living with them, 67.9% were married couples living together, 8.4% had a female householder with no husband present, and 21.8% were non-families. 19.0% of households were made up of individuals, and 9.3% were one person aged 65 or older. The average household size was 2.84 and the average family size was 3.29.

The age distribution was 25.5% under the age of 18, 9.5% from 18 to 24, 26.8% from 25 to 44, 26.6% from 45 to 64, and 11.6% 65 or older. The median age was 38 years. For every 100 females there were 98.9 males. For every 100 females age 18 and over, there were 97.1 males.

The median household income was $36,771 and the median family income was $42,273. Males had a median income of $30,302 versus $20,388 for females. The per capita income for the township was $15,100. About 8.4% of families and 9.5% of the population were below the poverty line, including 14.1% of those under age 18 and 10.9% of those age 65 or over.
