= Eduserv Foundation =

The Eduserv Foundation was a United Kingdom nonprofit educational charity that worked to realise the benefits of Information and Communications Technology (ICT) for learners, researchers and the institutions that serve them.

The Foundation operated between July 2003 until 2008, during which period it launched a number of programmes of activity including: Eduserv Research Grants; Assistive Technology Licences; Tutor Guides for Vocational Education; and Information Literacy initiatives.

The Foundation primarily funded work in the areas of:

- repositories, metadata and open access;
- access and identity management;
- service architectures;
- effective elearning.

The Foundation was part of Eduserv, which is based in Bath, UK, and which continues to carry out research and innovation projects that build on the Foundation's work and maintains CHEST agreements for software procurement.
