= Westover, Pennsylvania =

Borough in Pennsylvania, US

- Borough
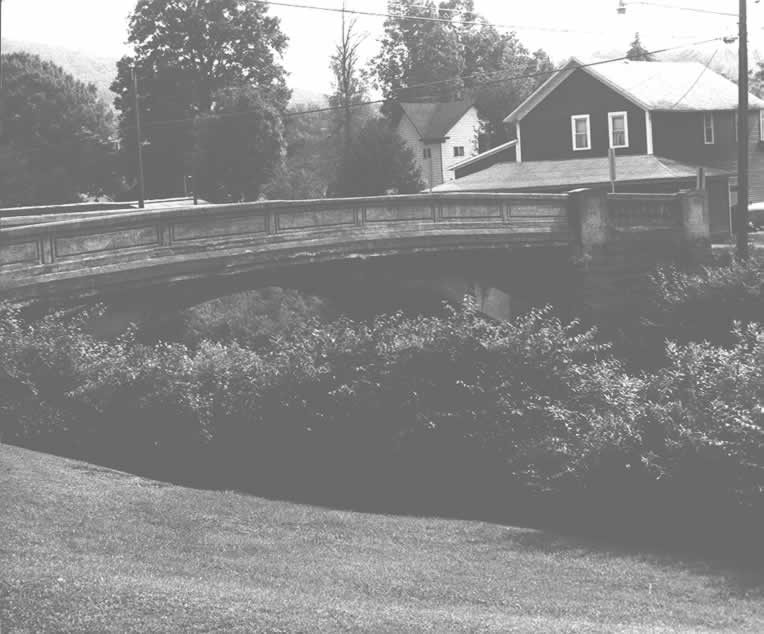
- The Bridge in Westover Borough, listed on the National Register of Historic Places

- Location of Westover in Clearfield County, Pennsylvania.

- Location of Clearfield County in Pennsylvania
- Coordinates: 40°45′04″N 78°40′20″W
- Country: United States
- State: Pennsylvania
- County: Clearfield
- Settled: 1840
- Incorporated: 1895

Government
  - Type: Borough Council

Area
  - Total: 2.75 sq mi (7.12 km^{2})
  - Land: 2.69 sq mi (6.98 km^{2})
  - Water: 0.054 sq mi (0.14 km^{2})
- Elevation: 1,380 ft (420 m)

Population (2020)
  - Total: 361
  - Estimate (2021): 356
  - Density: 139.4/sq mi (53.84/km^{2})
- Time zone: UTC-5 (Eastern (EST))
  - Summer (DST): UTC-4 (EDT)
- ZIP code: 16692
- Area code: 814
- FIPS code: 42-83736

Westover is a borough in Clearfield County, Pennsylvania, United States. The population was 361 at the 2020 census.

== Geography ==
Westover is located in southern Clearfield County at 40°45′4″N 78°40′20″W (40.751017, -78.672239), in the valley of Chest Creek, a north-flowing tributary of the West Branch Susquehanna River. The borough's southern border is the northern boundary of Cambria County. Pennsylvania Route 36 passes through the borough, leading north 7 miles (11 km) to Newburg and south 10 miles (16 km) to Patton.

According to the United States Census Bureau, Westover has a total area of 2.7 square miles (7.1 km^{2}), of which 2.7 square miles (7.0 km^{2}) is land and 0.04 square miles (0.1 km^{2}), or 1.95%, is water.

== Demographics ==
Historical population
Census	Pop.	Note	%±
1900	654		—
1910	569		−13.0%
1920	712		25.1%
1930	520		−27.0%
1940	669		28.7%
1950	605		−9.6%
1960	492		−18.7%
1970	501		1.8%
1980	517		3.2%
1990	446		−13.7%
2000	458		2.7%
2010	390		−14.8%
2020	361		−7.4%
2021 (est.)	356	▼	−1.4%

As of the census of 2000, there were 458 people, 169 households, and 123 families residing in the borough. The population density was 166.7 inhabitants per square mile (64.4/km^{2}). There were 182 housing units at an average density of 66.3 per square mile (25.6/km^{2}). The racial makeup of the borough was 98.91% White, 0.44% Asian, and 0.66% from two or more races. Hispanic or Latino of any race were 1.31% of the population.

There were 169 households, out of which 37.3% had children under the age of 18 living with them, 58.6% were married couples living together, 10.1% had a female householder with no husband present, and 27.2% were non-families. 24.9% of all households were made up of individuals, and 13.0% had someone living alone who was 65 years of age or older. The average household size was 2.71 and the average family size was 3.21.

In the borough, the population was spread out, with 29.3% under the age of 18, 6.6% from 18 to 24, 29.0% from 25 to 44, 21.0% from 45 to 64, and 14.2% who were 65 years of age or older. The median age was 35 years. For every 100 female, there were 111.1 males. For every 100 females age 18 and over, there were 101.2 males.

The median income for a household in the borough was $21,691, and the median income for a family was $26,786. Males had a median income of $27,917 versus $17,750 for females. The per capita income for the borough was $10,866. About 15.5% of families and 20.5% of the population were below the poverty line, including 22.6% of those under age 18 and 10.0% of those ages 65 or over.
