= Hastings, Pennsylvania =

Borough in Pennsylvania, US

- Borough
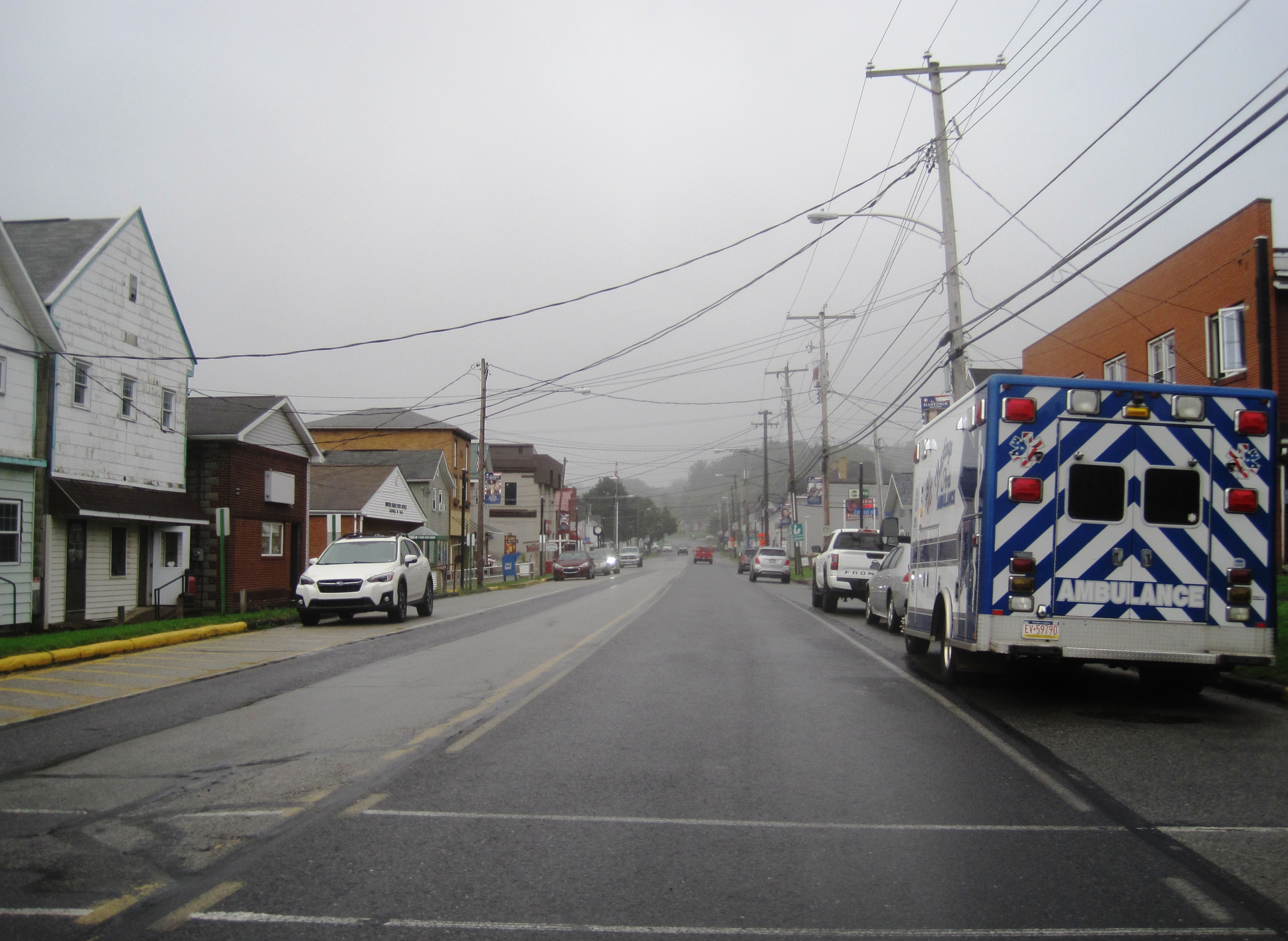
- Beaver Street in Hastings
- Motto: Always Help others
- Location of Hastings in Cambria County, Pennsylvania.

- Location within Pennsylvania
- Coordinates: 40°39′56″N 78°42′43″W
- Country: United States
- State: Pennsylvania
- County: Cambria
- Settled: 1889
- Incorporated: 1894

Government
  - Type: Borough council

Area
  - Total: 0.56 sq mi (1.46 km^{2})
  - Land: 0.56 sq mi (1.46 km^{2})
  - Water: 0 sq mi (0.00 km^{2})
- Elevation: 1,745 ft (532 m)

Population (2020)
  - Total: 1,213
  - Density: 2,154.8/sq mi (831.98/km^{2})
- Time zone: UTC-5 (Eastern (EST))
  - Summer (DST): UTC-4 (EDT)
- ZIP code: 16646
- Area code: 814
- FIPS code: 42-33080
- GNIS feature ID: 1215024
- Website: hastingsborough.com

Hastings is a borough in Cambria County, Pennsylvania, United States. It is part of the Johnstown, Pennsylvania Metropolitan Statistical Area. As of the 2020 census, Hastings had a population of 1,213.

== Geography ==
Hastings is located in northwestern Cambria County at 40°39′56″N 78°42′43″W (40.665473, -78.711903). It is in the valley of Brubaker Run, a tributary of Chest Creek, which in turn flows northward to the West Branch Susquehanna River. Hastings is 13 miles (21 km) north of Ebensburg, the Cambria County Seat, 24 miles (39 km) northwest of Altoona, and 31 miles (50 km) northeast of Johnstown.

According to the United States Census Bureau, Hastings has a total area of 0.56 square miles (1.44 km^{2}), all land.

== Demographics ==
Historical population
Census	Pop.	Note	%±
1890	1,070		—
1900	1,621		51.5%
1910	2,125		31.1%
1920	2,292		7.9%
1930	2,011		−12.3%
1940	2,105		4.7%
1950	1,846		−12.3%
1960	1,751		−5.1%
1970	1,791		2.3%
1980	1,574		−12.1%
1990	1,431		−9.1%
2000	1,398		−2.3%
2010	1,278		−8.6%
2020	1,213		−5.1%

As of the census of 2000, there were 1,398 people, 557 households, and 382 families residing in the borough. The population density was 2,484.1 inhabitants per square mile (959.1/km^{2}). There were 603 housing units at an average density of 1,071.5 per square mile (413.7/km^{2}). The racial makeup of the borough was 99.43% White, 0.07% Native American, 0.14% Asian, 0.29% from other races, and 0.07% from two or more races. Hispanic or Latino of any race were 0.64% of the population.

There were 557 households, out of which 29.1% had children under the age of 18 living with them, 51.3% were married couples living together, 13.5% had a female householder with no husband present, and 31.4% were non-families. 29.8% of all households were made up of individuals, and 17.1% had someone living alone who was 65 years of age or older. The average household size was 2.37 and the average family size was 2.92.

In the borough the population was spread out, with 21.2% under the age of 18, 8.2% from 18 to 24, 24.8% from 25 to 44, 20.7% from 45 to 64, and 25.1% who were 65 years of age or older. The median age was 42 years. For every 100 females there were 85.4 males. For every 100 females age 18 and over, there were 80.8 males.

The median income for a household in the borough was $25,192, and the median income for a family was $33,462. Males had a median income of $28,125 versus $16,786 for females. The per capita income for the borough was $13,429. About 10.4% of families and 13.1% of the population were below the poverty line, including 18.0% of those under age 18 and 10.3% of those age 65 or over.

== Notable people ==
- Edgar Cortright, former director of the NASA Langley Research Center and Chairman of the Apollo 13 Review Board, was born in Hastings.
- Fern Michaels (born Mary Ruth Kuczkir; 1933–2025) was an American author of romance and thriller novels.
