= Chest Springs, Pennsylvania =

Borough in Pennsylvania, US

- Borough
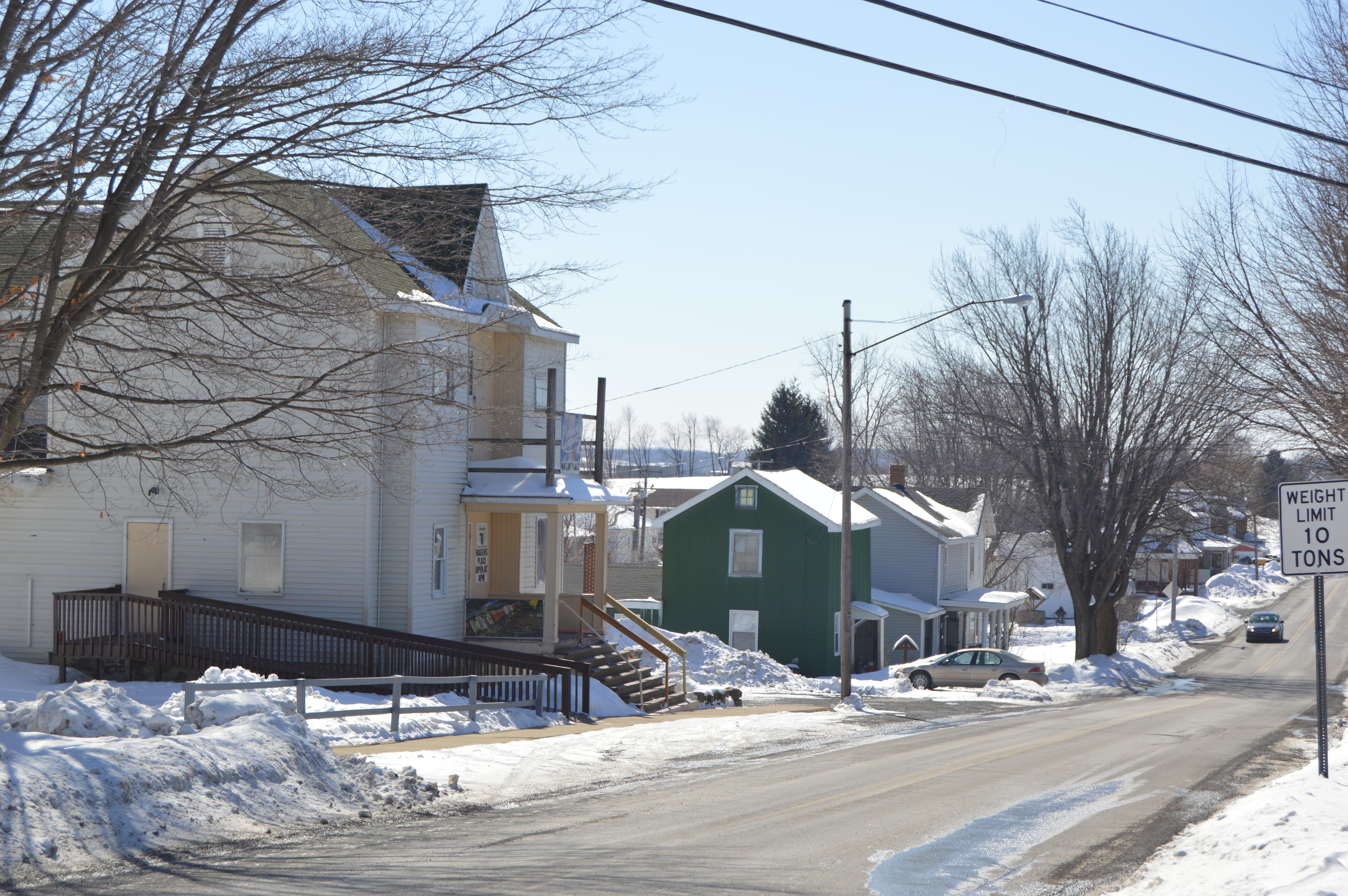
- Houses on Columbia Street

- Location of Chest Springs in Cambria County, Pennsylvania.

- Location within Pennsylvania
- Coordinates: 40°34′44″N 78°36′35″W
- Country: United States
- State: Pennsylvania
- County: Cambria
- Incorporated: 1858

Government
  - Type: Borough Council
  - Mayor: Paul Eckenrode

Area
  - Total: 0.19 sq mi (0.50 km^{2})
  - Land: 0.19 sq mi (0.50 km^{2})
  - Water: 0 sq mi (0.00 km^{2})
- Elevation: 1,942 ft (592 m)

Population (2020)
  - Total: 140
  - Density: 726.3/sq mi (280.42/km^{2})
- Time zone: UTC-5 (Eastern (EST))
  - Summer (DST): UTC-4 (EDT)
- Zip code: 16624
- Area code: 814
- FIPS code: 42-13384
- GNIS feature ID: 1215013

Chest Springs is a borough in Cambria County, Pennsylvania, United States. It is part of the Johnstown, Pennsylvania Metropolitan Statistical Area. As of the 2020 census, Chest Springs had a population of 140.

== Geography ==
Chest Springs is located in northeastern Cambria County at 40°34′44″N 78°36′35″W (40.578804, -78.609807).

According to the United States Census Bureau, the borough has a total area of 0.19 square miles (0.5 km^{2}), all land.

== Demographics ==
Historical population
Census	Pop.	Note	%±
1860	183		—
1870	269		47.0%
1880	305		13.4%
1890	255		−16.4%
1900	202		−20.8%
1910	174		−13.9%
1920	126		−27.6%
1930	161		27.8%
1940	183		13.7%
1950	232		26.8%
1960	215		−7.3%
1970	178		−17.2%
1980	198		11.2%
1990	166		−16.2%
2000	110		−33.7%
2010	149		35.5%
2020	140		−6.0%

At the 2000 census there were 110 people, 50 households, and 30 families in the borough. The population density was 476.9 inhabitants per square mile (184.1/km^{2}). There were 50 housing units at an average density of 216.8 per square mile (83.7/km^{2}). The racial makeup of the borough was 100.00% White. There were 50 households, 30.0% had children under the age of 18 living with them, 44.0% were married couples living together, 8.0% had a female householder with no husband present, and 40.0% were non-families. 36.0% of households were made up of individuals, and 18.0% were one person aged 65 or older. The average household size was 2.20 and the average family size was 2.93.

The age distribution was 23.6% under the age of 18, 8.2% from 18 to 24, 28.2% from 25 to 44, 20.9% from 45 to 64, and 19.1% 65 or older. The median age was 40 years. For every 100 females there were 100.0 males. For every 100 females age 18 and over, there were 104.9 males.

The median household income was $23,750 and the median family income was $38,750. Males had a median income of $35,000 versus $26,250 for females. The per capita income for the borough was $14,357. There were no families and 3.7% of the population living below the poverty line, including no under eighteens and 8.7% of those over 64.
