= Chest Township, Clearfield County, Pennsylvania =

Township in Pennsylvania, US

Coordinates: 40°44′40″N 78°36′59″W

- Township
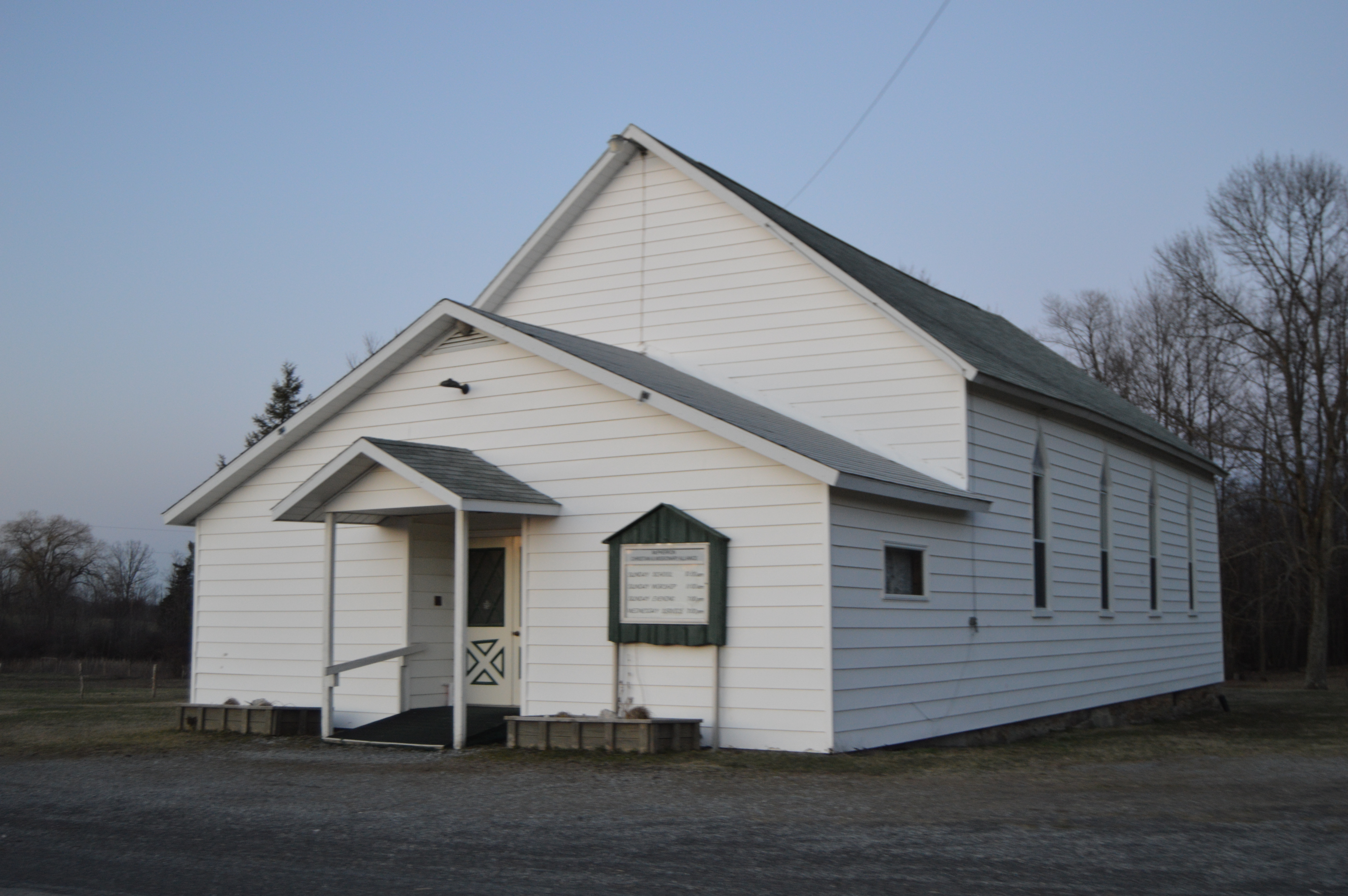
- Church at McPherron

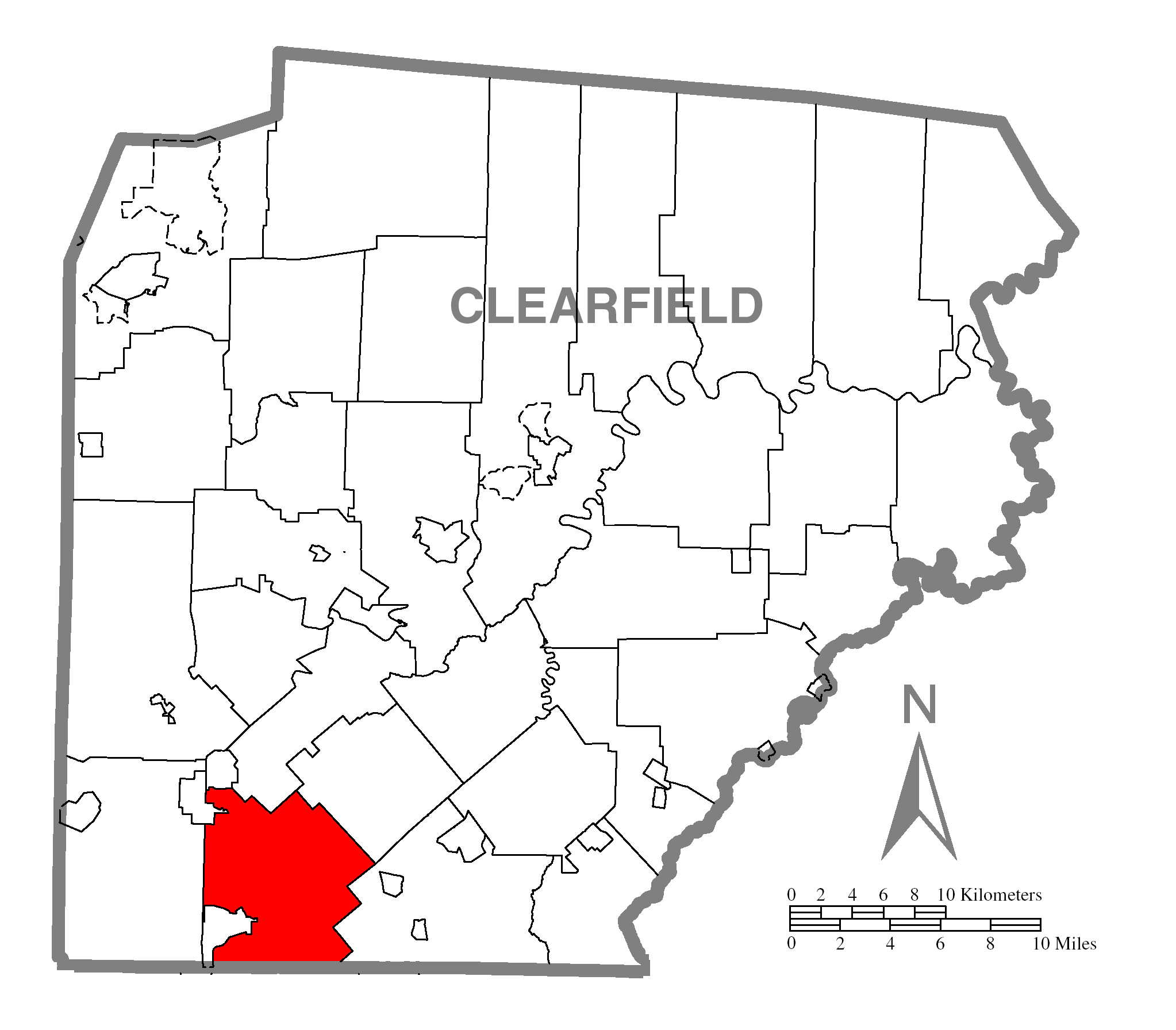
- Map of Clearfield County, Pennsylvania highlighting Chest Township

- Map of Clearfield County, Pennsylvania
- Country: United States
- State: Pennsylvania
- County: Clearfield
- Incorporated: 1826

Area
  - Total: 35.98 sq mi (93.19 km^{2})
  - Land: 35.80 sq mi (92.72 km^{2})
  - Water: 0.18 sq mi (0.46 km^{2})

Population (2020)
  - Total: 510 ▼
  - Estimate (2022): 514 ▲
  - Density: 14.1/sq mi (5.45/km^{2})
- Time zone: UTC-5 (Eastern (EST))
  - Summer (DST): UTC-4 (EDT)
- Area code: 814
- FIPS code: 42-033-13200

Chest Township is a township in Clearfield County, Pennsylvania, United States. The population was 510 at the 2020 census.

== Geography ==
According to the United States Census Bureau, the township has a total area of 35.8 square miles (93 km^{2}), all land.

== Communities ==
- Five Points
- La Jose
- McPherron
- Thompsontown
- Waukesha

== Demographics ==
Historical population
Census	Pop.	Note	%±
1970	469		—
1980	611		30.3%
1990	565		−7.5%
2000	547		−3.2%
2010	515		−5.9%
2020	510		−1.0%
2022 (est.)	514		0.8%
U.S. Decennial Census

At the 2000 census there were 547 people, 188 households, and 150 families in the township. The population density was 15.3 people per square mile (5.9/km^{2}). There were 252 housing units at an average density of 7.0/sq mi (2.7/km^{2}). The racial makeup of the township was 99.27% White, 0.18% African American, and 0.55% from two or more races. There were 188 households, 34.0% had children under the age of 18 living with them, 66.5% were married couples living together, 9.6% had a female householder with no husband present, and 19.7% were non-families. 16.0% of households were made up of individuals, and 7.4% were one person aged 65 or older. The average household size was 2.88 and the average family size was 3.21.

The age distribution was 25.0% under the age of 18, 10.2% from 18 to 24, 25.4% from 25 to 44, 26.5% from 45 to 64, and 12.8% 65 or older. The median age was 38 years. For every 100 females there were 102.6 males. For every 100 females age 18 and over, there were 97.1 males.

The median household income was $26,442 and the median family income was $27,500. Males had a median income of $24,500 versus $14,464 for females. The per capita income for the township was $10,760. About 18.5% of families and 23.2% of the population were below the poverty line, including 41.6% of those under age 18 and 9.1% of those age 65 or over.

== Education ==
Students in Chest Township attend schools in the Harmony Area School District and Purchase Line School District.
