= Flinton, Pennsylvania =

Unincorporated community in Pennsylvania, US

- Unincorporated community
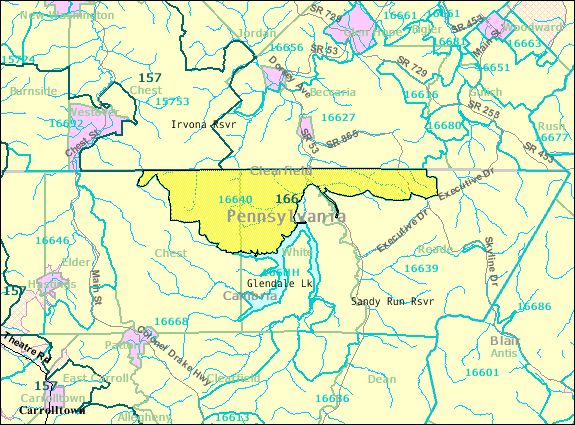
- Flinton ZIP code area (16640) in Cambria County

- Location of Cambria County in Pennsylvania

- Location in Pennsylvania
- Coordinates: 40°42′50.4″N 78°31′4.80″W
- Country: United States
- State: Pennsylvania
- County: Cambria
- Township: Reade
- Elevation: 1,460 ft (450 m)

Population
  - Estimate (2023): 181
- Time zone: UTC-5 (Eastern (EST))
  - Summer (DST): UTC-4 (EDT)
- ZIP code: 16640
- Area code: 814
- GNIS feature ID: 2830790

Flinton is a village and an unincorporated community in Cambria County, Pennsylvania, United States. Flinton has a post office with ZIP code 16640.

== Geography ==
Flinton is located in the northwestern part of Reade Township at 40°42′50″N 78°31′05″W on the east side of Clearfield Creek, a northward-flowing tributary of the West Branch Susquehanna River.

It has an elevation of 1,460 feet (450 m) above sea level.

== Demographics ==
Historical population
Census	Pop.	Note	%±
2023 (est.)	181

The United States Census Bureau defined Flinton as a census designated place (CDP) in 2023.
