= Chest Township, Cambria County, Pennsylvania =

Township in Pennsylvania, US

Coordinates: 40°41′24″N 78°37′40″W

- Township
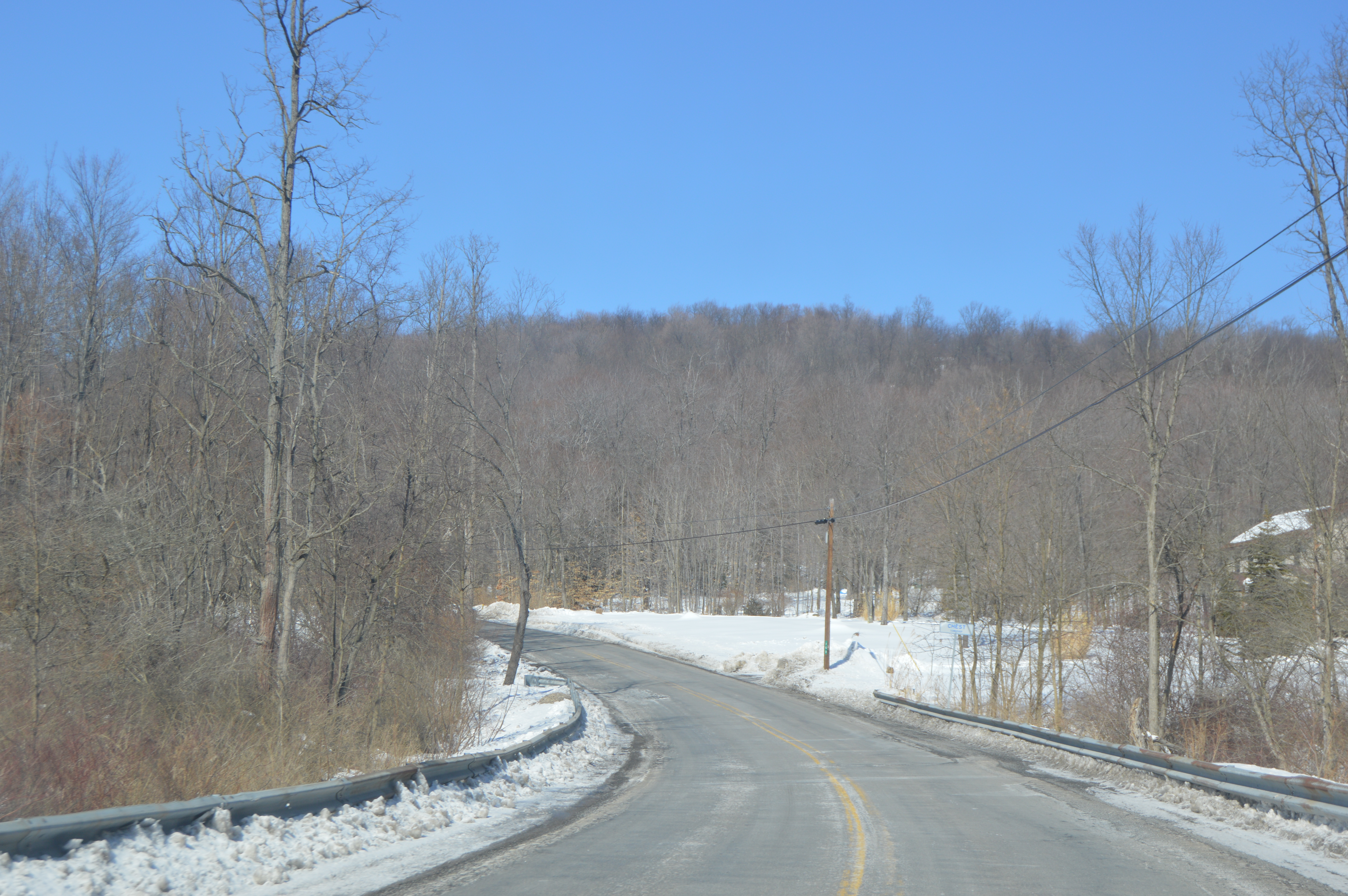
- Countryside north of Patton

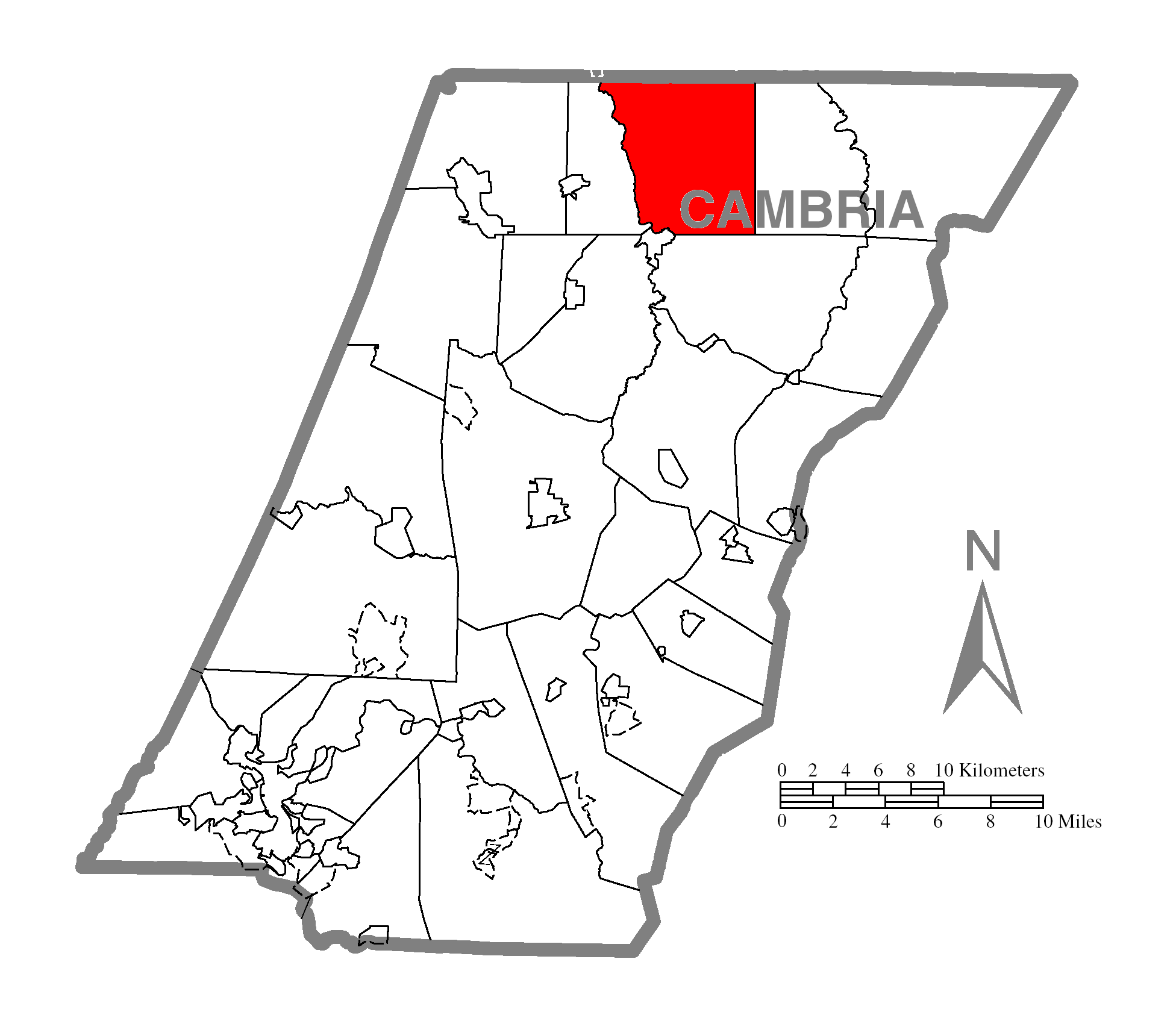
- Map of Cambria County, Pennsylvania highlighting Chest Township

- Map of Cambria County, Pennsylvania
- Country: United States
- State: Pennsylvania
- County: Cambria
- Incorporated: 1853

Area
  - Total: 29.16 sq mi (75.53 km^{2})
  - Land: 29.12 sq mi (75.43 km^{2})
  - Water: 0.039 sq mi (0.10 km^{2})

Population (2020)
  - Total: 458 ▲
  - Estimate (2021): 455
  - Density: 11.9/sq mi (4.61/km^{2})
- Time zone: UTC-5 (Eastern (EST))
  - Summer (DST): UTC-4 (EDT)
- Area code: 814
- FIPS code: 42-021-13192
- Website: chesttwp.com

Chest Township is a township in Cambria County, Pennsylvania, United States. The population was 458 at the 2020 census. It is part of the Johnstown, Pennsylvania Metropolitan Statistical Area.

== Geography ==
Chest Township is located along the northern edge of Cambria County at 40.515887,-78.744507. It is bordered to the north by Clearfield County. The borough of Patton touches the southwestern corner of the township. Chest Creek, a northward-flowing tributary of the West Branch Susquehanna River, forms the western boundary of the township.

According to the United States Census Bureau, Chest Township has a total area of 29.2 square miles (75.5 km^{2}), of which 29.1 square miles (75.4 km^{2}) is land and 0.04 square miles (0.1 km^{2}), or 0.14%, is water.

== Communities ==
=== Unincorporated community ===
- Saint Lawrence

== Demographics ==
Historical population
Census	Pop.	Note	%±
2000	346		—
2010	349		0.9%
2020	458		31.2%
2021 (est.)	455		−0.7%
U.S. Decennial Census

As of the census of 2000, there were 346 people, 119 households, and 98 families residing in the township. The population density was 11.8 people per square mile (4.6/km^{2}). There were 144 housing units at an average density of 4.9/sq mi (1.9/km^{2}). The racial makeup of the township was 98.27% White, 0.29% African American, 0.29% Native American, and 1.16% from two or more races.

There were 119 households, out of which 35.3% had children under the age of 18 living with them, 68.9% were married couples living together, 10.9% had a female householder with no husband present, and 17.6% were non-families. 12.6% of all households were made up of individuals, and 7.6% had someone living alone who was 65 years of age or older. The average household size was 2.91 and the average family size was 3.13.

In the township the population was spread out, with 22.8% under the age of 18, 10.7% from 18 to 24, 25.4% from 25 to 44, 24.3% from 45 to 64, and 16.8% who were 65 years of age or older. The median age was 40 years. For every 100 females there were 109.7 males. For every 100 females age 18 and over, there were 96.3 males.

The median income for a household in the township was $46,786, and the median income for a family was $49,750. Males had a median income of $37,857 versus $27,500 for females. The per capita income for the township was $15,276. About 5.6% of families and 7.2% of the population were below the poverty line, including none of those under age 18 and 5.6% of those age 65 or over.

== Recreation ==
Portions of the Prince Gallitzin State Park and Pennsylvania State Game Lands Number 108 are located at the eastern end of the township.
