= White Township, Pennsylvania =

White Township is the name of some places in the U.S. state of Pennsylvania:

- White Township, Beaver County, Pennsylvania
- White Township, Cambria County, Pennsylvania
- White Township, Indiana County, Pennsylvania

See also:

- White Deer Township, Pennsylvania
- Whitehall Township, Pennsylvania
- Whiteley Township, Pennsylvania
- Whitemarsh Township, Pennsylvania
- Whitpain Township, Pennsylvania
