= Demetrius Augustine Gallitzin =

Russian aristocrat and Catholic priest

Servant of God Demetrius Augustine Gallitzin
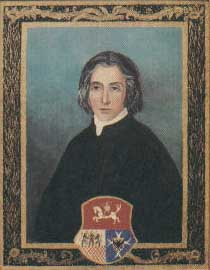
- Born: 22 December 1770; The Hague, South Holland, Netherlands
- Died: 6 May 1840 (aged 69); Loretto, Pennsylvania, United States

Demetrius Augustine Gallitzin (Russian: Дими́трий Дими́триевич Голи́цын, romanized: Dimitry Dimitrievich Golitsyn, December 22, 1770 – May 6, 1840) was an emigre Russian aristocrat and Catholic priest known as "The Apostle of the Alleghenies" and also in the United States as Prince Gallitzin. He was a member of the House of Golitsyn.

Since 2005, he has been under consideration for beatification by the Catholic Church; he was thus titled a Servant of God.

== Early life ==
Gallitzin was born into nobility on December 22, 1770 at The Hague. His father, Prince Dimitri Alexeievich, the Russian ambassador to the Netherlands, was an intimate friend of Voltaire and a follower of Diderot. His mother was the Prussian Countess Adelheid Amalie von Schmettau, the daughter of Field Marshall Samuel von Schmettau.

When Prince Demitri was about two years old, the Empress Catherine the Great visited The Hague, and as a sign of special favor to his father, cradled the child in her arms and appointed the boy an officer of the guard. He was raised as a nominal member of the Russian Orthodox Church, although his father, like many Russian aristocrats of his age, had little connection to or fondness for religion. As was fashionable at the time, the household's language was French, which was Prince Dmitri's native tongue.

In his youth, his most constant companion was William Frederick, son of William V, then reigning Stadtholder of the Netherlands. This friendship continued even after William became King of the Netherlands and Duke of Luxemburg as William I. Each summer, his mother would take Dimitri and his sister traveling to the principal cities of Germany, explaining to them important geographical or historical features. Demetri was, by nature, rather reserved and timid. His sister made friends more readily, but Dimitri kept them longer.

After his mother's return to Catholicism in 1786, he was greatly influenced by her circle of intellectuals, priests, and aristocrats. At the age of 17, Prince Dimitri was formally received into the Catholic Church. To please his mother, whose birth (1748) and marriage (1768), occurred on 28 August, the feast of Saint Augustine, he assumed at the confirmation that name, and after that wrote his name Demetrius Augustine. A first cousin, Yelizaveta Golitsyna, would also eventually convert and join the Society of the Sacred Heart, founding several religious houses in the United States.

His father, who had been planning a military career for him, was quite unhappy with the change and was barely dissuaded from sending his son to Saint Petersburg, where he hoped a stint in a Russian Guards Regiment would force his son back into Orthodoxy. In 1792, his son was appointed aide-de-camp to General von Lillien, the commander of the Austrian troops in the Duchy of Brabant; but, after the death of Leopold II of Austria and the murder of King Gustav III of Sweden, Prince Dimitri, like all other foreigners, was dismissed from Austrian Service.

== America ==
As was the custom among young aristocrats at the time, he then set out to complete his education by travel. As the French Revolution had made European tours unsafe, his parents resolved that he should spend two years traveling through America, the West Indies, and other foreign lands. His mother provided him with letters of introduction from the prince-bishops of Hildesheim and Paderborn to Bishop John Carroll of Baltimore. With his tutor, Father Brosius, afterward a prominent missionary in the United States, he embarked from Rotterdam on August 18, 1792, and landed in Baltimore, October 28. To avoid the inconvenience and expense of traveling as a Russian prince, he assumed the name of Augustine Schmettau. This name then became Schmet or Smith, and he was known as Augustine Smith for many years after.

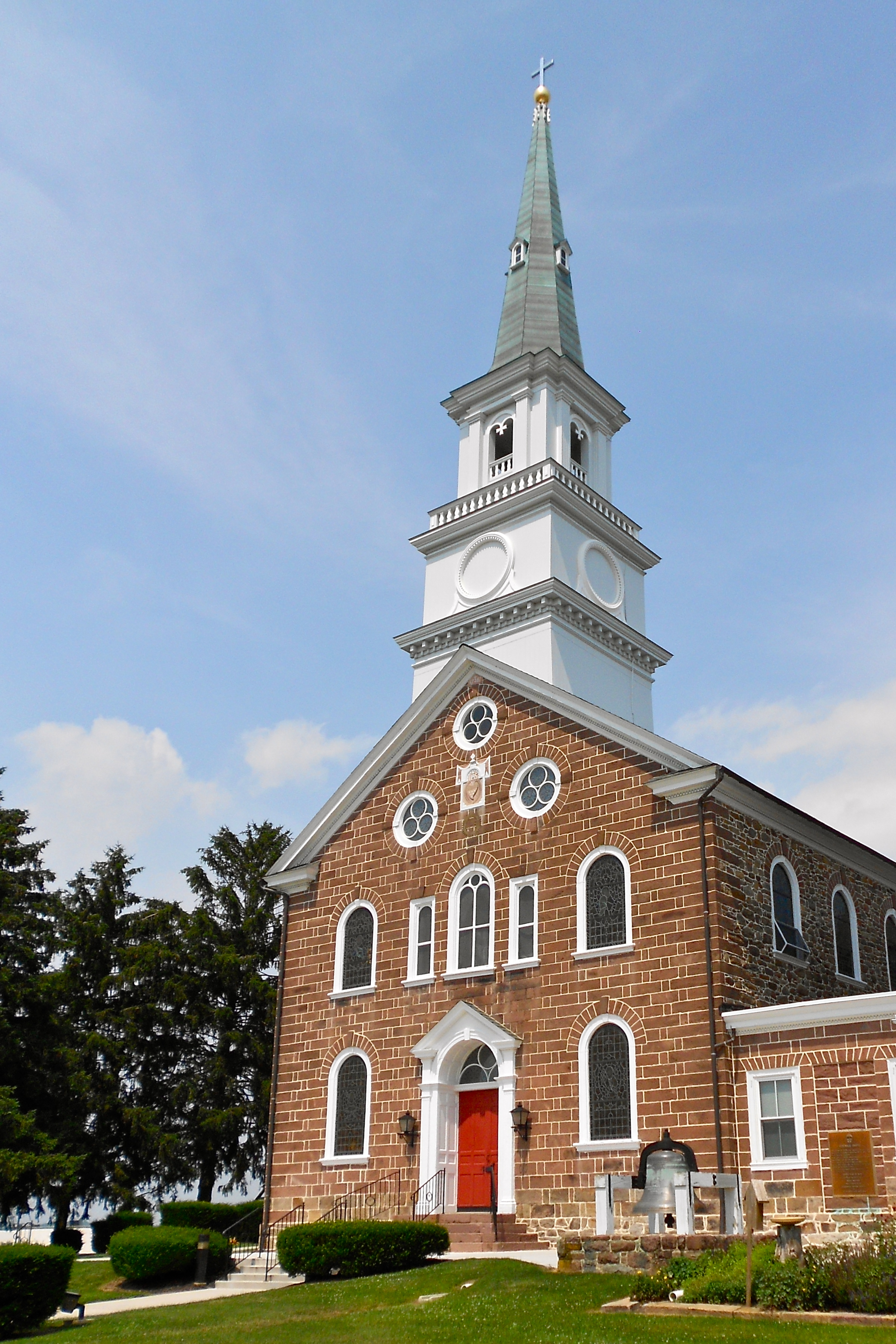
Conewago Chapel, Adams Co. PA

Not long after his arrival, he became interested in the Church's needs in the United States. To the shock and horror of his father, Prince Dimitri decided to join the priesthood and offered to forgo his inheritance. The Ambassador subsequently persuaded Catherine the Great to award his son a commission in one of the Palace Guards Regiments and formally summoned him to active duty in St. Petersburg.

Demetrius Augustine Gallitzin entered the newly established Seminary of St. Sulpice in Baltimore on November 5, 1792. Father Gallitzin was ordained on March 18, 1795, by Archbishop Carroll. Gallitzin was the first to make all his theological studies in the United States. Gallitzin then was sent to work in a church mission at Port Tobacco, Maryland, whence he was soon transferred to the Conewago district where he served at Conewago Chapel until 1799. His missionary territory extended from Taneytown, Maryland to Martinsburg, then in Virginia, and Chambersburg, Pennsylvania. In 1794, Gallitzin traveled to Middleway, West Virginia, near Martinsburg to accompany Father Dennis Cahill in the investigation of a haunted-house phenomenon known locally as the Wizard Clip. Gallitzin wrote of this experience much later, around 1839.

== Missionary ==
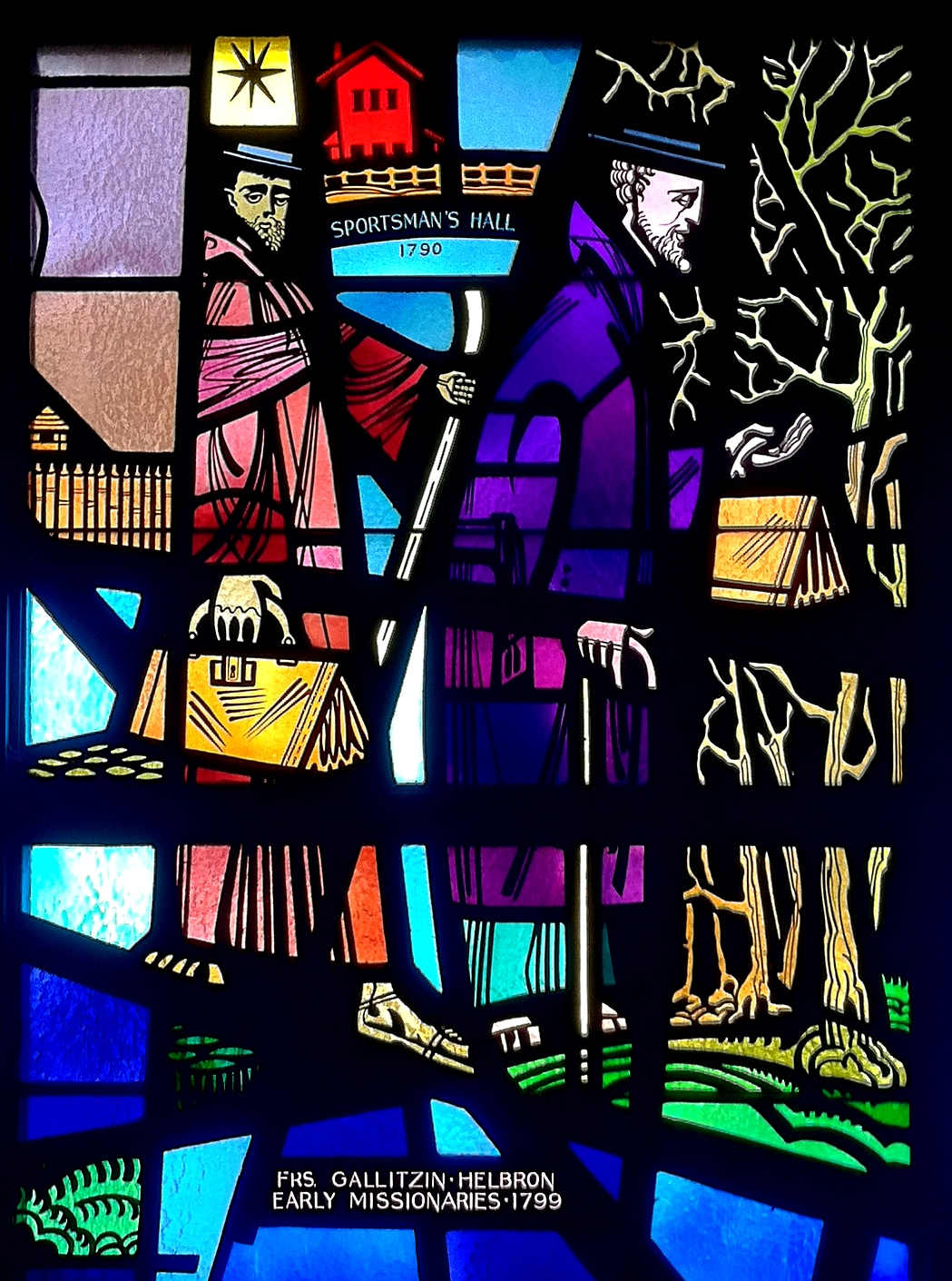
Stained-glass depiction of Father Demetrius Gallitzin and Father Peter Helbron, St. Patrick Church, Canonsburg, Pennsylvania

In the Allegheny Mountains, in 1799, Gallitzin founded the settlement of Loretto, Pennsylvania in what is now Cambria County, Pennsylvania. In turn, Loretto was an expansion upon a small clearing, "the McGuire Settlement," established by Captain Michael McGuire in 1788. McGuire, who died in 1793, bequeathed 400 acres (160 ha) in trust to Bishop Carroll to launch a full Catholic community with resident clergy. Gallitzin's military training had taught him engineering fundamentals, and in 1816 he marked out Loretto on the southern slope of a pleasant hillside. He named the town after the place of Marian devotion in Italy.

With Gallitzin in the lead, Loretto became the first English-speaking Catholic settlement in the United States west of the Allegheny Front. Gallitzin dedicated Loretto's parish church to the honor of St. Michael the Archangel, both as a nod to Gallitzin's Russian roots and, indirectly, to Michael McGuire. For several years St. Michael's Church was the only Catholic Church between Lancaster, Pennsylvania, and St. Louis, Missouri. The church today is known as the Basilica of St. Michael the Archangel.

In 1802, Gallitzin became a naturalized citizen of the United States under the name Augustine Smith. Seven years after he was naturalized and became a citizen of the United States, an Act passed by the General Assembly of Pennsylvania authorized him to establish his name, Demetrius Augustine Gallitzin, and to enjoy all of the benefits accruing to him under the name Augustine Smith.

== In the Alleghenies ==
It was a 150-mile (240 km) sick-call that first brought Father Gallitzin to "the McGuire settlement." After he was established in Loretto, if a sick-call was within a few miles of wherever he was staying, he traveled on foot. For the last four years of his life, he traveled by sled because a fall prevented him from riding horseback. When Gallitzin first started, there were few families, and those were widely scattered. He bought land to attract other Catholic settlers. Gallitzin is believed to have spent $150,000 (USD) of his funds to purchase some additional 20,000 acres (81 km^{2}) which he gave or sold at low prices to newly arriving Catholic settlers. Traveling from one valley to the next, he was often away for over a week, sleeping on bare floors. For most of his time in the mountains, he worked alone and was relatively isolated. In September 1807, he wrote to Bishop Carroll:

...I am hardly recovered from a severe spell of sickness which attacked me in Greensburgh and which has left me so weak I can scarcely crawl about... My constitution being weak, and my heart perhaps too susceptible of deep impressions from disappointments, losses, &c., I have been wonderfully low this great while, ...I can better feel than describe the gloomy and melancholy state of my mind, especially since the death of my mother. ...my own solitary situation in the wilderness of the Allegheny, my sufferings and persecutions here, conspire to overwhelm me with sorrow and melancholy. ...for God's sake, send me a companion, a priest, to help and assist me, -a friend to help me bear the burden.

== Lost inheritance ==
Over the years, Gallitzin had received some money from his mother, Princess Gallitzin. From time to time, he borrowed against his expected inheritance. Upon his father's death, Father Gallitzin, as a Catholic priest, was not allowed, according to Russian law, to receive the estate from his father. His representatives in Europe assured him this was not an insurmountable problem, and his sister Maria Anna had pledged to see that he received his share. However, circumstances changed when her subsequent marriage to an insolvent German prince absorbed most of the estate, although he did receive periodic remittances from her. William I of the Netherlands was persuaded to purchase some valuable items from Princess Gallitzin's estate with the understanding that the proceeds were to be sent to his old friend. However, the funds were delivered to Gallitzin's brother-in-law, and he saw little of it. His sister bequeathed him an annual stipend, but he saw little of that either. Gallitzin was often encouraged to return to Europe to claim his rights. Still, as he was reluctant to abandon his flock, he left the matter in the hands of his representatives, who were sometimes less than assiduous.

He soon found himself deeply in debt. Besides land, he had provided his parishioners with a grist mill and sawmill to help the community prosper. He obtained a loan from Charles Carroll. Cardinal Cappellari, afterward Pope Gregory XVI, donated two hundred dollars. The Russian ambassador to the United States loaned him $5,000 and then used the promissory note to light his cigar. Later when Gallitzin was suggested for the see of Philadelphia in 1814, Bishop Carroll objected. Carroll agreed that Gallitzin's debts had been contracted for excellent and charitable purposes. Still, it was not clear Gallitzin had the financial acumen to run a diocese as important as Philadelphia, Carroll believed. In 1815, Gallitzin was suggested for the bishopric of Bardstown, Kentucky, and in 1827 for the proposed see of Pittsburgh. Gallitzin resisted proposals to nominate him the first bishop of Cincinnati and the first bishop of Detroit, but he did accept appointment as Vicar-General for Western Pennsylvania. By the end of his life, he had eradicated the debts incurred in building the community.

== Writings ==
Notwithstanding his various duties, Father Gallitzin found time to publish several tracts in defense of Catholicism. He was provoked to respond to a sermon delivered on Thanksgiving Day 1814, in Huntingdon, Pennsylvania, by a particular minister who went out of his way to attack what he called "popery." Father Gallitzin first published his Defense of Catholic Principles, which ran through several editions. This was followed by A Letter on the Holy Scriptures and An Appeal to the Protestant Public.

=== Quotes ===
Whatever differences on points of doctrine may exist amongst the different denominations of Christians, all should be united in the bonds of charity, all should pray for one another, all should be willing to assist one another; and, where we are compelled to disapprove of our neighbor's doctrine, let our disapprobation fall upon his doctrine only, not upon his person.

== Death ==
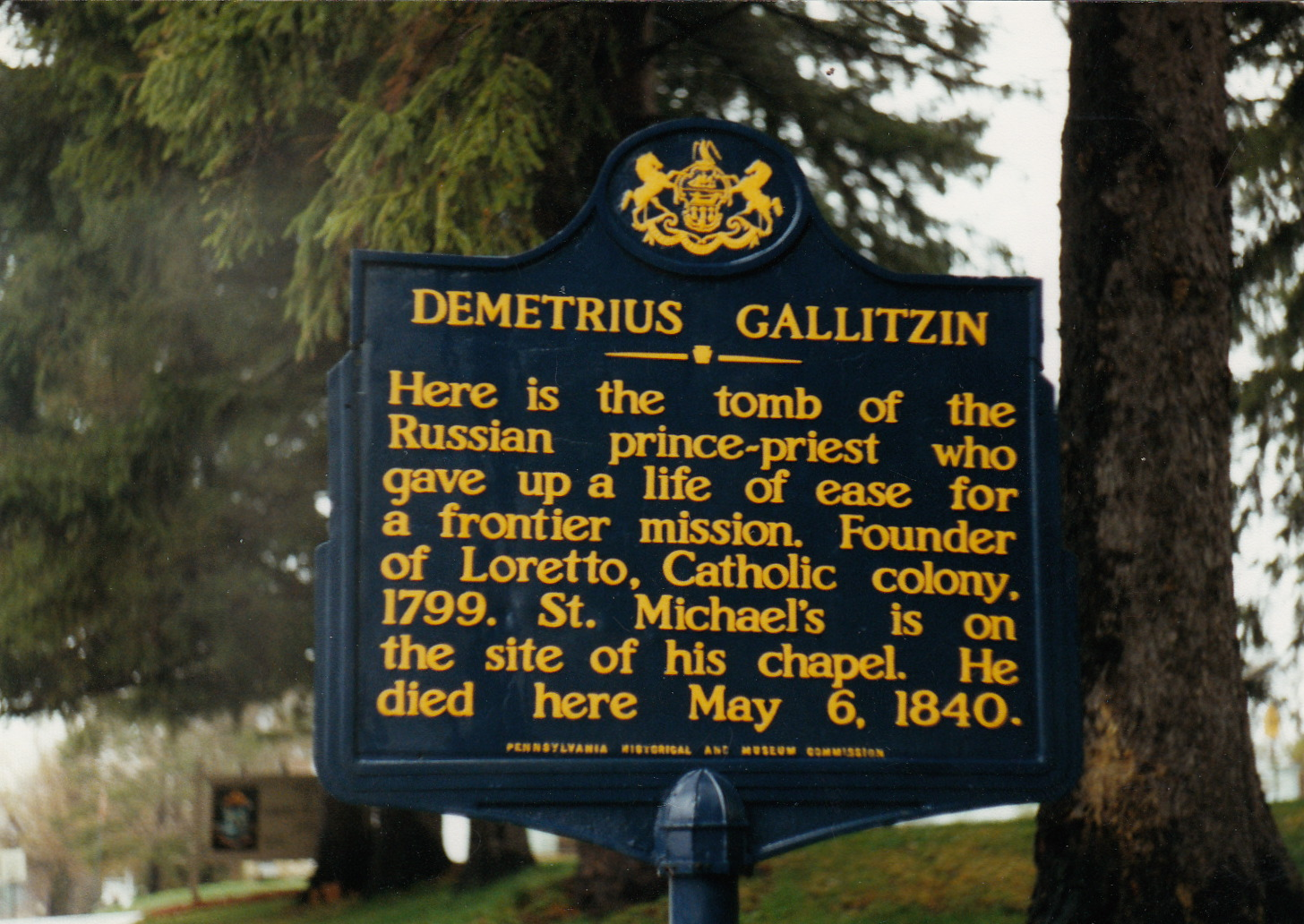
Demitrius Gallitzin marker

For 41 years, Gallitzin traveled the Allegheny Mountains, often in challenging conditions, preaching, teaching, serving, praying, and offering the sacraments. A doctor had recommended bed rest and warmth for the exhausted priest, but he was reluctant to curtail any Lenten or Holy Week services. Father Gallitzin ministered faithfully until the very end of his life, and after a brief illness, died at Loretto on May 6, 1840, shortly after Easter. He was buried near St. Michael's church in Loretto.

== Family ==
In 1805, Gallitzin was appointed by the Orphan's Court of Somerset County, Pennsylvania to be the legal guardian of six "minor children of Francis McConnell, dec'd". They ranged in age from two years to "between ten and eleven," and were named beneficiaries in his will.

== Legacy ==
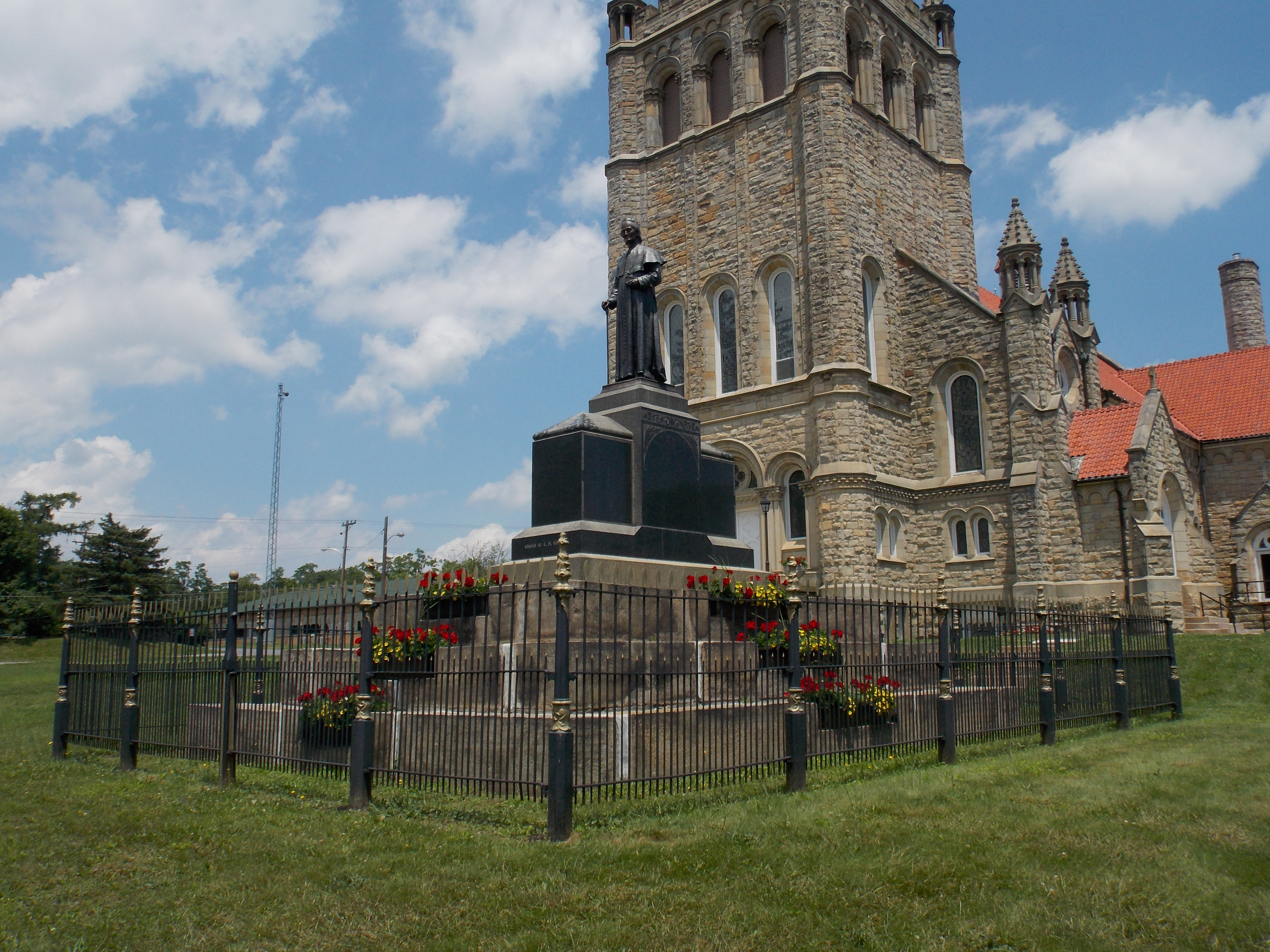
Grave on the property of the Basilica of St. Michael the Archangel in Loretto

Gallitzin's part in building up the Catholic church in western Pennsylvania cannot be overestimated; it is said that at his death, there were 10,000 Catholics in the district where forty years before he had found a scant dozen. Loretto today is in the Diocese of Altoona-Johnstown.

In 1899-1901, the steel industrialist Charles M. Schwab funded the construction of a large stone church, the current basilica, at Prince Gallitzin's tomb. Schwab also provided funds for a bronze statue of Gallitzin.

The nearby town of Gallitzin, Pennsylvania, is named for western Pennsylvania's first English-speaking Catholic priest. In this town, the Pennsylvania Railroad would tunnel through the summit of the Allegheny Mountains. Eventually, the railroad would operate three tunnels through the ridge into Gallitzin. The Gallitzin Tunnel was closed as part of Conrail's massive double-stack clearance project in the 1990s. In the mid-1960s, Pennsylvania christened a new nearby state park in honor of Prince Gallitzin, as he is called locally.

In 1916 Pennsylvania established the Gallitzin Forest District - which is a separate entity and location from Gallitzin State Park and is now known as Gallitzin State Forest.

In 1990, Bishop Joseph V. Adamec, Bishop-Emeritus of the Diocese of Altoona-Johnstown, established the Prince Gallitzin Cross Award, which is given annually to Catholics in the Diocese of Altoona-Johnstown who exemplify the evangelizing spirit of the Prince-Priest, Demetrius Gallitzin.

On June 6, 2005, it was announced that Gallitzin had been named a Servant of God by the Congregation for the Causes of Saints, the first step on the path toward a possible future sainthood.

== See also ==
- Yelizaveta Golitsyna, first cousin
