= Dennis Cahill =

Irish priest working in the US, late 1700s

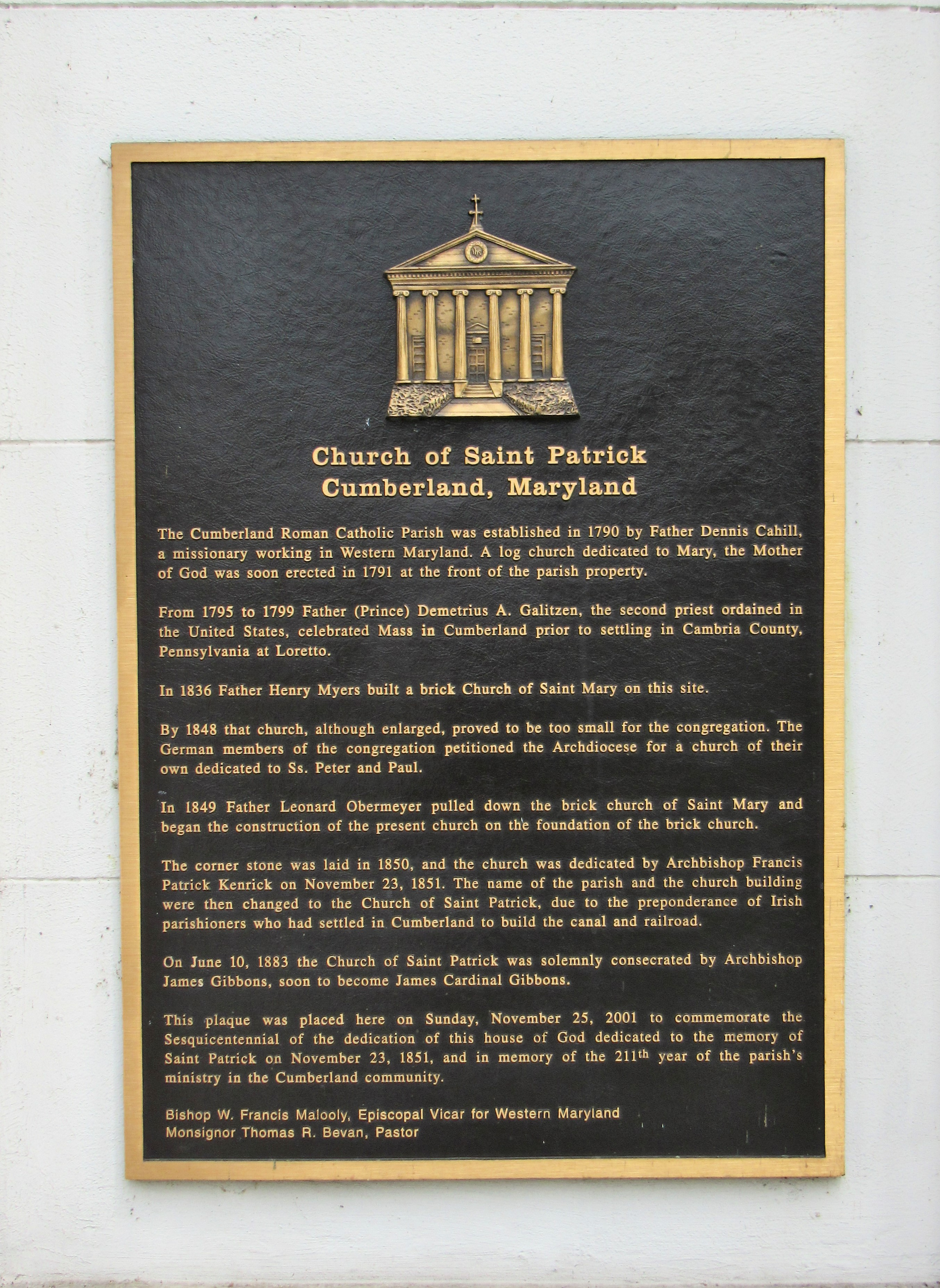
Saint Patrick's Church - Cumberland, Maryland

Dennis Cahill was an Irish missionary priest working in western Maryland, USA, in the late 18th-century, where he founded several Catholic parishes in the Potomac River valley area.

== History ==
Cahill was involved in the founding of several Catholic parishes in the Potomac River region. He was probably initially based at the Conewago Chapel. In 1786, he served Catholics in the area of Chambersburg, Pennsylvania, where, in 1792, a log structure was built called "Christ's Church". Cahill was an acquaintance of another missionary, Demetrius Augustine Gallitzin.

In 1790, he attended Catholics settled in and around Cumberland, Maryland, and celebrated the first Catholic mass in Allegany County. In the following year, a log chapel was constructed dedicated to Mary, the mother of God. This was later replaced by a larger church dedicated to St. Patrick.

Cahill had charge of the mission at St. Mary's in Elizabethtown (later known as Hagerstown) from 1790 to 1806. St. Patrick's in Little Orleans was a station of the Hagerstown mission.

In 1806, Cahill returned to Ireland, where he died in 1817.

Cahill is known for his role in the legend of the Wizard Clip.
