= Middleway Historic District =

Historic district in West Virginia, United States

- U.S. National Register of Historic Places
- U.S. Historic district
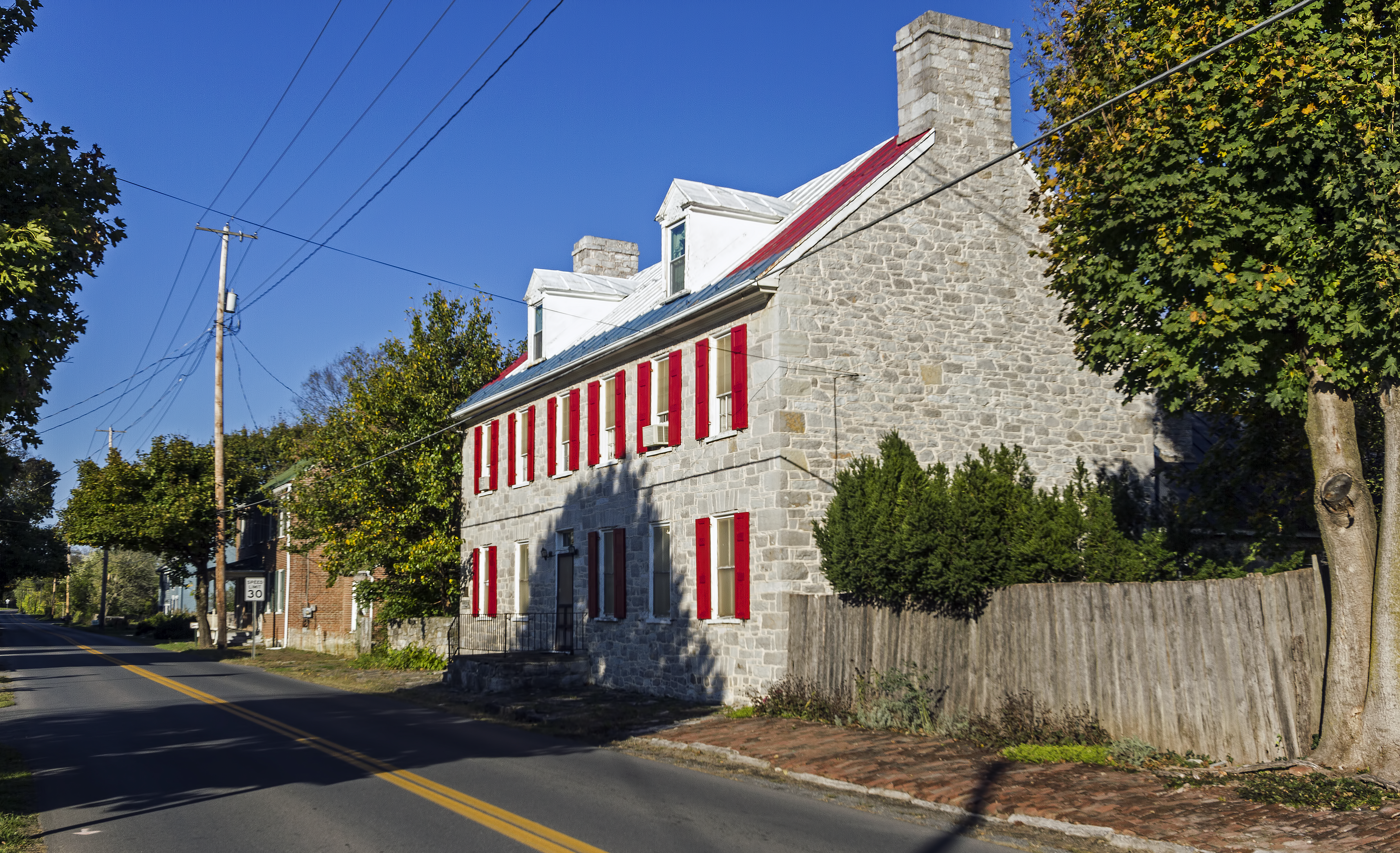

- Location within West Virginia Location within the United States
- Location: Middleway, West Virginia
- Coordinates: 39°18′13″N 77°58′58″W
- NRHP reference No.: 80004025
- Added to NRHP: March 13, 1980

The Middleway Historic District comprises sixty major buildings from the late 18th century and early 19th century in Middleway, West Virginia. Middleway was a crossroads town on the Shepherdstown-Berryville road and the Charles Town turnpike. The town was established by John Smith, Sr. and Jr., along with son and brother Rees Smith, who had established grist and hemp mills by 1734 along Turkey Run. The town was not, however, officially established until 1798. The town never followed up on its original growth, allowing the older stone, brick and log houses to be preserved.
