= Prince Gallitzin State Park =

State park in Pennsylvania, United States

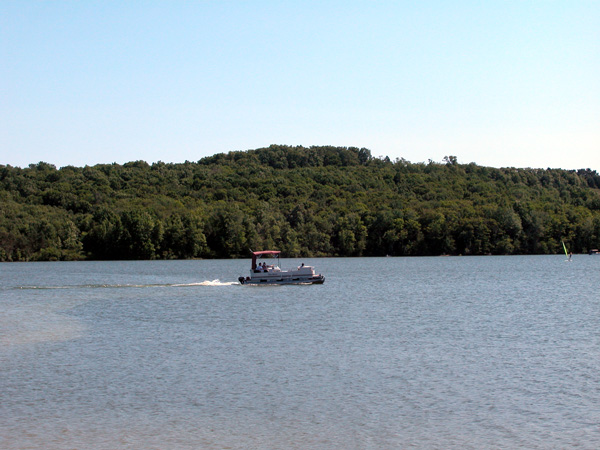

- Location within Pennsylvania Location within the United States
- Interactive map of Prince Gallitzin State Park
- Location: Cambria County, Pennsylvania, United States
- Coordinates: 40°39′04″N 78°33′19″W
- Area: 6,466.98 acres (2,617.09 ha)
- Elevation: 1,539 feet (469 m)
- Established: 1965
- Administrator: Pennsylvania Department of Conservation and Natural Resources
- Named for: Demetrius Gallitzin
- Website: Official website
- Pennsylvania State Parks

Prince Gallitzin State Park is a 6,467-acre (2,617 ha) Pennsylvania state park with acreage in both Chest and White Townships in Cambria County of West Central Pennsylvania in the United States, near both Gallitzin Borough, & Gallitzin Township in the greater Altoona, Pennsylvania area.

The park is home to Glendale Lake a 1,635 acres (662 ha) man-made lake. It has a large campground with campsites on the lake shore. Prince Gallitzin State Park was named in honor of Prince Demetrius Gallitzin, a Russian nobleman turned Catholic missionary priest who founded the nearby town of Loretto. The park is just off Pennsylvania Routes 253 and 53 just east of Patton.

== History ==
=== Namesake ===
Demetris Gallitzin was born on December 22, 1770, at The Hague in the Netherlands. His name is a form of Galitzine, the Russian princely family in which he was born. His father, Dimitri Alexeievich Galitzine (1728–1803), Russian ambassador to the Netherlands, was an intimate friend of Voltaire and a follower of Diderot; so, too, for many years was his mother, Countess Adelheid Amalie Gallitzin (1748-1806), until a severe illness in 1786 led her back to the Catholic Church, in which she had been raised.

At the age of 17, Demetrius was received into the Catholic Church. He then served as an aide-de-camp to the commander of the Austrian troops in Brabant; but, following the assassination of the king of Sweden, he, like all other foreigners, was dismissed from the service.

Gallitzin left Europe for the United States in 1792 where he landed in Baltimore. It was soon after his arrival that he decided to enter the priesthood. He was ordained in March 1795 and was one of the first Catholic priests ordained in America. After several years serving as a missionary in southern Pennsylvania and Maryland, Father Gallitzin founded the settlement of Loretto, Pennsylvania, in what is now Cambria County, Pennsylvania in 1799. Loretto was an expansion of a smaller settlement established by Michael McGuire in 1788. When McGuire died in 1793, he donated "McGuire's Settlement" to the Catholic Church in America for the establishment of a Catholic community.

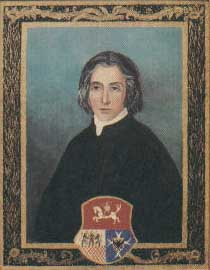
Demetrius Augustine Gallitzin - founder of Loretto, Pennsylvania, and namesake of Prince Gallitzin State Park

With Gallitzin's leadership, Loretto became the first English-speaking Catholic settlement in the United States west of the Allegheny Front. In addition to McGuire's patrimony, Gallitzin is believed to have spent $150,000 (USD) of his own funds later, to purchase some additional 20,000 acres (8,100 ha), which it is said he gave or sold at low prices to newly arriving Catholic settlers. Father Gallitzin worked to build Loretto by establishing a gristmill, tannery, and sawmill in the town. He also was instrumental in the education of the children of the area and served as a doctor, banker and lawyer for many of the citizens of Loretto.

Gallitzin died at Loretto on May 6, 1840, and was buried near St. Michael's church in Loretto. Father Gallitzin has been honored in the places names of several locations in Pennsylvania, including Gallitzin, Gallitzin Springs and Prince Gallitzin Spring. Locally he is sometimes referred to as "the priest who may have been a tzar". On June 6, 2005, it was announced that Gallitzin had been named a Servant of God by the Congregation for the Causes of Saints, the first step on the path toward possible future sainthood.

=== Establishment of the park ===
Establishing a park near Patton was first discussed during the Great Depression of the 1930s. The National Park Service discussed plans for opening a Recreation Demonstration Area just to the east of Patton on Beaverdam Run, a tributary of Clearfield Creek. The project was proposed and approved but was never put into place.

The subject of building a park came up again in 1955. The Patton Chamber of Commerce proposed building a dam in the Killbuck area. They met with Maurice K. Goddard who was at the time the secretary of the Pennsylvania Department of Forests and Waters, a forerunner to the Pennsylvania Department of Conservation and Natural Resources. The idea was approved and on April 4, 1957, Governor George M. Leader announced plans for the construction of the park. The park was funded by monies gained from oil and natural gas leases. Central to the park plans was the building of Glendale Dam and the formation of Glendale Lake. Groundbreaking at the park was held on May 3, 1958, and the lake began to fill on December 2, 1960. The park was finally dedicated on May 29, 1965, by Governor William Scranton.

== Climate ==
Climate data for Prince Gallitzin State Park, Pennsylvania (1991–2020 normals, extremes 1982–present)
Month	Jan	Feb	Mar	Apr	May	Jun	Jul	Aug	Sep	Oct	Nov	Dec	Year
Record high °F (°C)	68 (20)	78 (26)	83 (28)	92 (33)	92 (33)	94 (34)	101 (38)	97 (36)	93 (34)	86 (30)	81 (27)	71 (22)	101 (38)
Mean maximum °F (°C)	59.0 (15.0)	60.0 (15.6)	68.7 (20.4)	80.3 (26.8)	86.3 (30.2)	89.1 (31.7)	90.8 (32.7)	89.4 (31.9)	87.1 (30.6)	78.7 (25.9)	70.7 (21.5)	60.6 (15.9)	92.1 (33.4)
Mean daily maximum °F (°C)	34.0 (1.1)	37.0 (2.8)	46.1 (7.8)	60.1 (15.6)	70.2 (21.2)	77.9 (25.5)	82.1 (27.8)	80.5 (26.9)	73.5 (23.1)	61.6 (16.4)	49.1 (9.5)	38.4 (3.6)	59.2 (15.1)
Daily mean °F (°C)	24.9 (−3.9)	27.0 (−2.8)	35.2 (1.8)	47.1 (8.4)	57.4 (14.1)	65.8 (18.8)	69.8 (21.0)	68.4 (20.2)	61.2 (16.2)	49.7 (9.8)	39.2 (4.0)	30.1 (−1.1)	48.0 (8.9)
Mean daily minimum °F (°C)	15.9 (−8.9)	17.1 (−8.3)	24.3 (−4.3)	34.0 (1.1)	44.6 (7.0)	53.6 (12.0)	57.5 (14.2)	56.3 (13.5)	49.0 (9.4)	37.7 (3.2)	29.3 (−1.5)	21.8 (−5.7)	36.8 (2.7)
Mean minimum °F (°C)	−6.4 (−21.3)	−1.8 (−18.8)	4.0 (−15.6)	19.1 (−7.2)	29.5 (−1.4)	38.4 (3.6)	45.5 (7.5)	44.2 (6.8)	35.2 (1.8)	24.6 (−4.1)	13.7 (−10.2)	4.7 (−15.2)	−8.7 (−22.6)
Record low °F (°C)	−28 (−33)	−22 (−30)	−12 (−24)	10 (−12)	23 (−5)	28 (−2)	33 (1)	31 (−1)	28 (−2)	9 (−13)	6 (−14)	−19 (−28)	−28 (−33)
Average precipitation inches (mm)	2.82 (72)	2.46 (62)	3.27 (83)	3.66 (93)	3.73 (95)	3.86 (98)	3.91 (99)	3.92 (100)	4.05 (103)	3.15 (80)	2.90 (74)	2.93 (74)	40.66 (1,033)
Average snowfall inches (cm)	15.4 (39)	14.6 (37)	7.6 (19)	1.6 (4.1)	0.0 (0.0)	0.0 (0.0)	0.0 (0.0)	0.0 (0.0)	0.0 (0.0)	0.4 (1.0)	1.8 (4.6)	8.5 (22)	49.9 (127)
Average extreme snow depth inches (cm)	9.0 (23)	9.3 (24)	6.1 (15)	1.0 (2.5)	0.0 (0.0)	0.0 (0.0)	0.0 (0.0)	0.0 (0.0)	0.0 (0.0)	0.2 (0.51)	2.1 (5.3)	4.6 (12)	14.5 (37)
Average precipitation days (≥ 0.01 in)	15.9	12.5	12.4	13.9	15.0	13.0	12.2	11.6	11.9	12.4	11.5	14.0	156.3
Average snowy days (≥ 0.1 in)	8.4	7.1	4.2	1.1	0.0	0.0	0.0	0.0	0.0	0.2	1.6	5.1	27.7
Source: NOAA

== Recreation ==
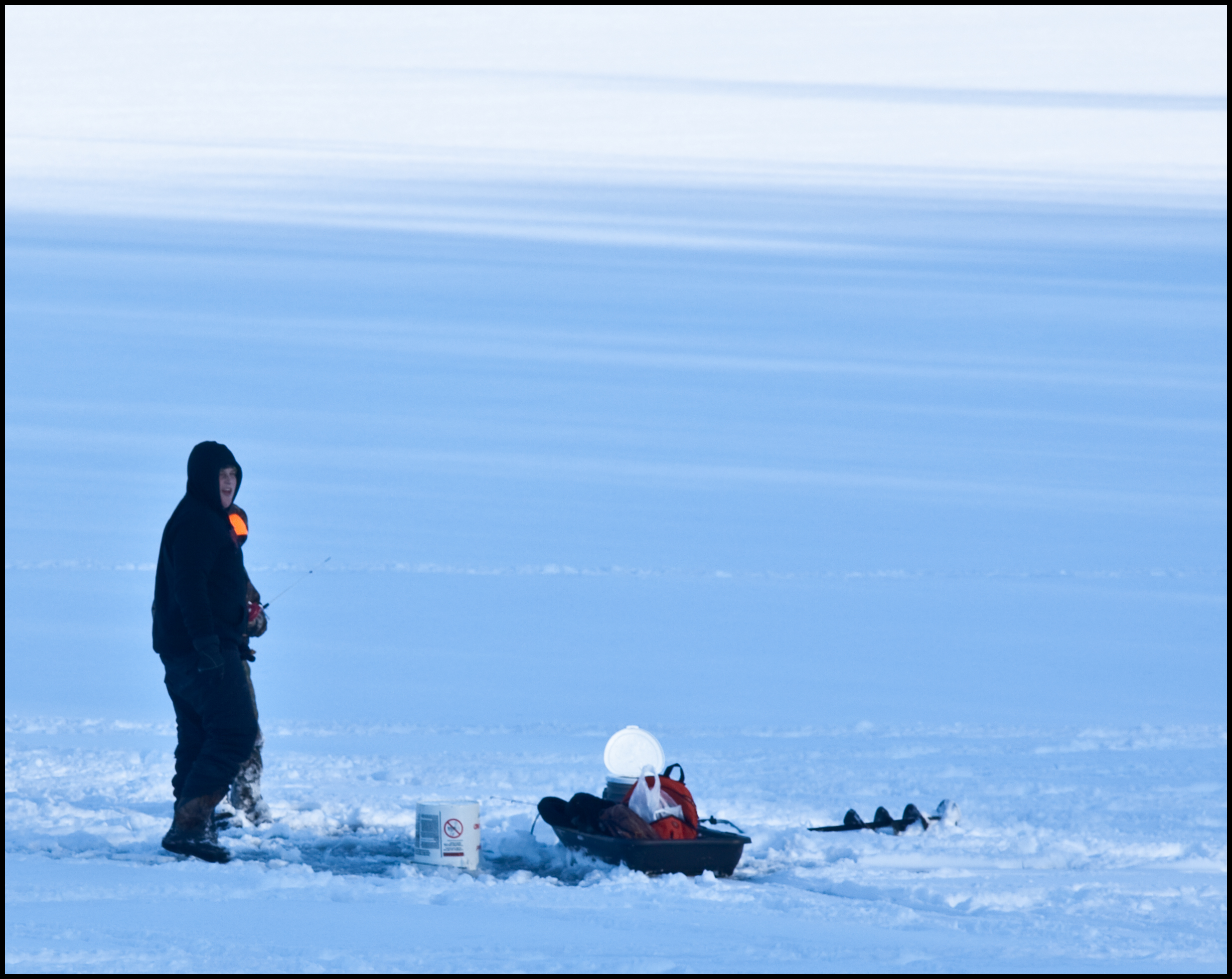
Ice fishing on Glendale Lake at Prince Gallitzin State Park

Prince Gallitzin is the home to several different types of outdoor recreation. Glendale Lake is open to swimming, fishing and boating. There are 12 miles (19.31supkm) of trails open for hiking and in some locations equestrian, mountain biking, and snowmobiling. There are over 1,000 picnic tables at the park. Visitors interested in staying over night can use one of 437 campsites or rent one of the 10 cabins at Prince Gallitzin State Park.

=== Glendale Lake ===
Glendale Lake is a major boating destination along the Allegheny Front. Boats up to 20 horsepower are permitted on the lake. Nine boat launches and two marinas are at Glendale Lake. Services provided at the marinas include boat rental, boat repair, and fuel sales. All boats must have a current registration from any state or a launch permit from the Pennsylvania Fish and Boat Commission. Glendale Lake is a warm-water fishery. The common game fish are pike, muskellunge, bass, perch, crappie, and bluegill. Bow fishing is permitted at Prince Gallitzin State Park. The beach at Glendale Lake is open from late May until mid-September. Lifeguards are not posted, so swimming is at one's own risk.

=== Hunting ===
Hunting is permitted at Prince Gallitzin State Park. Hunters are expected to follow the rules and regulations of the Pennsylvania Game Commission. The common game species are squirrels, turkey, white-tailed deer, ruffed grouse, and rabbits. The hunting of groundhogs is prohibited.

=== Trails ===
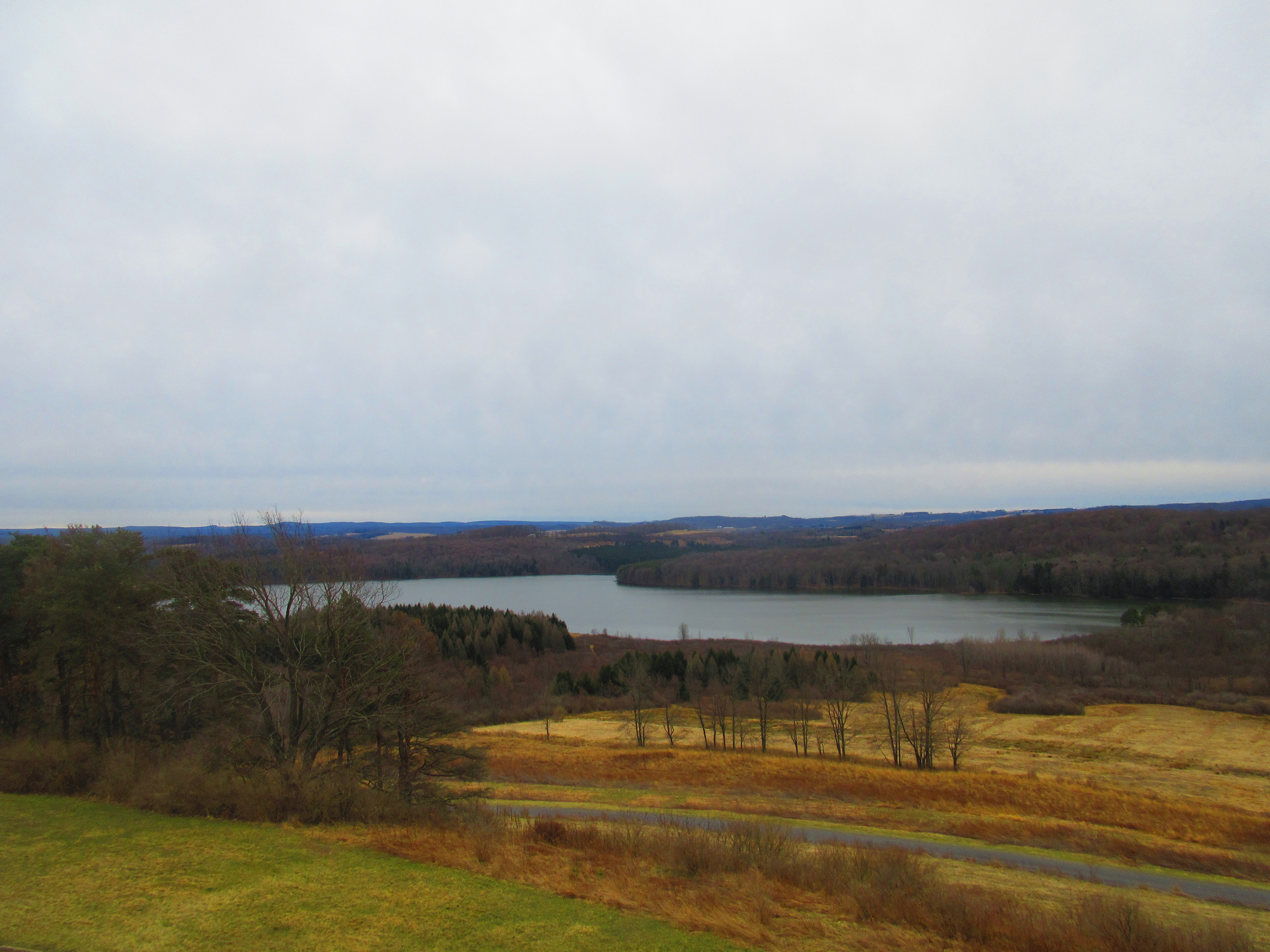
View of a portion of the lake and surrounding woodlands from the observation deck on top of a water tower.

The trailhead for most of the hiking trails is located near the campground along Crooked Run.

- Crooked Run Trail - is an easy 1.5-mile (2.4 km) hiking trail. It passes along Crooked Run through a hemlock and hardwood forest. The trail is a loop near where Crooked Run enters Glendale Lake. The parts of the trail nearest the lake pass through a marsh. The trail is therefore wet in places and there are some exposed roots.
- Turkey Ridge Trail - is an easy to moderate 1.2-mile (1.9 km) hiking trail. The trail offers the chance to see a variety of bird and animal species as it passes through several different habitats.
- Exercise Trail - is an easy 1-mile (1.6 km) hiking trail. The mowed grass trail has 20 exercise stations spread along the course of the path as it passes through an open field.
- Peninsula Area Trail - is an easy to moderate trail that varies in length depending on where one enters the trail. The peninsula is covered with mature second growth oak forest. There is little undergrowth in the forest. This makes Glendale Lake visible from most locations on the peninsula.
- Deer Trail - is an easy 0.7-mile (1.1 km) hiking trail. Deer Trail passes by a food plot kept by the Pennsylvania Game Commission near State Game Land 108. Deer Trail provides access to hunters and hikers to the game land.
- Footprint Trail - is an easy to moderate 0.8-mile (1.3 km) hiking trail. The trail climbs a small hill overlooking Glendale Lake. Several benches are located on the trail for resting and birdwatching.
- Forest Trail - is an easy 0.4-mile (640 m) hiking trail. Visitors will most likely be encountered by chattering red squirrels as they hike through their habitat of beech, hemlock, and maple trees.
- Lakeshore Trail - is an easy 1.75-mile (2.82 km) hiking trail in a forest along the shores of Glendale Lake.
- Poems Trail - is an easy 0.6-mile (970 m) hiking trail. There are many poems on trailmakers spread along the course of the trail. Each poem is about a different aspect of nature inspired by the natural surroundings of Prince Gallitzin State Park.
- Point Trail - is a moderate 2.3-mile (3.7 km) hiking trail. There are many exposed roots and several windblown trees along the trail. The trail follows the shore of Glendale Lake before climbing a small hill.

=== Horseback Riding ===
The park is a popular horseback riding destination with about 22 miles of pleasant and easy trails. Horse trails are in the north, east, and southeast of the park and are most easily accessed from Beaver Valley Marina upper parking lot.
