= Wizard Clip =

Ghost story about Middleway, West Virginia

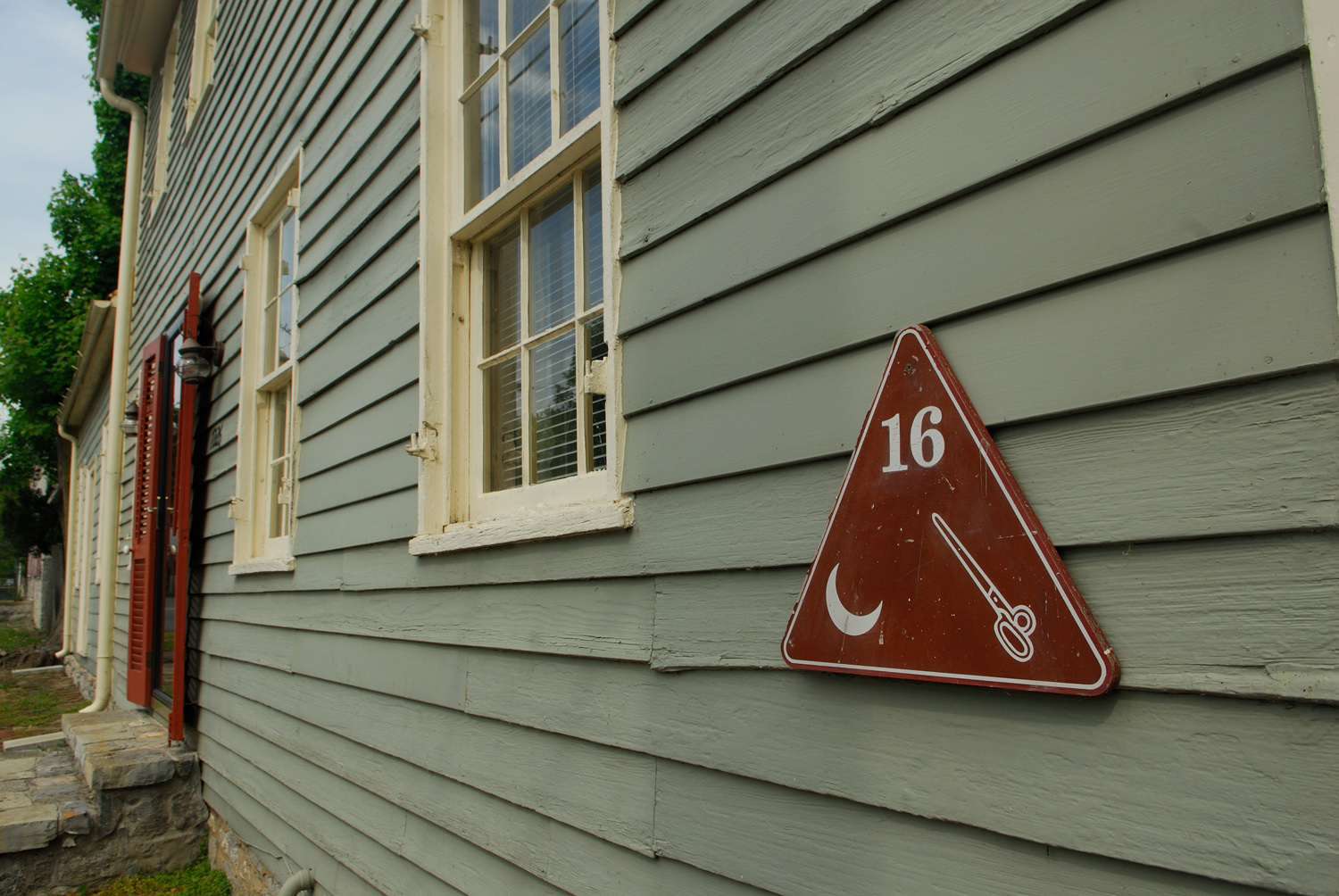
A historical plaque in Middleway, West Virginia with scissors and a half moon: symbols related to the legend of the Wizard Clip

The legend of the Wizard Clip is a popular ghost story about an incident said to have occurred in Middleway, West Virginia in the 1790s. The story of the Wizard Clip is part of the oral history of the area and was called by Rev. Alfred E. Smith, editor-in-chief of the Catholic Review and secretary to Cardinal Gibbons, "The truest ghost story ever told."

== Legend ==
=== The Clip ===
According to the story, around 1794, a traveling stranger boarded at the house of a former Pennsylvanian named Adam Livingston, where he took ill, and asked Livingston to bring a Catholic priest. The area was mostly devoid of Catholics and no priest could be found, and the Lutheran Livingston was not enthusiastic about finding one. Ultimately, the stranger died of his illness and was buried nearby without the benefit of a Catholic service.

After the stranger died, it is said that candles would not stay lit in the room where his corpse was, sounds of horses galloping and crockery breaking were heard, and burning embers jumped from the fireplace hearth. Sounds of heavy shears making clipping noises were heard in various parts of the house, and all sorts of materials — fabric, sheets, and boots — were clipped with half-moon shapes and other figures. According to the legend, the manifestations continued over a period of years, causing great distress to the Livingston family. One often repeated tale is of a visitor who wrapped her new silk cap in a handkerchief to keep it safe while in the Livingston house, but upon her departure she found the handkerchief untouched while the cap had been cut to ribbons.

Legend holds that after Livingston implored Father Dennis Cahill, an immigrant Irish priest in Shepherdstown, to visit his house to investigate, Father Cahill sprinkled holy water about the property, some of the manifestations changed, and a sum of money that had previously gone missing was deposited on the threshold of the house. Later, Father Cahill returned with Father Demetrius Gallitzin, who had heard of the tale of the "Clip" at his home in Conewago and said a Mass at the house, after which the haunting ceased. Gallitzin later wrote a long report to his bishop, John Carroll, about the events, but the document was lost; although he does mention it in other of his writings such as Gallitzin's Letters in a chapter titled "A Letter to a Protestant Friend."

=== The Voice ===
The legend continues to narrate how, after the cessation of the "Wizard Clip," supernatural phenomena did not stop on the Livingston property. Soon after Father Gallitzin's visit, the family began to hear a "consoling Voice," a mysterious presence that is said to have remained with them for seventeen years. This Voice first manifested itself as a bright light that awoke Mr. Livingston from sleep. A clear, sweet voice then told him to arise, call his family together, and to pray. He did so, and the mysterious Voice prayed with them, guiding and leading their prayers. The same Voice then continued to instruct them in the Catholic faith, "in the most simple yet eloquent manner." This supernatural visitation, considered by the Livingston family to be the voice of a soul in purgatory, led to their conversion to the Catholic faith.

== Gift of land ==
In 1802, Livingston deeded 35 acres (14 ha) of his land along the Opequon Creek to the Catholic Church as "a field to sustain a priest". According to legend, the land was given in gratitude for exorcising the alleged demonic infestation. This parcel has since been known as "The Priest's Field." In 1983, the Diocese of Wheeling–Charleston dedicated the Priest Field Pastoral Center on the site.

== See also ==
- List of ghosts
- Middleway, West Virginia
- Demetrius Augustine Gallitzin
