= White Township, Cambria County, Pennsylvania =

Township in Pennsylvania, US

- Township
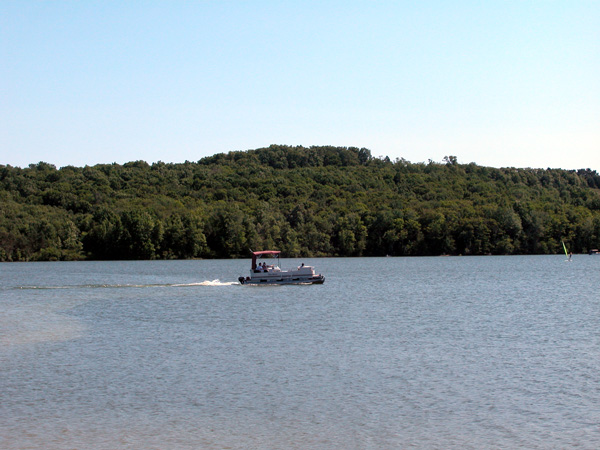
- Boat on Glendale Lake at Prince Gallitzin State Park

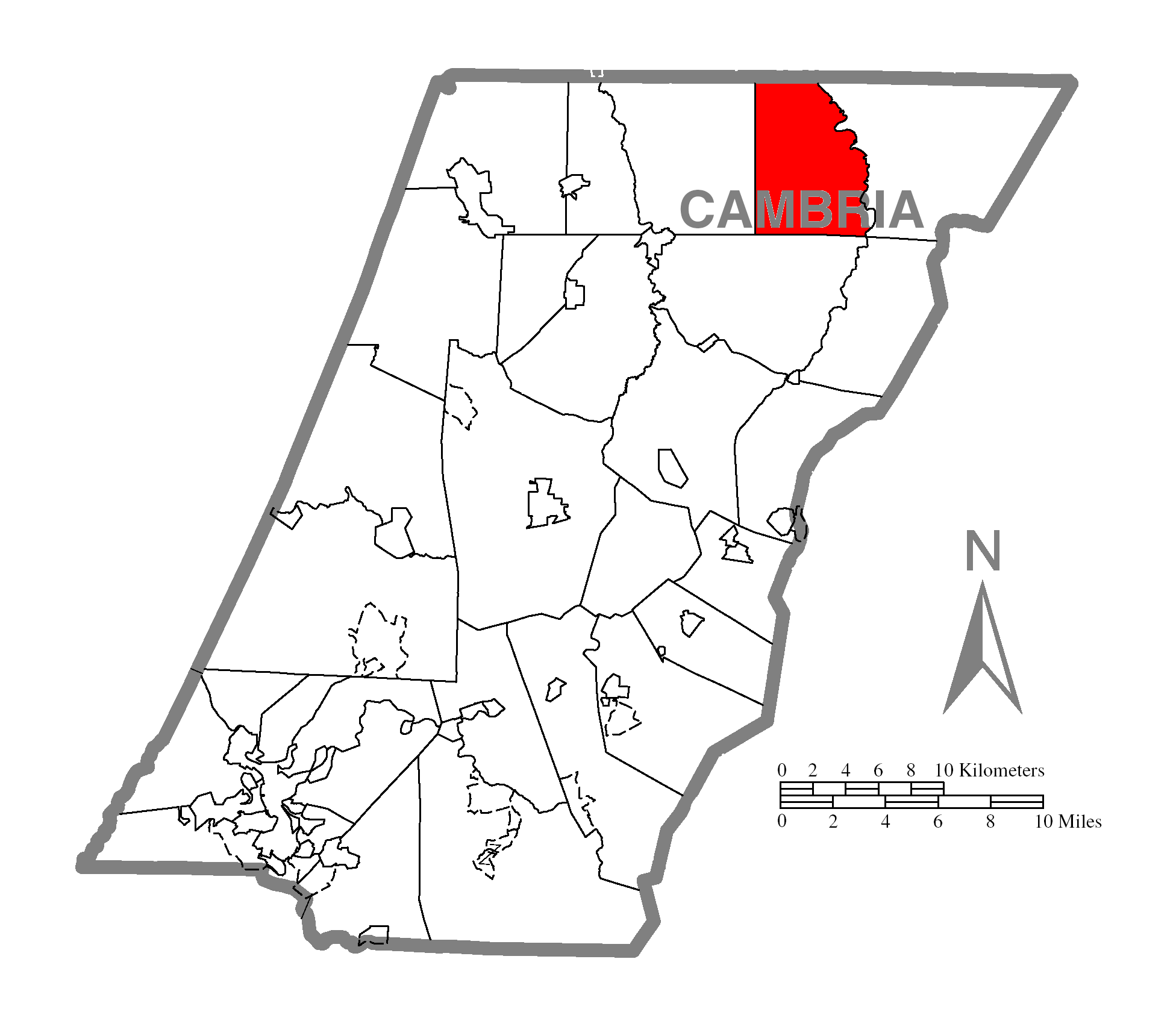
- Map of Cambria County, Pennsylvania highlighting White Township

- Map of Cambria County, Pennsylvania
- Country: United States
- State: Pennsylvania
- County: Cambria
- Incorporated: 1838

Area
  - Total: 22.74 sq mi (58.90 km^{2})
  - Land: 20.29 sq mi (52.55 km^{2})
  - Water: 2.46 sq mi (6.36 km^{2})

Population (2010)
  - Total: 836
  - Estimate (2016): 796
  - Density: 39.2/sq mi (15.15/km^{2})
- Time zone: UTC-5 (Eastern (EST))
  - Summer (DST): UTC-4 (EDT)
- Area code: 814
- FIPS code: 42-021-84448
- Website: twp.white.pa.us

White Township is a township that is located in Cambria County, Pennsylvania, United States. The population was 836 at the time of the 2010 census.

It is part of the Johnstown, Pennsylvania Metropolitan Statistical Area.

== Geography ==
White Township is located in northern Cambria County approximately at 40.67°N by 78.53°W, 22 miles (35 km) northeast of Ebensburg, the county seat, and about 20 miles (32 km) northwest of Altoona. The township is bordered by Clearfield County to the north. The township's eastern border follows Clearfield Creek, a north-flowing tributary of the West Branch Susquehanna River.

The primary feature in the township is Prince Gallitzin State Park, which occupies most of the central and southern parts of the township. The park surrounds Glendale Lake, a reservoir on Beaverdam Run, which flows north into Clearfield Creek.

According to the United States Census Bureau, the township has a total area of 22.7 square miles (58.9 km^{2}), of which 20.3 square miles (52.5 km^{2}) is land and 2.5 square miles (6.4 km^{2}), or 10.79%, is water.

== Communities ==
=== Unincorporated communities ===
- Beaver Valley
- Fiske
- Glendale

== Demographics ==
Historical population
Census	Pop.	Note	%±
2000	813		—
2010	836		2.8%
2016 (est.)	796		−4.8%
U.S. Decennial Census

As of the census of 2000, there were 813 people, 311 households, and 226 families residing in the township. The population density was 40.3 inhabitants per square mile (15.6/km^{2}). There were 490 housing units at an average density of 24.3/sq mi (9.4/km^{2}). The racial makeup of the township was 96.56% White, 0.74% African American, 1.97% Asian, 0.49% from other races, and 0.25% from two or more races. Hispanic or Latino of any race were 0.74% of the population.

There were 311 households, out of which 26.7% had children under the age of eighteen living with them, 61.4% were married couples living together, 6.1% had a female householder with no husband present, and 27.3% were non-families. 22.5% of all households were made up of individuals, and 7.7% had someone living alone who was sixty-five years of age or older.

The average household size was 2.47 and the average family size was 2.87.

Within the township, the population was spread out, with 20.3% of residents who were under the age of eighteen, 6.8% who were aged eighteen to twenty-four, 28.7% who were aged twenty-five to forty-four, 27.7% who were aged forty-five to sixty-four, and 16.6% who were sixty-five years of age or older. The median age was forty-one years.

For every one hundred females, there were 117.4 males. For every one hundred females who were aged eighteen or older, there were 109.0 males.

The median income for a household in the township was $31,458, and the median income for a family was $33,846. Males had a median income of $30,833 compared with that of $18,359 for females.

The per capita income for the township was $14,007.

Approximately 6.9% of families and 13.3% of the population were living below the poverty line, including 9.6% of those ho were under the age of eighteen and 7.8% of those who were aged sixty-five or older.

== Recreation ==
Most of Prince Gallitzin State Park occupies the western end of the township. Portions of the Pennsylvania State Game Lands Number 108 are located in the township.
