= Middleway, West Virginia =

- Census-designated place
- Location within West Virginia Location within the United States
- Coordinates: 39°18′12″N 77°58′51″W
- Country: United States
- State: West Virginia
- County: Jefferson

Area
  - Total: 1.123 sq mi (2.91 km^{2})
  - Land: 1.123 sq mi (2.91 km^{2})
  - Water: 0 sq mi (0 km^{2})
- Elevation: 509 ft (155 m)

Population (2010)
  - Total: 441
  - Density: 393/sq mi (152/km^{2})
- Time zone: UTC-5 (Eastern (EST))
  - Summer (DST): UTC-4 (EDT)
- GNIS feature ID: 2586853

Middleway is a census-designated place (CDP) in Jefferson County, West Virginia, United States, in the lower Shenandoah Valley. As of the 2020 census, its population was 482.

== History ==
On January 15, 1786, the Virginia General Assembly passed an act establishing the town of Smithfield on land owned by John Smith II and William Smith. A post office was established in 1806; and since there was another town called Smithfield in the state, a different name was needed to avoid confusion. Because Smithfield had become a center of commerce between several other towns, the post office became known as "Middleway." Middleway remains a small village and retains many of its historic buildings. The Middleway Historic District was added to the National Register of Historic Places in 1980.

The area where the town grew was first visited by John Smith I and his sons John Smith II and Rees Smith in 1729. By 1734, they had established a grist mill and a hemp mill. In the 1790s, in an effort to increase the town, the Smithfield Promotion was undertaken. This did increase the size of the town, but it stagnated from then on.

The town has also been known as "Wizard Clip" or "Clip", and townspeople as "Clippers". This is the result of a legend from the 1790s, in which a traveler lodged with Adam Livingston and his family. During the night, the traveler died, calling for a priest, though Livingston refused to let a Catholic priest enter his home. After the stranger's burial, Livingston saw various disturbing supernatural phenomena: heads and legs falling off chickens, all the crockery spontaneously falling to the floor, etc. The most common experience was a constant clipping sound, like that of scissors, which pervaded the house, giving the legend its name. Anyone entering the house had their clothes cut into tatters or half-moon crescents. Livingston dreamed of a priest and found in Shepherdstown Father Dennis Cahill, a Catholic priest who appeared in his dream. This priest exorcised the spirit and the family converted to Catholicism. Afterwards they would frequently hear a disembodied voice who provided advice, told them to pray, and told them to be better Catholics.

== Gallery ==
Middleway Historic District

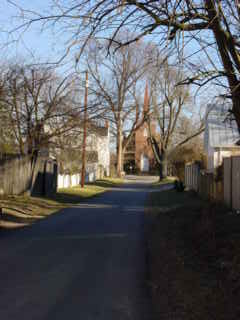
Grace Street

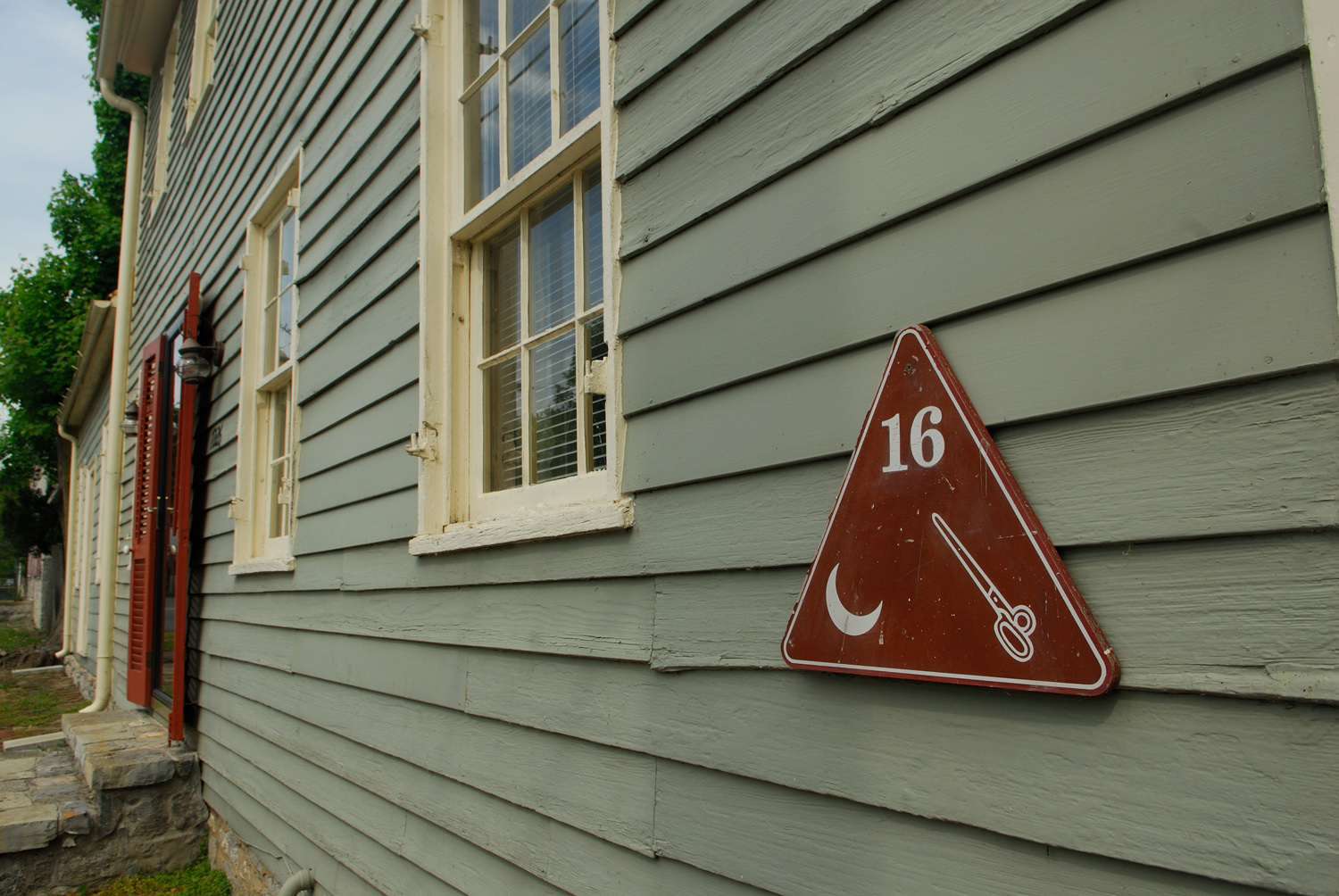
Half-moon crescent symbol

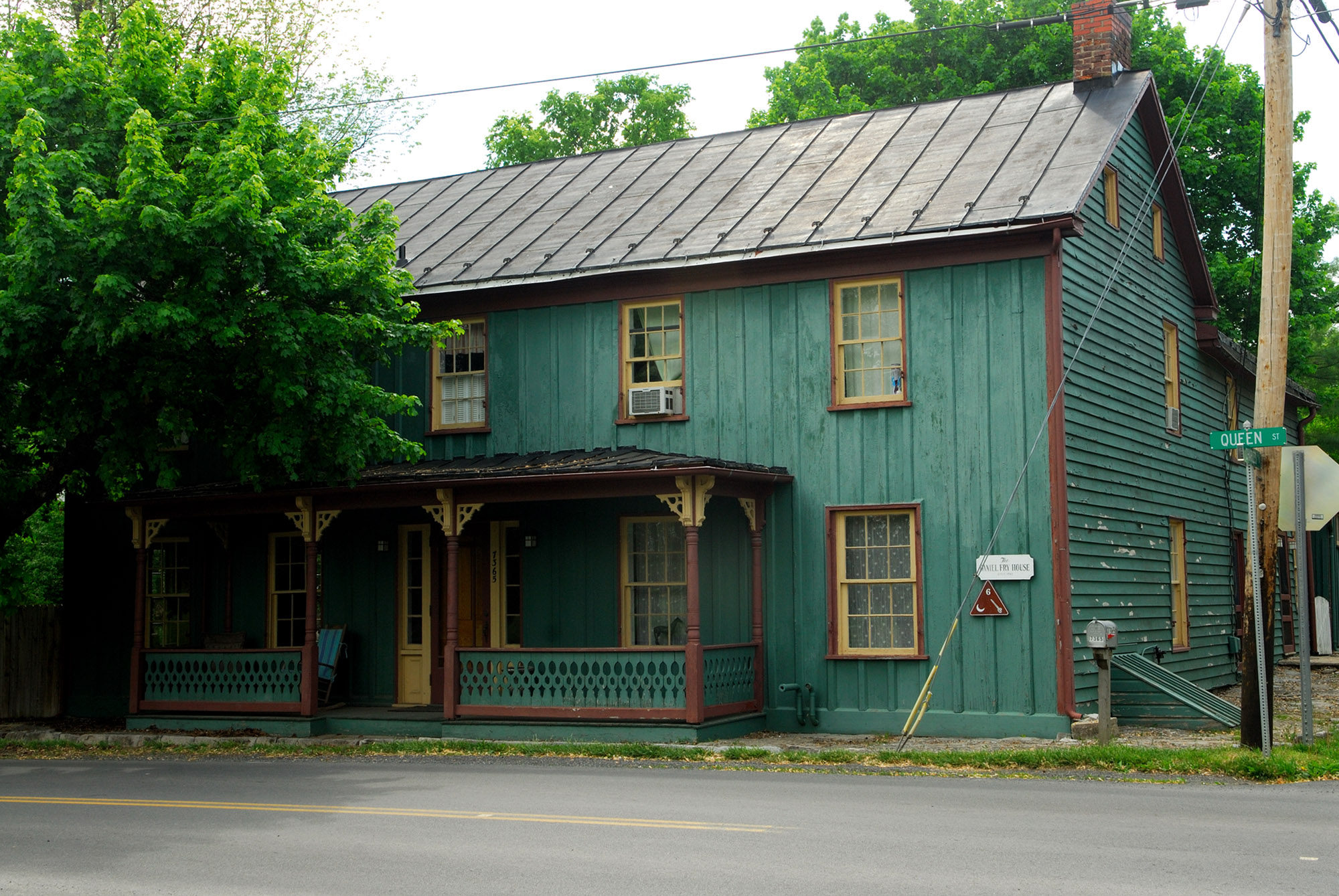
The Daniel Fry House on Queen Street

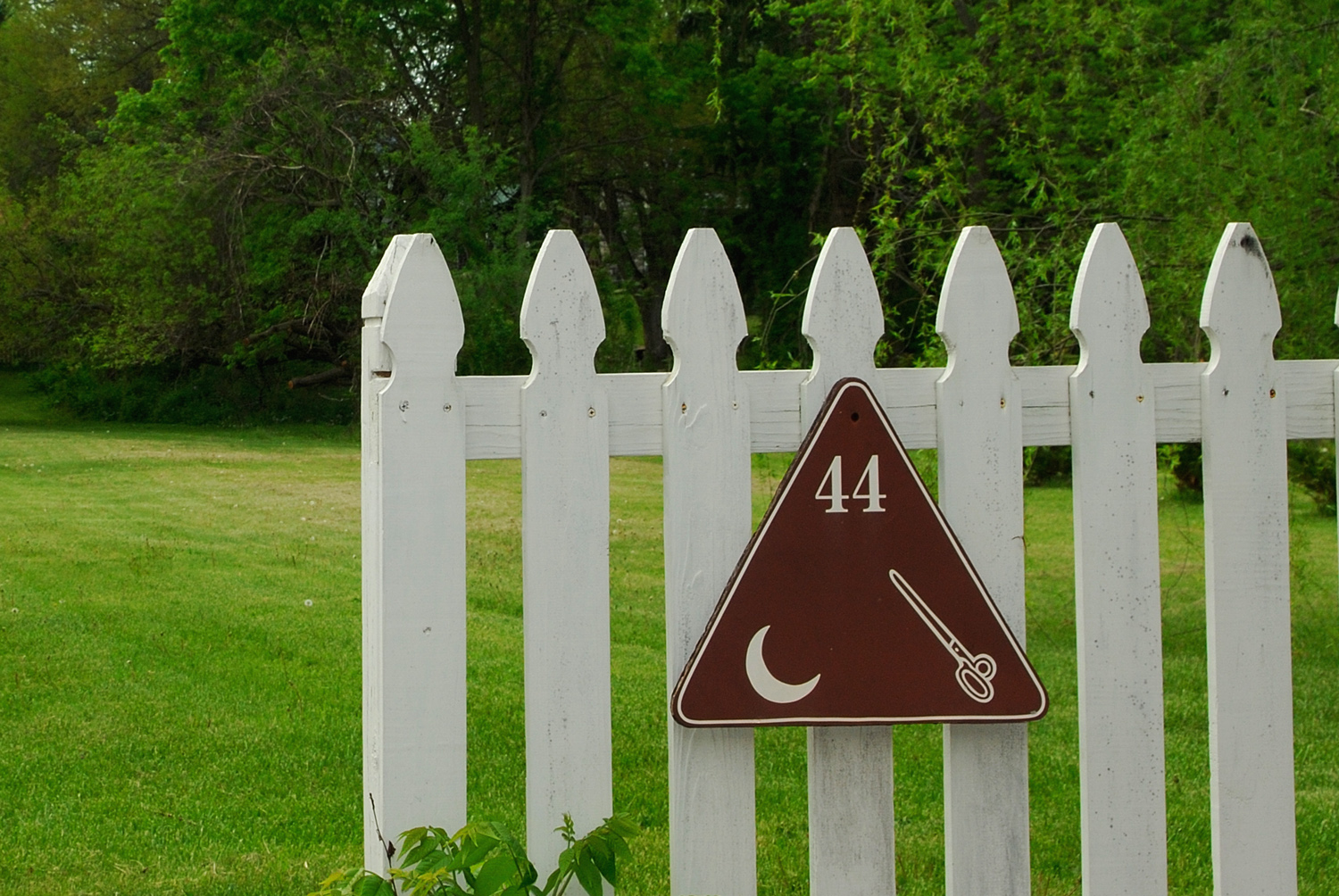
Half-moon crescent symbol
